= Indian rock =

Rock music subgenre that takes influences from Indian music

- Stylistic origins: Rock; Indian music; jazz
- Cultural origins: India, Bengal
- Typical instruments: Vocals; gramophone; indian musical instruments; electric guitar; bass guitar; drums; keyboard; electric sitar

Indian rock is a music genre in India that may incorporate elements of Indian music with rock music, and is often topically India-centric. While India is more often known for its (northern and southern) classical music, filmi, Bollywood music, Indi-pop, and Bhangra, the Indian rock scene has also produced numerous bands and artists.

== Early history ==
India, in the 1950s and 1960s, had a record industry in the Gramophone Company of India (an EMI subsidiary), and LPs, EPs, and 45rpm records were freely available, including those of rock and roll acts from the US and Britain, but also of contemporary pioneering Indian rock bands. The president of the firm, Bhaskar Menon (who later became the President of Capitol Records in the United States) was the leading promoter of Western pop music in India. Later in 1970, Polydor, the German Label, began an India-based branch that distributed rock music locally.

Of these mid-1960s to early 70s beat groups, as they were then termed, some of the most notable were the Mystiks from Bombay, the Beat-X from Madras, and The Cavaliers, Calcutta-16, and The Flintstones from Calcutta, who composed and played both early British Invasion influenced songs, and post-Sgt. Pepper hard rock. During this period from Delhi there were The Thunderbirds (featuring singer Ashwani Bali, Bass Guitarist Percy Singh), and WAFWOT (also with Ashwani on vocals, with organist Mark Spevak, from the U.S. and Bass Guitarist Percy Singh) These bands played regularly on the Indian university and college music circuits, and some had successful EP and LP releases. Also notable from this period (1964–1970) was the female R&B singer, Usha Iyer, now Usha Uthup, who had successful covers of "Jambalaya" and The Kingston Trio song, "Greenback Dollar". A notable compilation LP titled "Simla Beat '70" was released during this period, from a contest of the same name. The winning bands recorded their versions of Western hard rock of the time. This tradition of covering Western rock would continue until the 1980s when it was more common to compose original songs.

The rock n' roll scene was also closely followed by Junior Statesman (or JS), a magazine started in 1965 contemporaneously with Rolling Stone magazine in the US and NME in the UK.

Like Western rock bands at the time, Indian bands also began fusing rock with traditional Indian music from the mid-1960s onwards. A notable example of this is in the Cavaliers' 1967 hit "Love is A Mango," which incorporates sitar accompaniment alongside Beatlesque songwriting. However, filmi songs, those produced specifically for popular Bollywood films, often overshadowed the country's budding rock scene, which otherwise contrasted from that within the film industry. Some of the more well known filmi songs (including styles such as funk rock, pop rock, psychedelic rock, raga rock, and soft rock) from Bollywood films include Mohammed Rafi's "Jaan Pehechan Ho" in Gumnaam (1965), Kishore Kumar's "O Saathi Re" in Muqaddar Ka Sikandar (1978), and Asha Bhosle songs such as "Dum Maro Dum" in Hare Rama Hare Krishna (1971), "Ae Naujawan Hai Sab" in Apradh (1972), and "Yeh Mera Dil Pyar Ka Diwana" in Don (1978).

=== Indian influence on Western music ===
In the 1960s, renowned Western acts such as The Yardbirds, The Beatles, The Rolling Stones, The Doors and The Byrds were notably influenced by Indian classical music as a way of reinforcing the psychedelia in their music. While jazz musicians, notably John Coltrane, had ventured into Indian music and spiritualism (see Indo jazz, Sitar in jazz, and Jazz in India), the influence of Indian classical music on 1960s rock began in earnest with George Harrison's Ravi Shankar inspired raga rock song "Norwegian Wood (This Bird Has Flown)" in 1965 and The Beatles' very public sojourn with the Maharishi Mahesh Yogi at his ashram in Rishikesh in 1968, following the release of Sgt. Pepper's Lonely Hearts Club Band in 1967. Raga rock led to the development of psychedelic rock, which in turn laid the foundations for heavy metal music.

The Indian rock scene would later give rise to one of the world's most famous rock stars, Freddie Mercury, born Farrokh Bulsara. One of his formative musical influences was the Bollywood singer Lata Mangeshkar. He began his music career as a teenager in Bombay with the rock band, The Hectics, which was founded in 1958 and often performed cover versions of Western rock and roll artists such as Little Richard and Cliff Richard. After leaving the band in 1962, he moved to England, where he later led the rock band Queen (formed in 1971), which went on to become one of the world's most famous rock bands.

The Indian rock scene also gave rise to one of the pioneers of disco music, Biddu, who originally began his career in an Indian rock band called The Trojans. It was India's first English-speaking band, and found success producing cover versions of The Beatles, The Rolling Stones, Trini Lopez, and other Western hits of the day, in the clubs of Bangalore, Calcutta, and Bombay. After the band broke up, he moved in 1967 to England, where he later found breakthrough success after producing "Kung Fu Fighting" for Carl Douglas.

== 1980s and 1990s ==
While the orientalist trend of the 60s and 70s was by the 80s and 90s largely over, India itself continued to produce bands in various styles of rock music, from soft rock and roll and pop rock, to hard rock and metal. In the early 1980s, however, rock was largely overshadowed by disco, which dominated Indian pop music up until the mid-1980s.

With the arrival of MTV, tastes rapidly changed, encouraging bands to harden their style and focus more on underground styles such as death metal, alternative metal, and progressive rock. The 1990s saw the rise of a much larger following of various harder styles for this reason. Bands that had formed in the 80s, such as Rock Machine (who would later be known as Indus Creed) – (including Mahesh Tinnaikar, Uday Benegal, etc.)...altered their style with the influx of newer techniques and influences from the west. Notable suburban metal-blues bands with 1960s and 1970s metal influences included IIT Powaii based Axecalibre, fronted by Oliver Pinto, Prashant Nair and covered flamboyant guitar-based blues and hardcore metal including ballads. Contemporaries of the time were Easy Meat from Pune and Bands such as Holocaust, Morgue (fronted by vocalist Mrinal Das, Drummer Neeraj Kakoty, Ambar Das and Raju Seal on Twin Attack Guitars, Manas Chowdhury on Bass), Dorian Platonic from Guwahati, Assam, Grassroots Revival, Postmark, The Cannibals, Phoenix, Phynyx and Drixian Empire/Dark Crusader from Manipur.

Others formed in the 1990s with harder styles influenced by the growing split between popular rock, such as Britpop, alternative styles, such as punk, and metal styles, such as thrash. The Indian subgenre of fusion, which encourages a similar blend of ancient Indian musical traditions with rock music to raga rock, was also carried forward, and is perhaps the most unusual Indian style of rock. It was during this time that Palash Sen's Euphoria surfaced in the Indian scene as a straight ahead English rock band. The band later started writing in Hindi, and gave birth to what is now known as "Hindi Rock". Euphoria went on to become India's most popular, successful and commercially accepted Independent act. Other fusion bands like Indian Ocean and Mrigya also grew in popularity. As in decades before, university campuses and campus rock shows continued to be the driving force behind determining what kind of band would succeed and what kind of music young people liked.

== 2000s ==
The current Indian rock scene has a larger following than ever (although it is still marginalized compared to Indian film music, particularly the filmi soundtracks of Bollywood) and may soon become recognized in the international arena, as various South American and Japanese bands have become. Recent entries into the rock music scene are increasingly becoming comparable in their production quality to Western bands, and have been compared favorably to other internationally recognized acts. Now digital technology is making it easier than ever for these bands to distribute and sell their music. Some British bands of South Asian origin, such as Swami have, like their hip-hop counterparts, tried to enter the Indian market in addition to maintaining the traditional fanbase of non-resident Indians in United Kingdom, Canada and the United States. Others, such as Rudra, have emerged from Indian communities in other Asian countries. Progress is certain for the Indian rock scene with the advent of entities that support this genre. Rock Street Journal and Rolling Stone India are the two major publications that have been promoting Indian rock bands. The scene has also been transformed by the online medium, and the subsequent rise of a number of online portals promoting Indian rock, most notably the indie music website NH7, Headbangers India, IndianMusicMug, Unholy Maunder, IndianMusicRevolution, Metalbase India, Indian Metal Scene, and Metal Spree.

== Sub-genres ==
=== Raga rock ===
In the West, some groups, such as The Beatles, traveled to India and incorporated aspects of Indian music, especially classical instruments such as the sitar, into their music, often as a way of conjuring psychedelic 'Eastern' feelings. The term for this was raga rock, and examples of it are The Beatles "Love You To", "The Inner Light","Across the Universe","Norwegian Wood (This Bird Has Flown)", "Tomorrow Never Knows", "Strawberry Fields Forever" and "Within You Without You"; The Rolling Stones' "Paint it, Black"; The Kinks' "Fancy"; The Doors' "The End" and The Byrds' "Eight Miles High". A number of prolific Indian classical musicians such as Ravi Shankar aligned themselves with this trend, collaborating with Western artists. Indian bands themselves mainly covered early rock songs by pioneers of rock and roll in the United Kingdom and America, and only achieved recognition in popular culture by supporting film scores and Indian pop.

=== Indian fusion ===
An Indian subgenre of rock exists that focuses on blending traditional Indian styles of music with rock music. The term for non-Indian bands using Indian instrumentals and vocal in rock is raga rock. However, Indian fusion also encompasses attempts by Indian pop musicians and film composers to incorporate rock music into their work, starting in the 1970s with film scores like those of the Amitabh Bachchan classics. The Brown Indian Band features accomplished Indian classical musicians in concert with jazz virtuosos. More recently, the multi-cultural British band Botown have taken elements of Bollywood and fused them with soul and funk to great success. The New Delhi-based band 'Ojapali' is also doing many experiments with Electronica Fusion music and Folk music of the Assam Region.

The Kochi-based band Motherjane typifies bands producing this genre of music. Motherjane guitarist Baiju Dharmajan is a pioneer of introducing the guitar music style known as carnatic shredding. Bangalore based carnatic rock band Agam and fusion rock outfit Divine Raaga, Kaav, Veenar are other examples of mature songmakers in the country. Karnatriix is another band that has defined a new genre of fusion music labelled 'New-age World music'. Their ever-evolving sound today registers as ideally in sync with the 21st century's pan-cultural landscape. The name 'KARNATRIIX', which is a word play, meaning 'Aural Trickery', openly defines their music. Mellifluous melodies and sophisticated phrases deep-rooted in Blues music with an Indian Classical touch, combined with raw percussion and electronically produced subtle beats, voices and effects, form the core essence of the Karnatriix's musical nature. Indian Guitarist Kapil Srivastava composed Rock and Raga Fusion music in his Indian Guitaroo Volume 1.

=== Indian funk ===
Indian funk is a loose term describing the style of rock and roll, which is sometimes blurred into the realms of pop and other genres. Whereas Indian fusion may only incorporate Indian styles into rock, or rock into Indian forms of music, Indian funk can be broadly defined as what rap-metal is to heavy metal – an infusion of elements from rap, reggae, pop and dance genres that some might consider not to be 'true' rock. Groups originating in South Asian communities in Western countries like Britain are noted for this style, with bands such as Swami and Asian Dub Foundation using elements of UK garage, UK bhangra and hip-hop, such as synthesizers, rap vocals and turntables. Also based in the UK, Botown takes an approach inspired by Funkadelic with a large lineup of live musicians to blend Bollywood music with soul and funk. Few rock bands such as Silent Echo (Delhi) and Psycho Frequency (Delhi) use a wide range of samples and mechanically evolved sounds.

=== Rock and roll ===
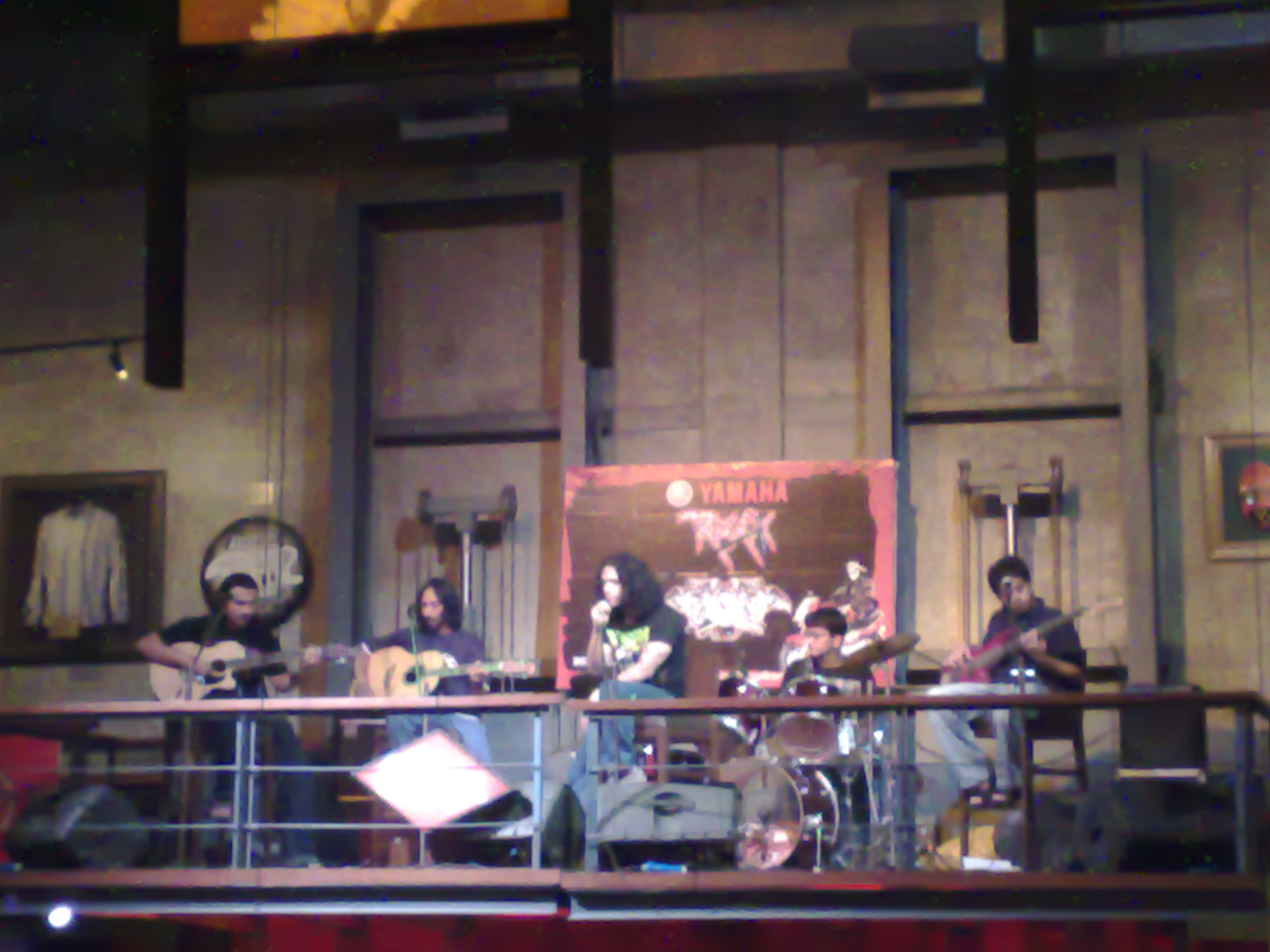
Hundred Octane performing at Hard Rock Cafe in Mumbai

India has produced many rock bands, some of whom have made it into mainstream Indian music and achieved some international recognition. RLC66 one of the upcoming acts from Mumbai trying to combine various genres from western music. Their main influences are Porcupine Tree, Tool, Dream Theater. The song "Abrupt" is earning some good number of fans in Mumbai underground scene. Indian Guitar Player Kapil Srivastava has composed Rock and Roll fusion in his Indian Guitaroo Volume 2.

In September 2015, Mumbai based Rock & Roll Bassist Vivek Date released his Rock & Roll Album "Wrapping Paper" The album received a warm response from the audience and a good critique from the reviewers with some tipping it as a gift to the Rock & Roll scene of 2015 in India

=== Hard rock and heavy metal ===
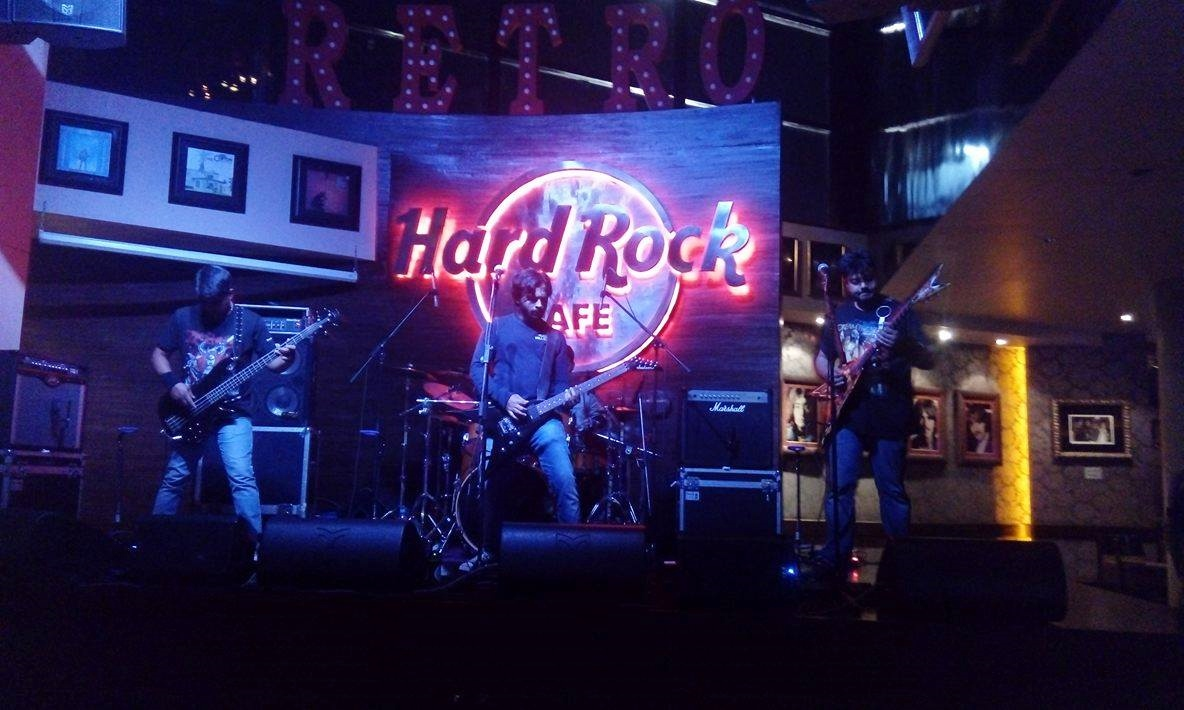
Nicotine playing at the Hard Rock Cafe, in Hyderabad, India in 2016. The band is widely known for being the pioneers of Metal Music in Central India.

=== Vedic Metal ===
A new brand of metal has arisen in India called "Vedic metal", or "Hindu metal", which traces its origins to the heavy metal band M.A.I.D.S (Metal Aliens in Devil's Soul), which laid the foundation of heavy metal and rock in southern India in the early 1990s. The Singaporean band Rudra initially got their worldwide push from major heavy metal label Sonic Wave International. With their style of 'Vedic metal' based around Hindu themes, the band have gained some fame in South East Asia, fusing heavy metal with Indian traditional music, in the vein of Brazil's Sepultura, although they do not use avant-garde instruments such as them. Many international critics from the United States, Germany, and other countries have given the band's albums rave reviews.

Since the genre was pioneered by Rudra in the late 1990s, it has grown in popularity. Bands like Wingz of Vayraag (India), Aryadeva (Ukraine), Symmetry (Indonesia), Warriors of Peace (India), Asura (India), Advaita (India), The Aryan March (India), Bhairav (India), Madhavas Rock Band (India), Narasimha (Singapore), Kaliyuga (Singapore), Azrael (Australia), Dying Out Flame (Nepal), Blue River (Sri Lanka), Punarjanma (India), and Kartikeya (Russia) have done pioneering work in the subgenre. Often, along with Vedic lyrics, the music has shades of Indian classical music. With the introduction of new subgenre of heavy metal, the Vedic-core bands like, Antim-Yuddha, Roktobeej are contributing to the rising Indian underground rock culture. The definitive album of this genre Rudra's The Aryan Crusade (2001). In addition, India has produced many heavy metal bands that combine ethnic-folk music with various forms of heavy metal to create other folk metal bands. Indian rock has been influenced by some notable cultural trends, and has in turn produced influences of its own. Indian musicians have also collaborated with other musicians from across the globe.

==== Heavy metal ====
Millennium was formed in 1988 as one of the first Indian metal bands, and it laid the foundation for the Indian heavy metal scene. Demonic Resurrection laid the foundation for Indian extreme metal early in 2000 when extreme metal in India was a scarce minority, since then it has garnered popularity especially in the underground scene and spawned many bands such as Corroded Dreams, Escher's Knot, Crypted, Bestial Murder, and some bands have adapted to black metal driven sound with a rawer sound and satanic lyrics. Bands such as Dark Desolation from Bengaluru and Fortified Destruction from Chennai have gone down that path. Many prolific extreme metal bands have spawned from the Chennai local scenes like Siva from Crypted, Abhijit Rao from Escher's Knot, Vyas "Hex" Manalan from Fortified Destruction who are all frontmen of their respective bands and all known for their extreme vocal capabilities and the addition of guitar in the case of Hex. With many extreme metal bands from other countries, such as Behemoth, Gojira, and Cradle of Filth are setting foot on the India. Some of the most popular heavy metal bands in India are Midhaven, Zygnema, Bhayanak Maut, Albatros, Noiseware, Abraxas, Devoid, Sceptre, Kryptos, The Down Troddence, Crypted, Halakuah, Inner Sanctum, Scribe, and Cosmic Infusion. New emerging bands from India are now focused on spreading heavy metal and extreme metal music to the masses; there are frequent heavy metal gigs across India; though it is a niche in the genre, more and more people are becoming aware of the genre and bands like Orcus, Carnage INC, Primitiv, Eternal Returns, Kill chain, Emergency Trigger to name a few. From Central India, Nicotine, a band based in Indore, is widely credited of being one of the pioneers of heavy metal music in the region. In recent years, the a wave of Indian extreme metal bands are growing in popularity with bands like Brazen Molok, being the flag bearer of this new wave.

== Regional music scenes ==
Many cities and regions have produced collections of bands large enough to be classified as a scene within Indian rock. Kolkata, Shillong, Chennai, Mumbai and Bangalore have long been the principal founts of Indian rock and continue to produce bands regularly.

=== Bangalore scene ===
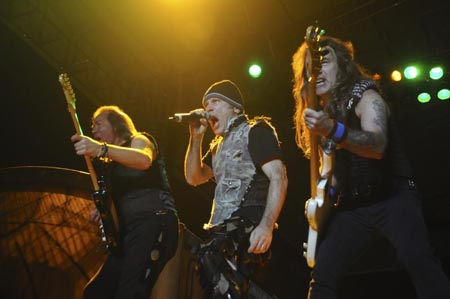
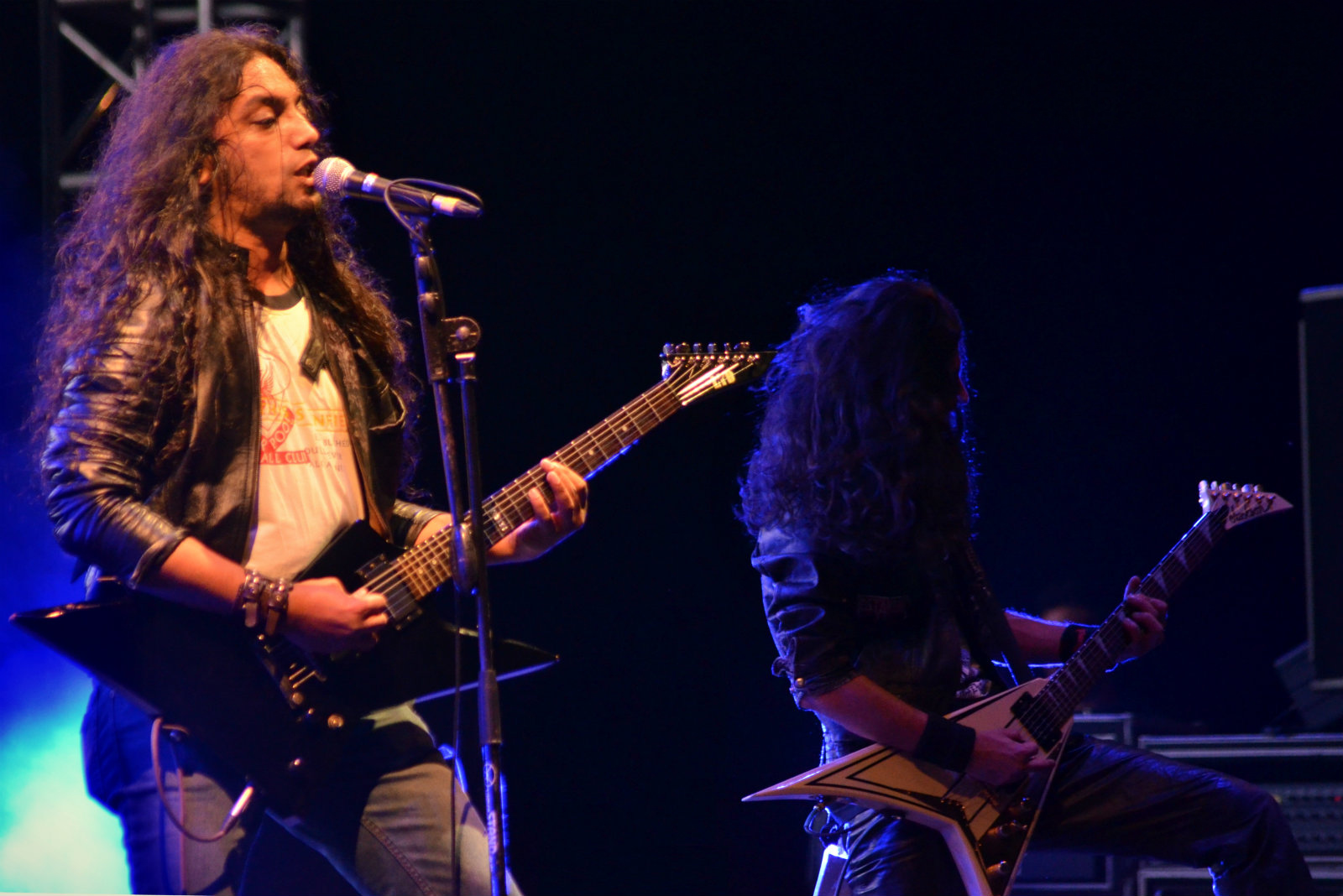
Heavy Metal group Iron Maiden performing live in Bangalore (top) and Kryptos performing at Harley Rock Riders Season III. (bottom)

The dominant music genres in urban Bangalore are rock and metal music. All subgenres of rock, varying from classic rock n' roll to extreme metal can be heard in Bangalore. The underground scenario in Bangalore is highly acclaimed, and though Shillong is called the Rock/Metal capital of India but that day is not far when Bangalore can take the fame away from Shillong. Notable bands from Bangalore include ManojGeorge4Strings, Raghu Dixit Project, Girish and The Chronicles (GATC), Kryptos, The Down Troddence (TDT) (originally from Kannur, Kerala), Inner Sanctum, Agam, All the Fat Children, The Usual Suspects, Final Surrender and Swarathma. Rock 'n India, Great Indian Rock and more recently Deccan Rock are the primitive rock festivals in India. Bangalore was also the first city in India where internationally popular rock groups Opeth, Iron Maiden, The Rolling Stones, Bryan Adams, Scorpions, Sting, Aerosmith, Elton John, Deep Purple, Metallica, Slayer, Megadeth, among various other heavy metal groups performed live for the first time in India.

Recent restrictions on live music in Bangalore's bars has affected the rock music culture of the city but is slowly recovering with pubs like Kyra, B Flat and Legends of Rock hosting more live bands. Festivals like Rock 'n India, Rock Ethos, Great Indian Rock and more recently Wrath Fest at Raipur and Deccan Rock continue to take place in Bangalore, a popular destination for international acts like Iron Maiden, Lamb of God, Bryan Adams, Scorpions, Sting, Aerosmith, Megadeth, Elton John, Metallica and Deep Purple.

=== Chennai scene ===
Another major Indian rock festival is the June Rock Out, organised by the Unwind Centre in Adyar, Chennai. There are also other smaller rock/metal festivals happening regularly in Bangalore and Chennai, like "Euphony", the "September Underground", "Last Band Standing", and the weekly "Live 101." The Bands Association of Chennai (BAC) is an organisation which actively promotes the cause of original music by Chennai bands such as Requiem Injustice, Grasshopper Green and Namma Ooru Boy Band (NOBB).

=== Delhi scene ===
Delhi's music circuit has seen its share of ups and downs, but has held on largely due to the local presence of Rock Street Journal. Delhi being the operational home of the Allahabad-based magazine, local bands have benefited by the proximity to India's first dedicated to stories and features based around rock and metal. The Great Indian Rock festival was mostly held in Delhi, now foraying into Kolkata, Mumbai and Bangalore, North-East India and Pune has exposed the upcoming musicians of India to a wider variety of musicians. Notable bands from Delhi include Indian Ocean, Them Clones, Menwhopause, Bandish, Advaita, Midival Punditz, Mrigya, Guillotine, and Antariksh.

=== Hyderabad scene ===
In Hyderabad bands like Sledge, Wreckage, Native Tongue has paved for upcoming bands by taking it to the nationals. They have won major rock and metal competitions such as campus rock idols 2004, 2005 and 2006 and headlining gigs across all major IT festivals in India taking charge of the Indian rock scene.

=== Indore scene ===
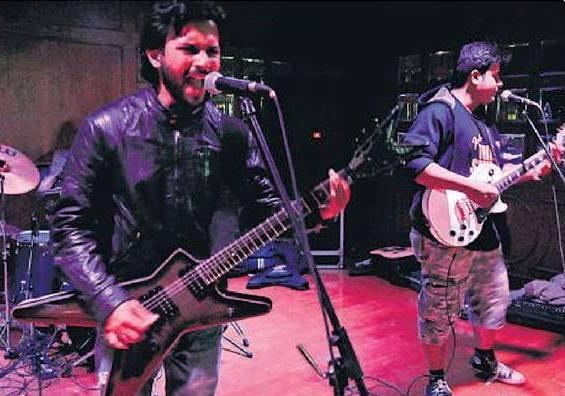
Nicotine playing at 'Pedal to the Metal', TDS, Indore, India in 2014.

The Indore scene (in Central India) initially ignored by the mainstream Rock/Metal fraternity has been emerging as the 'Dark Horse' of Indian Rock and Metal Scene since the mid-2000s. Though Metal dominates the scene, the city has produced bands from all kinds of the genre (Classic Rock, Alternative, Hard Rock, Death Metal).

Nicotine which was formed in December 2006, is widely credited for being the pioneers of Metal music, not just in the Indore but in Central India. Zero Gravity, another Metal band from the city, released their full-length album called 'Holocaust Awaits' in 2014.

Nicotine, Grim Reapers and Bliss are the only 3 bands to have qualified from the Central Zone of the 'Campus Rock Idols' Competition. Ceaseless Juncture and Perception as Reality are some of the existing active bands. There were bands like Avalanche, Auxiliary Triangle, Assault, Overdrive, Blindfolds which are now disbanded but won competitions outside the city. Though it is an independent scene, major bands from outside the city like BLAKC, Zygnema, Demonic Resurrection, Undying Inc, Albatross, etc. have performed in Indore.

Digvijay Bhonsale, a rock and metal vocalist, guitarist and songwriter from Indore has played several gigs in the United Kingdom and Zimbabwe.

=== Kerala scene ===
The state of Kerala produced one of India's first rock bands – 13 A.D. Kerala has produced some of the finest bands and musicians : Motherjane, Avial, The Down Troddence, Thaikkudam Bridge, Evergreen, ManojGeorge4Strings, Baiju Dharmajan and Rex Vijayan

=== Kolkata Scene ===
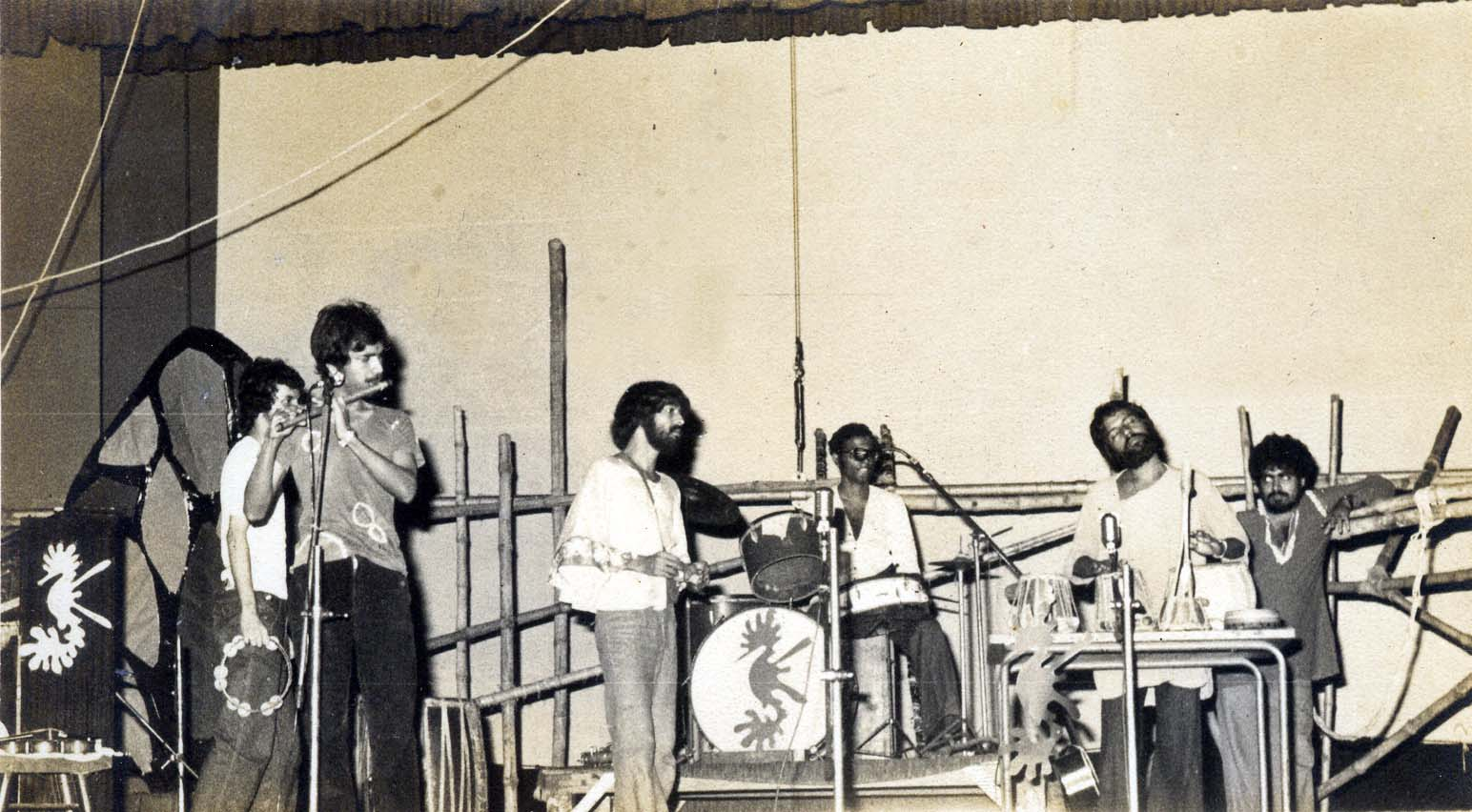
Moheener Ghoraguli in concert at Rabindra Sadan, 1979.

Bands from Kolkata that pioneered original music in English include Krosswindz, Cassini's Division, Skinny Alley, The Supersonics, and Five Little Indians. Kolkata-based singer-songwriter Jaimin Rajani has gained recognition for his folk rock English songs as an independent artist. There is also a massive regional rock scene and also some bands formed locally with international views in Kolkata that includes bands like Fossils, Cactus, Chandrabindoo, Krosswindz, Bhoomi, and Lakkhichhara.

In Kolkata, the underground Metal Bands organise an Event called The Pit at Tapan Theatre in Kalighat. In 2009, three editions of The Pit were successfully organised. It is being seen now that more events are being organised, like the metal events held by KOSMA (Kolkata Old School Metal Association). Other fests include 'Abomination', 'Order of the Heretical Trident Festival', 'Kolkata Open Air'. Bengali metal gigs attract huge crowds and are sponsored by various organisations. Kolkata also hosts an annual musical festival, The NH7 Weekender since 2013.

Moheener Ghoraguli, a Bengali independent music group from Kolkata, is arguably India and Bengal's first popular rock band.

=== Mumbai scene ===
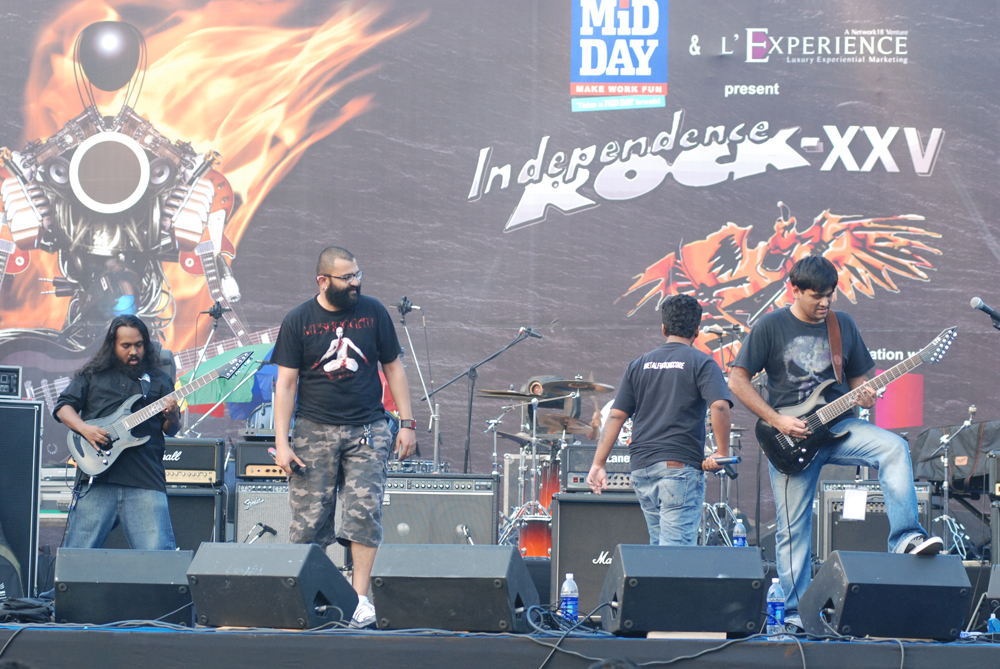
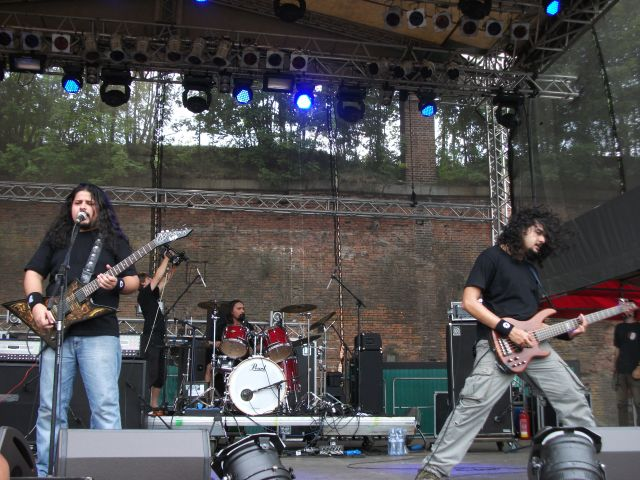
Bhayanak Maut performing at the 2010 Independence Rock XXV (top) and Demonic Resurrection performing live at Brutal Assault 2010. (bottom)

Some of the most notable contemporary rock bands from Mumbai are Pentagram, Tough on Tobacco, Bhayanak Maut, Demonic Resurrection, Split, Sridhar/Thayil, Scribe, and Goddess Gagged. The recent reunion of Indian rock pioneers Indus Creed was received with great enthusiasm, especially with regard to their plans to produce a new album in 2011.

Mumbai's longest-running festival has been the Independence Rock Festival. 2010 saw I-Rock, as it is popularly known, celebrate its 25th year. Independence Rock XXV paid tribute to the city that has hosted the festival by featuring a spate of local bands. The recently reunited Indus Creed headlined the festival, which included other local favourites like Bhayanak Maut, Scribe, Demonic Resurrection and Pralay, as well as stalwart musicians like Dhruv Ghanekar, Warren Mendonsa, Loy Mendonsa, Ehsaan Noorani, Farhad Wadia (the festival's founder and promoter), Ravi Iyer, Chandresh Kudwa, Shazneen Arethna and Sidd Coutto.

=== Pune scene ===
A relatively recent entry into the Indian Rock circuit is the city of Pune, home to acts such as Silver, Strange Brew, Jazz Mates, Nothing as Now and more. The live music scene of the twin cities Mumbai and Pune has been on the rise since 2005 with major International acts like Meshuggah, Tesseract, Satyricon, Freak Kitchen, Sahg. Pune plays host to an annual musical festival, The NH7 Weekender, which takes place in the month of November and showcases international (mostly British) acts like Imogen Heap, The Magic Numbers, Asian Dub Foundation and Reverend Soundsystem to name a few.

=== Ranchi scene ===
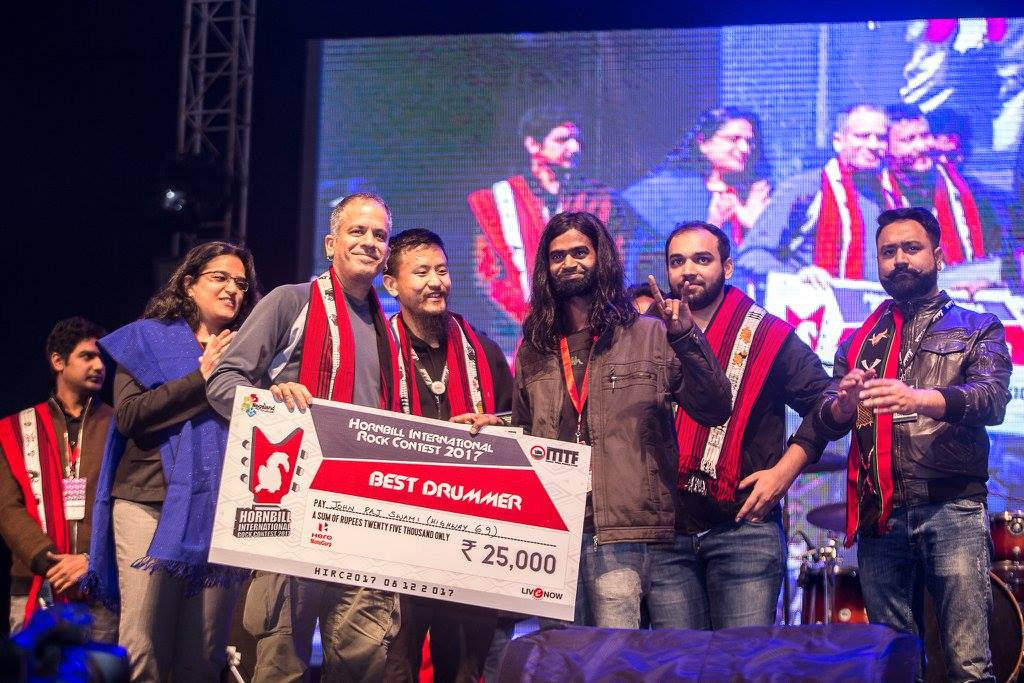
Highway 69's drummer receiving the Best Drummer award from Uday Benegal at Hornbill International Rock Contest 2017 in Nagaland.

Hailing from a small place quite unknown to the rest of the country, the bands of Ranchi from Jharkhand state had to face discrimination and hardships. Over the years, this city has produced some of the finest rock and metal music bands but they have always gone unnoticed because of being from a small town. In the 1990s, bands like Genesis, Kaalmantra and Sparsh have been considered as the pioneers to rock and metal music in Jharkhand. The city has had various music festivals being organized since the 2000s and a few of them are still organized today with the biggest one being Thunderstrock Festival and other notable festivals are like Rock Jatra and Rhapsody. The band Sparsh was aired live on CNN-IBN cheering up for the India national cricket team during the 2011 Cricket World Cup. The band 4 Degrees of Freedom were the finalists of Hornbill International Rock Contest 2013, followed by Highway 69 being twice the finalists at Hornbill International Rock Contest for 2017, 2018 along with their drummer winning the best drummer award in 2017 and Vikrit and Existence also being the finalists in 2018. The bands of Ranchi have been touring and performing across the country with currently Highway 69 being the most notable one as it has performed extensively all over the country and has evolved with a huge fan base, followed by other bands like Iris 13, Reciprocal, Existence, Vikrit etc. Other active and notable bands from the 2010s were Genesis, Kaalmantra, Sparsh, 4 Degrees of Freedom, Conflicting Resonance etc.

== Independent record labels ==
Mainstream record labels in India often ignore rock, with a few exceptions. Album sales range between a few hundred copies to a few thousand. They are rarely, if at all, affiliated to the Indian music industry, and sales are not usually monitored. Songs of Bollywood usually gain more popularity as compared to the songs of bands. This is a huge set back. Bands also fail to sell their songs throughout the country even after making it available to major music stores, this is only due to lack of interest of people in rock bands. There are only a few bands that have become successful in selling their songs throughout the country. People who enjoy rock get the songs of their favorite bands, just by a click from any music website (sometimes their songs are uploaded by website administrators just after the day of release, this is illegal as per copyright law, but even then no action is taken). Hence, overall sales become less than expected. Bands in India mostly perform live shows with low priced tickets (as low as Rs. 100 or even less). Probably, the growing and the upcoming generation will have interest in Indian Rock and Metal. But care has to be taken to retain the copyright of the music.

There are entities such as Green Ozone, DogmaTone Records, Cochym and Eastern Fare Music Foundation, Infestdead Records that are dedicated to promoting and supporting Indian rock, which could popularise the genre in the future.

== Documentary on Indian rock ==
In 2004, filmmaker qaushiq mukherji, popular as Q, directed a rockumentary named 'le pocha'. In 2008, music journalist Abhimanyu Kukreja directed Rockumentary – Becoming of Indian rock that was produced by NewsX and had a national TV release. The documentary is arguably the first of its kind on Indian rock that showcases the evolution of rock music in India starting from the 1960s. The documentary features popular and classic Indian bands like The Great Bear, High, The Great Society, Shiva, Indus Creed, Millennium and Parikrama. The documentary is available for free viewing on YouTube.

Leaving Home – the Life & Music of Indian Ocean (2010) directed by Jaideep Varma was about fusion rock band, Indian Ocean. Thus it became the first band ever in India to be subject of a documentary. At the 58th National Film Awards, the documentary went on to win the Award for Best Arts/Cultural Film.

In 2014, documentary filmmaker Raghav B directed a documentary on The Big Bangalore Metal Project – contributing to the Indian Metal Music Scene features popular Indian Metal Bands like Kryptos (band), Dying Embrace, BevarSea, Eccentric Pendulum, Inner Sanctum, Shepherd. The documentary was to show the Metal culture and the evolution of its music in Bangalore. The documentary is on YouTube.

== Issues faced ==
An all-girl rock band Pragash Band from Srinagar, Kashmir decided to call it quits after constant hate mails and death threats on the Internet, apart from the severe criticism and opposition from the religious leaders of Kashmir and other hardliner political parties.

== See also ==
- Asian Underground
- Atomic Forest
- Life in a... Metro
- Nicotine
- Regional Rock music of West Bengal popularly known as Bangla rock
- Rock On!!
- The Vinyl Records
