= Dum Maro Dum =

Dum Maro Dum (transl. take a puff, in Hindi; English: "Take Another Toke") may refer to:

- "Dum Maro Dum" (song), by Asha Bhosle from the 1971 Indian film Hare Rama Hare Krishna
- Dum Maaro Dum (film), 2011 Indian action-thriller film by Rohan Sippy
  - Dum Maaro Dum (soundtrack), soundtrack of the 2011 film by Pritam
