= The Global Desi =

2021 non-fiction book by Sundeep Bhutoria

The Global Desi: Reflections on Home and Away
- Author: Sundeep Bhutoria
- Language: English
- Subject: food & travel, literature, and social issues
- Genre: Travel book
- Publisher: Pan Macmillan
- Publication date: 2021
- Publication place: India
- Media type: hardbound book
- Pages: 256
- ISBN: 9789390742318

The Global Desi: Reflections on Home and Away is a book by Indian author and culturist Sundeep Bhutoria. It was published by Pan Macmillan in 2021. The book covers the author's travel memories, and describes his experiences of Indian food in the cities he visited, following the author's encounters with the people of various countries — from Norway to Chile, and from Brazil to Rome. Originally published as columns in various newspapers, the contents of the book are divided into three topics — food & travel, literature and social issues.

== Contents ==
The Global Desi is a compilation of Sundeep Bhutoria's memoirs. It gives an account of his travels in abroad. It mainly focuses on three topics travel, literature and social issues. In the book, author has tried to connect with people of Indian origin (PIO) in the courtiers he visited. The foreword of the book has been written by Usha Uthup.

== Reception ==
Usha Uthup said that the book "is not just a compelling account of what Sundeep stands for; it is also a celebration of the values that make our culture one of the oldest and most glorious cultures known to humankind". The Tribune wrote: "some of the pieces [of the book] might have been written years ago, but have a quality of timelessness about them". Writer Romola Butalia praised the book for its 'colorful depiction' and 'engaging account' of Indian culture.
