= Chinmayi Tripathi =

Indian singer, songwriter, composer and poet

- Born: Sagar, Madhya Pradesh, India
- Origin: India
- Occupations: Singer; Songwriter; Composer; Poet
- Years active: 2009–present

Chinmayi Tripathi is an Indian singer, songwriter, composer and poet. She is known for her work in independent music and for setting Hindi and Urdu literary poetry to contemporary musical compositions. She is the founder of the Music & Poetry Project, subsequently associated with the name Kavyaraag, which aims to introduce Indian poetry to contemporary audiences through music.

Tripathi began learning Hindustani classical music during childhood and subsequently developed an interest in songwriting and composition. Her musical projects include the albums Sun Zara and Mann Bawra, the Music & Poetry Project and collaborations with composer and musician Joell Mukherjii. She has also worked in Hindi film and digital entertainment music, including singing the title track of the 2020 film Suraj Pe Mangal Bhari.

== Early life and education ==
Tripathi was born in Sagar, Madhya Pradesh, India. She comes from a family with an interest in literature and music. Her father is a Sanskrit scholar, while her mother taught Hindi literature. She began receiving formal training in Hindustani classical music at the age of six under Dr Alakh Nanda Palnitkar, who headed the Department of Music at Sagar University. Her parents encouraged her to learn music and that she continued practising classical music while pursuing her education. She studied science at school and subsequently undertook management studies before moving towards a career in music.

She was trained on classical music under Guru, Dr Alakananda Palnitkar.

== Career ==
=== Early career and Songdew ===
Tripathi started her musical career by writing and performing original compositions. One of her early songs, Aali, was released on the social networking platform.

She subsequently released two albums, Sun Zara and Mann Bawra, featuring original compositions that combined elements of Indian music with contemporary arrangements. She also formed a fusion band called Spice Route with fellow musicians. The band performed original compositions alongside selected classical music pieces.

=== Music & Poetry Project ===
In 2017, Tripathi initiated the Music & Poetry Project, a musical initiative based on Hindi literary poetry. The idea emerged from her interest in introducing the works of established Hindi poets to audiences who might not otherwise encounter their writings. She developed the project after noticing the limited presence of classical Hindi poetry in contemporary independent music.

The project was supported through a crowdfunding campaign on the Wishberry platform. Tripathi composed and performed the music, adapting selected poems into songs while attempting to retain their literary meaning. The album featured works by poets including Mahadevi Verma, Suryakant Tripathi 'Nirala', Ramdhari Singh Dinkar, Harivansh Rai Bachchan, Shivmangal Singh Suman, Dharamvir Bharati, Anamika and Maithilisharan Gupt.

The first song released under the project was Khushgappiyan, based on a poem by contemporary Hindi poet Anamika. The album also featured contributions from musicians including Baiju Dharmajan, Sharat Chandra Shrivastav, Susmit Sen and Shujaat Khan. Actor and singer Piyush Mishra contributed poetry recitations to the project.

The project attracted media attention for its attempt to bring Hindi literary poetry into contemporary musical formats. The Nehru Centre in London featured Tripathi and the Music & Poetry Project in its Women in Music programme in June 2018.

=== Kavyaraag and musical collaborations ===
Tripathi subsequently developed the Music & Poetry Project in collaboration with composer and musician Joell Mukherjii. The initiative became associated with the name Kavyaraag and continued to explore the relationship between Indian literary poetry and contemporary music.

The project includes musical interpretations of Hindi and Urdu poetry, as well as compositions based on devotional and traditional literary works. Its repertoire includes the writings of Kabir, Mirabai, Mahadevi Verma, Nirala, Dinkar, Faiz Ahmed Faiz and other poets.

=== Film and digital music ===
Tripathi has also worked as a playback singer in film and digital entertainment music. In 2020, she sang the title track of the Hindi film Suraj Pe Mangal Bhari, directed by Abhishek Sharma. The song was composed and produced by Kingshuk Chakravarty, with lyrics by Abhishek Sharma, and featured vocals by Sanj V and Tripathi.

She also performed Tu Hi Tu for the third season of the Hindi web series Kehne Ko Humsafar Hain.

=== Independent releases ===
Apart from her poetry-based compositions, Tripathi has continued to release independent music. Her work includes Yugan Yugan Hum Yogi, based on a poem by Kabir, released in 2022. The recording featured Tripathi alongside Joell Mukherjii and other musicians.

She also collaborated with singer, songwriter and composer Swanand Kirkire on the independent track O Re Manaa, released in September 2022. Tripathi is credited as its composer, with Kirkire and Joell among the performers.
