= Savage (band) =

British heavy metal band

- Savage's first album Loose 'n Lethal

Background information
- Origin: Mansfield, Nottinghamshire, England
- Genres: Heavy metal, NWOBHM
- Years active: 1978–1986, 1995–present
- Labels: Minus2Zebra, Neat, Zebra, Ebony, Sanctuary, Black Dragon, Suspect
- Members: Andy Dawson (guitar); Mark Nelson (drums); Kristian Bradley (guitar)
- Past members: Dave Lindley; Wayne Renshaw; Mark Brown; Chris Bradley

Savage are a British heavy metal band from Mansfield, Nottinghamshire, that formed in 1978. They were part of the new wave of British heavy metal.

The band is most remembered for the song titled "Let it Loose", a track which made significant impact on the early 1980s metal scene (indeed, it was later covered by Metallica on their Whiskey Audition Tape demo), and would later give rise to the name of their first album, Loose 'n Lethal, released in 1983.

== History ==
The group was formed in 1976 by 16-year-old bass player Chris Bradley, vocalist Chris Gent, guitarist Lee Statham and drummer Mick Percival, but after only one official gig the band disbanded and was re-formed in 1978 by Bradley, joined by Andy Bradbury on guitar, Simon Dawson on drums and his 15-year-old brother Andy Dawson on guitar. Line-up issues continued as Andy Bradbury was replaced by Wayne Renshaw, and Simon Dawson left to be replaced after a long period of searching by Dave Lindley. This was the line up that appeared on the compilation albums Scene of the Crime (featuring "Let it Loose"), Metal Fatigue and the double A-side single "Ain't No Fit Place" / "The China Run". Lindley left shortly after this as was replaced by Mark Brown of Tyrant (another Mansfield based band that had appeared on Scene of the Crime).

In 1980, they released their first demo tape. In 1981, they managed to release Scene of the Crime and, what would be their most renowned song, "Let it Loose". The song incorporated a sound bordering on speed and thrash metal, and influenced many bands to follow similar styles.

In 1982, Ebony Records picked up the band. Their first release under the Ebony label was a track for a compilation titled Metal Fatigue. The release was met with good reviews, so Savage decided to release a self-financed double A-side single through the Ebony label, which also sold well. Their debut album, Loose 'n Lethal was released the following year. Although being an impressive unit receiving compliments from magazines, fans, and bands, Savage lacked strong record label support.

In 1984, the band decided to leave Ebony Records and signed to a new label, Zebra Records, part of Cherry Red Records. At the end of the year they issued their first release for Zebra, the 12" EP We Got the Edge. This was followed by what was considered a radically different sounding second album, Hyperactive, which although gaining great reviews, the band were unable to capitalise on due to a lack of support from management or record company. Frustrated, the band disbanded in 1986, resurfacing in 1995 at the request of fans during the height of grunge releasing their third album Holy Wars, once again to critical acclaim. Albums followed in 1998, Babylon, and 2001, Xtreme Machine. A protracted hiatus then followed, fuelled by significant personal and family issues that were impacting all members of the band. The band resurfaced in 2011 with a new album Sons of Malice, again receiving significant critical acclaim with founding and driving members Chris Bradley and Andy Dawson, joined by Kris Bradley (Chris's son and Andy's nephew) on guitar and Mark Nelson on drums. The band have returned to the festival circuit.

Bass guitarist Chris Bradley died after a long illness on 6 November 2025.

== Discography ==
=== Albums ===
- Loose 'n Lethal (Ebony Records, 1983)
- Hyperactive (Zebra Records, 1985)
- Holy Wars (Neat Records, 1995)
- Babylon (Neat Records, 1996)
- Xtreme Machine (Neat Records, 2001)
- This Ain't No Fit Place (Best of compilation album, Sanctuary Records, 2002)
- Sons of Malice (Minus2Zebra & Infestdead Records, 2012)
- 7 (Minus2Zebra, 2015)

=== Singles ===
- "Ain't No Fit Place" / "The China Run" (Ebony Records, 1982)
- "We Got the Edge" (Zebra Records, 1984)
- "Cardiac" (Black Dragon, 1986)

=== Appearances on compilation albums ===
- Scene of the Crime (Suspect Records, 1981) – "Let it Loose" and "Dirty Money"
- Metal Fatigue (Ebony Records, 1982) – "Ain't No Fit Place"

== See also ==
- List of new wave of British heavy metal bands
