= Them Clones =

Indian rock band

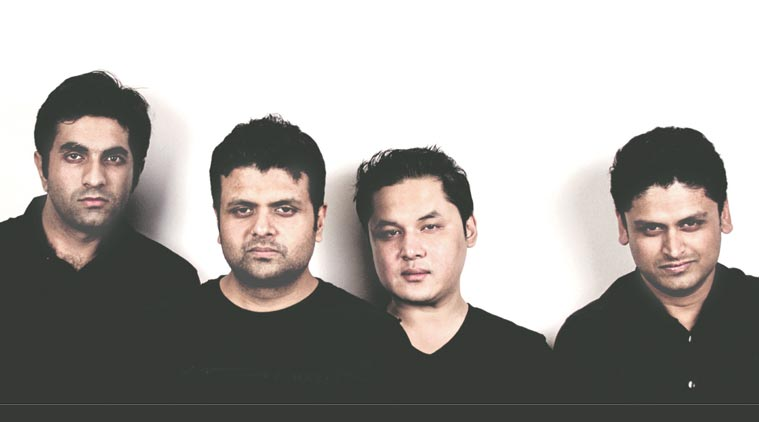
- From left to right: Akshay Raheja, Surojit Dev, Joseph Lalhmachhuana, Prithwish Dev, New Delhi, August 2015

Background information
- Origin: New Delhi, India
- Genre: Alternative rock
- Years active: 2000–present
- Members: Akshay Raheja; Surojit Dev; Joseph Lalhmachhuana; Prithwish Dev; Rohit Kulkarni (Sessions); Abhishek Mittal (Sessions)
- Past members: Ashish Ddavidd; Clarence Gonsalvez; Romit Gupta; Gucci Singh; Ravi Singh; Abeer Verma
- Website: www.themclones.com

Them Clones is an Indian rock band, formed in August 2000 in New Delhi.

The band started in a bedroom in South Delhi's RK Puram area, resonating with drum loops and guitar riffs from where they were kicked out due to "excessive noise". The search for a new jam pad led them to other neighbourhoods, where they attempted covers of popular rock and grunge classics followed by the release of their own singles. They began by touring the Delhi University music scene and won many noted competitions.

The band members were the "chosen ones" at the Channel [V] LaunchPad in 2005 and were voted as the "Best Band" at Jack Daniel's Rock Awards in 2006 and 2007. In 2007, they were 2nd runners up at the Channel [V] AMP Big Break All Asia. They followed this up at The Jack Daniel's Rock Awards 2009 by winning "Best Song", "Best Vocalist" and "Best Drummer" awards. "My Life" also was awarded the Best Song in the Rock Category at the IMA Awards.

October 2009 witnessed their debut album Love.Hate.Heroes with Counter Culture Records / EMI Records.

Post their debut album, the Clones dropped Singles in 2011, All About a Heart Break and Jealousy as well as its video followed by Season 2 Singles in 2013. They started their own festival Clonefest in 2011 which happens annually in New Delhi.

== See also ==
- Indian rock
- Kryptos (band)
- Bhayanak Maut
- Nicotine (band)
- Inner Sanctum (band)
- Demonic Resurrection
