= Vani Ganapathy =

Indian classical dancer

- Born: 6 June 1950 (age 76)
- Occupation: Dancer
- Known for: Bharatanatyam
- Spouse: Kamal Haasan (m. 1978; div. 1988)

Vani Ganapathy, also spelled as Vani Ganpati, is an Indian classical dancer.

== Career ==
She started performing when she was seven, and has travelled across the world for her performances. She lives in Bangalore, where she set up Sanchari, a dance academy.

== Film career ==
She started her acting career in Bollywood films in 1972.

== Personal life ==
In 1978, Vani married actor Kamal Haasan. She acted with Haasan in the 1975 movie Melnaattu Marumagal. After they were married, Vani worked as Haasan's costume designer for several movies. They divorced ten years later in 1988.

== Filmography ==
Key
†	Denotes Film that have not yet been released

Year	Film	Role	Language	Notes	Ref.
1973	Pyaasi Nadi		Hindi	Debut Hindi film	
1975	Andhera		Hindi		
1975	Melnaattu Marumagal	Dancer	Tamil	Special appearance in a dance sequence	
