= Amit Saigal =

Indian musician (1965–2012)

- Born: 6 July 1965; Allahabad, India
- Died: 5 January 2012 (aged 46); Goa, India
- Occupation(s): Rock musician & Promoter of Rock music in India
- Years active: 1993–2012
- Organization: Entertainment Media Services Pvt. Ltd.
- Known for: Founder of Rock Street Journal
- Notable work: Rock Street Journal
- Spouse: Shena
- Children: Aditi "Dot" Saigal
- Website: rsjonline.com

Amit Saigal (6 July 1965 – 5 January 2012) was an Indian rock musician, promoter of Indian independent music, publisher and impresario. Saigal co-founded the music magazine Rock Street Journal with his wife Shena Gamat building a community of musicians, artists, new audiences and music business professionals that did not exist for independent music at the time in India.

== Career ==
Amit Saigal performed in a band called IMPACT playing classic rock song covers. Playing english rock music was not very popular but he understood the potential of its niche demand. In 1993, Saigal teamed up with his wife Shena Gamat and created Rock Street Journal (RSJ). It became the first rock and independent music magazine of India featuring domestic musicians and bands. They printed 2,500 copies of RSJ from his hometown, Allahabad and set out to distribute in college campuses in urban cities. Quite swiftly, it caught the attention of the youth and opened up doors for an alternative community of musicians and audiences waiting to find a common ground.

== Great Indian Rock Festival (aka GIR) 1995-2010 ==
Saigal used RSJ to promote independent music artists and founded GREAT INDIAN ROCK festival (GIR). The first edition happened in 1995 at a cultural centre in Calcutta called Nandan, drawing a crowd of approximately 5000 people. He also used the Satellite television boom to the festival's advantage and invited MTV VJ Danny McGill for coverage. Since 1995, GIR ran 15 editions of increasingly large sized capacity events until 2010. GIR's added opportunity of creating a compilation album with songs of selected artists via process of entry was a new format at the time and quickly became popular among the upcoming indie music scene across the nation. Artists/bands who made it to this compilation album were given a slot to perform at the festival, making it one of the most desired platforms for aspiring musicians. Each edition of GIR became an annual attraction for a growing new audience and gradually brands like Levi's, Pepsi, Royal Stag, TVS Apache and many more associated with the festival as it expanded to more cities like Delhi, Mumbai, Pune and Bangalore. Saigal was also able to book international artists like metal giants Meshuggah (Sweden), Guitar virtuosos Shawn Lane (USA), Mattias Eklundh (Norway) who performed with the Indian percussionist V. Selvaganesh and an array of unique artists to headline at GIR as their debut performances in India.

== Pub Rock Fest and Global Groove 2002-2010 ==
Next, Saigal created PUB ROCK FEST promoting rock/indie music and GLOBAL GROOVE for electronica music introducing and launching new artists in various clubs & small sized venues across the country. This opened up more opportunities for artists and created a new generation of promoters with a growing audience that was hungry for more alternative music other than the usual mainstream Bollywood music events.

== India Music Week (aka IMW) 2011-2016 ==
In 2011, Saigal founded India's first global music conference & showcase music festival INDIA MUSIC WEEK (IMW) in collaboration with Rikskonsertene, Concerts Norway. Saigal introduced a unique format as the festival started with a two-days music conference inviting delegates from India, Norway, Sweden, UK & Germany starting in New Delhi while showcasing 50 domestic and international artists across New Delhi, Mumbai and Bangalore, the events taking places at multiple venues in each city, all simultaneously happening within one week. IMW became the first Indian music festival that encouraged Indian independent musicians to perform at international music festivals and vice versa through a unique exchange program that had never happened before for indie artists. RSJ's music exchange programs were able to export Indian bands like Bombay Black, Orange Street, Scribe, Demonic Resurrection, Undying Inc. and many more who got opportunities to perform at festivals in USA, Sweden, Estonia, UK and Norway.

Between the years 1995-2012, Saigal was able to make breakthroughs across multiple genres at a time when no promoters or agencies were ready to take risks with non-mainstream artists. RSJ started booking artists that had never been booked in India before like Modeselektor (electronica producers from Germany), Meshuggah (metal band from Sweden), Jaga Jazzist (experimental jazz band from Norway), Freak Kitchen (heavy metal band from Sweden), Lemaitre (electronica producers from Norway), Dub Inc. (reggae/dub band from France), Shawn Lane (guitar virtuoso from USA), John Myung from the legendary US progressive metal band Dream Theater and Tesseract (progressive metal band from UK). This new range of programming new artists debuting in India enabled Saigal and RSJ to become tastemakers while creating new audiences in the world of live music venues & festivals across the country. It was a game changing moment.

Amit Saigal and his brand RSJ gained national & international presence and with their experience in music business spanning over 25 years and created a thriving independent music community of musicians, artists and music business professionals. This also earned him a popular nickname being called as "Papa Rock". His contribution is unprecedented and considered as the reason for everything that music lovers know about Indian independent music today. RSJ's goodwill exists wide and the brand is especially known for their iconic music festivals like GIR, IMW and more importantly for being the first ever indie music magazine that a large generation accepted and subscribed until the digital world took over. RSJ has an active website promoting artists with Amit Saigal's vision even today.

== Death ==
On 5 January 2012, while on vacation, Saigal and his friends had gone for a swim after anchoring his sailboat off Bogmalo beach in Goa. Saigal reportedly drowned for unknown reasons. By the time lifeguards could reach him, he was already dead.

== See also ==
- Rock music
