= Rock Street Journal =

Monthly magazine covering the rock scene in India and South Asia

- Rock Street Journal, September - October
- Editor: Amit Saigal
- Categories: Rock
- Frequency: Monthly
- Circulation: 1, 42,000
- Publisher: Amit Saigal
- First issue: January 1993
- Company: Entertainment Media Services Pvt. Ltd.
- Country: India
- Language: English
- Website: www.rsjonline.com

Rock Street Journal or RSJ is a monthly magazine covering the rock scene in India and South Asia. It was started in January 1993 in Allahabad by Amit Saigal and Shena Gamat Saigal after they noted the lack of a support system for Indian rock musicians. The magazine has grown in popularity ever since and is now published from Delhi. It organizes the yearly Great Indian Rock Festival (GIR) to promote original music of new and upcoming rock bands in India.

== History ==
Amit Saigal and Sam Eric Lal used to perform in a band called Impact in the 1980s. They realized that there was no support system in place for new and upcoming rock musicians and bands in India. They only had college fests as platforms. According to Sam, "The community was large and strong but very fragmented at the same time. When we thought about this, we decided to come up with RSJ which would provide news about rock music anywhere in the country." It began as an informal newsletter for bands and grew to become a magazine and events company that nurtured the scene. It sponsored college fests, coaxed pubs into hosting bands on certain nights, and organized its own rock festival. And thus RSJ was born to bring a sense of community among these struggling musicians, the first issue published from Allahabad in January 1993. It was initially planned as subscription-only magazine. Amit promoted the magazine in college festivals but only sold a handful of subscriptions at that time. The magazine has grown substantially since then, and has a circulation of 1, 42,000 copies per issue.

== Features ==
RSJ regularly covers professional and college festival concerts throughout India. It also publishes reviews of new music albums, new bands, old bands and everything that falls under the gamut of the Indian and the international rock scene, they also publish reviews of Indian Bands along with extensive reviews and interviews of International bands. Its website has an extensive database of over a thousand rock bands and musicians hailing from the Indian subcontinent, including desi rock bands from elsewhere in the world. The website also contains the official forums frequented by thousands of Indian rock fans. Between 2004 and 2007, a thread called the "Deadman show" was the most visited and read thread in the forum. Currently boasting of a registered database of over 40,000. Over the years RSJ changed the overall approach to the content and now covers an array of varied music and concerts. The magazine also regularly does free CD releases every month. The latest initiative however is the Breaking Boundaries Split EP series which features music from across the globe and renowned bands. The first edition featured Textures, New Way Home and Indian metal legends Bhayanak Maut, Scribe and Undying Inc. The second edition is rumored to feature bands like Tesseract, Fell Silent and hardcore band Norris from Canada.

== Concerts and music festivals ==
RSJ organizes the Great Indian Rock Festival each year showcasing the best among upcoming talent in rock and roll in the Indian subcontinent. The first GIR was in 1997 in Kolkata. It is usually held in Delhi in the month of February, in the 11th year of GIR; Norway's biggest Black Metal Act Enslaved were headlining. In addition, RSJ has organized several other concerts including the Concert for Tibet in 2003 in Dharamsala, and the Brotherhood of Rock in Shillong. RSJ has also conceptualised and executed events like the Pubrockfest and RocktoberFest which are now regular events in Delhi, however the PubrockFest went national this year going to 7 cities and with over 30 gigs in all. This year the Pubrockfest is bigger going to 20 cities with 60 gigs and also features two international artistes from Australia and Canada respectively. 2007 also saw the inception of a new festival called LiveAlive - Experience Jazz, Blues and Beyond, this festival focused on music like jazz, blues and other experimental music. Every year in November, Jazz fans in Delhi get a treat in the form of The Jazz Utsav which is organised by Capital Jazz in association with Rock Street Journal, the Jazz Utsav features some of the biggest acts in Jazz from across the globe. Over the years the number of festivals have grown and the key festivals that RSJ does includes Great Indian Rock, Live Alive, Pubrockfest, Rocktoberfest, Global Groove and Jazz Utsav.

== See also ==
- Indian rock
