= Bharat Ki Shaan: Singing Star =

Indian Television Series

- Genre: Reality
- Presented by: Season 1 Abhas Joshi; Deepali Kishore; Season2; Manoj Tiwari
- Judges: Season 1 Bappi Lahiri; Kavita Krishnamurthy; Season 2 Ismail Darbar; Usha Uthup; Season 3 Lalit Pandit; Usha Uthup; Anand Raj Anand; Poornima (singer)
- Country of origin: India
- Original language: Hindi
- No. of seasons: 3

Production
- Producer: Gajendra Singh
- Camera setup: Multi-camera
- Production company: Saaibaba Telefilms

Original release
- Network: DD National
- Release: present

Related
- Singing Star of U.P (reality show)

Bharat Ki Shaan: Singing Star is an Indian television singing competition series broadcast on DD National. The series is produced by Gajendra Singh of Saaibaba Telefilms.

== Seasons ==
=== Season 1 ===
The Grand-Finale of the 1st season was held on 1 March 2010. The winner of the 2010 cycle was Sumit Khatri, who received a trophy and two Bajaj Discover Bikes. The 1st runner-up was Sanjeev Kumar and the 2nd runner- up was Arindam Chakrabarti.

=== Season 2 ===
The second season premiered on 23 April 2012. The winner of the 2nd season was Mamta Raut and runners up were Osama Noor and Akash Ojha. It was hosted by Manoj Tiwari. Tiwari also sang a song in movie Gangs of Wasseypur.

=== Season 3 ===
The third season was hosted by Manoj Tiwari again and won by Vishal Mishra. Vishal Mishra also won Bharat Ki Shaan Mahavijeta. Vibhor Parashar was the 1st runner-up in both Season 3 and Bharat Ki Shaan Mahavijeta. Amika Shail became 2nd runner-up in Season3 and also won.
