= Melnaattu Marumagal =

- Theatrical release poster
- Directed by: A. P. Nagarajan
- Written by: A. P. Nagarajan
- Produced by: C. N. Venkatasamy
- Starring: Sivakumar; Kamal Haasan; 'Kumari' Laurance Pourtale; Jayasudha; Jr. Balaiah
- Cinematography: K. S. Prasanth
- Edited by: T. Vijayarangam
- Music by: Kunnakudi Vaidyanathan
- Production company: C. N. V. Movies
- Release date: 10 May 1975
- Running time: 132 minutes
- Country: India
- Language: Tamil

Melnaattu Marumagal (transl. Western Daughter-in-law) is a 1975 Indian Tamil-language film directed by A. P. Nagarajan, and produced by C. N. Venkatasamy under C. N. V. Movies. The film stars Sivakumar, Laurance Pourtale, Kamal Haasan and Jayasudha. Vani Ganapathy, a danseuse appeared only for a dance sequence alongside Haasan, whom she later married in 1978. The film was released on 10 May 1975. In 1976, it was remade in Telugu as America Ammayi.

== Plot ==
The film is about two brothers, Mohan and Raja, and their spouses. Mohan marries a European girl who admires Tamil culture and tradition. Meanwhile, Raja marries a Tamil girl who is attracted to Western customs.

== Cast ==
- Sivakumar as Mohan
- Kamal Haasan as Raja
- 'Kumari' Laurance Pourtale as Meena
- Jayasudha as Sudha
- Jr. Balaiah as Valu
- S. V. Ramadas
- Gandhimathi as Pangajam
- Poornam Viswanathan as Pazhanivel
- V. Gopalakrishnan
- Usha Uthup
- Vani Ganapathy in a guest appearance
- Cho Ramaswamy in a guest appearance
- Manorama in a guest appearance

== Soundtrack ==
The music was composed by Kunnakudi Vaidyanathan. Viji Manuel was the film's keyboardist.

Song	Singers	Lyrics
"How Wonderful"	S. P. Balasubrahmanyam, Vani Jairam	Poovai Senguttavan
"Kalaimagal Kai Veenai"	Vani Jairam	Tiruchy Bharathan
"Love Is A Beautiful"	Usha Uthup	Nellai Arulmani
"Muththamizhil Paada"	Vani Jairam	Ulandhurpettai Shanmugam
"Pallandu Pallandu"	Vani Jairam, T. K. Kala	Geethapriyan
"Sugam Tharum"	Rajesh, Manohari	Kuyili

== Reception ==
Kanthan of Kalki praised the performances of Sivakumar, Kamal Haasan and Poornam Viswanathan but felt none of the songs stay in the mind and called the cinematography average.
