= Great Indian Rock =

Great Indian Rock (GIR) was a multi-city rock music festival in India. The first of its kind, it was usually held annually in cities like Delhi, Mumbai, Bangalore, Pune, Hyderabad, Kolkata and Shillong, with a cumulative audience of approximately 50,000 people. The first GIR was held in 1997 as a two-day festival in Kolkata. The festival is organized by the media and publishing company Entertainment Media Services Private Limited, which also publishes the magazine Rock Street Journal. The festival was founded by rock journalist and promoter Amit Saigal, who died in 2012. Subsequently, according to Mint, the "Great Indian Rock Festival in Delhi called it a day after 15 years…in 2012."

GIR started in the form of a competition amongst bands, where entries were called from all over the country in the form of physical cassettes and CDs. 12 bands were chosen out of more than a thousand entries at the end of an extensive week-long exercise of listening to each and every band's music which was personally conducted by the organizers at RSJ. The 12 shortlisted bands finally performed in a grand finale along with an international headliner which was the GIR Festival.

Each edition of Great Indian Rock was also accompanied by an album compiling the songs of the shortlisted bands known as the "GIR Compilation," consisting of 12 original compositions by 12 bands from various regions of India. The album would be circulated across India through Rock Street Journal magazine. Great Indian Rock stopped being a competition in 2007.

In addition to featuring Indian musicians like Parikrama, Orange Street, and Indian Ocean, the festival has also hosted international artists like Shawn Lane, Jonas Hellborg, John Myung, Meshuggah, Tesseract, and Intronaut, and Satyricon.
