= Dum Maaro Dum (soundtrack) =

Soundtrack album by Pritam
- Released: 12 March 2011
- Recorded: 2010–2011
- Genre: Feature film soundtrack
- Length: 37:49
- Label: T-Series
- Producer: Pritam

Pritam chronology
Thank You (2011)	Dum Maaro Dum (2011)	Kucch Luv Jaisaa (2011)

Dum Maaro Dum is the soundtrack album to the 2011 film of the same name directed by Rohan Sippy, starring Abhishek Bachchan, Bipasha Basu, Rana Daggubati, Prateik Babbar, Aditya Pancholi and Govind Namdeo. The film's music is composed by Pritam which featured eight songs with lyrics written by Jaideep Sahni. It was the first Indian film soundtrack to be mixed in Dolby Surround 7.1. The album was released under the T-Series label on 12 March 2011.

== Development ==
Dum Maaro Dum's music is composed by Pritam and the background score by Midival Punditz and Karsh Kale. The song "Dum Maro Dum"—on which the film was titled after, and originally based from Hare Rama Hare Krishna (1971), composed by R. D. Burman and sung by Asha Bhosle—was remixed for the film, featuring Deepika Padukone in a special appearance. Pritam recalled that he had lip synced in the female voice for the verses "Duniya Ne Humko Diya Kya" and had to record the actual female voice but decided to include his version which was liked by the crew.

Sippy decided to shoot a song with Abhishek as his character—based on Amitabh's role from Zanjeer (1973)—"was getting too serious" and had to be "lightened up". Sippy contacted Pritam to compose a song for the character, where Abhishek would not lip sync and is played whenever his character appears onscreen. Sippy added that Abhishek lip syncing to the song would make it out of character and insisted him to compose a background song. The track became "Thayn Thayn"; Pritam added that "the song will have the mellow subtle sober and soft, to go with Abhishek's subdued character". Abhishek performed rap versions of the song.

The soundtrack was mixed in Dolby Surround 7.1, becoming the first Indian film soundtrack to do so. The mixing was conducted by FutureWorks Media Ltd. with Manas Ranjan Choudhury as sound designer and Debojit Changmai as sound mixing engineer.

== Release ==
The soundtrack was preceded with the title track of the film—"Mit Jaaye Gham", the remix of "Dum Maaro Dum"—which was released on 12 March 2011 during the 2011 Cricket World Cup match between India and South Africa. The album was also released on that date under the T-Series label.

== Track listing ==
All lyrics are written by Jaideep Sahni.

No.	Title	Singer(s)	Length
1.	"Jaana Hai"	Zubeen Garg	6:15
2.	"Jiyein Kyun"	Papon	4:26
3.	"Mit Jaaye Gham (Dum Maaro Dum)"	Anushka Manchanda	3:54
4.	"Te Amo" (Duet)	Ash King, Sunidhi Chauhan	4:46
5.	"Te Amo" (Female)	Sunidhi Chauhan	5:05
6.	"Te Amo" (Reprise)	Mohit Chauhan	4:55
7.	"Thayn Thayn"	Abhishek Bachchan, Earl, Ayush Phukan	3:23
8.	"Te Amo" (Remix)	Ash King, Sunidhi Chauhan	5:05
Total length:			37:49

== Critical reception ==
Critic based at Indo-Asian News Service wrote "Pritam has proved with this album that he has the capability of churning out interesting tracks". Nikhil Hemarjani of Hindustan Times stated "the soundtrack is a hit and a miss. It's a letdown as the music isn't as snazzy as you'd expect it to be, but certain tracks will make it worth your while." Joginder Tuteja of Bollywood Hungama wrote "Dum Maaro Dum has two potential hits in the form of its title song and 'Thayn Thayn'. Though one expected at least one more chartbuster here to give an all around popular appeal to the album, one is still reasonably content with what Dum Maaro Dum has to offer. Now it has to be seen that with these two tracks in hands, how far do the makers and the music company go to unleash them in the biggest possible way and make Dum Maaro Dum an album that would make the best use of a relatively open season ahead." Karthik Srinivasan of Milliblog called the music "selectively entertaining". A reviewer from Yahoo News wrote "Dum Maaro Dum has the sufficient musical 'dum' (punch) to offer and entertains with mix 'n' match of fast-beat tracks and melodies. If quality is given a major concern then soundtracks like 'Te Amo' and 'Jiyen Kyun' are the frontrunners while 'Mit Jaaye Gham' holds maximum commercial prospects. This album may not be one of finest to arrive from Pritam stables but works potentially in giving thrive to flick's narration, a substantial box-office success and aggressive promotion will surely do trick in raising its business prospects."

== Controversies ==
Zeenat Aman, who starred in the original "Dum Maaro Dum" expressed her disappointment about the remixed version, citing that the original song had an innocence in Asha Bhosle's vocals and its lyrics, which was missing in the remix. She added that the remix did not live up to the musical and lyrical excellence the original version had. Bhupinder Singh, who had been known for his collaborations with R. D. Burman, also expressed his disappointment on the remixed version of "Dum Maaro Dum" adding "How can you remix Pancham's music? It was modern even 30 years ago. Why tamper with and distort someone else's tunes? [...] Apparently, Dev saab (Dev Anand) had asked them not to touch the song. What majboori (transl. helplessness) must have pushed the director and the composer to go this far? Tampering a classic disturbs the souls of those who are no more."

== Accolades ==
Award	Category	Recipient	Result	Ref.
Apsara Film & Television Producers Guild Awards	Best Playback Singer (Female)	Sunidhi Chauhan for "Te Amo"	Nominated	
International Indian Film Academy Awards	Best Playback Singer (Female)	Sunidhi Chauhan for "Te Amo"	Nominated	
