= 7 Khoon Maaf (soundtrack) =

Soundtrack album by Vishal Bhardwaj
- Released: 24 January 2011 (digital); 25 January 2011 (CD)
- Recorded: 2010–2011
- Studio: Studio Satya, Mumbai; Empire Audio Center, Mumbai; Rajiv Menon Studio, Chennai
- Genre: Original feature film soundtrack
- Length: 40:30
- Label: Sony Music Entertainment India
- Producer: Hitesh Sonik; Clinton Cerejo; Simaab Sen

Vishal Bhardwaj chronology
Ishqiya (2010)	7 Khoon Maaf (2011)	Matru Ki Bijlee Ka Mandola (2012)

7 Khoon Maaf is the soundtrack to the 2011 film of the same name directed, produced and composed by Vishal Bhardwaj starring Priyanka Chopra. The film's nine-song soundtrack featured lyrics written by Gulzar, Javed Sheikh and Ajinkya Iyer and released digitally on 24 January 2011 and in physical formats the following day. The album received positive reviews from music critics.

== Background and release ==
Vishal Bhardwaj and Gulzar worked on the film's soundtrack, post their successive decade-long collaborations, while Javed Sheikh co-wrote "Bekaraan" with Gulzar and "O' Mama" by Ajinkya Iyer. The song "Darling" is inspired by the Russian folk song "Kalinka". The track itself featured Russian words in the lyrics as in the film's context, one of Susanna's husbands was Russian. Bhardwaj brought four singers from Russia to record the vocals, and also credited the track on the album cover as well as the film. "Tere Liye", sung by Suresh Wadkar, was not used in the film. The soundtrack was digitally released via Ovi (Nokia) internet service on 24 January 2011, and via CD on 25 January 2011. Chopra and Bhardwaj launched the album at the Radio City and Radio Mirchi offices in Mumbai, where all the songs aired live on those stations during the physical release.

== Track listing ==
No.	Title	Lyrics	Singer(s)	Length
1.	"Darling"	Gulzar	Usha Uthup, Rekha Bhardwaj	3:27
2.	"Bekaraan"	Gulzar, Javed Sheikh	Vishal Bhardwaj	6:25
3.	"O' Mama"	Ajinkya Iyer	KK, Clinton Cerejo	4:53
4.	"Awaara"	Gulzar	Master Saleem	5:31
5.	"Tere Liye"	Gulzar	Suresh Wadkar	5:42
6.	"Dil Dil Hai"	Gulzar	Suraj Jagan	3:06
7.	"Yeshu"	Gulzar	Rekha Bhardwaj	6:26
8.	"Doosri Darling"	Gulzar	Usha Uthup, Rekha Bhardwaj, Clinton Cerejo, Francois Castellino	3:04
9.	"O' Mama (Acoustic)"	Ajinkya Iyer	KK	1:50

== Reception ==
The Indo-Asian News Service gave the album 3.5 stars (out of 5), described it as a "a wonderful album that is not a clone of his previous work. It exudes freshness and is worth listening." Joginder Tuteja of Bollywood Hungama rated the album a 3 (out of 5), summarising "7 Khoon Maaf is a good album with a couple of definite hits, couple of skip worthy ones and the remaining have the potential to grow." The Hindustan Times noted that the soundtrack takes the listener through a variety of moods and wrote "Bhardwaj has certainly succeeded in adding new sounds to his catalogue. He continues to evade Bollywood monotony with this soundtrack [...] an innovative effort." Vipin Nair of Music Aloud gave 8.75 (out of 10) calling it as "superb soundtrack from Vishal Bhardwaj that once again underlines his versatility". Karthik Srinivasan of Milliblog described it as "vibrant" and "delectable".

== Accolades ==
Award	Date of ceremony (Note: Date is linked to the article about the awards held that year, wherever possible.)	Category	Recipient(s) and nominee(s)	Result	Ref(s)
Filmfare Awards	29 January 2012	Best Lyricist	Gulzar (for "Darling")	Nominated	
Filmfare Awards	29 January 2012	Best Female Playback Singer	Rekha Bhardwaj and Usha Uthup (for "Darling")	Won	
Global Indian Music Academy Awards	1 October 2012	Best Lyricist	Gulzar (for "Darling")	Nominated	
Global Indian Music Academy Awards	1 October 2012	Best Female Playback Singer	Rekha Bhardwaj and Usha Uthup (for "Darling")	Nominated	
International Indian Film Academy Awards	9 June 2012	Best Music Director	Vishal Bharadwaj	Nominated	
International Indian Film Academy Awards	9 June 2012	Best Lyricist	Gulzar (for song "Darling")	Nominated	
International Indian Film Academy Awards	9 June 2012	Best Playback Singer – Female	Rekha Bhardwaj and Usha Uthup (for "Darling")	Nominated	
Mirchi Music Awards	21 March 2012	Female Vocalist of The Year	Rekha Bhardwaj and Usha Uthup (for "Darling")	Nominated	
Mirchi Music Awards	21 March 2012	Best Song Recording	"Awaara"	Nominated	
Producers Guild Film Awards (Note: Also known as Apsara Film & Television Producers Guild Award.)	25 January 2012	Best Lyricist	Gulzar	Nominated	
Screen Awards	15 January 2012	Best Female Playback Singer	Rekha Bhardwaj and Usha Uthup (for "Darling")	Nominated	
Screen Awards	15 January 2012	Best Choreography	Sandeep Suparkar (for "Darling")	Nominated	
