= Infestdead Records =

Indian record label

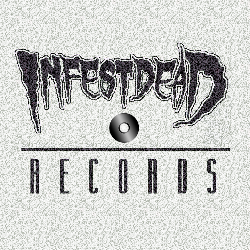
- Founded: 2012
- Founder: Rik Namchoom
- Status: active
- Genre: Heavy metal
- Country of origin: India
- Location: Shillong / New Delhi, India

Infestdead Records is an independent record label from India, and the first metal record label from Northeast India. The label was founded in 2012 by Rik Namchoom of Unholy Maunder.

== Music ==
The label distributed Sons of Malice (2012) by the British NWOBHM band Savage, in India.

== Album ==
- Sons of Malice (2012) – Savage

== Current personnel ==
- Producer – Rik Namchoom
- Co-producer and sound engineer – Dika Rante
- AR – Aditya Jarial
- Assistant AR – Kallol Bordoloi
- PR Manager – Chintan Zalani

(Last updated: August 2012)
