= Antariksh =

- Origin: New Delhi, Delhi, India
- Genres: Progressive rock; Pop; Hindi rock
- Years active: 2012–present

Antariksh is an Indian pop and progressive rock band with Hindustani classical elements, founded and fronted by guitar player, singer and producer, Varun Rajput. The band is known for the song "Quest" featuring former Megadeth guitarist Marty Friedman. Based in New Delhi, their name roughly translates to "The Cosmos."

== History ==
=== Early years ===
From 2006 to 2008, during their college days, Varun Rajput and Mridul Ganesh played in a local Progressive Rock band called Feedback, with Gurtej Singh playing for Prestorika around the same time. A few years later, both Mridul and Varun decided to quit their management consulting jobs around the same time in 2012 to work on more creative projects. During this time Varun and Gurtej had also been having conversations about starting a new project and were wanting to get back to music. The three of them then decided to get together and formally founded the band in 2012.

They released their first song, ‘Dheere Dheere’ in January 2013. This propelled the trio to record a full-length album and find a drummer and a bass player to begin playing live. To fill the role, they found Vipul Malhotra. Vipul was studying at NSIT at the time and was fit for the group. Finally, Varun asked his friend Raghav Verma to join the team.

With the group finally complete, they recorded and produced an album during the summer of 2013 for their new band ‘Antariksh’.

=== Debut album, 2013 ===
After one year of the band coming together they released their debut album, titled Khoj, on 8 September 2013. The album was a blend of pop, rock, funk, and progressive sounds, featuring 11 tracks, mixed at the Quarter Note Studio by Gaurav Chintamani, and mastered by Steve Nagasaki at Nagasaki Sound, USA. It included the song "Tum," a collaboration with guitarist Baiju Dharmajan.

In November 2015, they were featured on Season 4 of Music Mojo, a popular music show on Kappa TV which features live renditions of 11 songs performed by the band.

=== 2018–2024: Quest ===
In 2018, Antariksh released their single ‘Kaahe Re’ in association with Mrrcury Studios and Anhad Music. Kaahe Re has received praise for its rhythmic syncopation, melodic prowess and anthem riffs.

In 2019, Antariksh performed at the 10th edition of the Bacardi NH7 Weekender in Meghalaya.

In 2024, they released their second album Quest, which includes 'Kaahe Re' and a title song featuring Marty Friedman.

=== 2025–present ===
In late 2025, Antariksh dropped "Udaan," a single from their upcoming album Rehguzar. In 2026, they released another single for the album, 'Naaqis' featuring Polish guitarist Jakub Zytecki. Rehguzar is a 12-track concept album that takes its name from an Urdu word meaning 'the path one walks.'

== International presence ==
In October 2019, Antariksh went on its first international multi-city tour of Mauritius and Madagascar. They played at various venues in Mauritius, which included the Indira Gandhi Centre for Indian Culture, Centre de Flacq and Triolet. In Madagascar they performed for Indian audiences at an event organized by the embassy of India in the Ampefiloha Plaza in Antananarivo, the capital of Madagascar.

In September 2025, Antariksh went on a 3 city tour of the USA, performing a total of 6 concerts in Seattle, Houston and Dallas, drawing participation from the Indian-American diaspora and the wider community.

== Discography ==
=== Albums ===
- Khoj (2013)
- Quest (2024)

Singles

- "Dastan-E-Dil (Shine Your Light)" (2023)
- "Tasveerein" (2024)
- "Karwaan" (2024)
- "Sabki Kahani" (2025)
- "Udaan" (2025)
- "Naaqis" (2026)
- "Aashayein" (Live) (2020)
