= Kapil Srivastava =

Indian guitarist

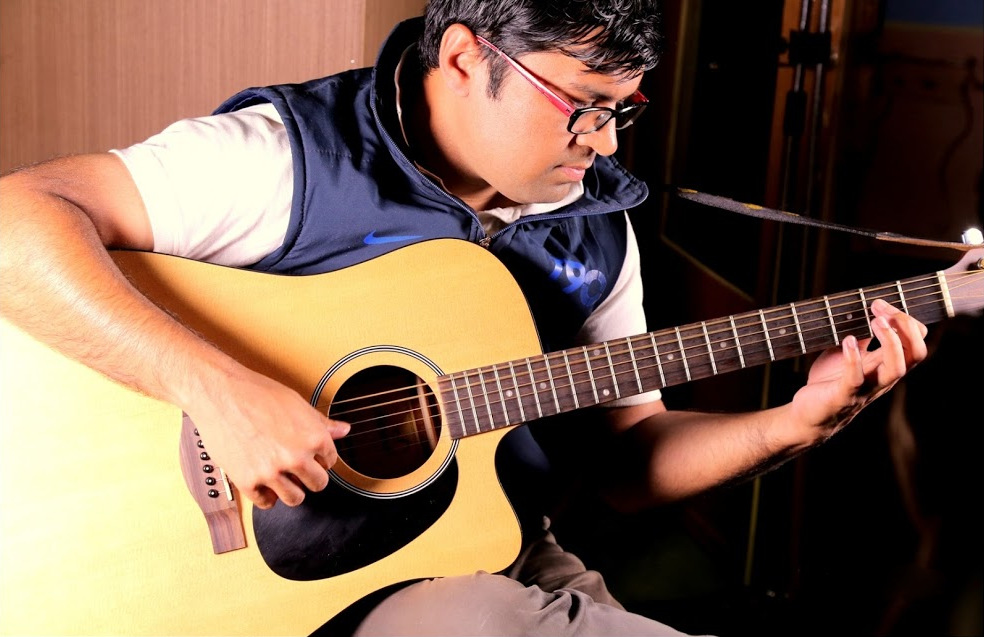
- During the Video shoot of a Song at a studio in Delhi, India.

Background information
- Born: 23 June; Delhi, India
- Occupations: Guitarist, composer, author
- Instrument: Guitar
- Website: www.guitarmonk.com www.kapilsrivastava.com

Kapil Srivastava (born 23 June) is an Indian guitarist, music author, composer, and trainer from New Delhi. He completed his education at DAV Public School and then earned a degree in commerce from the University of Delhi. He started his career as a guitarist in 1996 and has worked for various record labels, including Saregama.

In 2005, Srivastava founded Guitarmonk, an organisation focused on guitar instruction, live performance, and related musical services.

Srivastava developed an interest in music and allied arts when he was 10 years old. His interests include music composition, authoring, music education, and live guitar concerts. He has written several instructional books on the guitar, including Rudiments of Guitar and Mastery to Guitar Scales Vol. 1 and Vol. 2. He has also produced instrumental guitar albums, such as Indian Guitaroo Vol. 1 and Vol. 2.

Srivastava and his team conduct corporate training. He also advises schools on integrating music programs into standard curricula.

== Compositions ==
Kapil Srivastava has composed several guitar compositions. Among them he also improvised India's fastest Bollywood guitar piece Neele Neele Ambar Par, Chura Liya hai tumne on guitar etc. He also composed music, The Journey, for a Bollywood movie Dubai Returns. Guitar duet release with Grammy Winner Vishwa Mohan Bhatt in the year 2016 for the composition Merry Love Rain.
