= All the Fat Children =

Bangalore-based alternative rock band

All The Fat Children
- Origin: Bangalore, Karnataka, India
- Genres: Hard rock, Alternative rock
- Years active: 2008 – present
- Label: Unsigned
- Members: Eben Johnson; Vickram Kiran; Sachin Savio Dane
- Past members: Samuel Santosh Wesley

All The Fat Children (ATFC) is a Bengaluru-based alternative rock band that was formed in June 2008.

== Career ==
ATFC has its roots as a college band from Christ University. The three members met up at university while studying and decided to form the band. The name origin came from Eben Johnson, who said "When we started off, sometime in 2008, we all were chubby kids. Most of our material came from the fact that we were overweight." The band had performed in Bangalore with Motherjane and Pentagram. They have performed more than 200 shows so far with 30 original compositions to their credit.

ATFC released their first single called "I Can Fly", which was also released as a video produced by Qyuki, an initiative by A.R. Rehman and Shekhar Kapur.

A second single "Somebody Else" was released in 2015, also released as a self-produced video. The video also received air time on TV channels such as VH1 and Pepsi MTV Indies. The video was shot in a warehouse, which was painted and the process took less than twenty four hours. "Somebody Else" was selected by Rolling Stone India as one of its 10 Best Indian Singles of 2015. Sennheiser listed ATFC in the top twenty bands in India for 2016 and 2017.

The band does not believe in producing an album as yet, preferring to produce singles and videos to accompany them. "We realised one thing over the years. People expect us to have an album around. We don’t have one. We have never supported the idea of an album. I have personally bought only two albums in my life. I never saw the point in it. The idea of a single was good. Now we are thinking of doing an EP just for the people who know our songs, want to listen to them together and hear a lot more of us". says Eben, the vocalist and guitarist. The band is known for their live act including instances of Eben wearing a nightgown with lipstick and a bindi.

The band completed a decade of performance in 2018.
