= Brown Indian Band =

The Brown Indian Band
- Origin: India
- Genres: Jazz
- Members: Colin D'Cruz
- Website: Click here

The Brown Indian Band was formed by bass player Colin D'Cruz and features accomplished Indian classical musicians, in concert with jazz musicians.

== Overview ==
Indian classical is similar to jazz as they are both forms of improvised music. Whereas Indian classical is linear and uses just one scale (rāga) to improvise within a composition, jazz has a much broader palette for musical improvisation, where multiple scales can be used to improvise through complex harmonies. Indian classical music, however, has some of the world's most complex rhythm structures and subtle quarter tones that takes its sound far beyond the realms of the twelve tone scale.

The Brown Indian Band uses the best of both styles of musical improvisation to create a very funky sound of world music. The band has floating personnel that very often features visiting international jazz artists.
