= Dum Maro Dum (song) =

Song by Asha Bhosle and Chorus
- Released: 1971
- Recorded: Mumbai, 1971
- Length: 1:50
- Label: Saregama India Ltd.
- Composer: Rahul Dev Burman
- Lyricist: Anand Bakshi

Dum Maro Dum (lit. 'Puff, take a puff') is an Indian Hindi-language song from the 1971 Bollywood film Hare Rama Hare Krishna. It was sung by Asha Bhosle, written by Anand Bakshi and composed by Rahul Dev Burman. In the film, it is picturized on Zeenat Aman.

The song became very successful in India in the 1970s. It has since been remixed and sampled by many other artists.

== Personnel ==
The song was originally intended to be a duet, with Lata Mangeshkar singing for the "good girl", and Usha Iyer (later Usha Uthup) singing for the "bad girl". However, due to some changes, the song ended up being a solo sung by Asha Bhosle. The sound aa..aa..aa.. at the end of each stanza is that of Usha Iyer, who also chants Hare Krishna Hare Rama with the chorus.

The song presented the lyricist Anand Bakshi as a versatile lyricist and shaped his career. It also boosted the composer Rahul Dev Burman's career. Bhupinder played the guitar for the song. Charanjit Singh played the distinctive drone of the transichord that opens the song.

== Charts and reviews ==
The song topped the Binaca Geetmala Annual List 1972. In Binaca Geetmala, a song could appear for a maximum of 18 weeks, after which it was called a Sartaj Geet. On 15 March 1972, Dum Maro Dum became a Sartaj Geet while it was at #1 payddan (position). It had remained at #1 position for 12 weeks.

Daniel Shiman, a reviewer wrote about the song, "It's a montage of creaking synthesizers, psychedelic guitars, and, of course, vocals nailed by Asha Bhosle in an ear-piercing exposition of sound." Kishore Kumar once said that the song is powerful enough to bring a dead person to life.

== Picturization ==
The film and the song were shot in Kathmandu. It shows Janice (Zeenat Aman) in her hippie attire, smoking cannabis or hashish and swaying under the effect of the herbs while hypnotically crooning the "Dum Maro Dum", encouraging one to 'take another toke'. She dances with a look of ecstasy on her face.

Later in the film, Dev Anand replies to the song by singing "Ram Ka Naam Badnaam Na Karo" (lit. 'Do not desecrate the name of Rama'), sung by Kishore Kumar.

== Other versions ==
The song has been remixed and sampled by a number of artists. It has also been included in many compilations. Dev Anand did not include the complete version of "Dum Maro Dum" in the film, as he was worried the song would overshadow it.

Usha Uthup (who sang the song "I Love You" with Asha Bhosle in the film) has performed the song many times. British DJ, San-j Sanj has used the guitar hook and created a dance track featuring Natty A, called "So Real So Right". DJ Ritu and Bally Sagoo compiled the song for their collection The Rough Guide to Bollywood in 2002. In 2004, the hip-hop artist Method Man sampled the song in his third album Tical 0: The Prequel, for the track "What's Happenin'" featuring Busta Rhymes.

The song was re-recorded for the album You've Stolen My Heart (2005) by Kronos Quartet and Asha Bhosle. The album was a tribute to Rahul Dev Burman. The song was also featured in the soundtrack to the 2005 video game Grand Theft Auto: Liberty City Stories.

"Dum Maro Dum" has been covered by soul funk band Botown on the album The Soul of Bollywood. Like the original, Botown's version was recorded completely live. It builds on the original's psychedelic soul leanings with a hypnotic laid-back groove. The song has also been covered by Indian film enthusiasts The Knockouts, from Luton, England, on their 4-track EP, The Remarkable Sounds of India. The Knockouts, who usually record lo-fi garage punk/surf instrumentals, have, for this release only, engaged the services of fellow Asha Bhosle fan, Mick Sheridan, who lived for several years in India.

It was featured in the 2003 Bollywood film Boom, where Zeenat Aman once again sings and dances to the song. It has also been remixed as an item song and picturized on Deepika Padukone in the 2011 Bollywood film Dum Maaro Dum. It has also been featured as a background track in other Indian films such as KGF: Chapter 1 (2018) and Dhurandhar (2025).

It was sampled for the rap song "Work All Day" by Footsie, which was used in the iPhone 13 launch video in 2021.

== Awards ==
- Filmfare Best Female Playback Award (Asha Bhosle)

== See also ==
- Gita Mehta’s book Karma Cola (story "Karma Crackers")
