= Baiju Dharmajan =

Indian musician (born 1968)

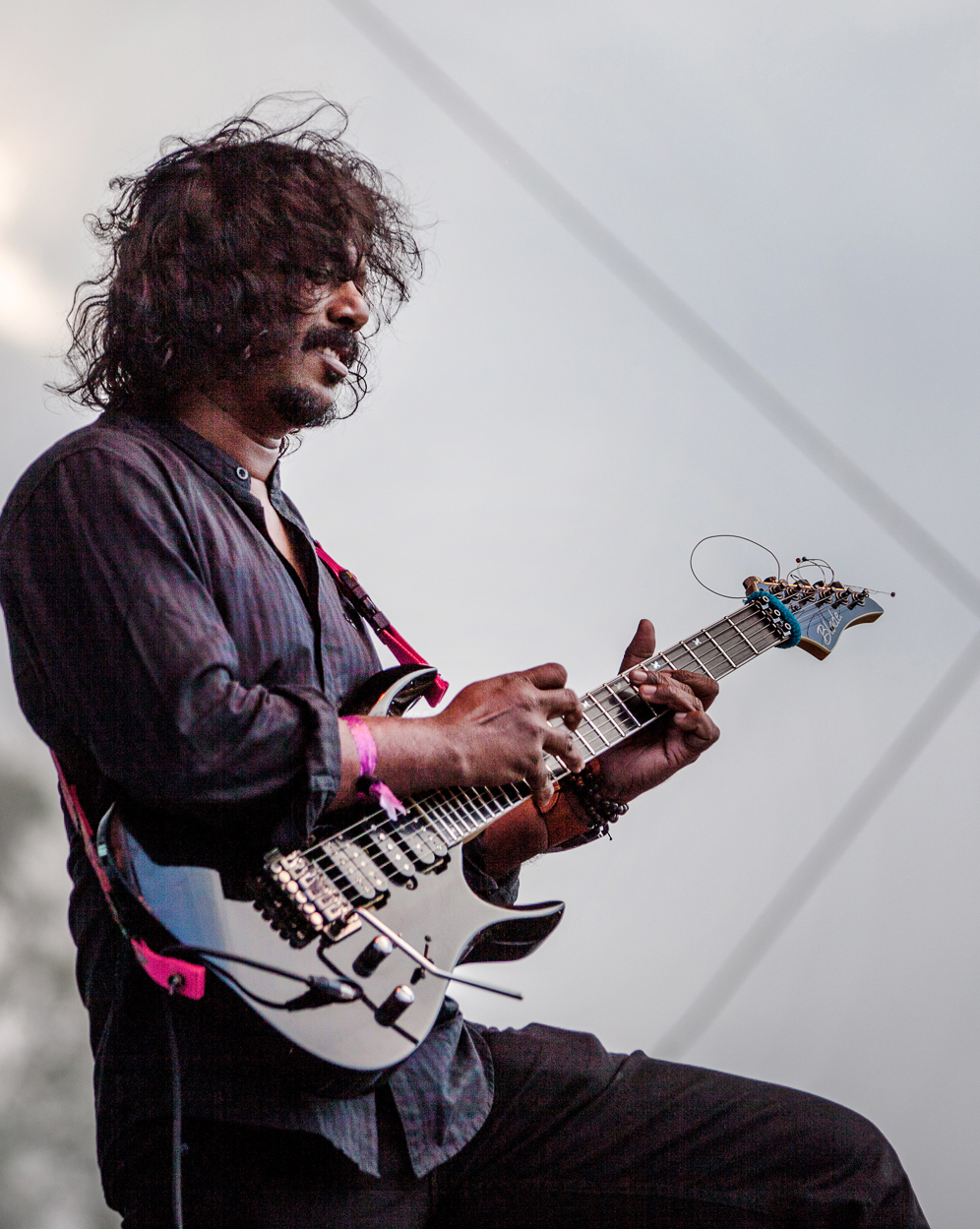
- Baiju performing at NH7 Weekender in 2013

Background information
- Born: Baiju M Dharmajan; 7 March 1968 (age 58); Vypin, Kerala, India
- Genres: Carnatic music; Progressive Rock; Rock
- Occupations: Guitarist; Musician; Composer; Music Director; Producer
- Instruments: Guitars; vocals
- Years active: 1980–present

Baiju Dharmajan (born 7 March 1968) is an Indian guitarist, music composer, producer and guitar tutor based out of Kochi, Kerala. A celebrated musician in his own country, Baiju had an extended stint during the 2000s as the lead guitarist of the Indian rock band Motherjane. He has been nicknamed the "God of Small Strings" by his fans. Baiju is particularly noted for his winding, Carnatic-inspired progressive rock and enduring guitar solos.

== See also ==
Paras Thakur

== Biography ==
Born in Vypin Islands (near Cochin, India) to Thankamani and Dharmajan, Baiju started his musical career at the age of 14. He began with Carnatic violin but then slowly shifted to the guitar. His father used to play the Hawaiian guitar and his grandfather was a Carnatic musician. His first role as a performer began at the age of 5 as a guitar player in a traveling troop of musicians, giving him the opportunity to play with legendary Malayalam singer Yesudas.

After relocating to his hometown in Vypin in the 90's, he started playing in a band called Instinct, followed by short stints with the bands Wrenz and Aatma. During one of the practice sessions of the band Aatma, he met John of Motherjane, who then invited him to audition for the lead guitarist position in the band.

He has cited his influences as Jimi Hendrix, Jimmy Page, Jeff Beck, Steve Vai, Joe Satriani, Reb Beach, Brian May and John Anthony.

Baiju is also a big fan of Illayaraja and loves the compositions of other Indian composers like Raveendran, Devarajan, Naushad and R.D. Burman. His father had a vast collection of ghazals by Mehdi Hassan, Anup Jalota, and Pankaj Udhas and he grew up listening to Malayalam, Tamil and Hindi film music.

His favourite guitarists include Jimi Hendrix, Jimmy Page, Steve Vai, John Anthony, Mattias Ekhlund and Guthrie Govan.

== Motherjane era ==
Baiju was the lead guitarist for Motherjane from 1999 through 2010, during which the band released two full-length albums– 'Insane Biography' in 2003 and 'Maktub' in 2008. The band was a popular live act in India in the 2000s and played at many festivals. Baiju has a major influence of the Carnatic musical style in his guitar riffs and solos. The other songs on the album Maktub are audibly influenced by Carnatic elements as well. Songs such as Mindstreet and Fields of Sound firmly describe Baiju's tonality.

== Collaborations and solo projects ==
Since 2010, Baiju has been working on collaborations and solo projects. He released his debut solo album titled 'The Crossover' in 2012 under the record label Cochym. Baiju's also contributed towards producing an EP for Kochi-based band 'Kaav'. He's released Indian rock versions of patriotic songs Mile Sur Mera Tumhara, Vande Mataram and the national anthem of India, Jana Gana Mana.

Baiju's been a part of 'Kashmir' with Sanjeev Thomas, 'Karnatrix' with John Antony and 'Bluefire' with classical violinist Harikumar Sivan. Baiju also co-created "Sacred Science" for the popular TV Series The Dewarists with percussionist cum composer Karsh Kale and edakka drum teacher Harigovindan. Other collaborations include Sanjay Maroo, Naresh Iyer, Keith Peters, Ustad Asad Khan, Uday Jose, David Joseph, Midival Punditz and Susmit Sen. In 2013, he accompanied British "shred-king" Andy James for a workshop in Kolkata. In July 2014, his single 'Moham' was published by Songdew.

== Discography ==
=== Studio albums ===
- Insane Biography with Motherjane – 2003
- Maktub with Motherjane – 2008
- By the Moonlight – Wrenz United – 2011
- The Crossover – Baiju Dharmajan Solo – 2012

=== Singles ===
- Jana Gana Mana – Baiju Dharmajan – 2011
- Vande Mataram – Baiju Dharmajan – 2011
- Mile Sur Mera Tumhara – Baiju Dharmajan – 2013
- Vaishnava Janato – Baiju Dharmajan – 2013
- Moham – Baiju Dharmajan – 2014

=== Guest appearances ===
- Tum - Antariksh ft. Baiju Dharmajan - Khoj, 2013

=== Feature Film Soundtracks ===
- Dayom Panthrandum - 2013

=== Production discography ===
- Kaav E.P – KAAV – 2010
