= Botown =

London-based multicultural soul band

Botown is a London-based multicultural soul band formed by musician, songwriter and producer Ajay Srivastav. It takes its name from the short form of 'Bollywood Town', itself a tribute to the classic Soul music record label Motown which is short for Motor Town.

== Music ==
The music of Botown blends the genres of Bollywood with classic Soul and Funk from the 1960s and 1970s. It is a musical reimagining of the Bollywood genre and references artists such as Ray Charles, James Brown and Sly and the Family Stone together with Bollywood Music Directors such as RD Burman, Laxmikant Pyarelal and Kalyanji Anandji. As well as Soul music, the band also draws inspiration from gospel, funk, jazz, Blues and reggae. Along with these musical influences Botown also add their original music and compositions. The band creates a musical link between what Srivastav calls the "working class music of India and America."

== The band ==
Botown is made up of many well known London based musicians all of whom are trained in various styles. The band was created and developed by Ajay Srivastav in late 2008 with the ethos of keeping music live and real. To this end the band is passionate about playing live and concerts include freeform and improvised sections with extended and sometimes spontaneous solo sections. Botown concerts are also well known for audience participation where fans sing and dance along with the band. Their first official public performance was in early 2009, though there were some 'warm up' shows in late 2008. The initial launch-shows were at the Watermans Arts Centre a venue well established in the UK Asian Arts scene. The concerts were a huge success and soon the band were regularly selling out venues such as Rich Mix, The Drum and the Broadway Barking. In the Summer of 2009, the band headlined at the Southampton Music festival and in August 2009 the band made history by being the first band to showcase Bollywood music at London's legendary Jazz Cafe. In 2010 the band headlined at the GLA Diwali in the Square Festival at Trafalgar Square in Central London and played to a crowd of 30,000 fans.

In the Autumn of 2010 Botown released their debut single: Roop Tera, which was a Ray Charles inspired reworking of a Bollywood classic from the 1969 film Aradhana. The single hit the number one spot in the Official Asian Download Charts as played on the BBC Asian Network. The track combines Ray Charles inspired Gospel/Blues hooks with the SD Burman classic from the Bollywood film Aradhana.

The critically acclaimed debut album the Soul of Bollywood was released in Winter 2010 and climbed the Amazon Funk Charts going top 10. It was the only Asian album to be given mainstream distribution through HMV shops in the UK that year and received a number of positive mainstream reviews including The Evening Standard and The Daily Express.

In February 2011 Botown were nominated for a Lebara Mobile UK Asian Music Award in the category of 'Best Alternative Act'.

In December 2011, Botown were given the Best Band of 2011 Award by Eastern Eye Newspaper.

Songs from Botown's debut album 'The Soul of Bollywood' have featured a number of times on the UK's leading soap opera EastEnders on BBC1. Dum Maro Dum was featured in the episode broadcast on 8 March 2011, Churaliya on 24 March 2011 and Chaiyya Chaiyya was featured in a scene broadcast on 9 May 2011.

== Performances ==
Nov 2008: Walthemstow Town Hall

15 May 2009: Watermans

16 May 2009: Watermans

18 July 2009 Southampton Festival

21 Aug 2009 Jazz Cafe

2 Oct 2009: Barking Broadway

7 Nov 2009: Watermans

18 Dec 2009: Rich Mix

19 Dec 2009 Rich Mix

11 Mar 2010: Jazz Cafe

30 Oct 2010 Watermans

31 Oct 2010 Trafalgar Square

27 Nov 2010: Jazz Cafe

4 Dec 2010: The Drum

12 Feb 2011: Watermans

22 Feb 2011: Downstairs at Momo's

5 Mar 2011: Broadway Barking

2 May 2011: Chesterfield

4 Jun 2011: Barnet Arts Depot

3 July 2011: Harrow Arts Centre

10 July 2011: Leicester Belgrave Mela

10 July 2011: Cambridge in the City Festival (Main Stage)

23 July 2011: Rich Mix (as part of BBC London 94.9 FM live broadcast)

15 Oct 2011: Granville Theatre, Ramsgate

29 Oct 2011: The Grove Theatre, Dunstable

11 Nov 2011: The Beck Theatre, Hayes

21 Nov 2011: Fairfield Halls, Croydon

25 Nov 2011: Woodville Halls, Gravesend

31 Dec 2011: Cardiff New Year Celebrations (main stage)

17 Feb 2012: The Stables, Milton Keynes

18 Mar 2012: Theatre Royal, Windsor

30 Mar 2012: Asian Business Awards, London

13 May 2012: Kenneth More Theatre, Ilford

20 May 2012: Creeksea

3 Jun 2012: Rose Theatre, Kingston

29 Jun 2012: Altricham

7 July 2012: Richmond

4 Aug 2012: Riverside Festival, Nottingham

5 Aug 2012: Leicester

11 Aug 2012: Darlington

23rd Sept 2012: Four Seasons, London

5 Oct 2012: Beck Theatre, Hayes

7 Oct 2012: Fairfield Halls, Croydon

27 Oct 2012: Mottram

== Discography ==
Roop Tera (Single) (p) 2010 Scion records

The Soul of Bollywood (Album) (p) 2010 Scion Records

The Big B Shuffle (Single) (p) & (c) 2012 Scion Records
