= Usha Uthup =

Indian singer & actress (born 1947)

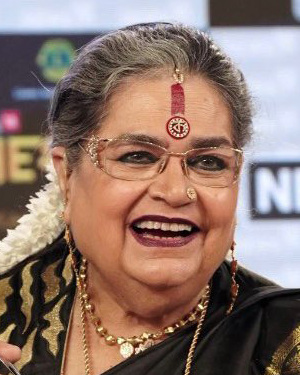
- Usha Uthup, c. 2024

Background information
- Also known as: Didi
- Born: Usha Iyer; 8 November 1947 (age 78); Bombay, Bombay State, Dominion of India (present day Mumbai, Maharashtra, India)
- Genres: Indian pop, filmi, jazz, R&B, Indian classical music, Western
- Occupations: Playback singer; actress
- Instrument: Vocalist
- Years active: 1966 – present
- Awards: Padma Shri (2011); Padma Bhushan (2024)

Usha Iyer Uthup (born 8 November 1947) is an Indian singer known for her deep contralto voice and her versatility across genres and languages. A prominent figure in Indian music since the 1970s, she has received a Filmfare Award, and was honoured by the Government of India with the Padma Shri in 2011 and the Padma Bhushan in 2024 for her contribution in the field of arts.

== Personal life ==
Usha was born on 8 November 1947 into a Tamil family in Mumbai. Her father was Vaidyanath Someshwar Sami Iyer.

She studied at St. Agnes High School, Byculla. When she was in school she was thrown out of music class because she didn't fit in with a voice like hers. But her music teacher recognized that she had some music in her and would give her clappers or triangles to play. Even though she was not formally trained in music, she grew up in an atmosphere of music. Her parents used to listen to a wide range from Western classical to Hindustani and Carnatic including Kishori Amonkar and Bade Ghulam Ali Khan on radio and she used to join them. She used to enjoy listening to Radio Ceylon.

Her next door neighbor was S.M.A. Pathan, who was then the deputy commissioner of police. His daughter, Jamila, influenced Usha to learn Hindi and take up Indian classical music. This fusion approach helped her to pioneer her unique brand of Indian pop in the 1970s.

She was married to Jani Chacko Uthup who hailed from the Manarcaud Painumkal family of Kottayam. They have a daughter Anjali and a son Sunny, named after the song, "Sunny". Her husband, Jani Chacko, died due to a cardiac arrest on 8 July 2024.

== Career ==
Usha Uthup's first public singing occurred when she was nine. Her sisters, who were already exploring a career in music, introduced her to Ameen Sayani, then the most popular radio announcer in India. Ameen Sayani gave her an opportunity to sing in the Ovaltine Music Hour of Radio Ceylon. She sang a number called "Mockingbird Hill". After that, several appearances followed through her teenage years.

=== Singing career ===
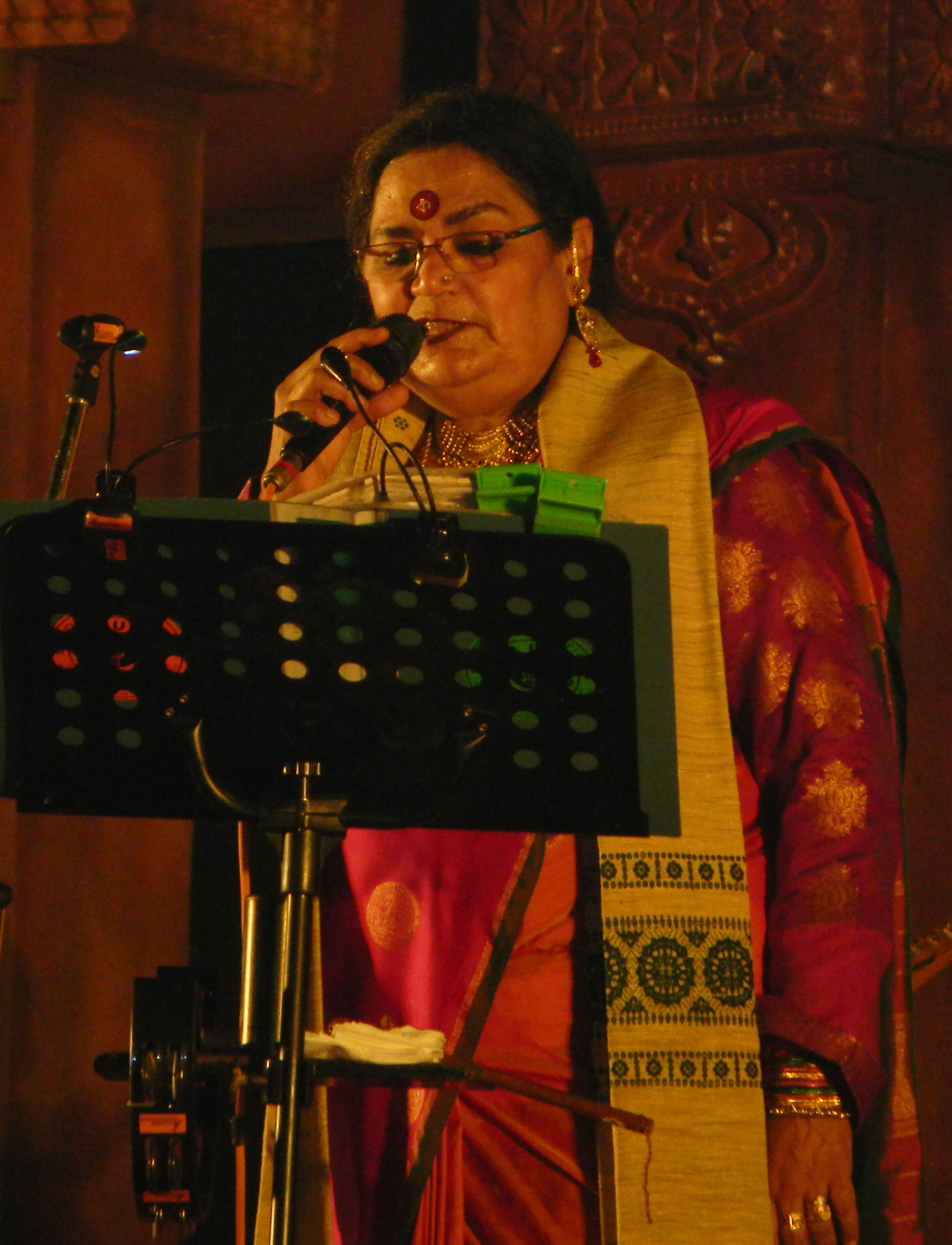
Uthup during a performance, c. 2012

Uthup started her music career in Chennai in 1969, singing in a small nightclub called Nine Gems in the basement of the erstwhile Safire Theatre complex on Mount Road, wearing a saree and leg calipers. Her performance was so well received that the owner of the nightclub asked her to stay on for a week. After her first night club gig, she began singing in Calcutta at night clubs such as Trincas. She met her future husband, Jani Chacko Uthup, in Trincas . At about the same time, she also sang at "Talk of the Town", now known as "Not Just Jazz by the Bay" in Bombay (now Mumbai). After Trincas, her next engagement took her to Delhi where she sang at the Oberoi hotels. By happenstance, a film crew belonging to Navketan unit and Dev Anand visited the nightclub and they offered her a chance to sing movie playback. As a result, she started her Bollywood career with Ivory-Merchant's Bombay Talkie (1970) in which she sang an English number under Shankar-Jaikishan and subsequently also sang for the soundtrack for the film Hare Rama Hare Krishna (1971). Originally, she was supposed to sing "Dum Maro Dum" along with Asha Bhosle for Hare Rama Hare Krishna. However, as a result of internal politics on the part of other singers, she lost that chance but ended up singing an English verse.

In 1968, she recorded covers of two pop songs in English, "Jambalaya" and The Kingston Trio's "Greenback Dollar", on an EP, Love Story, and "Scotch and Soda", another Kingston Trio song, which sold very well in the Indian market. She also spent some time in London during this early period. She was a frequent visitor to Vernon Corea's BBC office at the Langham in London and was interviewed on London Sounds Eastern on BBC Radio London. Usha visited Nairobi as part of an Indian festival. She was so popular that she was invited to stay on. Singing and quite often nationalistic songs in Swahili made her extremely popular and the then President Jomo Kenyatta made her an Honorary Citizen of Kenya. She sang the famous song "Malaika" ('Angel') with Fadhili Williams who was the original singer. She produced a record "Live in Nairobi" with a local band Fellini Five.

Uthup sang several songs in the 1970s and 1980s for music directors R. D. Burman and Bappi Lahiri. She also reprised some of R. D. Burman songs that were sung by others such as "Mehbooba Mehbooba" and "Dum Maro Dum" and popularised them to a distinct end.

Uthup also sang for a two-volume collection of children's rhymes "Karadi Rhymes", which are "Indian Rhymes for Indian Kids", brought out by Karadi Tales (www.karaditales.com). The rhymes reflect the Indian ethos through the Sa-re-ga-ma, mangoes, Indian rivers, the train experiences, Indian festivals, indigenous trees, Cricket, Indian foods like bhelpuri and sambhar, Indian attire like the dhoti, sari, bindi and bangles and even some folk tales. With each rhyme set to an Indian raga, and sung in her characteristic voice with a feisty tempo, Usha creates the atmosphere for children and, surprisingly, even adults to sing along and dance to the toe-tapping beats.

She appeared as a judge on the second season of the singing reality show Bharat Ki Shaan: Singing Star (2012), aired on DD National channel, along with Ismail Darbar. She returned as the judge for the next season of the show as well. She also appeared as a chief guest for Marathi singing reality show. She entertained the audience with Marathi songs. She was also a judge in the first season of Star Vijay's Airtel Super Singer Junior and Airtel Super Singer 5. She appeared on The Kapil Sharma Show on 26 May 2019.

She is a stage performer and gives performances all over the world and is known for her lively stage presence. Uthup has been felicitated with several awards over the years, some of which include Rajiv Gandhi Purashkar for National Integration for quality music, Mahila Shiromani Puraskar for International Peace, and Channel V Award for Outstanding Achievement.

She recorded her first album with Luis Banks for which she was paid Rs. 3500. Since then, she has recorded numerous albums. Usha's Hindi version of Michael Jackson's "Don't Stop 'Til You Get Enough", titled "Chhupke Kaon Aya", can be found on the album Tom Middleton – The Trip (2004). A cover of Gloria Gaynor's "I Will Survive" is on another Tom Middleton album, Cosmosonica – Tom Middleton Presents Crazy Covers Vol. 1 (2005). She recorded a song called "Rhythm and Blues" with the Indian rock band Parikrama which appeared on Channel V on 23 April 2007. Uthup received a lot of recognition for having a unique voice that ranges between contralto and alto.

=== Acting career ===
Uthup is also an actress. In 2006, she acted in the Malayalam movie Pothan Vava as Kurisuveettil Mariamma.

She made a cameo appearance in the movie Bombay To Goa. In 2007, she appeared in Bow Barracks Forever directed by Anjun Dutt as herself. Again in 2007, she appeared in Hattrick music video as herself.

She appeared in disguise on Indian Idol 1 and 2. She was one of the co-judges of the 2007 and 2008 and Idea Star Singer Season V (2010).

She has a minor role in the 2010 Tamil movie Manmadan Ambu.

She acted in Vishal Bhardwaj's 7 Khoon Maaf as a maid. She also sung a song in the film, "Darling", which released on 18 February 2011. In 2012, she has starred in a Kannada film Parie.

In 2019, she appeared in the documentary If Not for You for which, she recorded a cover of "Blowin' in the Wind" by legendary singer-songwriter Bob Dylan.

== Discography ==
Year	Song	Film	Composer	Language
1970	"Jogan Pritam Ki"	Devi	Laxmikant Pyarelal	Hindi
1971	"Mai bhi jaloon tu bhi jale"	Kabhi Dhoop Kabhi Chhaon	Chitragupta	Hindi
1971	"Hare Rama Hare Krishna"	Hare Rama Hare Krishna	R D Burman	Hindi
1974	"I am in love"	Kanyakumari	M B Sreenivasan	Malayalam
1974	"Love Is Just Around The Corner"	Chattakkari	G. Devarajan	Malayalam
1975	"Love is beautiful"	Melnaattu Marumagal	Kunnakudi Vaidyanathan	Tamil
1975	"Hello Lover"	Idhayakkani	M.S.Viswanathan	Tamil
1976	"It's Easy To Fool You"	Oorukku Uzhaippavan	M.S.Viswanathan	Tamil
1977	"How Can I Tell You"	Sangharsha	Vijaya Bhaskar	Kannada
1977	"We Have Got"	Sangharsha	Vijaya Bhaskar	Kannada
1977	"Peethambara O Krishna"	Sivathandavam (album)		Malayalam
1978	"Where there is"	Randu Penkuttikal	M S Vishwanathan	Malayalam
1978	"One Two Cha Cha Cha"	Shalimar	R D Burman	Hindi
1980	"Doston Se Pyar Kiya"	Shaan	R D Burman	Hindi
1980	"Shaan Se..."	Shaan	R D Burman	Hindi
1980	"Hari Om Hari"	Pyaara Dushman	Bappi Lahiri	Hindi
1981	"Ramba"	Armaan	Bappi Lahiri	Hindi
1981	"Tu Mujhe Jaan Se Bhi Pyara Hai"	Wardat	Bappi Lahiri	Hindi
1982	"Koi Yahan Aha Nache Nache"	Disco Dancer	Bappi Lahiri	Hindi
1984	"Oh my darling"	Oru Sumangaliyude Kadha	Herself	Malayalam
1984	"Hey Diwana"	Kaveri		Odia
1988	"Sidhartha"	Sidhartha	Shyam	Malayalam
1988	"Akka Alla Tangi Alla"	Vijaya Khadga	Hamsalekha	Kannada
1990	"Naaka Bandi"	Naaka Bandi	Bappi Lahiri	Hindi
1991	"Uri Uri Baba"	Dushman Devta	Bappi Lahiri	Hindi
1991	"Vegam Vegam Pogum Pogum"	Anjali	Ilaiyaraaja	Tamil
1991	"Keechurallu"	Keechurallu	Ilaiyaraaja	Telugu
1993	"Chalo Chalk"	Janam	S P Venkatesh	Malayalam
1994	"Njanee Rathriye"	Daivathinte Vikrithikal	L Vaidyanathan	Malayalam
1994	"Nanthyar Vilakkum"	Daivathinte Vikrithikal	Mohan Sithara	Malayalam
1994	"Mafia"	Mafia	Anand–Milind	Malayalam
1995	"Jinka Ninja"	Kalamasseriyil Kalyaanayogam	Tomin Thankachari	Malayalam
1996	"Ladies college campusil"	Mazhayethum Munpe	R Anand	Malayalam
1997	"Daud"	Daud	A. R. Rahman	Hindi
1999	"Raja Ki Kahani"	Godmother	Vishal Bhardwaj	Hindi
1999	"Abbabboo Premsite Em Sukhamo"	Mechanic Mavayya	M. M. Keeravani	Telugu
2000	"Melam Lotto"	Rapid Action Force	Sailesh	Malayalam
2000	"Manasilore"	Rapid Action Force	Sailesh	Malayalam
2001	"Vande Mataram"	Kabhi Khushi Kabhie Gham	Jatin–Lalit, Sandesh Shandilya, Aadesh Shrivastav	Hindi
2003	"Kabhi Pa Liya Tho Kabhi Kho Diya"	Jogger's Park	Tabun	Hindi
2003	"Din Hai Na Ye Raat"	Bhoot	Salim–Sulaiman	Hindi
2005	"Rambhe Ninge"	Swamy	Gurukiran	Kannada
2006	"Vaave Makane"	Pothan Vava	Alex Paul	Malayalam
2006	"Meter Iddone"	Ambi	V. Nagendra Prasad	Kannada
2006	"Yarivanu"	Shubham	Gurikiran	Kannada
2007	"Wicket Bacha" (with Earl)	Hattrick	Pritam	Hindi
2007	"Teri Meri Merry Christmas"	Bow barracks Forever	Anjun Dutt	Hindi
2007	"Kshana Kshana"	Kshana Kshana	R. P. Patnaik	Kannada
2008	"Yavva Yavva Naa Hege"	Nee Tata Naa Birla	Gurukiran	Kannada
2009	"Gudsu Gudsu"	Kannadada Kiran Bedi	Hamsalekha	Kannada
2011	"Hai Ye Maya"	Don 2	Shankar–Ehsaan–Loy	Hindi
2011	"Viriyunnu"	Bombay March 12	Afzal Yusuf	Malayalam
2011	"Darling", "Doosri Darling" (with Rekha Bhardwaj)	7 Khoon Maaf	Vishal Bhardwaj	Hindi
2012	"Ramba main Samba"	Shirin Farhad Ki Toh Nikal Padi	Jeet Ganguly	Hindi
2012	"Aami Shotti Bolchi"	Kahaani	Vishal–Shekhar	Hindi
2012	"Yeh Raat Mona Lisa"	Kaafiron Ki Namaaz	Advait Nemlekar	Hindi
2012	"Jhoom Jhoom Zara"	Parie	Veer Samarth	Kannada
2014	"Race Gurram"	Race Gurram	S. Thaman	Telugu
2014	"Dumeel"	Damaal Dumeel	S. Thaman	Tamil
2016	"Hoi Kiw/Chalo Chalo"	Rock On 2	Shankar–Ehsaan–Loy	Hindi
2016	"Dirty Picture"	Thikka	S. Thaman	Telugu
2019	"Empuraane"	Lucifer	Deepak Dev	Malayalam
2021	"Drishyam 2 Title Track"	Drishyam 2	Anil Johnson	Malayalam
2022	"Phire Takao"	Kolkatar Harry	Jeet Ganguly	Bengali
2022	"Chumbok Mon"	Kacher Manush	Nilayan Chatterjee	Bengali
2022	"Drishyam 2 Title Track (Hindi)"	Drishyam 2	Devi Sri Prasad	Hindi
2024	"Lucky Baskhar Title Track"	Lucky Baskhar	G. V. Prakash Kumar	Telugu
2024	"Lucky Baskhar Title Track"	Lucky Baskhar	G. V. Prakash Kumar	Tamil
2024	"Lucky Baskhar Title Track"	Lucky Baskhar	G. V. Prakash Kumar	Hindi
2024	"Lucky Baskhar Title Track"	Lucky Baskhar	G. V. Prakash Kumar	Malayalam
2025	"Azrael"	L2: Empuraan	Deepak Dev	Malayalam
2025	"Ramba Ho"	Dhurandhar	Shashwat Sachdev	Hindi
2026	"G Yaal"	Titans	Dawn Vincent	Malayalam

== Filmography ==
Year	Title	Role	Language
1973	Bombay to Goa		Hindi
1975	Melnaattu Marumagal		Tamil
2006	Pothan Vava	Kurisuveettil Mariamma	Malayalam
2007	Bow Barracks Forever	Herself	English
2007	Hattrick	Herself	Hindi
2010	Manmadan Ambu	Indira	Tamil
2011	7 Khoon Maaf	Maggie Aunty	Hindi
2012	Parie		Kannada
2012	Ideal Couple	Sophy	Malayalam
2012	Keymon & Nani in Space Adventure	Nani (voice role)	Hindi
2015	X: Past Is Present	Mrs. Baker	Hindi
2016	Rock On 2	Herself (cameo)	Hindi
2019	If Not for You	Herself	English
2022	Achcham Madam Naanam Payirppu	Charukesi	Tamil
2025	Good Bad Ugly	Meera Patnayak	Tamil

=== Television ===
Year	Title	Role	Language
2004–2006	Indian Idol	Guest	Hindi
2007–2017	Super Singer Junior	Judge	Tamil
2007–2017	Super Singer Senior	Judge	Tamil
2007–2008	Star Singer	Judge	Malayalam
2011	Sa Re Ga Ma Pa Little Champion	Judge	Kannada
2012	Bharat Ki Shaan: Singing Star – Season 2	Judge	Hindi
2012	Gaurav Maharashtracha	Judge	Marathi
2012	Kuyil Paatu	Judge	Tamil
2016	Phire Asar Gaan	Judge	Bengali
2016	Onnum Onnum Moonu	Guest	Malayalam
2016	Comedy Nights Bachao	Guest	Hindi
2018	Kullfi Kumarr Bajewala	Guest	Hindi
2019	The Kapil Sharma Show	Guest	Hindi

== Awards and nominations ==
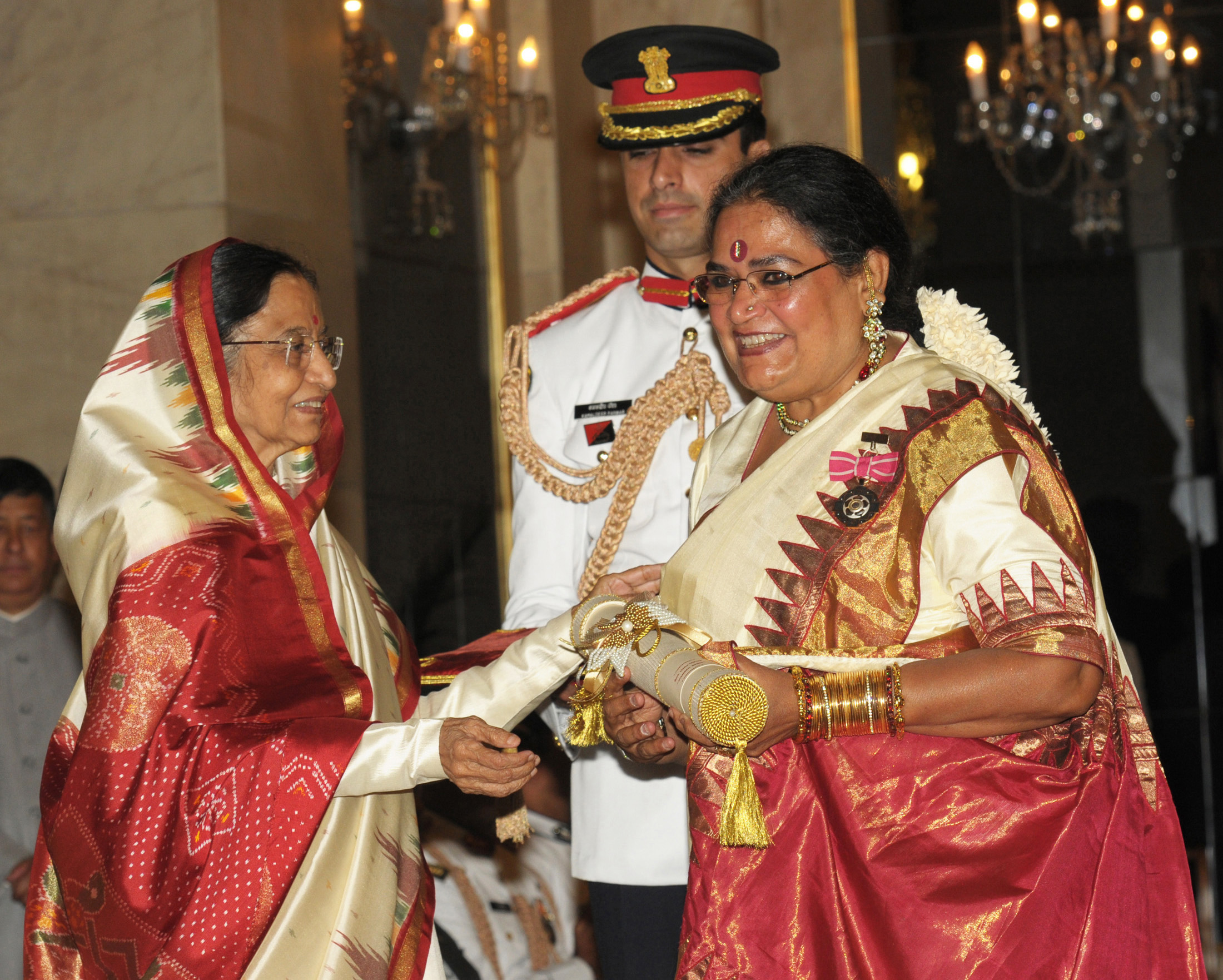
Uthup being awarded Padma Shri, c. 2011

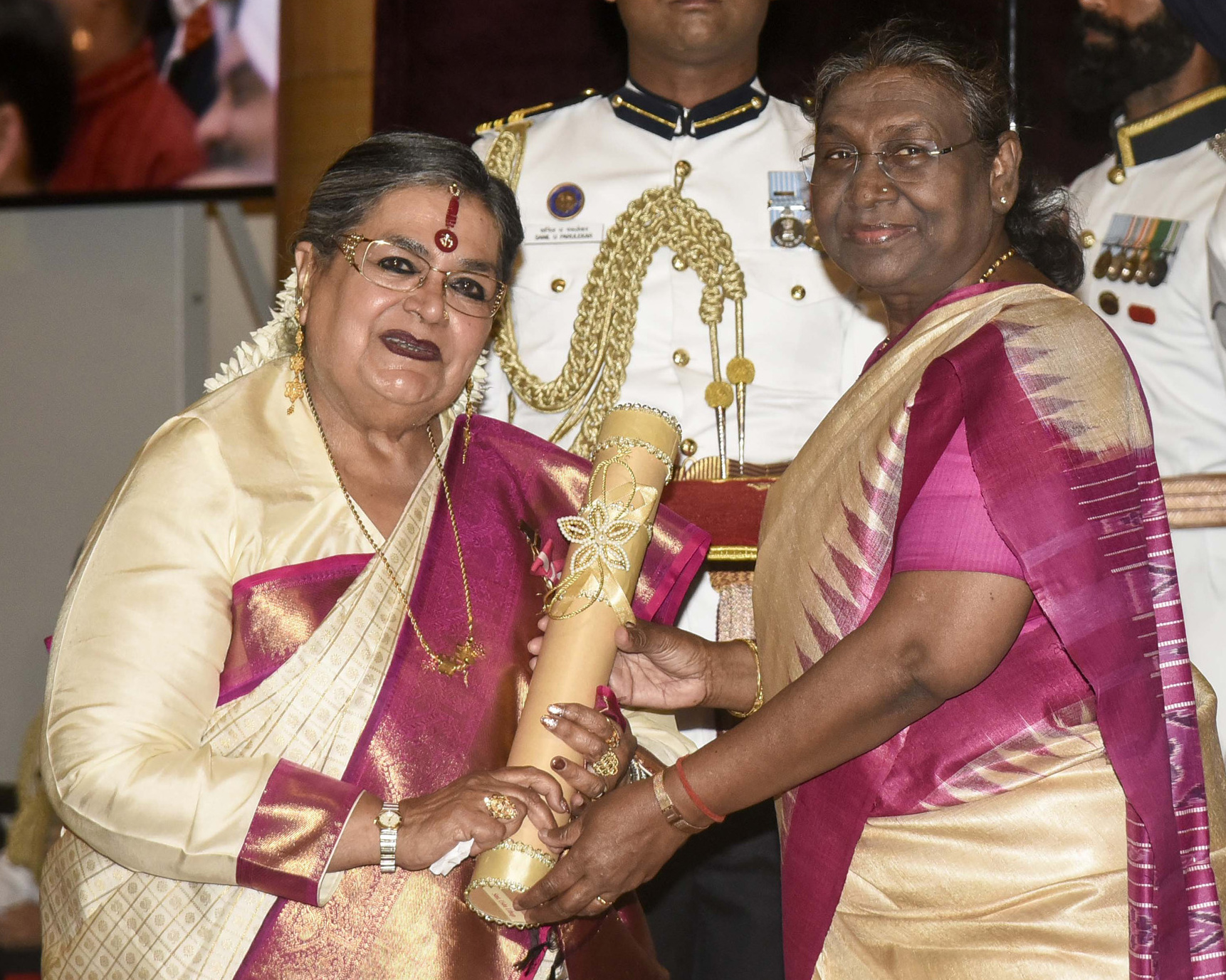
Uthup being awarded Padma Bhushan, c. 2024

=== Civilian awards ===
- Padma Shri - 2011 – Fourth Highest Civilian Award presented by Government of India
- Padma Bhushan - 2024 – Third Highest Civilian Award presented by Government of India

=== Film awards ===
Year	Award	Category	Nominated Song	Film	Result	Ref.
2012	Filmfare Awards	Best Female Playback Singer	"Darling"	7 Khoon Maaf	Won	
2012	IIFA Awards	Best Female Playback Singer	"Darling"	7 Khoon Maaf	Nominated	
2012	Screen Awards	Best Female Playback Singer	"Darling"	7 Khoon Maaf	Nominated	
2012	Mirchi Music Awards	Female Vocalist of The Year	"Darling"	7 Khoon Maaf	Nominated	
2017	Mirchi Music Awards	Lifetime Achievement Award	N/A	N/A	Won	
2006	Asianet Film Awards	Best Character actress	N/A	Pothan Vava	Nominated	
1999	Kalakar Awards	Best Audio Album (Bangla)	"Darling"	N/A	Won	
2002	Kalakar Awards	Best Audio Album (Bangla)	Chai Silpir Samman	N/A	Won	
2004	Kalakar Awards	Best Playback Singer for the film	"Kabhi Pa Liya To Kabhi Kho Diya"	Joggers Park	Won	
2013	Kalakar Awards	Best Playback Singer for the film	"Ramba Mein Samba"	Shirin Farhad Ki Toh Nikal Padi	Won	
