= Haré Rama Haré Krishna =

- Poster
- Directed by: Dev Anand
- Written by: Dev Anand
- Produced by: Dev Anand
- Starring: Dev Anand; Zeenat Aman; Mumtaz
- Cinematography: Fali Mistry
- Edited by: Babu Sheikh
- Music by: R. D. Burman
- Release date: 14 January 1972
- Running time: 149 minutes
- Country: India
- Language: Hindi

Haré Rama Haré Krishna is a 1972 Indian Hindi-language musical satire film written, produced and directed by Dev Anand under the banner of Navketan Films. It stars Anand himself, alongside Mumtaz, Zeenat Aman and Prem Chopra in the lead roles. The film deals with the decadence of the Hippie culture, and aimed to have an anti-drug message and also depicts some problems associated with Westernization.

The film was a hit and a star-making vehicle for Aman, who played a westernized hippie, and won the Filmfare Best Supporting Actress Award, as well as the BFJA Award for Best Actress. It was influenced by the 1968 American psychedelic film Psych-Out.

The idea for Haré Rama Haré Krishna struck Dev Anand, who was low in spirits due to protests against his previous film Prem Pujari, when he visited Kathmandu, Nepal and encountered hippies living there.

== Plot ==
In the background of the rise of the International Hare Krishna movement in the 1970s, is a Montreal-based family of the Jaiswals, consisting of mom, dad, son, Prashant, and daughter, Jasbir. Due to differences, Mr and Mrs Jaiswal separate, leaving Jasbir with dad, and Prashant with his mom. Eventually Prashant and his mom travel to India, leaving father and daughter behind in Montreal. Mr. Jaiswal remarries, and brings his new wife to live in his home. Jasbir is told by her nanny that her mother & brother are dead. Back in India Prashant is sent to a boarding school and his father makes sure that none of Prashant's letters reach Jasbir, so that it would be easy on her part to get over emotional trauma. Jasbir is upset with her inconsiderate step-mother and ignorant father who is deeply immersed in his business.

Years later, Prashant has grown up to be a pilot. He has received a letter from his dad that Jasbir, who had rebelled and left home, is now located in Kathmandu, Nepal, with a group of hippies. Prashant decides to find his sister and hopefully get her back to the family. When Prashant lands in Kathmandu he does not find Jasbir, but instead finds Janice, who is indeed his sister with a new name. Janice has no recollection of her childhood, and is always in the company of hippies spending most of her time consuming alcohol & drugs with them.

Janice lives with the hippies in the property rented out by local landlord Drona. Drona's real business is stealing ancient artifacts from Kathmandu and selling it to foreign nationals. Michael, one of the hippies, is the one who does all the dirty work for him. Janice's boyfriend Deepak misunderstands that Prashant is trying to woo Janice, hence they exchange a few blows every time they meet. Meanwhile, Drona has an eye on Shanti, a local salesgirl working in one of the shops owned by him. Shanti has feelings for Prashant which creates one more enemy for him. Later Prashant and Shanti elope and get married. At the same time a precious idol is stolen from local temple by Michael, which he hides in Janice's house. Prashant secretly observes all this. Drona tries to frame Shanti for theft by secretly planting another stolen artifact in her house. Later he spreads the word that since the day Prashant has arrived idols are being stolen and he is stalking local girls.

The police commissioner is a friend of Prashant's father, and has already received a letter stating the purpose of Prashant's visit to Kathmandu. He suspects that Drona is trying to frame Prashant because he has married Shanti. He gets a search warrant for the entire property of Drona and recovers a diary which has contact details of his friends abroad who help him sell the stolen artifacts. The police also recover the stolen artifact from Shanti's home, squarely blaming Prashant for it. Shanti is deeply hurt by this and looks around for Prashant. Prashant meanwhile is with Janice, trying to convince her that he is her brother, who she had been told dead long back. Michael overhears the conversation & conspires to put the blame on the brother-sister duo. Taking advantage of the situation Drona and Michael instigate the locals against Prashant by framing him for the theft and duping Shanti under pretext of marriage. The hippies and the locals are now ready to bash Prashant the moment they come across him.

When Prashant again tries to meet Janice, the hippies give him a solid thrashing. The police commissioner intervenes and Prashant is saved. At the same time the true face of Drona is uncovered and he meets his end trying to run away from police. Janice sees that both her parents have arrived to meet her and realizes that Prashant is indeed her brother. Janice is deeply hurt that her parents had to see her in this state. She runs away from them and commits suicide. In her suicide note she tells Prashant how deeply she loved him and she never intended him to find her in this state and suicide was the only way out for her.

== Cast ==
- Dev Anand- Prashant Jaiswal
- Zeenat Aman – Jasbir Jaiswal / Janice
- Mumtaz – Shanti
- Baby Guddi – Young Jasbir
- Satyajeet – Young Prashant (as Master Satyajit)
- Prem Chopra – Dronacharya
- Rajendra Nath – Toofan
- Mehmood Jr. – Machina
- Sudhir – Michael
- Kishore Sahu – Mr. Jaiswal
- Achala Sachdev – Mrs. Jaiswal
- Mumtaz Begum – Shanti's Mother
- Iftekhar – IGP
- Raj Kishore – Sakhi
- Gautam Sarin – Deepak
- Indrani Mukherjee – Mrs. Jaiswal (2nd)
- Yashodra Katju – (as Yashodhra Katju)

== Awards ==
20th Filmfare Awards:

Won

- Best Supporting Actress – Zeenat Aman
- Best Female Playback Singer – Asha Bhosle for "Dum Maro Dum"

== Soundtrack ==
Haré Rama Haré Krishna

Soundtrack album by R. D. Burman
- Released: 4 June 1971
- Length: 52:39
- Language: Hindi
- Label: Saregama
- Director: Dev Anand
- Producer: Dev Anand

R. D. Burman chronology
Hungama (1971)	Haré Rama Haré Krishna (1971)	Shehzada (1971)

The music of the film was composed by Rahul Dev Burman and the lyrics were written by Anand Bakshi. Initially, Burman's father, S.D. Burman, was to compose the music. However, he stepped back as he felt the film contained an incest angle between the sibling characters, Prashant and Janice. This prompted R.D. Burman to come on board, marking his first of many successful collaborations with Dev Anand.

The songs, "Dum Maro Dum" and "Hare Rama Hare Krishna" were instant hits with the youth even as "Kanchi Re Kanchi Re", "Dekho O Diwano" and "Phoolon Ka Taron Ka" showed the versatility of composer R.D. Burman. Asha Bhosle won Filmfare Best Female Playback Award for the song "Dum Maro Dum", which was a huge hit. Biggest Nepali musician Ranjit Gazmer played the madal in this movie. R.D. Burman gave him a chance in Bollywood films as he also heard Ranjit's composed song "Kancha Re Kancha" and re-write the song lyrics and composition as in Hindi Kanchi Re Kanchi Re which was sung by Kishore Kumar and Lata Mangeshkar.

#	Title	Singer(s)	Length
1	"Hare Rama Hare Krishna (Female Version)"	Asha Bhosle, Usha Uthup	3:47
2	"Dekho O Diwano"	Kishore Kumar	4:31
3	"Dum Maro Dum"	Asha Bhosle	2:36
4	"Hare Rama Hare Krishna, Pt. 1 (Dance Version)"	Usha Uthup	2:17
5	"Hare Rama Hare Krishna, Pt. 2 (Dance Version)"	Usha Uthup	1:32
6	"O Re Ghungroo Ka Bole"	Lata Mangeshkar	5:02
7	"Phoolon Ka Taron Ka (Female)"	Lata Mangeshkar	3:30
8	"Phoolon Ka Taron Ka (Male)	Kishore Kumar	6:00
9	"Kanchi Re Kanchi"	Kishore Kumar, Lata Mangeshkar	4:57
10	"Kanchi Re Kanchi (Revival)"	Kishore Kumar, Lata Mangeshkar	

== See also ==
- Hare Krishna in popular culture
