= Mood Indigo (festival) =

Annual cultural festival of the Indian Institute of Technology Bombay

- Genre: cultural
- Frequency: annually
- Venue: Indian Institute of Technology Bombay
- Location: Mumbai
- Country: India
- Inaugurated: 1973; 53 years ago
- Attendance: 150,000+ (2022)
- Organiser: Student community of IIT Bombay
- Website: moodi.org

Mood Indigo, otherwise known as MoodI or MI, is the cultural and signature festival of the Indian Institute of Technology Bombay. Mood Indigo was held in over 4,000+ colleges and universities before ending in IIT Bombay.

== History ==
A group of the first Mood Indigo organizers gave the festival its name from Duke Ellington's jazz piece "Mood Indigo". Mood Indigo had a legacy of organizers that included Nandan Nilekani and Sivakumaran among others. Mood Indigo started in 1971 with a budget of ₹5,000, which was partly contributed by the IIT Bombay Gymkhana and advertisements. The 1981 edition of MI had the duo Asha Bhosle and R D Burman perform at the Indian Music Night.

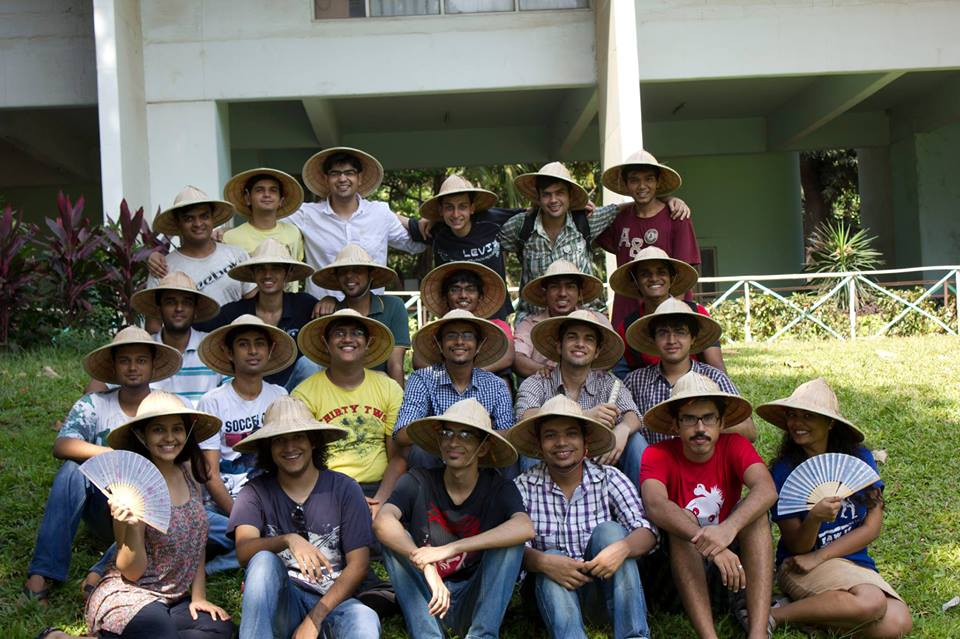
The Core Group Members of Mood Indigo 2013

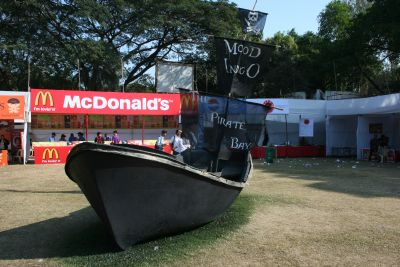
Pirate Ship from Mood Indigo 2009

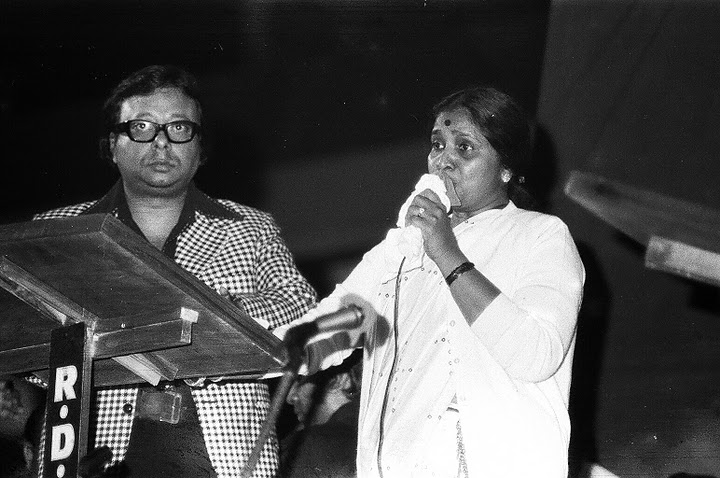
R D Burman and Asha Bhosale at Mood Indigo 1981

From a sponsorship of around 5 lakhs in 1993, Mood Indigo had grown to have a budget of around ₹2.4 million in 1997. In 2008, the first night in the form of an Ensiferum concert was held. In 2009, the band Porcupine Tree came to India for the first time to perform at MI. It also had performances by Parikrama, Alms for Shanti and concerts by the trio of Shankar–Ehsaan–Loy and Manna Dey. This edition also showcased Victor Rubilar, the French band Moriarty and Swedish performer Meja.

In 2010, MI held its first Sumo Wrestling match between three-time world sumo champion Byambajav Ulambayar and former world champion Naranbat Gankhuyag. The Swedish metal band Katatonia had its first Asian performance in MI. Apart from them, MI 2010 also witnessed performances by Asha Bhosle, Indus Creed and Amit Trivedi as well as interactive sessions with Ramchandra Guha and a Harley Davidson Bike exhibition. The International Music Festival had the Indo-German rock band Fire On Dawson, French percussionist Minino Garay, Glass harp musicians Glass Duo and the fusion band KarmetiK.

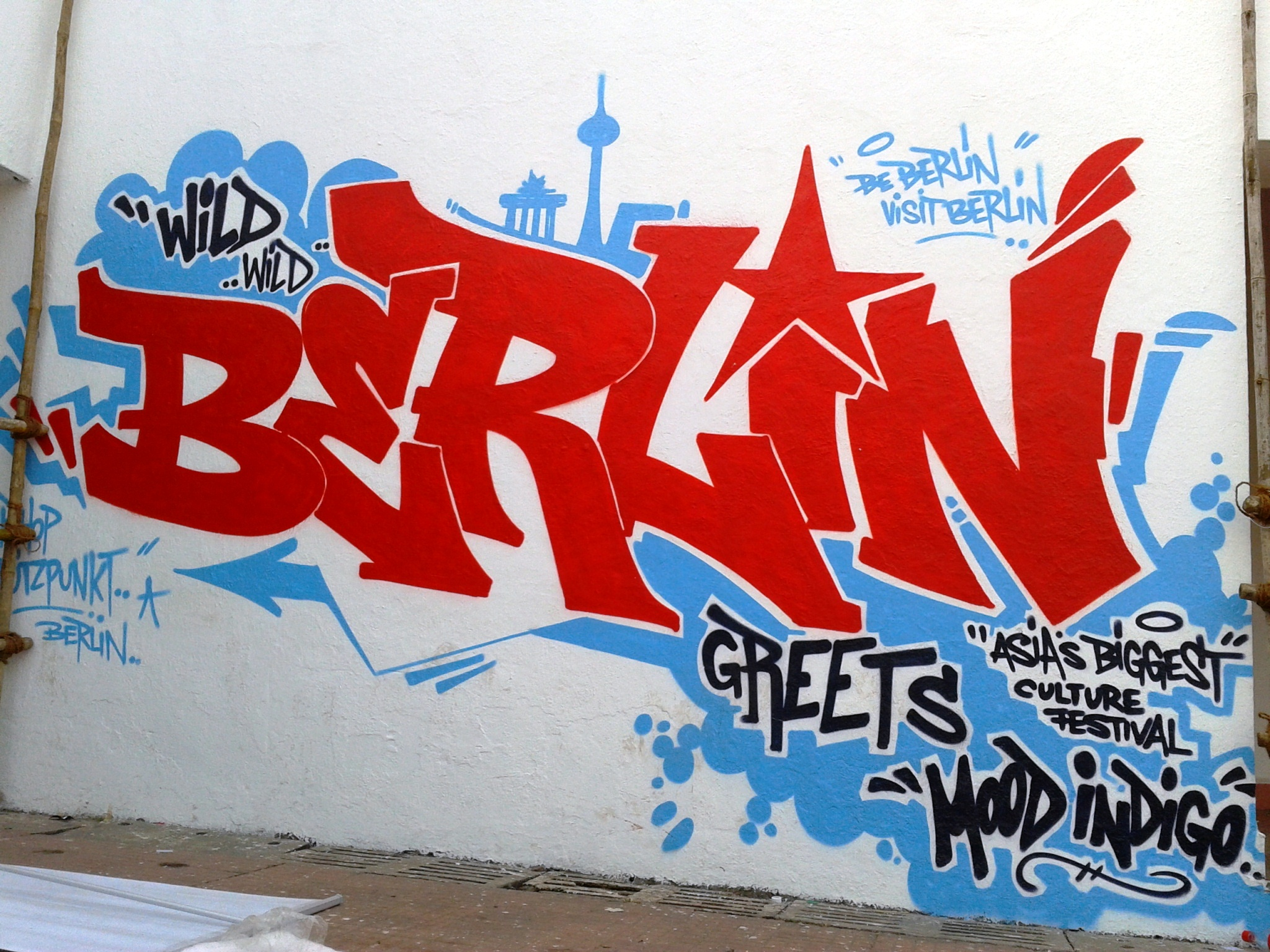
Graffiti by German artists at the Open Air Theatre for MI 2011

Karnivool, the Australian progressive rock band, performed in India for the first time at Mood Indigo 2011. MI made it into the Limca Book of Records for the most number of international artists at a college festival. Other performances included Gamblerz and Gong Myoung from Korea. The 2012 Mood Indigo promoted tribal culture and tribal practices and included a social initiative called "Hakuna Matata -Spread a Smile". Simple Plan, the Canadian punk rock band, headlined Mood Indigo in 2012.

The 2012 edition hosted India's first international carnival and Bollywood actors Anushka Sharma, Imran Khan, Arjun Rampal and Chitrangada Singh. The concerts have performances by Pandit Vishwa Mohan Bhatt, Talavya, Karsh Kale collective, Salim–Sulaiman and DJ Lloyd. Mood Indigo 2013, the "Oriental East", saw a display of 3,000 Korean lanterns. Mike Portnoy performed alongside Neal Morse for the first time in Asia during this event. Mood Indigo 2014, themed "A Vintage Affair", featured installations including a vintage car, gramophones, typewriters and cassette film art. EDM artist Sander Van Doorn, Dutch symphonic metal band Epica, Adnan Sami and Bollywood heartthrobs Vishal–Shekhar performed in the concerts at Mood Indigo 2014. In 2015, with the theme "A Hawaiian Escapade", the campus featured a 10-ft sand castle, tikkis, beachballs and surfboards. New bars for entertainment were set with the hosting of "Silent Disco". The Mood Indigo, themed "A Bombay Chronicle", has interactive installations of the city of Mumbai. Mood Indigo 2017, "La Fete Carnaval", featured artists Biswa Kalyan Rath, the Bassjackers, Akshay Kumar, P. Chidambaram, Amit Trivedi and Haken. The 2018 edition of Mood Indigo, themed "A Montage of Dreams", has DJ MAG 23 Ummet Ozcan, Mithila Palkar, Leprous, Salim Merchant, Sulaiman Merchant, Papon, Prateek Kuhad, Abhishek Upmanyu, Kunal Kamra, Smriti Irani and others. Due to the coronavirus pandemic, the 2020 and 2021 editions were organised online as virtual events.

== Events ==
=== Concerts ===
Concerts or "Pronites" feature national and international artists. Mood Indigo Pronites have staged international bands like Epica, the Neal Morse band featuring Mike Portnoy in 2013, Simple Plan in 2012, Karnivool in 2011, Katatonia in 2010, Porcupine Tree in 2009 and Ensiferumin in 2008. Mood Indigo also played host to its first EDM concert with DJ Lange performing in 2013. This was followed by a concert featuring Sander van Doorn in 2014 and Borgeous in Mood Indigo 2015. Ummet Ozcan (DJ MAG 23) performed in the EDM Nite on the first day of Mood Indigo 2018.

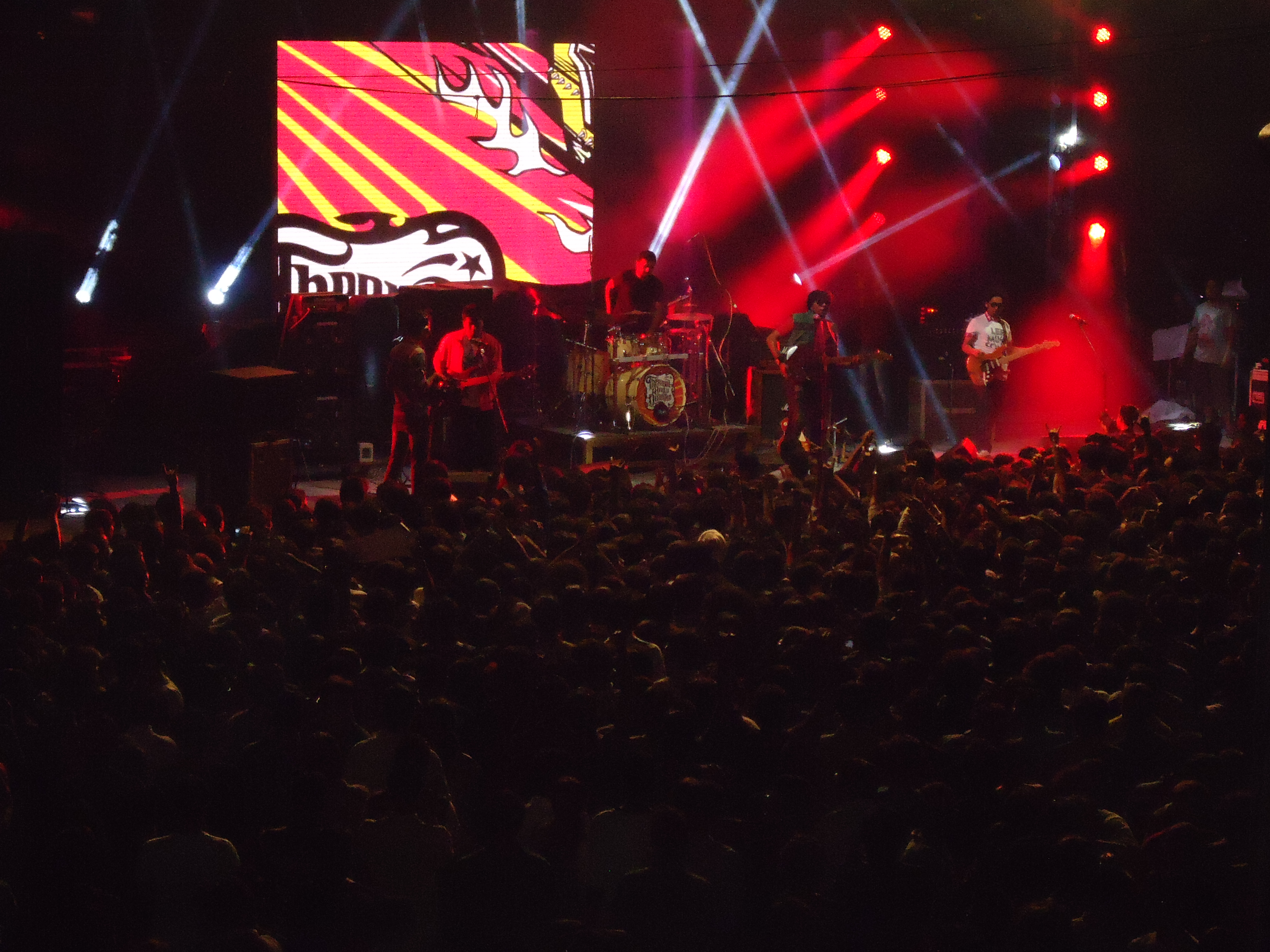
Pronites at Mood Indigo

Pronites has also hosted Asha Bhosle (once with music director R D Burman in 1981 and again in 2010), Jagjit Singh, Shankar–Ehsaan–Loy, Sonu Nigam, Shaan, Amit Trivedi, Kailash Kher, Salim–Sulaiman, Mohit Chauhan, Vishal–Shekhar, Pritam, Adnan Sami, Raghu Dixit, KK, Lucky Ali, Amit Kumar, Kavita Seth, Pankaj Udhas, Raghav Sachar, Agnee the band and Javed Ali. Classical artists like Hari Prasad Chaurasia, Zakir Hussain, Bhimsen Joshi, Jasraj, Shiv Kumar Sharma, Vikku Vinayakram, Rajan and Sajan Mishra, sitar maestro Ustad Amjad Ali Khan and his sons Ayaan and Amaan Ali Bangash, Vishwa Mohan Bhatt, Manna Dey, and Taufiq Qureshi have performed here as well.

Fusion artists including Louis Banks, Niladri Kumar, Sivamani, and Alms for Shanti have performed in the past at Mood Indigo. Pronites also organizes Livewire, a rock band competition, and bands Parikrama, Zero and Vayu. Events in the past have included Motherjane, Indus Creed, and Sceptre. In 2012, over 200 bands from across the country participated in the competition, with preliminary rounds being held in Mumbai, Delhi, Bangalore, and Kolkata.

Mood Indigo has also hosted a number of Indian rock and fusion bands like Indus Creed, Euphoria, Indian Ocean, Motherjane, Parikrama, Thermal and a Quarter, Sceptre, Antaragni, and Zero, and international bands like Canadian band Q.E.D.

=== Competitions ===
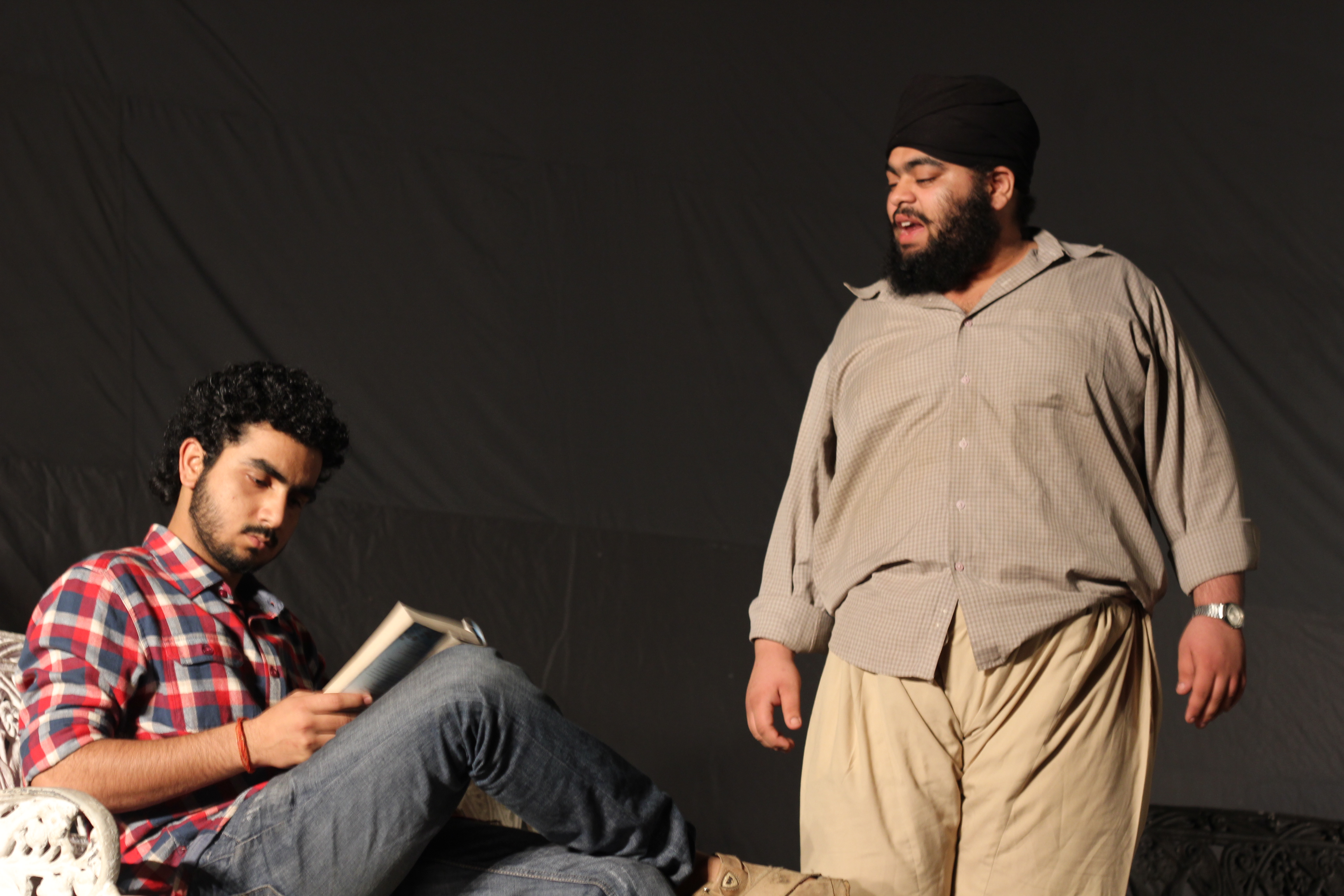
Khalsa college in finals of third bell

Competitions at Mood Indigo cover arts, lifestyle, film and media, music, dance, and journalism. The finalists of the dance competition 'Dancing with the Stars' performed for an audience of 3,500 and were judged by Shahid Kapoor and Rajiv Surty. The finalists of the music event 'Singing with the Stars' were judged by singers Kavita Seth, Meiyang Chang, and Shibani Kashyap. Aagaaz the street play competition, in its third edition, in Mood Indigo 2012, gave the winners a chance to perform at the National Center for Performing Arts.

The performing arts competition (One Act) called 'Third Bell' has had judges including Anupam Kher, Himani Shivpuri, Shobha Khote, Amit Behl, Piyush Mishra and Lalit Parimoo. The winners of this competition are also given a chance to perform at the National Center of Performing Arts. Its stage has played host to Amjad Khan and Mani Ratnam. In 2012, the filmmaking event 'Director's cut' gave the director of the top two entries a chance to produce a short film with Bejoy Nambiar. In 2013, the winners of the SGTL event received a direct entry into the Femina Miss India eliminations and won a photo shoot with Dabboo Ratnani. In 2010, a book cover design competition was organized in association with author Anita Nair. In 2015, the Hindi Poetry event was judged by Swanand Kirkire and MI Idol, and the singing competition was judged by Papon.

=== Horizons ===
Horizons debuted in 1989 as a set of workshops and lectures on the arts as an experiment.

In 2012, Mood Indigo hosted more than 150 foreign artists internationally. It includes Canadian comedian Michel Lauzière, Irish sword swallower Murray Molloy, American fire artist Jason Divad, Monsieur Gusto, The Chancy Brothers, Wacky Chad and others.

=== International Music Festival (IMF) ===
The International Music Festival started in 2009 and has brought to MI performers like the French group Moriarty, Fire On Dawson from Germany, Norwegian band Indian Core, Tarq Bowen from the UK, Swedish performer Meja and the Glass Duo from Poland. Mood Indigo 2011 saw bands like Akasha from Malaysia and Caladh Nua from Ireland perform while the other shows included a performance by the Gamblerz crew from South Korea and Jean Francois from Las Vegas. In 2010, a sumo wrestling at Mood Indigo.

=== Talent Fiesta ===
Other shows include the Korean break dance troupe B-boyz, circus performance by Nofit State Circus, Tararam Israeli trash band that performed at the Athens Olympics, Adam Winrich, the Sabri brothers and others. Horizons has also hosted Victor Rubilar, street magician Chris Korn, Cile, a magic show by P C Sorcar, Sudarshan Patnaik's sand sculptures, Hasya Kavi Sammelan, a puppetry show, synchronized swimming and diving, and Film Fest.

=== LitFest ===
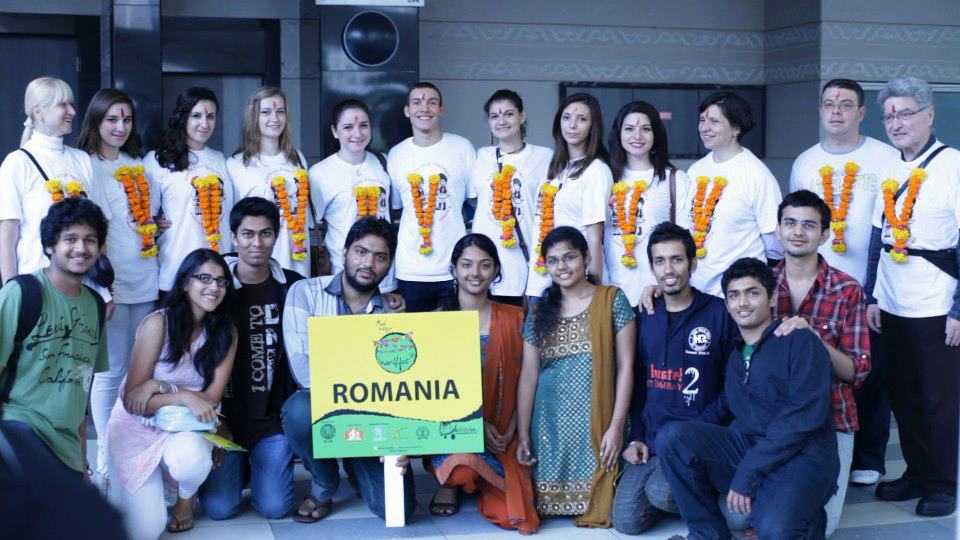
Mood Indigo Worldfest, 2012

The LitFest is an event where speakers hold panel discussions and interact with students. It has played host to panelists and speakers like Smriti Irani, Kiran Bedi, Prakash Jha, Rakeysh Omprakash Mehra, Shankar Mahadevan, Mahesh Bhatt, Pankaj Pachauri, Ramachandra Guha and Rohit Shetty. The 2013 edition of Illuminati featured talks by Aamir Khan, LinkedIn CEO Nishant Rao, S. Hussain Zaidi and Mir Ranjan Negi. In 2014, it featured talks by Amish Tripathi, Rajdeep Sardesai and Subramanian Swamy. In 2015, LitFest hosted Shashi Tharoor and Markandey Katju. 'Bollywood Panel' had directors from the Indian film industry like Ramesh Sippy, Anurag Kashyap and Rajkumar Hirani. "Eloquence", an event in LitFest has an interview session with Devendra Fadnavis, the chief minister of the state of Maharashtra, by journalist Arnab Goswami. The 2017's featured P. Chidambaram, Anurag Kashyap, Manoj Bajpayee, and others.

=== Worldfest ===
Worldfest is an initiative for participation in tours and parties in the host city of Mumbai. Worldfest 2011 brought together groups from Spain, Turkey, Poland and Indonesia to perform on a single platform. In 2012, Italy, Japan, Romania, Serbia and Sri Lanka exhibited their culture and food. Representatives from these countries also participated in the Carnival.

== Campaigns ==
=== Khoon Chala (2008–2009) ===
Khoon Chala was the Mood Indigo blood donation drive, started in 2008. Street plays were organised, and short films were screened in 30 colleges and 7 cineplexes respectively. In the two editions of MI when the donation drive was held, more than 2500 units of blood were collected.

=== Aagaaz (2010) ===
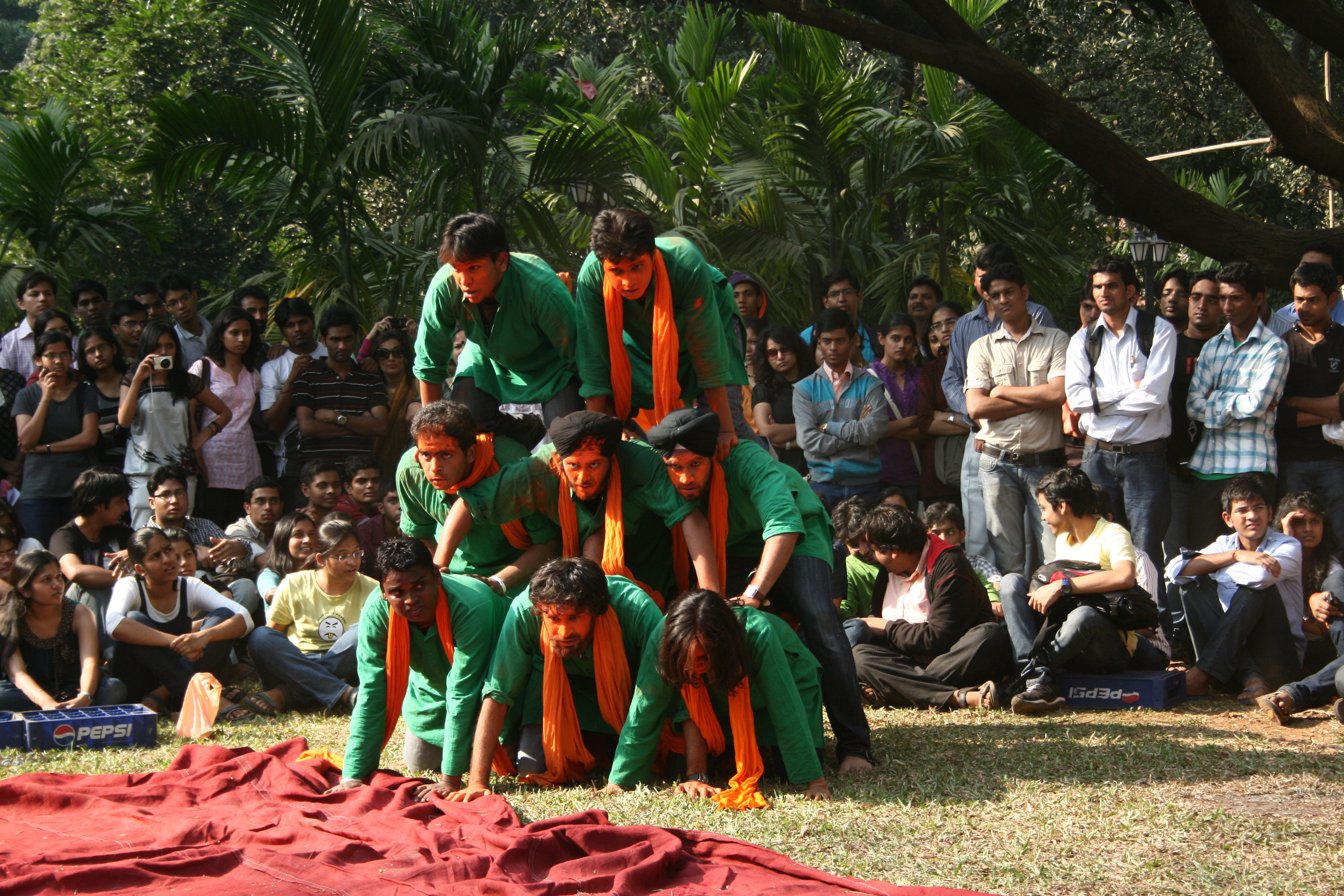
Aagaaz, street plays at Mood Indigo 2010

Aagaaz ("The beginning") was a countrywide social awareness campaign through street plays.

=== Thalassemia (2012) ===
To spread awareness about thalassemia, a social cause campaign was launched in Mood Indigo 2012. Thalassemia testing camps were set up in various locations and colleges, and about 1,400 people were tested.

== Publicity ==
Mood Indigo has attracted sponsorships from various corporations. Brands having sponsored Mood Indigo in the past include OnePlus, Nivea, Tata Photon, Oreo, LinkedIn, Tata Docomo, Colgate, Parle, State Bank of India, Canara Bank, Pepsi, Coca-Cola, WWE, MTV, PVR, Inox, Fame, Levi's, Reliance, Nokia, BlackBerry, Cisco, Pantaloons Femina, Maybelline, McDonald's, Domino's Pizza, Subway, Limca Book of Records, Go-Jiyo and Braingain Magazine. Cadbury-owned biscuit brand, Oreo, set a new Guinness World Record at Mood Indigo 2013 where all of 1,796 people simultaneously consumed Oreo biscuits in the brand's signature 'Twist, Lick, Dunk' style, breaking the previous record set by 1,503 people in Argentina.

Mood Indigo has been covered by The Times of India, Hindustan Times, The Economic Times and others. Over the years, the festival has been covered in several youth-centric shows like MTV Wassup!, UTV Campus Attack. Some of the popular events covered on television were Sumo Wrestling on ESPN and Sahara, Livewire by Zee Music and Shahid Kapoor by NDTV. In 2010, footage of Amit Trivedi's Mood Indigo 2010 concert was used in the DVD edition of the 2010 film, Udaan.
