= Diabolus Arcanium =

Indian black metal band

- Also known as: DA
- Origin: Chennai, India
- Genres: Black metal
- Years active: 2011–2016
- Labels: Transcending obscurity, Haught Records
- Members: Hex; Roshan; Teeto; Bishwanth
- Website: Official Diabolus Arcanium website

Diabolus Arcanium was an Indian black metal band that was formed in 2011.The band is a result of Hex's interest in darker music, and not being able to do that with Fortified Destruction he renamed the band to Diabolus arcanium. The band combines elements of black metal (screeching vocals, keyboards/orchestra) with some neo-classical guitar influences. Lyrical themes vary, and address Satanism, death, war, lost love, and anti-religious themes.

The band after the new name and line up got signed to Haught records (USA) and released their demo album Spellbound to mostly good reviews.

They released their demo album, Spellbound in 2014. The band also released their debut album titled Path of Ascension with a partially live recorded orchestra.

The band released a single paying a tribute to Emperor with a cover of "I Am The Black Wizards," taken off the In The Nightside Eclipse album.

== Path of Ascension 2015 ==
The band fired their previous members Nero, Solas and Astaroth due to some internal issues while their album Path of Ascension was in post-production. Later the band continued with only Hex and Archon to finish the recording. They signed on with extreme metal record label Transcending Obscurity for the release of their album which was named as Path of Ascension. Later the band announced that Vishesh will be taking up the drummer's duties and subsequently announced the arrival of Abraxas and Tormentor on rhythm guitars and bass respectively. The album released via Transcending Obscurity Records on 15 August 2015, worldwide to good reviews and was commercially successful for the band. The band went on to win an award at Rolling Stone's annual metal awards function later that year.

== Entity Of Hate/Cybernation ==
The announced their new album titled "Death of a World" citing significant changes in their lineup and musical style shifting towards industrial rock/metal. They released a short 40-second preview and the album was slated for a late 2016/early 2017 release, but later on the band went on to change their name as "Entity Of Hate" with new members and released an EP titled "Cursed For Eternity", Diabolus Arcanium also spawned a side project band named "Cybernation" which followed a more industrial sound.

== Members ==
=== members ===
- Hex – vocals, guitars, bass
- Roshan Y R – keyboards, orchestration and bass guitar
- Bishwanth Y R – drums

== Discography ==
- Spellbound (Demo album) (2014)
- "I am the Black Wizards" (Cover single) (2014)
- "Freezing Moon" (Cover single) (2015)
- Path of Ascension (Full-length album) (2016)

== See also ==
- Indian rock
- Kryptos (band)
- Bhayanak Maut
- Nicotine (band)
- Inner Sanctum (band)
- Demonic Resurrection
