= Nerverek =

Indian progressive metal band

NerveRek
- Origin: Chennai, India
- Genres: Progressive metal
- Years active: 2003 - present
- Members: Arjun 'Chiq' Dhanraj; Ishaan Krishna; Ritesh John Dharmaraj; Ananth Kumar
- Past members: Rohith Abraham; Krishnan Swaminathan; Keshav Dhanraj; T.T Sriram; Jitesh Dharmaraj; Shayne Fernandes

Nerverek is an Indian progressive metal band formed in Chennai, India. The band won Campus Rock Idols '07, becoming the first South Indian band to win the national inter-college contest. They performed recently as the opening act for international act, the Scorpions in Bangalore and also opened for Iron Maiden in their tour to India at Mumbai on 1 February 2008. In January 2011, they opened for Pain of Salvation along with Bicycle Days at Saarang 2011, the annual cultural festival of IIT Madras.

They are planning to release their first record, Forever Endeavour, in March–April 2008.

== Band members ==
- Arjun 'Chiq' Dhanraj: Vocals, guitar
- Ishaan Krishna: Bass, backing vocals
- Ritesh John Dharmaraj: Drums
- Ananth Kumar: Keyboards, backing vocals

== See also ==
- Indian rock
- Kryptos (band)
- Bhayanak Maut
- Nicotine (band)
- Inner Sanctum (band)
- Demonic Resurrection
