= Heathen Beast =

- Origin: Mumbai, India
- Genres: Grindcore, black metal (early)
- Years active: 2010–present

Heathen Beast is a grindcore atheistic trio from Mumbai, India consisting of Carvaka on vocals and guitars, Samkhya on bass and Mimamsa on drums. The band works under pseudonyms to hide their true identities. Their debut EP Ayodhya Burns was released in 2010 as a CD release limited to 200 hand-numbered copies and as a free download and received generally favorable reviews. In May 2012, they released their second EP, entitled The Drowning of the Elephant God; the EP was only released as a free download. It was well received by the fans and it got high critical acclaim. In May 2015, they released their third EP, entitled "The Carnage of Godhra". This was released as a free download. Again in July 2015, they released 'Trident', a CD which had compiled all the songs from the three EPs.

In April 2016, they released their fourth EP, entitled 'The Rise of the Saffron Empire'. This EP was released via Transcending Obscurity and it was available in both digital and physical format, the digital format for free download once again.

== Discography ==
- Ayodhya Burns (EP, 2010)
- The Drowning of the Elephant God (EP, 2012)
- The Carnage of Godhra (EP, 2015)
- The Rise of the Saffron Empire (EP, 2016)
- $cam (EP, 2017)
- Bloody Sabarimala (2018)
- Fuck All Religions, Equally (2019)
- The Revolution Will Not Be Televised but It Will Be Heard (LP, 2020)

== Compilation CDs ==
- Trident (Compilation Album of the three EPs, 2015)

=== Appearances in compilations ===
- Love at First Grind – Vol. 3 (2011)

== See also ==
- Indian rock
- Kryptos
- Bhayanak Maut
- Nicotine
- Inner Sanctum
- Demonic Resurrection
