= Strawberry Fields (Indian festival) =

Annual Music fest of the National Law School of India University

- Genre: Music Fest
- Begins: 1997; 29 years ago
- Frequency: Annual
- Venue: National Law School Of India University
- Location: Bengaluru
- Country: India
- Attendance: 8,000+ (2019)
- Organiser: Event Management Committee, NLSIU
- Website: www.strawberryfields.in

Strawberry Fields is an annual independent music festival held in Bangalore, India. It is one of India's largest student-organized music festivals, and attracts participants and audiences from across India and neighboring countries. The event is organized by the National Law School of India University, primarily by the student body, but with the official support of the university authorities. It provides a platform for semi-professional and college bands to compete and showcase their talent to a live audience of over 8000 people. The competition has built a legacy amongst music enthusiasts and has bolstered the independent music scene in India. It has served as a launch pad for bands like Motherjane, Thermal and a Quarter, Demonic Resurrection, Bhayanak Maut, and Kryptos. Many influential bands such as Parvaaz, Inner Sanctum, The Down Troddence and Parikrama have headlined at Strawberry Fields. The event is usually held on the university campus, although it was held in the Bangalore Palace grounds in 2002, 2003, 2004, and 2013.

== History ==
The festival was established in 1997 by a committee led by Rahul Cherian, and has been repeated every year since then. The scope of the festival has grown annually, and it has now become the primary showcase for up and coming musicians from across south Asia. The Rock Street Journal has rated Strawberry Fields as "India's best college rock festival". Entry to the festival has been free for audiences since its inception.

The festival was founded as a platform for independent grassroots musicians in India, and has been a stepping stone to success for several Indian musicians including Thermal and a Quarter, Pin Drop Violence, Kryptos (band) and many others.

== Events ==
=== Battle of the Bands ===
Although primarily a festival, there is also an element of competition, with a large cash prize provided for the winning band. The competition is usually divided into a three day format. The first two days features upcoming bands across India perform their act in front of a panel of music experts. The final day consists of performances by the five best bands and the winner is decided. Following the death in 2013 of the festival founder, the prize for the winner is now known as the Rahul Cherian Prize. The value of the prize in 2013 was 25,000 Indian rupees and has steadily grown. Prizes are also provided for individual excellence.

=== Headlining Acts ===
The performances by amateur and upcoming bands is followed by performances by influential musicians and bands from across India. Along with this, the winner of the earlier edition, performs at the next edition as a headliner. Strawberry Fields has featured many impressive headliners over the years which has increased its popularity among the student community. Some of the past headliners include Parvaaz in 2012, 2016 and 2020, Parikrama in 2009, The Down Troddence in 2013 and Inner Sanctum in 2009 and 2011.

== Media, Sponsors and Publicity ==
Strawberry Fields has attracted sponsorships from various corporations and companies over the years. Some past sponsors include MTV, Vh1, TVS, fastrack, Saavn, Tinder, Himalaya, and PETA. Further many radio channels like Radio City and Radio Mirchi have sponsored the event. Newspapers like the Deccan Herald and the Times of India have both powered the event, and given media coverage to it. Strawberry Fields garners extensive media coverage in both local and national newspapers, along with news websites.
