= Guillotine (band) =

Indian progressive metal band

Background information
- Origin: New Delhi, Delhi, India
- Genres: Death metal, progressive metal
- Years active: 2010–present
- Label: Unsigned
- Members: Karan Nambiar; Takar Nabam; Kabir Mahajan; Akshat Taneja; Rohit Bhattacharya
- Past members: Manav Chauhan
- Website: guillotine.in

Guillotine is a progressive metal band from Delhi. They play melodies ranging from blues, jazz to death metal. The band has released one album The Cynic in 2010. They indicate that their original tracks are basically a part of a three tier concept of a man's realisation of the hollowness of religious faith. The Cynic is a concept album about a man who is an atheist and frustrated by the fact that religion has taken over society.

Guillotine Won first prize at the coveted Rocktaves held at BITS, Pilani in the year 2009.

At the annual National Rock Contest held in Nagaland in the Hornbill Festival in 2010, Guillotine won the second prize. And Akshat Taneja winning the best keyboard player award.

After a nationwide competition, Guillotine were chosen to open for Metallica in Gurgaon. After the Gurgaon show was cancelled, they opened the Rock 'N India 2011 show along with Inner Sanctum and Scottish Band Biffy Clyro for Metallica on 30 October 2011.

They state Opeth, Porcupine Tree, Pain of Salvation, Guthrie Govan, Pink Floyd, Steve Vai, Greg Howe, Deep Purple are among their major influences.

== Members ==
Current members

- Karan Nambiar – vocals
- Takar Nabam – guitar, vocals
- Kabir Mahajan – drums
- Akshat Taneja – keyboards
- Rohit Bhattacharya – bass

Past members

- Manav Chauhan – keyboards

== See also ==
- Indian rock
- Kryptos (band)
- Nicotine (band)
- Bhayanak Maut
- Inner Sanctum (band)
- Demonic Resurrection
