= Amorphia =

Indian thrash metal band

- Origin: Kerala, India
- Genres: Thrash metal
- Years active: 2012–present
- Labels: Awakening, CHINA (2019–present)
- Members: Vasuchandran MV; Vivek Prasad

Amorphia is an Indian thrash metal band from Kerala, formed in 2012. The band is influenced by German and American metal bands such as Sodom, Kreator, Accuser, Demolition Hammer and Slayer.

== History ==
Amorphia have released two albums, three singles, and are working on their third studio album. They released their first single, "Master of Death", in 2014, which quickly spread through the Indian metal underground and other parts of the world. In April 2018, the band released their debut album, Arms to Death, and in 2020, the band released their second album, Merciless Strike.

In 2019 February and 2020 February, the band did two consecutive Japan tours, including True thrash fest 11th edition (2019) and 12th edition (2020).

== Band members ==
- Vasuchandran MV – vocals, guitar
- Vivek Prasad – drums

== Discography ==
- Arms to Death (2014)
- Merciless Strike (2020)
- Lethal Dose (2022)

== See also ==
- Indian rock
- Kryptos (band)
- Bhayanak Maut
- Nicotine (band)
- Inner Sanctum (band)
- Demonic Resurrection
