= Midhaven =

Metal band from Mumbai, India

Midhaven is a Metal band from Mumbai, India. Formed in 2011, Midhaven comprises Karan Kaul, Shreyas Rane, Abhishek Sawant and Viraj Saxena. Their music is diverse as they have a mixture of Clean and Harsh Vocal styles, Progressive/Sludge guitar play and Progressive Drums. They are currently signed to Universal Music Group (Universal Music India) and have launched two successful albums - 'Tales From The Tide E.P.' & 'Spellbound'. They are known for having songs with lyrically heavy concepts and stories.

== Formation and early years ==
Midhaven was formed in early 2011 with Karan Kaul on Guitar and Vocals, Abhishek Sawant on Bass Vocals, Shreyas Rane on Guitar and Aviraj Kumar on Drums. 'The band started writing new music from the minute we met' is what Kaul had to say about their first time in a practice space. Abhishek Sawant and Karan Kaul know each other from college, while Shreyas Rane was introduced to Abhishek by Karan. As 17-year-olds, they started making music while still attending HR College and KC College respectively. Most of their Music was very raw and lacked good production. They met Jordan Veigas, their current producer in 2011 and planned an E.P. in the coming years. Aviraj Kumar was introduced to the band by Karan Kaul, as he was in Karan's previous band 'Godhand'. 'At the time, Aviraj Kumar was a perfect fit for us.' states Kaul in an interview with a metal magazine in Mumbai. For a year after that, Midhaven went by the name 'Temple Smoke' as they were out of ideas.

== 2012-2013 Tales From The Tide E.P. ==
The band changed their name to 'Midhaven' which was derived from the astronomical term 'Midheaven'. After a year of being in the Indian Music Scene, Midhaven had progressed and were working with a new producer, Jordan Veigas, leaving Sahil 'The Demonstealer' Makhija's Demonic Studios. Jordan had given Midhaven a new sound with their new EP in progress as they hit the studio in December, 2012. The band finished recording in February, 2013 and were ready to launch their album. On May 5, 2013, Midhaven launched an E.P. titled 'Tales From The Tide' to much critical acclaim from fans. People loved their new sound and Progressive Metal influences but the band stated that this 'was just a tease' for what they had planned for the future. They had just started to build a fan base outside their own city, playing bigger venues with a wide range of audience. The E.P. had a fairly positive response as people were very interested in the lyrical stories and fiction of the E.P. album. Midhaven had already hinted that this was just a sneak preview or teaser to a much heavier and louder album in the works.

Tracks -

1. Tales From The Tide
2. The Third Eye
3. Whitewash

== 'Spellbound' & Signing with Universal Music India ==
In May 2013, Midhaven set up shop in JVMP (Jordan Veigas Music Productions) studio. In June 2013, Midhaven announce from their Facebook page stating that they are in the studio for a second time in the same year to record their latest album, yet untitled. Midhaven officially stepped into the studio in June 2013 with producer Jordan Veigas at Jordan Veigas Music Productions. They announced that they were making a much 'heavier' album. Then, in September, 2013, Midhaven announce that they had finished recording their new album now entitled 'Spellbound' and 'have something in store for the fans'. In November 2013, Midhaven signed with Universal Music India (under Universal Music Group), one of the largest Music Labels in the world. While in the studio, Midhaven decided to have Jordan, their producer, sing on one of the songs called Death Row

Midhaven were then on hiatus for 3 months until they had a press release in March, 2014, displaying their artwork, new photoshoot, etc. In March 2014, Midhaven announced that they were not active as their drummer Aviraj Kumar, had left the band for personal reasons. They soon recruited former Reverrse Polarity vocalist as their new drummer, Viraj Saxena, who had just come back from S.A.M. school of Music.

Their press release also informed the metal community about their signing to Universal Music India. 'Spellbound' was released worldwide under Universal Music India in physical and digital forms. Midhaven also released another press release about their album concept, stating it to be a hallucination of a man who, in the form of the Hindu God/Deity Shiva, kills the Greek Demigod Apollo.

1. Lunar Blessing
2. Seeking The Divine
3. Spellbound
4. Tales From The Tide (Re-recorded version)
5. Ascension
6. Fall Of Olympus
7. Third Eye (Re-recorded version)
8. Whitewash (Re-recorded version)
9. Death Row (featuring Jordan Veigas)

Midhaven's album 'Spellbound' has reviews from all over the country, including a 3.5 on 5 rating from Rolling Stone stating that 'Midhaven put their sloppy EP behind them with a louder and heavier album' The album got mixed reviews, with most reviews being positive ones.

== Band members ==
=== Current members ===
- Karan Kaul - Vocals, Guitar
- Aditya Mohanan - Vocals, Lead Guitar
- Aviraj Kumar - Drums

=== Former members ===
- Viraj Saxena - Drums (Sessions)
- Abhishek Sawant - Vocals, Bass
- Shreyas Rane - Guitar and other instruments (Keys, etc.)

== Discography ==
Title	Released	Format	Label
Tales From The Tide (EP)	May, 2013	CD, Digital	None
Spellbound	March, 2014	CD, Digital	Universal Music India (UMG)
Of The Lotus & The Thunderbolt	July, 2021	Digital	None

== See also ==
- Indian rock
- Kryptos (band)
- Bhayanak Maut
- Nicotine (band)
- Inner Sanctum (band)
- Demonic Resurrection
