= Sceptre (Indian band) =

Indian thrash metal band

- Origin: Mumbai, Maharashtra, India
- Genres: Thrash metal
- Years active: 1998 to present
- Label: Counter Culture Records
- Members: Gilroy Fernandes; Aniket Waghmode; Janus Sayal; Gary Gracious
- Website: http://sceptreindia.bandcamp.com/

Sceptre is an Indian thrash metal band formed in 1998, in Mumbai. They draw their prime influences from bands such as Slayer, Pantera, Sepultura and Lamb of God.

Its current members include Gilroy Fernandes on guitars, Aniket Waghmode on drums, Janus Sayal on bass and Gary Gracious on vocals

In the recent years the band portrayed their cause for fighting violence against women in their album Age of Calamity.

== Early years ==
Sceptre's original line up consisted of Teemeer, Amar Negi Aniket and Janus. Ajay Kumaran Vispy Homavazir, Amar Negi, Sanju Aguiar, Frank Pawar and Samron Jude are all ex-members of Sceptre. Gilroy formerly played in Naked Earth, before shifting to Sceptre. Through the years, Sceptre gained popularity by performing in various concerts, including Independence Rock.

== Discography ==
=== Sceptre ===
1) Nuclear 04:07
2) Revolution 04:55
3) Charred 03:55
4) Twilight's End

=== Now or Never ===
1) Oceans of Dreams 01:41
2) ...Incomplete 03:55
3) Nuclear 04:02
4) Now or Never 03:43
5) Enemy 04:52
6) Charred 03:41
7) Twilight's End 01:48
8) Quicksand 04:11
9) Search 05:20
10) Circles of Silence 03:23
11) Revolution 04:02

=== Age of Calamity ===
1) Solitude 01:28
2) Age of Calamity 04:05
3) Wrath of God 04:45
4) Prophesy Deceit 03:38
5) Lake of the Traitor 04:49
6) Fatal Delay 04:12
7) 7 Seals 04:19
8) Parasites (of the State) 03:29
9) Judgement Day (End - A New Beginning) 01:51
10) Lest We Forget (bonus track) 06:04

== See also ==
- Indian rock
- Kryptos (band)
- Bhayanak Maut
- Nicotine (band)
- Inner Sanctum (band)
- Demonic Resurrection
