= Millennium (Indian band) =

Indian heavy metal band

- Origin: Bangalore, India
- Genres: Heavy Metal
- Years active: 1988–2008
- Members: Vehrnon Ibrahim (vocals); Rohit Chaturvedi (lead guitar); Sharmon Ibrahim(rhythm guitar); Praful (bass); Deepak Raghu (drums)
- Past members: Rio (lead guitar); Cecil (lead guitar); Stanley (bass); Roberto (drums); Nader (drums); Malcolm (bass); Blake (guitar)

Millennium was an Indian metal band from Bangalore. The band was formed in 1988 as one of the first Indian metal bands.

== History ==
The band was created during 1988 with a line-up comprising lead vocalist Vehrnon Ibrahim, guitarists Rio and Cecil Soans, bass player Stanley with Roberto on the drums. Roberto left in 1999 and Rio's classmate Nader duly replaced him. 1991 brought about further line up changes as Malcolm superseded Stanley on the bass and Blake took over second guitars from Cecil. In 1997 Blake left for the U.K. Benjamin Yates filled in for two concerts on rhythm guitars. He was leaving for the U.S. and Sharmon, Vehrnon's brother took over as the permanent rhythm guitarist. After starting off with Iron Maiden covers at the Spirit of Iron Maiden Concert, the band released a 1992 single 'Peace Just In Heaven', the promotional video for which claimed the 'Skull Krusher of the week' award on India MTV's 'HeadBanger's Ball' show. Their limited edition EP, 'Born to Reign', sold out within a week of its release. Millennium also landed the honor of opening for Deep Purple. They also opened for No Doubt and released two albums. the first of which was from the Crescendo label and the second one was independently released.

After a long hiatus, Millennium were back performing live in March 2008, opening for Megadeth in Bangalore, India.

== Releases ==
Millennium have released three albums including the self-titled Millennium (1995) and One Concept To Live (1996).

== See also ==
- Indian rock
- Kryptos (band)
- Bhayanak Maut
- Nicotine (band)
- Inner Sanctum (band)
- Demonic Resurrection

== Sources ==
- Interview with Millennium at IndianMusicMug
