= Rock 'n India =

- Genre: Metal, rock
- Location(s): Bangalore, New Delhi
- Years active: 2008–2012
- Founders: DNA Networks
- Website: Official Website

Rock 'n India was an annual music festival organised by event management company DNA Networks. It was launched in 2008.

== 2008 ==
The first Rock 'n India festival was held on 14 March 2008.

Artists in Rock 'n India 2008
International	National
Machine Head; Megadeth	Thermal and a Quarter; Millennium; Junkyard Groove; Motherjane; Prestorika; Pentagram

== 2009 ==
Iron Maiden headlined the second festival on 15 February 2009.

Artists in Rock in India 2009
International	National
Iron Maiden; De Profundis; Lauren Harris; Brandon Ashley and The Silverbugs; Cyanide Serenity	Parikrama; Synaps; Kryptos; Abraxas; Slain

== 2010 ==
The headliners for Rock 'n India 2010 were the Backstreet Boys, Richard Marx, Jayce Lewis, Prime Circle.

Artists in Rock in India 2010
Delhi	Bangalore
Backstreet Boys; Richard Marx; Prime Circle; Jayce Lewis; Swarathma; Indigo Children	Backstreet Boys; Richard Marx; Prime Circle; Jayce Lewis; Swarathma

== 2011 ==
Rock 'n India 2011 took place in Bangalore on 30 October and was headlined by Metallica, supported by Biffy Clyro. This was Metallica's first performance in India. The Indian bands Guillotine and Inner Sanctum also performed. Attendance for the event was reported at around 29,000.

Artists in Rock in India 2011
International	National
Metallica; Biffy Clyro	Inner Sanctum; Guillotine
