= Bhosale (disambiguation) =

Bhosale is a prominent group within the Maratha clan system.

Bhosale may also refer to:

- Babasaheb Bhosale (1921–2007), Indian politician and freedom fighter who served as Chief Minister of Maharashtra
  - Bhosale ministry, cabinet of Maharashtra under Babasaheb Bhosale as Chief Minister
- Digvijay Bhonsale (born 1989), Indian singer, guitarist and songwriter
- Dilip Babasaheb Bhosale (born 1956), Indian jurist, Chief Justice of the High Court of Judicature at Allahabad
- Rohan Bhosale (born 1988), Indian cricketer
- Rupali Bhosale or Bhosle, Indian television actress
- Rutuja Bhosale (born 1996), Indian tennis player
- Sanket Bhosale (born 1988), Indian comedian
- Shivajirao Bhosale (1927–2010), Indian orator and thinker from Maharashtra
- Udayanraje Bhosale (born 1966), Indian politician, member of Lok Sabha from Satara Constituency in Maharashtra

== See also ==
- Jijabai, actually Jijabai Shahaji Bhosale
- Bhonsle (disambiguation)
- Bhosle (disambiguation)
