= Demonstealer =

Demonstealer may refer to:

- Demonstealer (gamebook), a Fighting Fantasy gamebook
- Demonstealer (album), a 2000 album by Demonic Resurrection
- Demonstealer Records, an independent record label based in Mumbai, India
