= Bhonsle (disambiguation) =

Bhonsle are a group within the Maratha clan system.

Bhonsle or its variants may also refer to:

- Anubha Bhonsle, Indian TV and print journalist, author
- Nagesh Bhonsle (also Bhosle or Bhosale), Indian film, television and theatre actor
- Digvijay Bhonsale (born 1989), Indian Rock/Metal singer, guitarist and songwriter
- Bhonsle (film), an Indian Hindi-language drama film

== See also ==
- Bhonsle kingdom, also known as Nagpur kingdom
- Bhosle (disambiguation)
- Bhosale (disambiguation)
