= Ayodhya Burns =

EP by Heathen Beast
- Released: 2010
- Genre: Black metal
- Label: Self-released

Heathen Beast chronology
Ayodhya Burns (2010)	The Drowning of the Elephant God (2012)

Professional ratings
Review scores
Source	Rating
Rolling Stone India	favorable
Rockfreaks	7/10
MTV Desi	favorable

Ayodhya Burns is the debut EP by the Indian black metal band Heathen Beast.

== Track listing ==
No.	Title	Length
1.	"Blind Faith"	5:13
2.	"Religious Genocide"	4:18
3.	"Ayodhya Burns"	5:02
