= A Darkness Descends =

Studio album by Demonic Resurrection
- Released: October 20, 2005
- Genres: Death metal, blackened death metal, symphonic metal, power metal
- Length: 60:48
- Label: Demonstealer Records

Demonic Resurrection chronology
Demonstealer (2000)	A Darkness Descends (2005)	Beyond the Darkness (2007)

A Darkness Descends is the second studio album by the Indian death metal band Demonic Resurrection. The album was released on October 20, 2005, through Demonstealer Records.

== Background ==
After the group disbanded in 2002, the Demonstealer was left to build it back up from scratch. The group was reformed in 2003 with a new-lineup consisting of Husain Bandukwala (bass), Mephisto (keyboards), JP (drums) and the Demonstealer (vocals, guitars). The band spent the next two years writing new material that reflected the change in lineup and each band member brought a different flavour to the music. The album also gave birth to Demonstealer Records, an independent extreme metal record label launched by the Demonstealer, which would go on to release albums of all the top Indian metal bands.

== Reception ==
Professional ratings
Review scores
Source	Rating
SputnikMusic	3.5/5 stars
Metal Storm	8/10

The album received mostly positive reviews from music critics. Review website SputnikMusic said "Demonic Resurrection balances the heaviness with the melody at an equal pace, never overpowering the other."

Reviewers also praised the production quality of the album. Heavy metal webzine Metal Storm said "each instrument sound quite good, and nothing is buried in the mix, like the amazing atmosphere that the keyboards create in "The Summoning", with a lousy production that detail would have gone bad."

== Track listing ==
No.	Title	Length
1.	"Prelude to Darkness" (Instrumental)	1:01
2.	"Dreams of the Dead"	4:59
3.	"Apocalyptic Dawn"	6:17
4.	"Behind the Mask of God"	4:37
5.	"Carnival of Depravity"	5:41
6.	"Spirits of the Mystic Mountains"	4:57
7.	"Where Shadows Lie"	6:44
8.	"A Darkness Descends"	5:37
9.	"Invoking the Demons"	3:58
10.	"Frozen Portrait"	7:11
11.	"The Summoning"	7:30
12.	"Overture to Glory" (Instrumental)	2:16

== Personnel ==
- Sahil 'Demonstealer' Makhija - lead vocals, rhythm guitar
- Husain Bandukwala - bass
- Mephisto - keyboards
- JP - drums
