= Spiral Ascent =

Studio album by Kryptos
- Released: June 25, 2004
- Genre: Heavy metal, thrash metal
- Length: 41:28
- Label: Clandestine Musick

Kryptos chronology
| Spiral Ascent (2004) | The Ark of Gemini (2008) |

Spiral Ascent is the debut album by Indian heavy metal band Kryptos. The album was released on June 25, 2004, through the band's mini label, Clandestine Musick.

Niklas Sundin of Dark Tranquillity designed the artwork for the album cover.

== Track listing ==
1. "Cursed Evolution" – 1:01
2. "Altered Destinies" – 6:20
3. "Forgotten Land of Ice" – 5:26
4. "Clandestine Elements" – 5:13
5. "In Twilight's Grace" – 7:50
6. "Expedition to Abnormalia" – 4:44
7. "Satyr Like Face" – 4:25
8. "Forsaken" – 6:01
9. "Descension" – 7:02
10. "Spiral Ascent" – 5:56

== Personnel ==
- Ganesh K – bass, vocals
- Nolan Lewis – guitar
- Akshay Patel – guitar
- Ryan Colaco – drums
