= Bhosle (disambiguation) =

Bhosle is a prominent group within the Maratha clan system.

Bhosle may refer to these people:

- Asha Bhosle (1933–2026), Indian playback singer
- Sudesh Bhosle (born 1960), Indian playback singer
- Varsha Bhosle (1956–2012), Indian singer, journalist and writer
- Vijay Bhosle (born 1937), Indian cricketer

== See also ==
- House of Bhonsle (Royal House), India
- Bhonsle (disambiguation)
- Bhosale (disambiguation)
