= The Ark of Gemini =

The Ark Of Gemini

Studio album by Kryptos
- Released: June 13, 2008
- Genres: Heavy metal, thrash metal
- Length: 40:34
- Label: Old School Metal

Kryptos chronology
Spiral Ascent (2004)	The Ark Of Gemini (2008)	The Coils of Apollyon (2012)

The Ark Of Gemini is the second album by Indian heavy metal band Kryptos. The album was released worldwide on June 13, 2008 through Old School Metal Records. Founding member and guitarist of the band, Nolan Lewis, takes over vocal duties for this album following the departure of original vocalist Ganesh K. The lyrics for the songs on album were written by Nolan Lewis, except for "Trident" which was written by Lewis and bassist, Jayawant Tewari.

The artwork and inner sleeves were designed by Prasad Bhat and Diwakar Das.

It was rated a 7 out of 10 by Rock Hard.

== Track listing ==
1. "Sphere VII" – 5:19
2. "Order of the D.N.A" – 2:45
3. "Heretic Supreme" – 4:49
4. "Tower of Illusions" – 6:18
5. "The Revenant" – 4:55
6. "Vulcan" – 6:23
7. "Trident" – 4:55
8. "Liquid Grave" – 4:19
9. "In The Presence of Eternity" – 2:52

== Personnel ==
- Nolan Lewis – guitar, vocals
- Rohit Chaturvedi – guitar
- Jayawant Tewari – bass
- Ryan Colaco – drums
