= The Return to Darkness =

Studio album by Demonic Resurrection
- Released: January 15, 2010 (India); July 12, 2010 (Worldwide)
- Genre: Death metal, blackened death metal, melodic death metal
- Length: 64:08
- Language: English
- Label: Demonstealer Records (Europe) (United States) Candlelight Records
- Producer: Sahil "The Demonstealer" Makhija

Demonic Resurrection chronology
Beyond the Darkness (2007)	The Return to Darkness (2010)

The Return to Darkness is the third full-length album by the Indian death metal band Demonic Resurrection. It was released on January 15, 2010, through Demonstealer Records. The band was signed to Candlelight Records for worldwide distribution. The album was released on Candlelight Records on July 12, 2010.

== Reception ==
Professional ratings
Review scores
Source	Rating
Sputnikmusic	4.5/5 stars
Ultimate Guitar	4/5 stars

The album has mostly received positive reviews. Critics have praised the band for improving upon their sound, stating, "...better production, tighter songwriting, better sounding symphonic elements and overall, a much more mature sound.". Critics also praised the atmosphere of the album. Some critics felt that the album was a touch derivative but nonetheless praised it for solid execution.

== Track listing ==
No.	Title	Length
1.	"Between Infinity and Oblivion"	02:00
2.	"Where Dreams and Darkness Unite"	06:00
3.	"The Warriors Return"	06:38
4.	"A Tragedy Befallen"	06:15
5.	"The Unrelenting Surge of Vengeance"	05:03
6.	"Bound by Blood, Fire and Stone"	05:19
7.	"Lord of Pestilence"	11:29
8.	"Dismembering the Fallen"	06:42
9.	"The Final Stand"	06:17
10.	"Omega, I"	08:31

== Personnel ==
- Sahil 'Demonstealer' Makhija - lead vocals, rhythm guitar, band leader
- Daniel Rego - lead guitar, backing vocals
- Husain Bandukwala - bass
- Mephisto - keyboards
- Virendra 'Viru' Kaith - drums

Additional Personnel

- Sahil 'Demonstealer' Makhija - producer
- Zorran Mendonsa - Mastering
