= The Coils of Apollyon =

Studio album by Kryptos
- Released: February 18, 2012 (India); September 21, 2012 (Worldwide)
- Genres: Heavy metal, thrash metal
- Length: 47:29
- Labels: Iron Fist (India); AFM (Worldwide)

Kryptos chronology
The Ark of Gemini (2008)	The Coils of Apollyon (2012)	Burn Up The Night (2016)

The Coils of Apollyon is the third studio album by the Indian heavy metal band Kryptos. The album was released in India on February 18, 2012 through Bangalore-based record label, Iron Fist Records. Internationally, the album was released on September 21, 2012 through AFM Records.

The album artwork was designed by renowned graphic artist Mark Riddick.

Professional ratings
Review scores
Source	Rating
Indian Music Revolution	8.5/10
Metal Forces Magazine	8/10
NME.in	favourable

== Track listing ==
No.	Title	Length
1.	"The Mask of Anubis"	04:30
2.	"The Coils of Apollyon"	04:09
3.	"Serpent Mage"	06:51
4.	"Nexus Legion"	05:23
5.	"Eternal Crimson Spires"	06:57
6.	"Spellcraft"	03:48
7.	"Starfall"	06:04
8.	"Visions of Dis"	08:10
9.	"The Isle of Voices" (Instrumental)	01:37

== Personnel ==
- Nolan Lewis – guitar, vocals
- Rohit Chaturvedi – guitar
- Jayawant Tewari – bass
- Ryan Colaco – drums

Additional personnel

- Mark Riddick – Artwork
- Anupam Roy – Mastering
