= Glass Duo =

Polish glass harpists

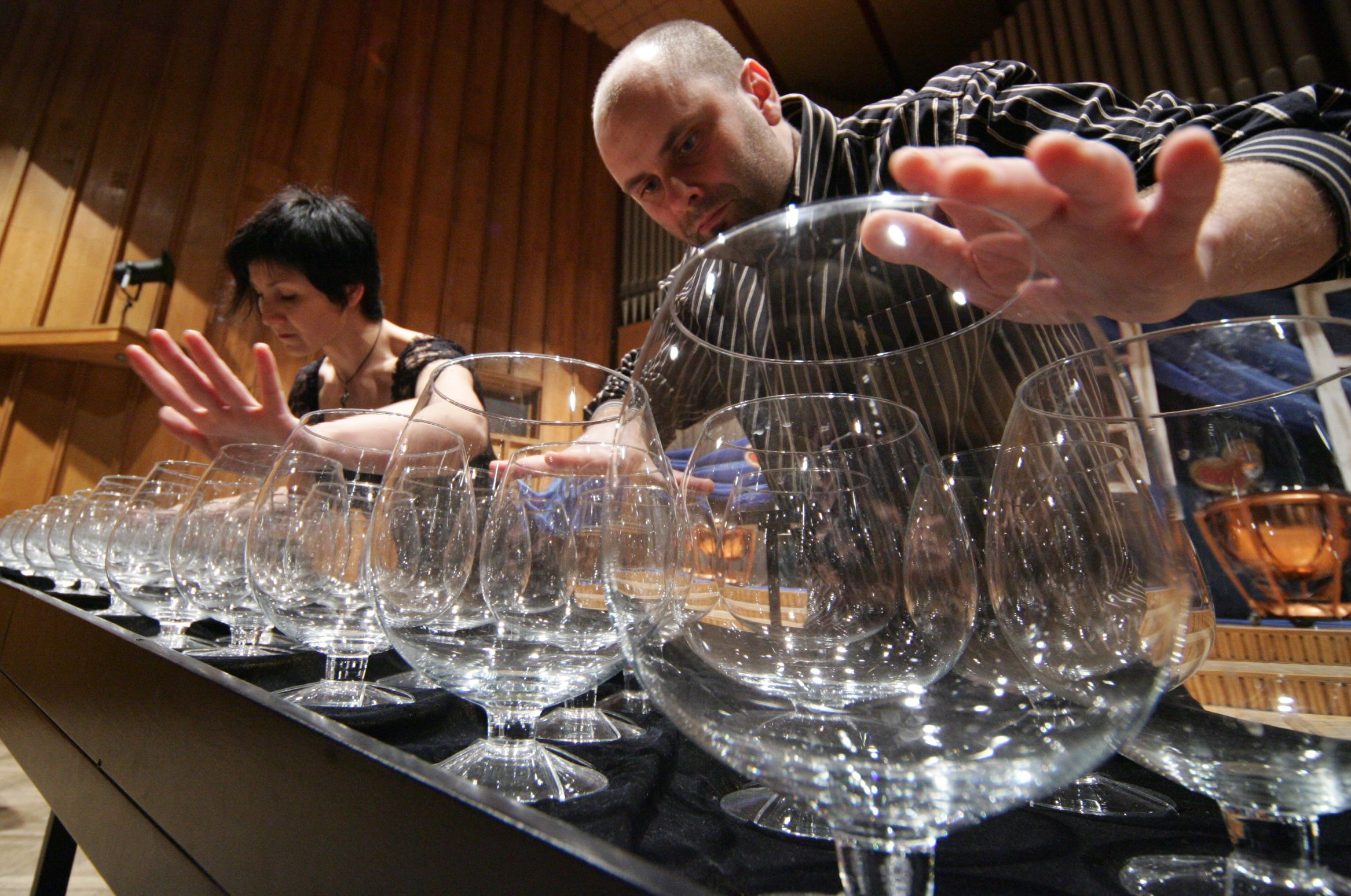
Glass Duo performing on their glass harp, Philharmonic Concert Hall, Olsztyn, Poland)

Glass Duo is a glass harp music group from Poland. Founded by Anna and Arkadiusz Szafraniec, they are the only glass harp music group in Poland, and one of few professional ensembles worldwide.

They perform both solo concerts and concerts with additional musicians. They have performed with string quartets, various chamber ensembles, even symphony orchestras. They have had several world premieres of musical works composed especially for them. They have also made numerous recordings for radio, TV and theatre productions.

== Notable performances ==
Glass Duo has performed at many festivals, e.g.

- Singapore Festival of Arts – Singapore
- altstadtherbst kulturfestival – Düsseldorf, Germany
- Internationaal Festival van Vlaanderen Gent – Belgium
- International Music Festival, Mood Indigo – Mumbai, India
- International Mozart Festival "Mozartiana" – Gdansk, Poland
- International Festival "Round About Chopin" – Vienna, Austria
- Klaipėda Music Spring – Lithuania
- Polish Harmonies Chopin & Beyond – Austin, US
- festival di Santo Stefano – Bologna, Italy
- La Folle Journee – Warsaw, Poland
- International Easter Music Festival "RESUREXIT" – Šiauliai, Lithuania
- Automne Musical de Marchienne" – Belgium
- Warsaw Autumn – Poland
- International Bach Festival "Bakhosluzheniye" – Kaliningrad, Russia
- Royal Concerts Chamber Ensemble Festival – Warsaw, Poland
- Days of Karol Szymanowski's Music – Zakopane, Poland
- International Festival "Percussion Solo and in a Band" – Poland
- International Classical Music Festival of Mažeikiai – Lithuania
