= Fire On Dawson =

German rock band

Fire on Dawson
- Origin: Karlsruhe, Germany]
- Genres: Neo-prog, progressive rock, alternative rock
- Years active: 2006–present
- Members: Ankur Batra; Markus Stricker; Martin Sonntag; Max Siegmund
- Past members: Nicolas Morales Ocampo, guitar (2005–07, 2009–10); Moritz Lietzenmayer, drums (2005–10)
- Website: fireondawson.com

Fire on Dawson is a German rock band from Karlsruhe, formed in 2006. The current line-up consists of Indian vocalist Ankur Batra, bassist Martin Sonntag, guitarist Markus Stricker and drummer Max Siegmund.

Since its formation, Fire on Dawson has released two full-length studio album ('Prognative' & '7 Billion and a Nameless Somebody') and one EP ' Seven Symptoms'. Though initially starting out as an experimental funk metal project, the band has over time developed a unique alternative/progressive rock sound, aided by the various musical and cultural influences the different band members have brought along with them. The sound of the band is characterised by their determination to not stick to one particular style which allows them to explore the entire spectrum. This, coupled with the vocal and lyrical ability of frontman Ankur Batra, has placed Fire on Dawson at the forefront of their genre in the European music scene.

Fire on Dawson's second full-length album, '7 Billion and a Nameless Somebody' (released on 31 July 2012), has been highly lauded worldwide, with many leading magazines and music journalists particularly impressed by the band's creativity and original sound. The release is the follow-up to the band's critically acclaimed debut album 'Prognative' (2010).

== History ==
=== Formation and the early years (2005-07) ===
In October 2005, friends Martin Sonntag and Moritz Lietzenmayer, who were studying at the University of Karlsruhe at the time, decided to start a band project to offer a release for their musicianship. They recruited Chilean-German guitarist Nicolas Morales Ocampo, introduced to them by a common friend, thereby completing the trio that was to be called 'Band Karlsruhe'. The initial direction the band project took was more towards crossover/funk rock/funk metal, due to Ocampo being heavily influenced by South American music.

After playing together for a few months, the trio decided to include a singer to the line-up. However, auditions to find a new frontman were at the time largely fruitless. The band then put up flyers at their University, which were noticed by a friend of Batra's. Batra, a mechanical engineering student at the university, was called up for an audition and the 18yr old managed to impress the band with his vocal skills, with some sources stating he delivered Staind's 'Outside', while others claiming that, Ankur, a longtime Dream Theater fan, performed the song 'Another Day' at the audition.

With the quartet complete, they set out to work on some new material. The addition of Batra, however, had marked the beginning of a gradual change in the musical direction of the band, towards a more alternative/grunge rock sound.

=== 'Fire on Dawson' (2007-08) ===
For the next year, the band was busy writing new songs with the aim of getting to perform them live. However, as the band members were all still students, they had to juggle their time between their studies and the band. In an interview Martin Sonntag stated, "We were all students at the time, enrolled in challenging courses at one of the most prestigious Universities in Europe. So naturally we also had other things on our mind than just music. The band for us, then, was just a way to hang out and have some fun. We hadn't really thought about music as a career at that point."

In early 2007, the band added Manuel Odendahl as a second guitarist to their line-up, mainly to give Ocampo more freedom to work on solos. Odendahl, also an electronic music DJ, had had experience with home recordings before and during his short tenure with the band, the band recorded its first 3 song-demo CD. Batra stated in a 2009 interview, "We had just recorded our first Demo and it was pretty darn exciting to listen to ourselves over the sound system. It obviously sounded like crap you know, it was our first recording ever. But we didn't care. It was our creation and we were proud."

Around this time, the band also came up with their name with Batra going on to say, "Actually we had already been thinking about what to call ourselves for a year and a bit more. Each of us decided to then come up with a list of names we thought as appropriate. We had about 500 ideas in there, but none really fit." The story goes that while cashing up after a night out drinking, Manuel, who had quit the band earlier that day to concentrate on his DJ career, pulled out a receipt from a restaurant in Dublin, Ireland called 'Fire' lying on Dawson Street. "Manu used to carry around tonnes of shit in his pockets. So while we were all done paying up that night, he was still taking out receipts and bills from months earlier. This one little piece of paper landed in front on us and it was from this restaurant. I think it summarized that period perfectly for us. The name was like his parting gift to us" said Sonntag.

Soon after playing their first gig as Fire on Dawson in August 2007, Ocampo, who had been the main songwriter till then, left the band due personal and musical reasons. Later that same year, Markus Stricker, an old schoolmate of Sonntag's, joined the band as lead guitarist. Stricker, who came from a more progressive/psychedelic rock background, was a major factor in redirecting the sound of the band towards a more progressive one, lengthening the existing songs and rewriting all the guitar solos in the process. This move also increased Batra's involvement in the songwriting process.

Together, the band then recorded their first EP titled 'Seven Symptoms', copies of which were mainly sold during concerts. The record did quite well in the underground music scene, with the EP getting sold out in the space of a few months.

=== Prognative (2009-11) ===
While touring Germany in support of their Debut EP, the band started saving up for a possible future release with Stricker stating that "While we were all content with what we had at the time, 7 Symptoms was still basically just a home recording. We wanted more, so we decided to save up, go to a studio and record a full length album. That became our next goal."

They then began working on new material for the album and in March 2009 entered the studio for the first time to start recording Prognative. When asked about the title of the album, Batra explained, "You know we always had problems explaining to people what kind of music we did. For us it was just music, something that was natural, but people somehow always needed a title, a label. We didn't want to give them something stale, that's why we came up with the name. For us, 'Prognative' defined the album perfectly. It kind of allowed us the freedom to write whatever we wanted, without worrying about expectations that usually go with genrelisation. It was our definition, so we started out on our terms."

After the album was recorded and mixed, it was sent to Hollywood for mastering by renowned sound engineer Stephen Marsh (mastering engineer). The band came to know of Marsh after watching the movie 'The Hangover' for which he had done the sound. They then contacted Marsh, not expecting him to be interested in a newcomer band. Marsh gave the band's music a listen and was impressed enough to get in touch with them immediately. "That was quite an exciting time for us! I mean this guy is a pro; he had done the sound for big guns like Incubus, Korn, Mudvayne etc. already. So for him to be interested in us was a big boost. It gave us tremendous confidence" said Stricker.

Fire on Dawson released 'Prognative' on 15 January 2010. The album quickly climbed the Myspace progressive rock charts in Germany, peaking at number 2 in the second week after its release. The band has consistently maintained its 'top 10' status in the charts ever since, a remarkable feat considering they were the only unsigned artists on the list. 'Prognative' also debuted at number 1 in the Indian rock charts on Myspace.

The album also received positive to very positive reviews from critics with reputed German magazine 'Valve' calling Prognative, "an album unexpectedly rich with ideas and dynamism that takes the listener away on a wonderfully realistic journey". Bloodchamber magazine went on to state that, "With their debut, Fire on Dawson offer a contemplative and pensive piece, comparable to the genius of yesteryear". Renowned online magazine, metal.de complimented the band and their insistence on authenticity and defiance of the party-alternative/indie rock wave that had taken over the youth of Germany. Critics also lauded the band members' individual skills on their respective instruments.

After the release, Fire on Dawson began touring Germany in support of their album. During this period, Lietzenmeyer parted ways with the band and was replaced by Max Siegmund for the remaining leg of the tour. The band undertook its first major international tour later the same year, a 3-month journey through Batra's homeland India. On their first international tour, Fire on Dawson played to huge masses of audiences, creating a viral buzz in the entire rock-listening community in South Asia.

=== 7 Billion and a Nameless Somebody (2012-current) ===
During the band's inaugural tour to the Indian subcontinent, the band members were using their spare time on the road to work on new ideas. It was this time period where the band started flirting with the idea of a second album. After the band returned from the Indian tour, Max Siegmund joined the band full-time as their fixed drummer. The album was written over a period of 7 months with the band abstaining from any live concerts during this period to fully concentrate on the album. '7 Billion and a Nameless Somebody' was released on 31 July 2012 with the CD Release shows being held on consecutive days at the Hard Rock Cafe in Warsaw, Poland and at the Hard Rock Cafe in Prague, Czech Republic. In support of the release of the album, the band spent 2012/13 touring Europe combined with a series of headlining shows at various Western European Festivals including the prestigious Staatsforsten Open Air in Germany. '7 Billion and a Nameless Somebody' scored an average rating of 82% based on reviews from over 60 music magazines across Europe and North America.

== Influences and style ==
Fire on Dawson's style had usually been described as alternative rock or post grunge with progressive influences rather than all out progressive rock up till the release of 7 Billion and a Nameless Somebody. Upon the release of the band's debut album 'Prognative', Sonntag stated in an interview "That's always been the case I guess. The alternative guys have been saying we are too experimental whereas for the progressive fans we were too mainstream. But these things have never really bothered us. We want to explore the whole spectrum and that allows us to put stuff like Olives and Won by One on the same album without any apprehension". Their second album is, however, widely acknowledged as being more progressive and experimental in nature with subtle jazz elements and multi-rhythmic undertones laced across the piece.

Another important aspect of Fire on Dawson's music is the lyrics which are usually centered around various social themes. Batra, who is the sole lyricist in the band explains, "For me personally, the lyrics are the most essential part of a song. You can have a great piece, with brilliant arrangement but if the words don't convey the message, it's all a waste. And in my opinion, it's necessary to talk about certain stuff that's plaguing us today because I seriously don't see how a high school crush can be of more relevance than poverty"

== Discography ==
- Seven Symptoms EP (2007)
- Prognative (2010)
- 7 Billion and a Nameless Somebody (2012)

== Members ==
- Ankur Batra, lead vocals, lyrics, acoustic guitar (2006–present)
- Markus Stricker, lead guitar (2007–present)
- Martin Sonntag, bass guitar (2006–present)
- Max Siegmund, drums (2011–present)
