= Antaragni (band) =

- Origin: Bangalore, Karnataka, India
- Genres: Indian fusion
- Years active: 1998–2004
- Members: Raghupathy Dixit (vocals/guitar); Manoj George (violin); Alwyn Fernandes (lead guitar); Josy John (bass); Gopinath (percussion)
- Past members: H.N. Bhaskar (violin); Ravichandra Rao (flute/kanjira)

Antaragni was a fusion band from Bangalore which disbanded in 2004. Antaragni's repertoire included an amalgamation of Indian Classical, folk and Western rock, funk, pop and country.

After Antaragni disbanded, the band's frontman, Raghupathy Dixit went on to form The Raghu Dixit Project, which he likes to refer to as an open house for musicians and artistes from different genres to come together, collaborate and create a dynamic sound and expression.

== Etymology ==
The name Antaragni is a union of two Sanskrit words — antar meaning 'within' and agni meaning fire. Put together, they form 'Antar Ki Agni' or 'Antaragni' for short, literally meaning 'the fire within'. The name of the band reflected the passion and zeal of its members for music.

== History ==
=== Early years ===
Antaragni, which went on to become one of Bangalore's most popular music acts, was formed sometime in the late 1990s by guitarist/songwriter/singer Raghupathy Dixit. An experimentalist constantly in search of a new sound, Raghu hit it off with talented violin player H.N. Bhaskar. Together the duo formed Antaragni. Armed with a new sound, Raghu and Bhaskar moved base to Bangalore, where they started making waves. They met Ravichandra Rao, a flautist and percussionist of repute, and their music continued to evolve. By concocting a potpourri of Indian classical, folk and western undertones, Antaragni began to rock Bangalore.

=== Take two ===
In Bangalore, Raghu met Manoj George, a violinist trained in western classical music. Together, Raghu, Manoj George and Bhaskar started churning out some delightfully refreshing music strongly laced with Indian folk influences. The two violinists trained in different styles added slick musical tussles (known as jugalbandi) to the songs, and it seemed the band had two lead violinists, instead of the conventional lead guitarist. The band's fame continued to grow as it won competitions across the country with a voracious appetite. The most notable being winning the Radio City competition to be crowned the best band in Bangalore. Their first major tryst with fame however came when they were invited to open for Bryan Adams when he came to town, before a crowd of 30,000. Antaragni had arrived.

Unfortunately, the priorities of Ravi and Bhaskar as professional musicians differed from that of Raghu and they made their silent exits.

=== Final bow ===
Raghu and Manoj George continued performing with guest artists until they finally disbanded in 2004.
