= Parvaaz (band) =

Musical ensemble

- Origin: Bengaluru, Karnataka, India
- Genres: Progressive rock, Alternative Rock, Folk rock
- Years active: 2010–present
- Members: Khalid Ahmed; Fidel Dsouza; Sachin Banandur; Bharath Kashyap
- Past members: Kashif Iqbal; Niel Simon; Adarsh Deokata; Somarashi Bhattacharjee
- Website: parvaazmusic.com

Parvaaz is an Indian rock band formed in 2010 in Bangalore by Kashif Iqbal and Khalid Ahamed. The present line up (since 2021) features Khalid Ahamed (vocals), Fidel Dsouza (bass), Bharath Kashyap (lead guitars) and Sachin Banandur (drums and percussion).

Parvaaz released their first single Dil Khush in 2011 followed by their five-track debut E.P Behosh in 2012. Their second single Khufiya Dastaan was released in 2013. Their debut album Baran was released in August 2014 with eight tracks. In 2016 they released a live feature length album Transitions that contains previously recorded tracks and two additional tracks Shaad and Colour White (both later released as singles in 2017). The group released their nine-track album Kun on 18 October 2019. Kashif Iqbal left the band in 2021

== History ==
=== Early years and formation (2010–2014) ===
Khalid Ahamed and Kashif Iqbal formed the band while in college with the initial lineup comprising Neil Simon (bass), Adarsh Deokota (rhythm guitar) and Somarashi Bhattacharjee (drums).

With its initial line up, Parvaaz won a string of college level competitions in 2010. It was around this time that Sachin Banandur took over on drums. Banandur had been playing for the Bangalore-based band Insane. After the release of their first single Dil Khush the group went on tour through India playing at many popular music festivals. In the course of recording a new song in 2011(which was later scrapped) Neil Simon left the group and was later replaced by Fidel D'Souza from the jazz band Bourbon Street.

Khufiya Daastan was released as a single in 2013.

=== Baran (2014) ===
Parvaaz independently released their first full-length studio album Baran. The eight-track album was recorded and mixed at the Nathaniel Production House in Bangalore with engineer Jason Zachariah. Rolling Stone India noted the album's 13-minute title track is said to showcase the band's 'moody and progressive leaning sound'.

The album included guest musicians who contributed to a few tracks. Sanjeev Naik from Swarathma played violin on Ab Ki Yeh Subah and Saxophone player Seth Molloy featured on Fitnah and Ziyankar. Other collaborating artists included guitarist Ramanan Chandramouli from Blushing Satellite and guitarist Michael Anthony Dias from Mad Orange Fireworks.

=== Emergence (2015–2016) ===
Parvaaz won the Toto Funds the Arts Awards for Music in early 2015 for their Album Baran.

Soon after, the band performed at the Emerge Festival held in Bangalore on 28 Feb, 2015.

In 2016 Parvaaz won the Sennheiser Top 50, a nationwide band hunt whose grand finale was held in Mumbai. Rolling Stone India wrote: "Parvaaz, whose performance was nothing short of breathtaking... Vocalist Khalid Ahamed’s plaintive vocals cast a spell on the young college-goer crowd that watched the band’s entire set with the rapt, disciplined attention of an operatic audience. Parvaaz performed songs off their 2014 LP Baran, such as Roz Roz and Beparwah. With their unique mix of rich lyrical content comprising Hindi, Urdu and Kashmiri underlaid with a bed of robust guitar work, it was no wonder that the band went on to win the competition."

In 2016 Parvaaz contributed music to the National Award-winning film Soz. The film won the Best Debut Film at the 64th National Film Awards.

=== Transitions (2016) ===
In July 2015, Parvaaz co-produced their first feature length concert film/live album Transitions shot at the Jagriti Theatre, Bangalore, India. The 90-minute concert was released in 2016 and was conceived, directed and co-produced by Bangalore-based filmmaker Gokul Chakravarthy. Baran collaborator Sanjeev Naik (Violin), Rauf Abdul from Ministry Of Blues (Keyboards) and singer Alexis D’Souza also participated in this performance. The album was released on YouTube. The album was featured on MTV Indies and aired in 3 episodes

=== Rolling Stone hot list, Shaad and Colour White (2016–2017) ===
In December 2016 Parvaaz was featured in Rolling Stone India's 2016 hot list. Parvaaz released their first video single Shaad on YouTube in April 2017.

In May 2017, Parvaaz released the music video for their single Colour White on YouTube. The concept and direction for the video was done by Parvaaz. The video was edited by drummer Sachin Banandur. The track was recorded and mixed by Parvaaz's live sound engineer Rahul Ranganath at Monohive and Third Eye Studios, Bangalore.

=== A Rooted Departure and Rolling Stone cover (2017–present) ===
In August 2017 Parvaaz went on their first international tour to Canada. Among other venues they played at the Monster Rock Orchestra in Brampton, The Harbourfront Summer Festival, Small World Music and at the Panorama India Day festival in Toronto's Nathan Phillips Square.

Parvaaz was featured on the cover of Rolling Stone India in their May 2018 edition where they said: "There's no denying Parvaaz enjoy an unexampled spot in Indian indie. Their music is unmistakable, idiosyncratic, cinematic, and there’s no other band that sounds anything like them. Try labeling their music and chances are you'll struggle."

Director Kushal Srivastava used Parvaaz's Beparwah as a soundtrack in his 2018 film Vodka Diaries.

In March 2018 Parvaaz won the Radio City Freedom Jury's Choice Awards for Best Rock Artists.

== Band members ==
=== Current ===
- Khalid Ahamed – Co-founder, Lead Vocals, Rhythm Guitar, Lyricist, Co-Composer (2010–present)
- Sachin Banandur – Drums, Percussion, Backing vocals, Co-Composer (2010–present)
- Fidel Dsouza – Bass, Percussion, Backing vocals, Co-Composer (2011–present)
- Bharath Kashyap - Lead Guitars (2021–present)

=== Former ===
- Mir Kashif Iqbal - Co-founder, Lead Guitarist, Lyricist, Co-Composer, Backing Vocals (2010 - 2021)
- Neil Simon – Bass (2010–2011)
- Adarsh Deokota – Guitars (2010)
- Somarashi Bhattacharjee – Drums (2010)

== Discography ==
=== Albums ===
- Behosh EP (2012)
- Baran (2014)
- Transitions (2016)
- Kun (2019)

=== Singles ===
- Khufiyan Dastaan (2013)
- Shaad (2017)
- Colour White (2017)

== Filmography ==
- Soz - A Ballad Of Maladies (2016)
- Vodka Diaries (2017)
