= Victor Rubilar =

Personal information
- Birth name: Victor Hugo Rubilar Panasiuk
- Born: 24 July; Buenos Aires, Argentina
- Website: www.victorrubilar.com

Victor Rubilar is an Argentinian professional football performer and comedian based in Spain. He is an official Guinness World Record Holder. He worked as a magician for three years in Argentina before he decided to become a professional football freestyler / football juggler. He moved from Argentina to Sweden to study at the school of contemporary arts in Cirkus Cirkör. He specialized in football freestyling, football juggling and acrobatics. He was also educated in the arts of performing, theatre and dance.

== National Swedish Touring Theatre ==
After he finished his education he worked at the National Swedish Touring Theatre as a main character in a football show touring 6 months around Sweden. He performed "En Liten Föreställning om Fotboll" in over 40 cities all over Sweden.

== Guinness World Records ==
In January 2018 Victor Rubilar broke the Guinness World Record of the most R.A.F (rolls of a football around the face) in one minute. The record was set live on a Spanish TV Program Luar and he managed to 40 R.A.F in one minute. Making it of a speed of one R.A.F every 1,5 seconds. He broke his own record that was set in October 2013 at the Maltepe Park Mall in Istanbul, Turkey. The original record was of 35 R.A.F in one minute. In 2007, he broke three Guinness World Records in one day. The records he broke are "The most rolls of a football from temple to temple" (42), "The most footballs juggled" (5) and "The longest time to spin a football on the forehead" (19.96 seconds). In 2008, he broke the record of "The most rolls of a football from temple to temple" again. This time he did 67. Also he broke a new world record of "The longest distance travelled while balancing a ball on the forehead" (278 meters). Victor Rubilar has been featured on the Guinness Book of records in 2008 and 2009. In 2010 Victor Rubilar set a new world record of "The most consecutive football rolls across the forehead". He did 581 at Cicerellos Fish 'n' Chips in Fremantle, Western Australia, Australia, on 1 April 2010.

== Freestyle show ==
Rubilar specializes in mixing football freestyle and football juggling skills with dance, acrobatics and comedy. During his career he has taken part in commercials for Coca-Cola. His shows are known for combining football freestyle skills with juggling tricks with three and five footballs. He did a show for Puma in Germany with the football star Pele, at the finals of the French league in front of 80.000 people at the Stade de France Stadium. He has performed with Adidas in a Scandinavia tour, with Puma in Switzerland during the Euro Cup 2008. Since the start of his career he has performed in over 30 countries in over 150 different cities all over the world. He performs between 100 and 200 shows in around 10–15 different countries per year.

== Rampljuset ==
In 2009 Victor Rubilar was competing on a Swedish TV Talent show where he won the title of "The performer of the year".

== Comedy show ==
One of Rubilar's specialties is comedy shows. Circus Super Star is the name of his latest show. He developed this show in Argentina in 2007. This is a 45-minute comedy show.

== TV appearances ==
In 2018 Victor Rubilar did an appearance on the TV Show Luar where he broke a Guinness World Record Live. In 2017 Victor Rubilar appeared on the TV Show Luar and during the same year he did a performance in Saudi Arabia in front of the Prince of Saudi Arabia Mohammad bin Salman. In 2007 Victor participated on the Swedish competition show Talang. In 2009, he won the Swedish TV talent show Rampljuset. In 2010, he broke the Guinness World Record of the most R.A.F in a minute live on Yetenek Sizsiniz Türkiye (the Turkish version of the TV program "America's Got Talent").

== Other awards ==
Victor Rubilar has won the most consecutive festivals in the world between 2011 and 2012, seven consecutive awards in three continents.
