= Digvijay Bhonsale =

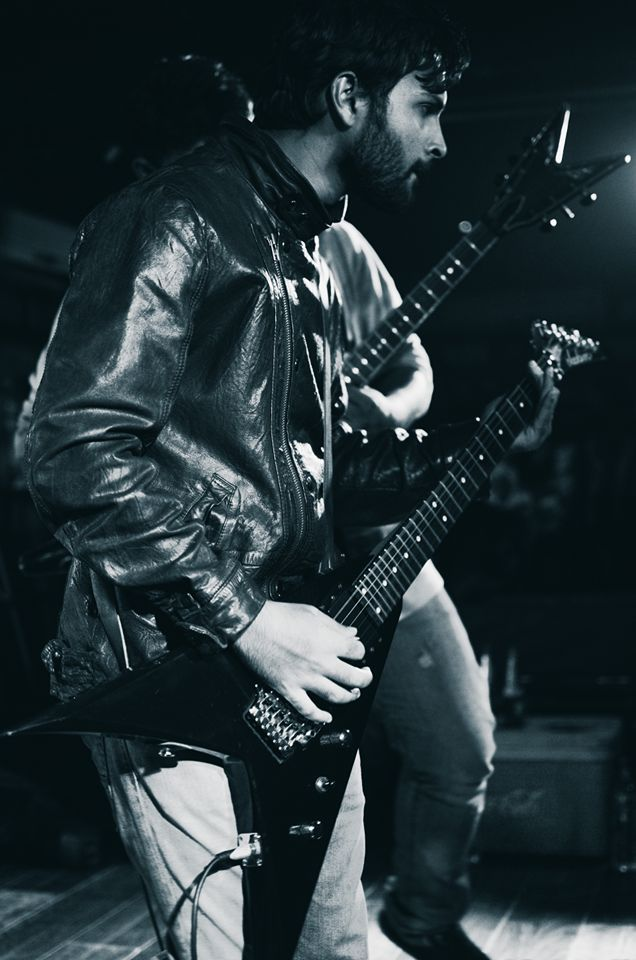
- Digvijay Bhonsale performing live at the 10th Anniversary Gig of Nicotine at O2 in Indore, December, 2016.

Background information
- Born: Digvijay Bhonsale; 31 March 1989 (age 37); Mumbai, Maharashtra, India
- Genres: Heavy metal; hard rock; acoustic
- Occupations: Singer, guitarist, songwriter
- Instruments: Vocals, guitar
- Years active: 2006–present
- Website: instagram.com/digvijaybhonsale; instagram.com/digvijaymusic

Digvijay Bhonsale (born 31 March 1989) is an Indian rock and metal vocalist, guitarist and songwriter.

He is best known as the front-man of Nicotine, the first metal band from Indore described as "pioneers of Metal music in Central India".

Bhonsale was born in Bombay and raised in Indore. He was educated at the Daly College. He completed his Bachelor of Business Administration from PIMR (Devi Ahilya University) and his Master of Business Administration from Cardiff Metropolitan University in Wales, United Kingdom.

His great great grandfather moved from Barshi (Maharashtra), to Gwalior State and later settled in Dewas Junior State, where he and his descendants held a hereditary noble position called 'Mankari', in the state's durbar.

As well as performing with his band, he has also performed several times in Cardiff as a solo musician where he lived from 2010 to 2012.

In 2017 he moved to Harare, Zimbabwe and played several solo acoustic gigs at Jam Tree, Queen of Hearts, Amanzi and Corky's.

He collaborated with the members of the band Evicted, and played alongside Dividing The Element, Acid Tears, and Chikwata-263 at the 2018 Zimbabwean edition of the 'Metal United World Wide' concert at the Reps Theatre in Harare.

Bhonsale cites his influences as Nirvana, Incubus, Chevelle and Rage Against the Machine.

== Equipment ==
- Jackson King V Electric Guitar
- Fender Jaguar Kurt Cobain Signature Electric Guitar
- Line 6 Pod X3 Live Multieffects Guitar Processor
- Dunlop DB01 Dimebag Darrell Signature Cry Baby Wah Pedal
- Blackstar ID Core Amp
- Ibanez Dreadnaught Acoustic Guitar
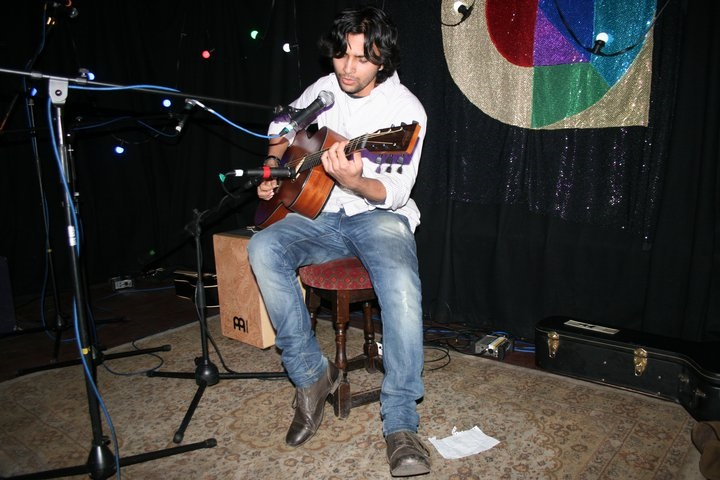
Digvijay Bhonsale Live at 'No Sweat', Cardiff Arts Institute, Wales, UK, 2011.

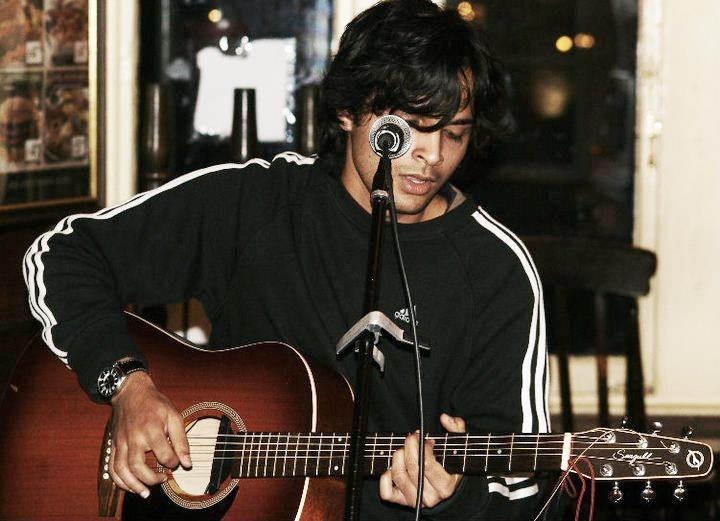
Live at the Pen n Wig in Cardiff, Wales, UK in 2011.

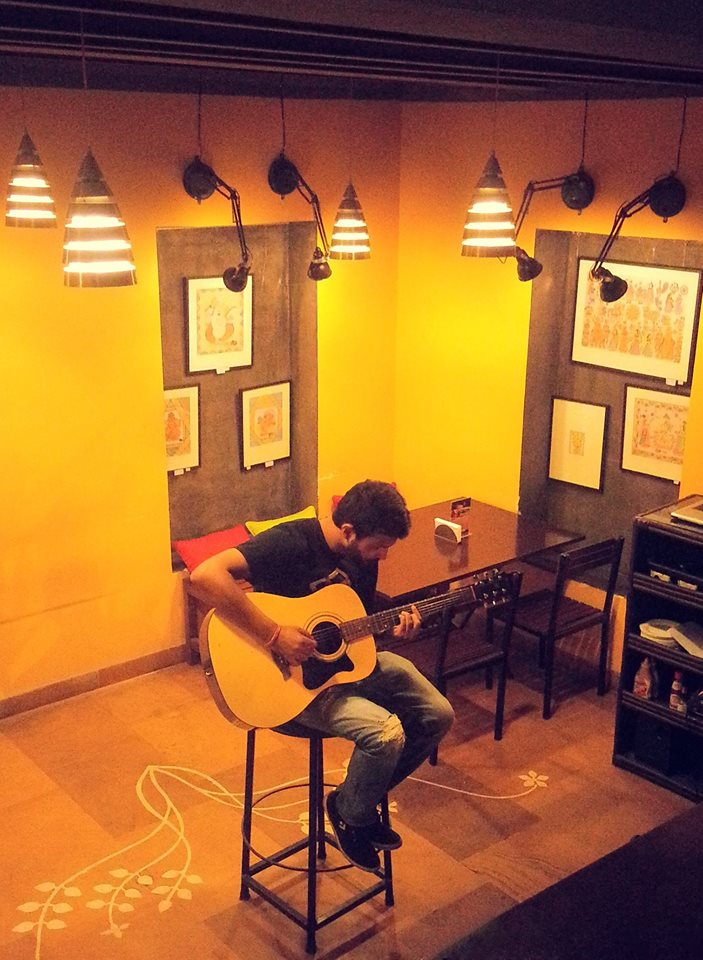
Live at Kuzart Lane, in New Delhi, India, in 2014.

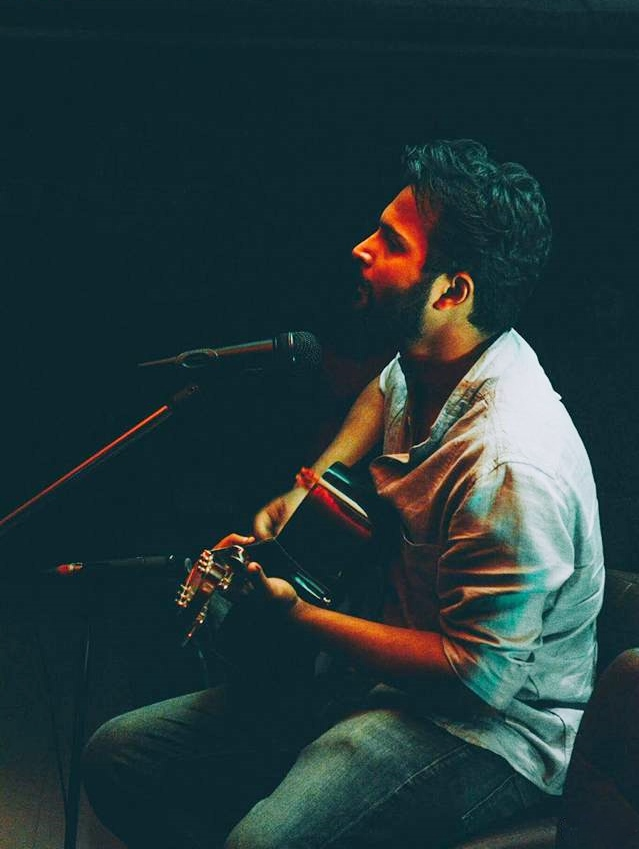
Live at Woodstock Lounge in Indore, India, in 2015.

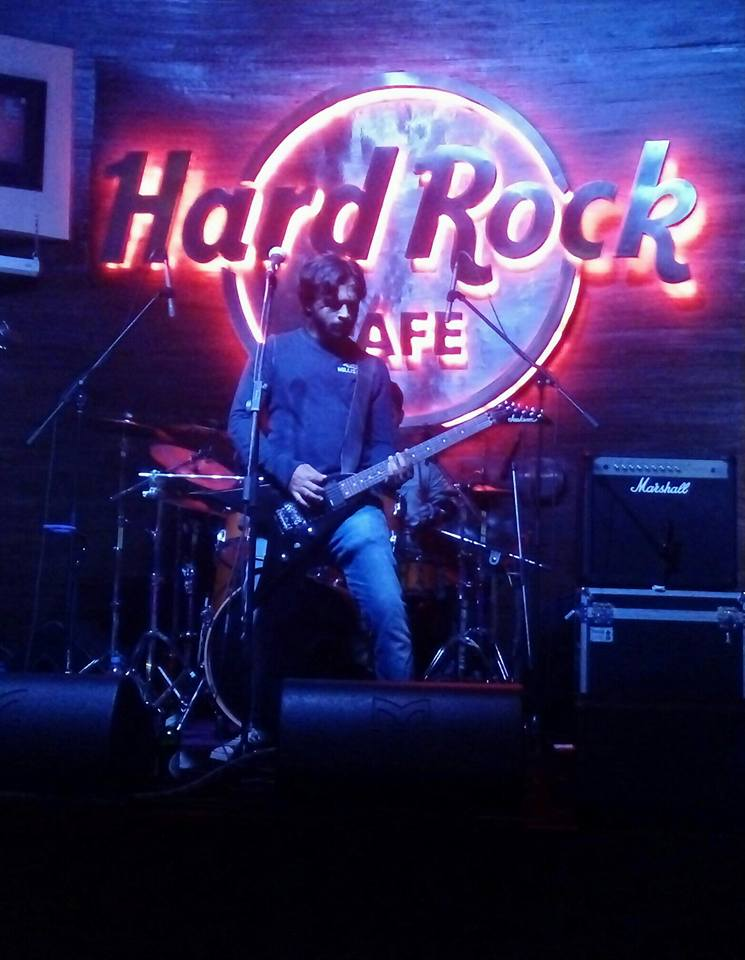
Live with Nicotine at the Hard Rock Cafe in Hyderabad, India, in 2016.

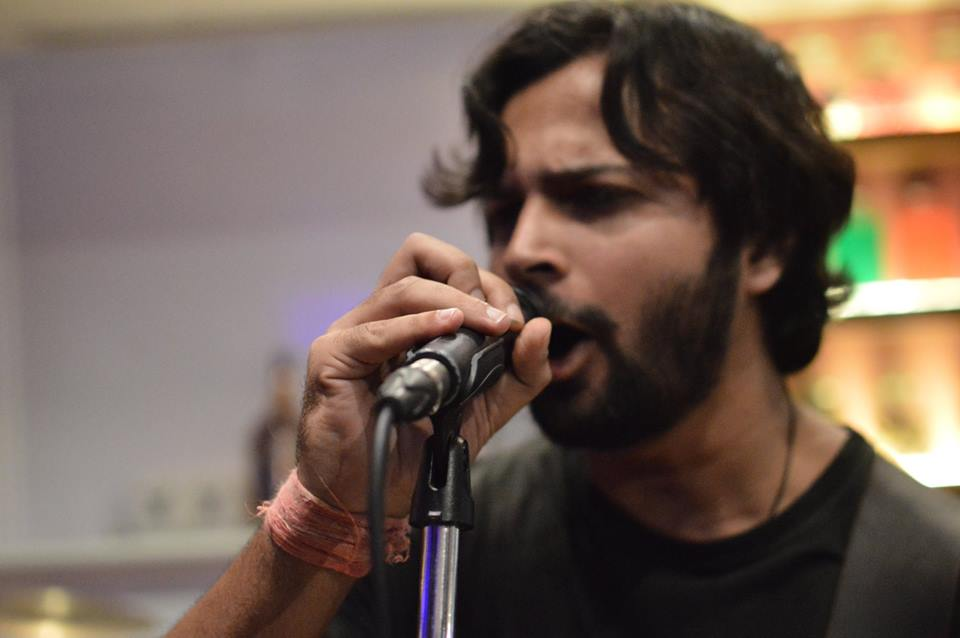
Live with Nicotine at Rockville in Mumbai, India, in 2016.

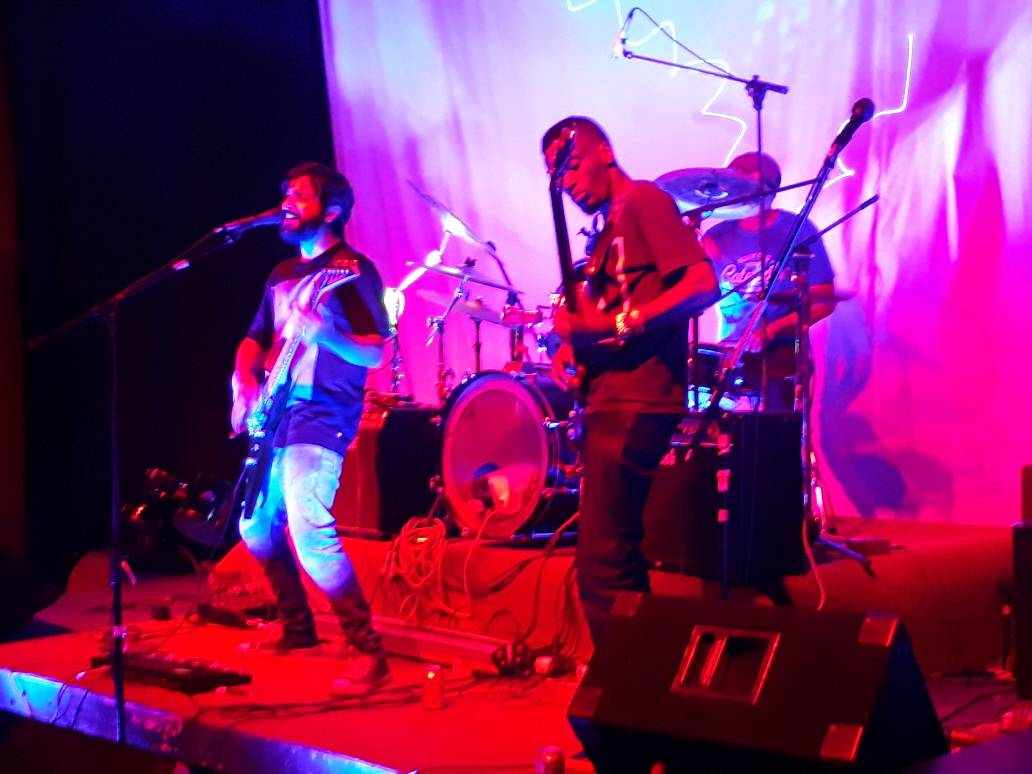
Live at the Zimbabwean edition of 'The Metal United World Wide' concert at the Reps Theatre, Harare, in 2018.

== See also ==
- Indian rock
