= Thermal and a Quarter =

Indian rock band

- Also known as: TAAQ
- Origin: Bangalore, Karnataka India
- Genres: Rock; Indian rock; progressive rock; blues rock
- Years active: 1996–present
- Members: Bruce Lee Mani; Rajeev Rajagopal; Leslie Charles; Tony Das
- Website: https://www.thermalandaquarter.com/

Thermal and a Quarter (often abbreviated as TAAQ) are a rock band from Bangalore, India. Formed in 1996, they describe their music as "Bangalore rock" - rooted in a classic rock idiom while Indian in "subtle, inescapable ways". TAAQ had released seven studio albums by their 20th anniversary in 2016 with an eighth released in 2020.

The band is composed of three Malayalis (known colloquially as Mallus) and one member with 1/4th Malayali ancestry, hence the name Thermal (Three-Mallus) and a Quarter (Quarter Mallu)

== Show openers ==
TAAQ opened the show for Deep Purple in 2001, when they performed in Bangalore. The band also opened for Guns N' Roses in 2012.

== Band members ==
The current members of TAAQ are:

- Bruce Lee Mani (guitar and vocals)
- Rajeev Rajagopal (drums)
- Leslie Charles (bass) and
- Tony Das (guitar).

== Discography ==
The albums released by the band included

- Thermal and a Quarter (2000)
- Jupiter Café (2002)
- Plan B (2005)
- This Is It (2008)
- 3 Wheels 9 Lives (2012)
- The Scene (2015)
- No Wall Too High (2015)
- A World Gone Mad (2020)

== Awards and honours ==
TAAQ was featured on The WorldSpace Honours 2007 for their outstanding contributions to Indian rock scene with interviews with other Indian band members, an extensive play-through of their work by RJ Hari, and an Interview with the band themselves about "10 years of TAAQ".

Mani won Guitarist of the Year at the Jack Daniels Rock Awards in 2009 and 2012. He also won the "Leon Ireland Outstanding Vocalist Award" at JRO 2011.

== Music School ==
In 2010, TAAQ opened a music school in Koramangala, Bangalore, called the "Taaqademy". A branch in Whitefield was opened in 2014.
