= Bhayanak Maut =

Indian metal band

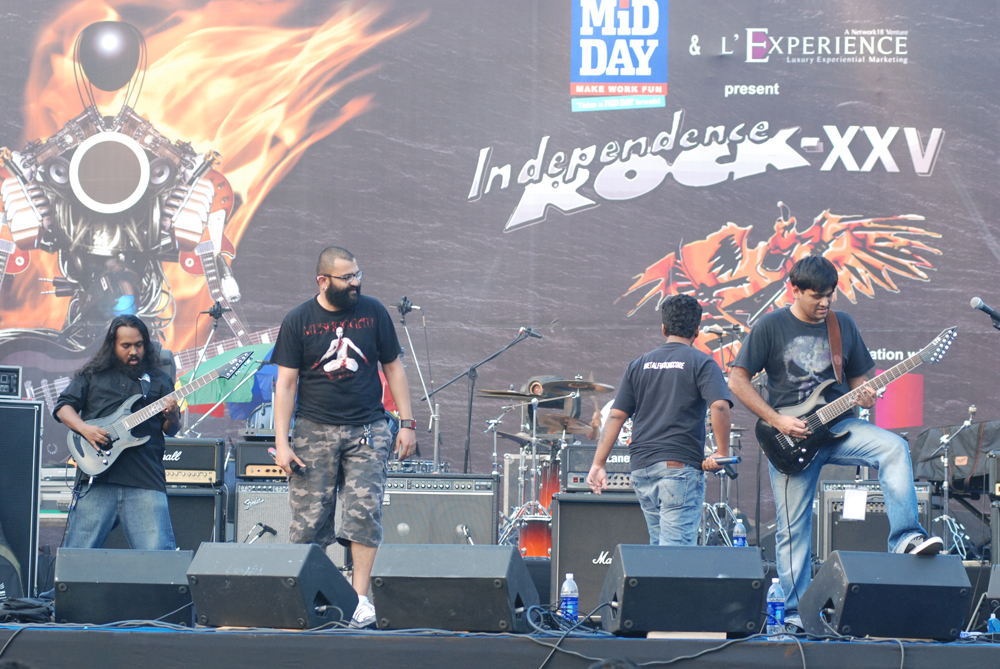
- Bhayanak Maut performing at the 2010 Independence Rock XXV

Background information
- Origin: Mumbai, India
- Genres: Groove metal, deathcore
- Years active: 2003-present
- Label: Independent Artist
- Members: Aman Virdi; Rahul Hariharan; R. Venkatraman (Baba); Aditya Gopinathan Nair (Amidtsya); Ishaan Krishna; Aniket Wankhade (Anny)
- Past members: Jaison Lewis; Sriram Sharma; Jai Row Kavi; Vinit Bharucha; Sidharth Kadadi; Vinay Venkatesh; Sunneith Revankar

Bhayanak Maut is an Indian metal band from Mumbai. The band's name was inspired by a B-Grade Hindi horror movie of the same name, which translates to "Horrific Death".

== History ==
Bhayanak Maut formed in November 2003. The band was formed and named by Jaison and Sriram who recruited several members including Sera Kattoua Aman, Ravi Balakrishnan, R.Venkatraman and Rahul Hariharan to join the band. R.Venkatraman is the only remaining member of the original lineup. The band released their third full-length album "MAN" on 31 October 2014.

== Performances ==
Bhayanak Maut (or BM for short as it is known as among its fans) has played at college fests such as Oasis-BITS Pilani, RAIT Horizons, IIT Chennai – Saarang (Finalists), NLS Bangalore's Strawberry Fields, and Goa's Waves Festival. The band also had numerous gigs at venues like Cyclone, Pune. They played at the first gig at Razzberry Rhinoceros and second at SIES Sion college festival. However, the first gig with Vinay as the front man was JRO 2004 and they also came third at Blitzkrieg 2004 – the IIT Delhi competition. Another highlight in the band's career has been playing at GIR in 2007 in New Delhi alongside Norwegian band, Enslaved.

Their biggest break yet came in 2007 when they reached the finals of Garnier Fructis presents Channel V Launchpad live at Hard Rock Café, held at Pragati Maidan in New Delhi. In November 2008, Bhayanak Maut played on stage at the Great Indian Rock (GIR) show at Mumbai alongside Satyricon and Sahg, and received good reviews for their performance in GIR Shillong.

Jai Row Kavi took over as Bhayanak Maut's drummer in August 2009 as Rahul Hariharan decided to take a year off and complete his master's degree in the UK.

With Jai filling in for Rahul, Bhayanak Maut played at GIR 2009 in Pune and Delhi sharing stage with Norway's Benea Reach. On 5 December 2009, Bhayanak Maut shared the stage with Holland's Textures and Sweden's Amon Amarth at Deccan Rock 2009 in Bangalore, India.

In early 2010, vocalist Vinay Venkatesh decided to only work with the band on their studio projects; however he returned to the band full-time after a month-long hiatus.

Rahul Hariharan returned to India in October and the Band released its second EP, Metastasis, which was released on 20 October 2010.

Vinay Venkatesh and Sunnieth Revankar, also known as the Guttural Twins decided to quit the band after their performance at the NH7 Weekender 2017, Meghalaya for personal reasons.

In April 2019, after a 1-year hiatus, Bhayanak Maut became active again and recruited a new vocalist, Aman Virdi from Noiseware.

The band performed at the Inferno Festival 2011 Oslo, Norway, where they shared the stage with big names such as Today is the Day and more.

They are also regulars at the Bacardi NH7 Weekender Festival, having played all three editions of the same. in Pune in October 2011. On 27 November they played in Chitrakoot Grounds Andheri West for 26th Independence Rock Fest in Mumbai.

The band has shared the stage with many international bands such as Lamb Of God, Fear Factory, Satyricon, Textures, Sahg, Benea Reach, Intronaut, and Amon Amarth.

== Releases ==
Bhayanak Maut have released three albums – Hell Is All People (2004), Untitled (2009) and MAN (2014). All the albums were well received by metal fans all over India. Bhayanak Maut have been featured in a compilation album called Fine Tuned Disasters. The album was released on 6 August 2006. The album showcased close to 20 songs from BM and other Mumbai bands like Scribe, Skincold, Amidst the Chaos, Bitchslap and Pin Drop Violence. The CD contains the tracks — "Boiled Unwound Filatured", "Pica", "Phlegm Blot Technik" and "Elcit Set Nois Rot."

They released their second full-length studio album, which is untitled, on 4 August 2009, through Grey and Saurian Records, Delhi. The 11 song sophomore effort contains fan-favourites – Ranti Nasha, MNS Messenger, Ungentle, Blasted Beyond Belief and Tit For Twat. The album picked up a 4-star review from Rolling Stone Magazine in September 2009, the first Indian metal album to do so. The band also won 'Album of the year' – Critics choice award at the Jack Daniels rock awards 2010.

In October 2014, the band released their third independently produced album, MAN

== Discography ==
- Hell Is All People (2004)
- Malignant [EP] (2006)
- Untitled (2009)
- Metastasis [EP] (2010)
- MAN (2014)

== Band members ==
- Aman Virdi – vocals
- R. Venkatraman (Baba) – guitars, keys, samples
- Aditya Gopinathan (Amidtsya) – guitars
- Rahul Hariharan – drums
- Ishaan Krishna – bass
- Aniket Wankhade (Anny) – (New joinee) guitars

== See also ==
- Indian rock
- Kryptos (band)
- Nicotine (Metal Band)
- Inner Sanctum (band)
- Demonic Resurrection
