= Kryptos (band) =

Indian heavy metal band

KRYPTOS
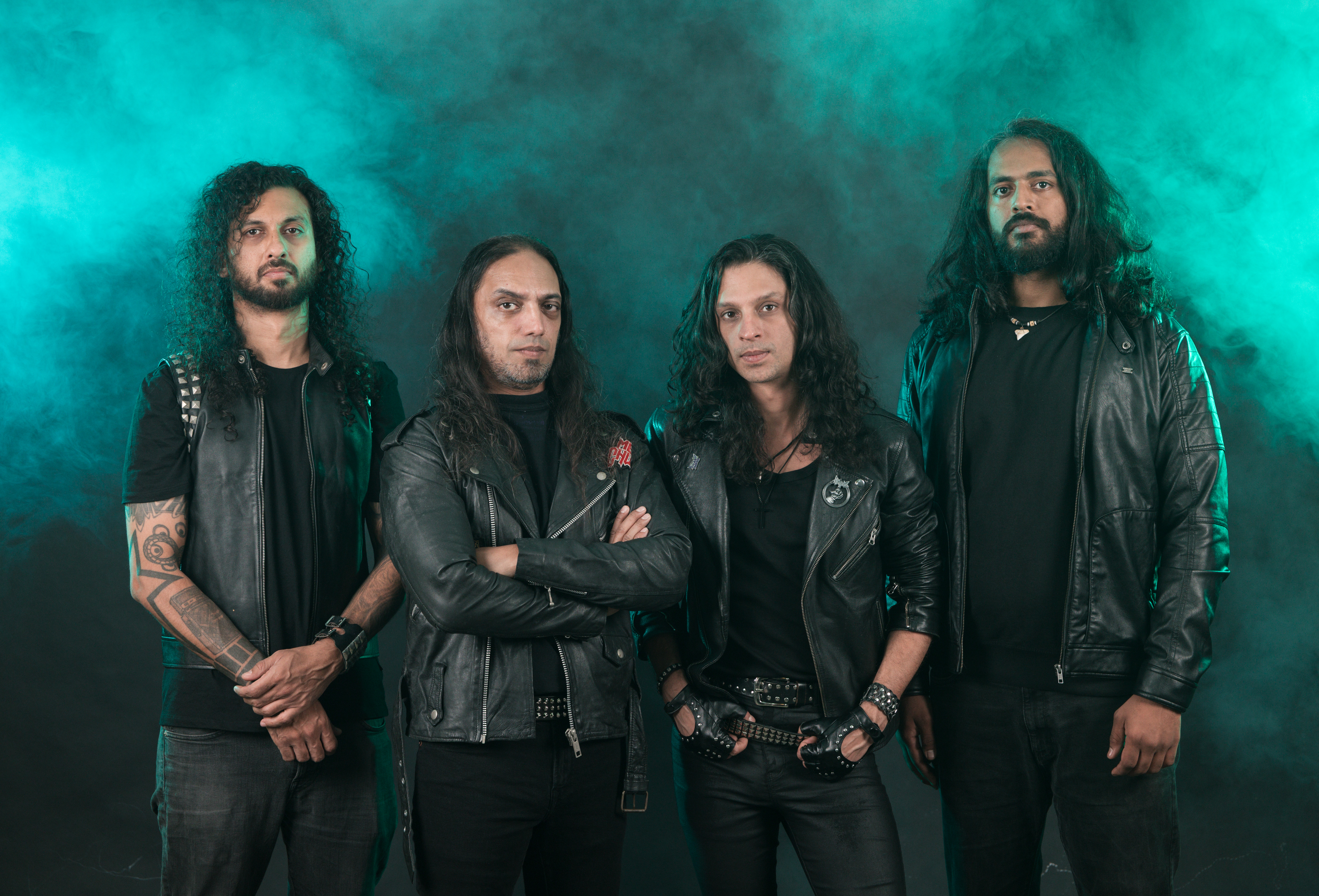
- 2026 promotional image

Background information
- Origin: Bangalore, India
- Genre: Heavy metal
- Years active: 1998–present
- Label: AFM
- Members: Nolan Lewis; Rohit Chaturvedi; Abbas Razvi; Vishnu Reddy
- Past members: Ching Len; Akshay 'Axe' Patel; Ryan Colaco; Jayawant Tewari; Ganesh Krishnaswamy; Anthony Hoover; Vijit Singh
- Website: Kryptos Official Page

Kryptos is an Indian heavy metal band from Bangalore, Karnataka, regarded as a modern Indian heavy metal pioneer.

Known for their blend of 80s metal, NWOBHM, and thrash metal, Kryptos draws influence from Iron Maiden, Judas Priest, Thin Lizzy, Coroner and Kreator. The band has released seven studio albums and toured Europe and Asia.

In 2013, Kryptos became the first Indian heavy metal band to perform at Wacken Open Air, one of the world's largest metal festivals.

== History ==
=== Formation and early years (1998–2003) ===
Guitarist Nolan Lewis and bassist Ganesh Krishnaswamy formed Kryptos in Bangalore in 1998. Influenced by heavy metal from the 1970s and 1980s, the band performed locally and spearheaded the growing Indian underground metal scene.

=== Debut album (2004) ===
In 2004, Kryptos released their debut studio album, Spiral Ascent, which became one of the earliest internationally recognized heavy metal releases from India.

The album gained underground attention within India and in Europe and South America. Although long out of print, Spiral Ascent is cited as an early influence on modern Indian heavy metal.

=== The Ark of Gemini, lineup changes and supporting Iron Maiden (2006–2009) ===
In 2006, Kryptos signed with California-based label Old School Metal Records, becoming one of the first Indian metal bands to secure an international record deal.

During this period, Nolan Lewis took over lead vocals while continuing as rhythm guitarist. Rohit Chaturvedi (lead guitar) and Jayawant Tewari (bass) joined the band, with Ryan Colaco on drums.

Kryptos recorded and released their second studio album, The Ark of Gemini, in 2008, which received positive reviews from international metal media and radio stations.

In 2009, Kryptos opened for Iron Maiden at Rock 'N India 2009 in Bangalore, playing to almost 17,000 fans at the Palace Grounds.

=== The Coils of Apollyon and signing with AFM Records (2010–2013) ===
In 2010, Kryptos became the first Indian metal band to complete a European tour. This was the beginning of much touring over the next two decades, across India and Europe.

The band released their third studio album, The Coils of Apollyon, in 2012, and signed with German metal label AFM Records.

In 2013, Kryptos became the first Indian heavy metal band to appear at Wacken Open Air.

=== Burn Up the Night, Afterburner and Force of Danger (2014–2021) ===
Following their breakthrough in Europe, Jayawant Tewari and Ryan Colaco left the band with Ganesh K. returning on bass and Anthony Hoover taking over on drums.

In 2016, Kryptos released their fourth studio album Burn Up the Night, which was widely praised for its strong homage to the sound and aesthetics of classic 1980s heavy metal. The band continued their march across Europe, touring with Sacred Reich, Death Angel, Exodus and other heavy hitters.

The band returned to Wacken Open Air once again in 2017 and followed this up with their fifth studio album Afterburner in 2019, their most commercially successful album to date.

During this period, Ganesh K. departed once again and Anthony Hoover was replaced by Vijit Singh. Undeterred, Kryptos released their sixth album, Force of Danger in 2021, continuing their focus on high-energy traditional heavy metal.

The band embarked on an extensive European tour in 2022, reinforcing their status as one of metal's hottest live acts.

=== Decimator and recent activity (2024–present) ===
In 2024, Kryptos teamed up with producer Jamie Elton (Watain, Tribulation) and released their seventh studio album Decimator in 2024. Robin Utbult (Vicious Rumors, Sacred) recorded bass on the album, which featured tighter and sharper songwriting.

In 2025, the band parted ways with Vijit Singh after several years of recording and touring.

With Abbas Razvi coming in on bass and Vishnu Reddy on drums, Kryptos continue to move forward with another European tour scheduled for late 2026 and a new album in the pipeline for 2027.

== Band members ==
=== Present ===
- Nolan Lewis - Vocals/Guitar (1998–present)
- Rohit Chaturvedi - Lead guitar (2006–present)
- Abbas Razvi - Bass (2026–present)
- Vishnu Reddy - Drums (2026–present)

=== Former ===
- Ganesh Krishnaswamy - Vocals (1998–2005), Bass (1998–2005, 2013–2021)
- Akshay 'Axe' Patel - Lead guitar (2001–2006)
- Jayawant Tewari - Bass (2005–2013)
- Ching Len - Drums (1998–2000)
- Ryan Colaco - Drums (2000–2013)
- Anthony Hoover - Drums (2013–2018)
- Vijit Singh - Drums (2019–2025)

=== Touring and sessions members ===
- Vasuchandran V.
- Robin Utbult
- Deepak Raghu

== Discography ==
=== Studio releases ===
- Spiral Ascent (2004)
- The Ark of Gemini (2008)
- The Coils of Apollyon (2012)
- Burn Up The Night (2016)
- Afterburner (2019)
- Force of Danger (2021)
- Decimator (2024)

== See also ==
- Indian rock
- Demonic Resurrection
- Nicotine
- Inner Sanctum
- Bhayanak Maut
- Amorphia (band)
