= Inner Sanctum (band) =

Indian metal band

- Origin: Bangalore, India
- Genres: Death metal, thrash metal, groove metal
- Years active: 2006–present
- Labels: Unsigned
- Members: Shashank Bhatnagar (Vocals); Chintan Chinnappa (Guitars); Tejas Jayaraman (Guitars); Narayan Shrouthy(Bass); Ujwal (Drums)
- Past members: Gaurav Basu; Suraj Gulvady; Arjun Mulky; Abhinav Yogesh; Abhishek Michael

Inner Sanctum is an Indian death/thrash metal band from Bangalore, formed in 2006.

Inner Sanctum has received awards including the Band of the Year 2007 (Levis), Indian Band of the year 2009 and Best Emerging Band of the year (2010 Jack Daniels Rock Awards (India)).

Inner Sanctum have independently released an EP Provenance in 2009. Recorded at Resonance Studios, Bangalore and mixed and mastered at LSD Studios, Germany. Provenance was hailed as one of the top 10 EPs of the decade by Rock Street Journal (RSJ) in 2010.

Inner Sanctum have gigged extensively all across the country and supported some of the biggest metal bands in India, including Metallica for 2011 Vladivar Rock 'N India in Bangalore. They opened the 2011 Rock 'N India show along with Guillotine and Scottish Band Biffy Clyro for Metallica on 30 October 2011.

Inner Sanctum have also supported bands like Amon Amarth, Cradle of Filth, Enslaved and Textures on their Indian tours, and completed a European tour in June 2013 ending it with an appearance in Metalfest Open Air Poland, alongside Down, Red Fang, Destruction, Entombed, Karma to Burn and many more. Inner sanctum had also opened for the American thrash metal band Slayer in 2012 Vladivar Rock 'N India, Bangalore in October 2012.

Inner Sanctum are one of the first Indian bands to have personalised gig flyers for each of their gigs. Vocalist, Gaurav Basu does all the bands artwork and posters. The bands' love for the poster culture of the west has pushed them to introduce it amongst the independent music scene in India.

== History ==
Inner Sanctum was formed in the early months of 2007. Chintan and Michael, the founder members having played with each other for several years decided to join forces and form a band that would best express their influences in music. Tejas who previously played for Premonition was roped in as the second guitar player. In search of a drummer and vocalist the trio auditioned several but zeroed in on Abhinav (ex Illusion) and Gaurav, thus completing the line up. Inner Sanctum has over the years earned critical and commercial acclaim and has even numerous awards including the Band of the Year 2007 (Levis), Band of the year 2009 (headbangers.in) and Best Emerging Band of the year (Jack Daniels Rock Awards).

== Members ==
Present:

- Shashank Bhatnagar - vocals
- Chintan Chinappa - guitars
- Tejas Jayaraman - guitars
- Narayan Shrouthy - bass
- Ujwal K S – drums

Previous:

- Abhinav Yogesh – drums
- Arjun Mulky - guitars
- Rajeev Ramesh - guitars
- Abhishek Michael - bass
- Suraj Gulvady - guitars
- Gaurav Basu - vocals
- Jared Sandy - drums

== Discography ==
EPs

- Provenance (2009)

Albums

- Legions Awake (2015)

Singles

- Divided by Hate (2020)
- The Face of Evil (2023)

== See also ==
- Indian rock
- Kryptos (band)
- Nicotine (Metal Band)
- Demonic Resurrection
- Bhayanak Maut
