= Demonic Resurrection =

Indian blackened death metal band

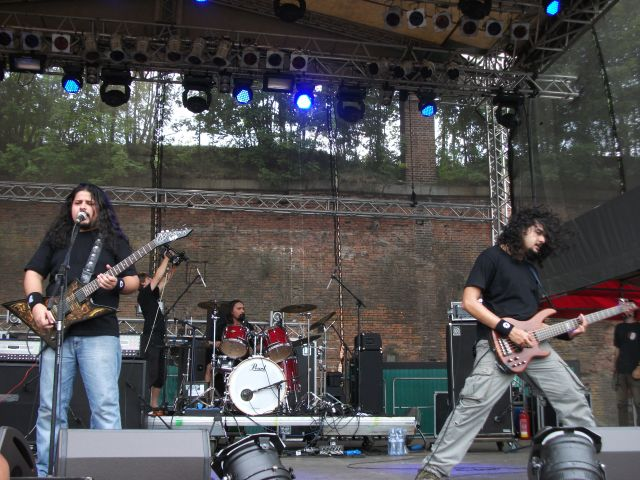
- Demonic Resurrection performing at Brutal Assault in 2010

Background information
- Origin: Mumbai, Maharashtra, India
- Genres: Death metal; blackened death metal; symphonic black metal; power metal
- Years active: 2000–present
- Labels: Candlelight; Demonstealer
- Members: Sahil "The Demonstealer" Makhija; Aditya Swaminathan; Swarnava Sengupta; Nikhil Rajkumar
- Past members: Virendra "Viru" Kaith; Daniel Rego; Nikita Shah; Nandani; Ashish; Prashant; Pradeep; Aditya "Count Varathora"; Yash Pathak; JP; Husain Bandukwala; Mephisto; Ashwin Shriyan; Nishith Hegde

Demonic Resurrection is a blackened death metal band from Mumbai, India, formed in 2000. Its 2025 line-up consists of Sahil "The Demonstealer" Makhija on vocals and rhythm guitar, Aditya Swaminathan on lead guitar, Swarnava Sengupta on bass and Nikhil Rajkumar on drums. Since its formation, the band has released five studio albums and one EP. The band's fourth album, The Demon King, was released on 13 July 2014 in India, 14 July in Europe and 15 July in the US by Candlelight Records and distributed in India by Universal Music.

The band has represented India at Wacken Open Air, Germany (2014) and they have performed at Inferno Metal Festival, Norway (2010), Brutal Assault, Czech Republic (2010) and MetalDays, Slovenia (2015).

In February 2025, the band performed at Bangalore Open Air, India and hinted at a tour to celebrate their 25th anniversary.

== History ==
=== Early years and Demonstealer (2000–2002) ===
Several 17-year-old teenagers formed the band in March 2000 to play extreme metal. Within nine months, the band released their first album, Demonstealer, through Demonstealer Records. Bands like Theatre of Tragedy, The Gathering, and Lacuna Coil influenced the album, which featured a female vocalist.

Shortly after the release of the album, the band faced many problems, and most of the members left. The line-up stabilized in 2001, with Sahil "The Demonstealer" Makhija on vocals and guitars, Count Varathora on bass, Nikita Shah on vocals and keyboards and Yash Pathak on the drums. The band has re-recorded Demonstealer with the current lineup. Brazilian record label Vampiria Records released a tape version of the album in the local market.

=== A Darkness Descends (2002–2007) ===
In 2002, the group disbanded, but reformed in 2003 with a new-lineup: Husain Bandukwala on bass, Mephisto on keyboards, JP on drums and Sahil Makhija on vocals and guitars.

The band enlisted lead guitarist Pradeep Pande in 2006, but drummer JP left due to musical differences the same year. The band recorded their EP and third studio effort, Beyond The Darkness, which featured on a split CD titled Rise of the Eastern Blood with bands Dusk from Pakistan and Severe Dementia from Bangladesh. Sahil Makhija took over drums for the EP. Beyond the Darkness showed a slightly more experimental side of the band, adding ambiance and ethereal textures to their sound. Filmmaker Sam Dunn (Metal: A Headbanger's Journey, Iron Maiden: Flight 666) featured the band in his documentary Global Metal. Demonic Resurrection made it to the soundtrack of Global Metal along with Lamb of God, Sepultura and In Flames.

=== Beyond the Darkness (2007–2009) ===
In August 2007, Virendra ‘Viru’ Kaith joined the band as a permanent drummer. The band continued touring and writing new material, until Pradeep quit in 2008 and was replaced with 18-year-old guitarist Daniel Rego. In 2009, the band began touring across India, becoming the support acts for Opeth in February 2009 and for Amon Amarth and Textures in December 2009.

=== The Return to Darkness (2009–2013) ===
The band returned to the studio in August 2009 to record their third album and the final chapter of the Darkness trilogy, The Return to Darkness. Michael ‘Xaay’ Lorac (Nile, Behemoth, Vader) designed the artwork for the album, and the band released their first video for "The Unrelenting Surge of Vengeance", which received (and continues to receive) airplay from mainstream music channels like VH1. The album was officially released in January 2010 through Candlelight Records (which they were signed to in April 2010) for worldwide distribution. The album was followed by a nationwide tour, "The Resurrection Festival". The band celebrated 10 years of activity with their first international show at the Inferno Metal Festival in Norway in April 2010, and played at the Brutal Assault festival in the Czech Republic in August 2010. The band released their first music video, 'The Unrelenting Surge of Vengeance' from their 2010 album, The Return to Darkness. The music video received a U/A rating from the Central Board of Film Certification, allowing it to be aired on Indian national TV.

In 2012, bass guitar player Husain Bandukwala left the band due to personal and family commitments, but went on to become the band's manager. The band soon announced Ashwin Shriyan as their new bassist. In 2014, lead guitarist, Daniel Kenneth Rego parted ways with the band to explore other musical possibilities. The band played a farewell show with Rego at the Blue Frog in Mumbai on 19 January 2014.

=== The Demon King (2013–2017) ===
On 22 May 2014, Demonic Resurrection revealed the artwork and track list for their fourth album titled The Demon King. The artwork was, once again, done by Michal ‘Xaay’ Loranc who had done the band's previous album cover for The Return to Darkness.

The album was released on 13 July in India, 14 July in Europe and 15 July in the US by Candlelight Records and distributed in India by Universal Music.

The theme of the album was similar to the 'Darkness' trilogy. The story is about the resurrection of the Demon King who has awakened on the Earth for the destruction of humankind, the apocalypse. Recorded in the year 2013, Daniel Rego is the guitarist credited for the tracks although Nishith Hegde became the new guitarist.

On 25 May 2014, the band released a preview video for The Demon King on YouTube.

Viru garnered a lot of praise for his drumming with the media bringing attention to Indian metal through interviews with MensXP.com, Polkacafe and India Today in addition to appearing in an advertisement for Signature whisky.

=== Dashavatar (2017–present) ===
On 15 March 2017, the band released their latest studio album, named Dashavatar - or the 10 forms - continuing on the use of Hindu mythology, also adapted for their previous album. The 10-track record covers the multitudinous forms that mythic god Vishnu takes. It was released on Sahil Makhija's Demonstealar Records. The album was scored 9/10 by Metal Injection.

Album track listing

1. Matsya – The Fish
2. Kurma – The Tortoise
3. Varaha – The Boar
4. Vamana – The Dwarf
5. Narasimha – The Man-Lion
6. Parashurama – The Axe Wielder
7. Rama – The Prince
8. Krishna – The Cowherd
9. Buddha – The Teacher
10. Kalki – The Destroyer of Filth

On 19 April 2018, in an interview with Rolling Stone India, Sahil Makhija said it was time to call it quits. However, the band continued touring and releasing music.

=== Decades of Darkness (2022-present) ===
On July 2nd 2022, the band released Decades of Darkness, an EP featuring 4 new songs and their instrumental versions. This was a digital-only independent release produced by Australian producer Misstiq. It featured Makhija, new guitarist Aditya Swaminathan, Pratika Prabhune, Obscura drummer David Diepold, and session drummer Kevin Paradis.

In 2025, Demonic Resurrection joined Midhaven and Calva Louise supporting headline act Bloodywood on a 26-date UK & European Tour. An Indian tour was also undertaken in late 2025 to celebrate the upcoming 25th anniversary of the band.

On February 6th 2026, the band released the 3-song Apocalyptic Dawn EP to celebrate 25 years of the band. It featured two new tracks called The Great Famine and Of Blindness and Divinity, as well as a re-recorded version of Apocalyptic Dawn from A Darkness Descends. Anabelle Iratni, who recorded Keyboards for Makhija's solo album The Propaganda Machine, reprised her role. Mastering was handled by Keshav Dhar of Skyharbor. Makhija revealed that the band had been simultaneously tracking drums for their next full-length album.

== Musical style and influences ==
Demonic Resurrection describe their music as blackened death metal, specifically "a point of equilibrium between 3 genres, Death Metal, Black Metal and Power Metal", though it can also be called symphonic black metal. Cradle of Filth, Dimmu Borgir, Emperor, Depresy, Cannibal Corpse and Darkthrone are some of the bands that have influenced the band from the earliest albums. Use of signature black and death metal motifs like growling vocals, shrieked vocals, highly distorted guitars played with tremolo picking, blast beats and double bass drumming along with ambient keyboards and clean vocal passages often serving as a bridge between two heavy parts is prevalent. All through the "Darkness" trilogy, Demonic Resurrection sees their music as a mixture of black and death metal with elements of power metal easily visible, most notably attributed to acts like Blind Guardian and Angra.

== Band members ==
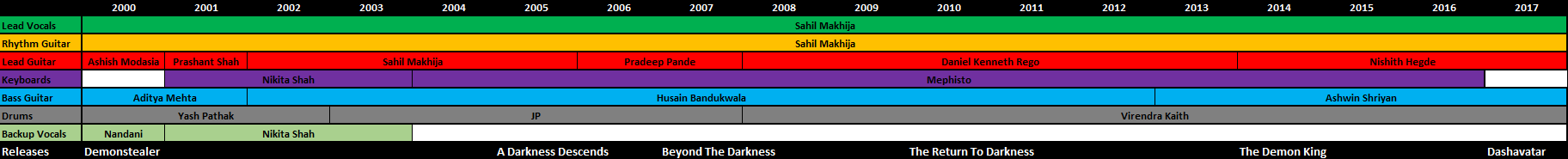
Timeline

Current members

- Sahil "The Demonstealer" Makhija – vocals, rhythm guitar (2000–present)
- Aditya Swaminathan - lead guitar (2022–present)
- Swarnava Sengupta - bass guitar (2024–present)
- Nikhil Rajkumar - drums (2025–present)

Former members

- Daniel Kenneth Rego – lead guitar (2008–2014)
- Virendra Kaith - drums (2007-2022)
- Nandani – female vocals (2000)
- Nikita Shah – vocals, keyboards (2000–2003)
- Yash Pathak - drums (2000 - 2002)
- Ashish Modasia – lead guitar (2000)
- Prashant Shah – lead guitar (2000–2001)
- Pradeep Pande – lead guitar (2006–2008)
- Aditya Mehta – bass guitar (2000–2003)
- Husain Bandukwala – bass guitar (2002–2012)
- JP - drums (2003–2007)
- Mephisto – keyboards (2003–2016)
- Ashwin Shriyan – bass guitar (2012–2017)
- Nishith Hegde – lead guitar (2013–2018)

Touring musicians

- Leon Quadros - bass guitar (2017–2019)
- Vigneshkumar Venkatraman - lead guitar (2018–2019)

== Discography ==
=== Studio albums ===
Title	Released	Format	Label
Demonstealer	(India) November 2000	CD, Tape	(India) Demonstealer Records
A Darkness Descends	(India) 20 October 2005	CD	(India) Demonstealer Records
The Return to Darkness	(India) 15 January 2010 (Europe) (United States) 12 July 2010	CD	(India) Demonstealer Records (Europe) (United States) Candlelight Records
The Demon King with Lucky Adler	(India) 13 July 2014 (Europe) (United Kingdom) 14 July 2014 (United States) 15 July 2014	CD	(India) Universal Music Group (Europe) (United Kingdom) (United States) Candlelight Records
Dashavatar	15 March 2017	Digital	Independent
Decades of Darkness	22 July 2022	Digital	Independent
Apocalyptic Dawn EP	6 February 2026	Digital	Independent

=== Other works ===
Title	Released	Format	Label
Beyond The Darkness	(India) 8 April 2007	CD	(India) Demonstealer Records
Rise of the Eastern Blood split with Severe Dementia, Dusk and Helmskey	(India) 2007	CD	(India) Demonstealer Records

=== Videos ===
- "Unrelenting Surge of Vengeance" (2010)

== Awards ==
- Metal Hammer Golden Gods Awards (2010)

== See also ==
- Indian rock
- Kryptos (band)
- Nicotine (Metal Band)
- Inner Sanctum (band)
- Bhayanak Maut
