= Nicotine (band) =

Indian heavy metal band

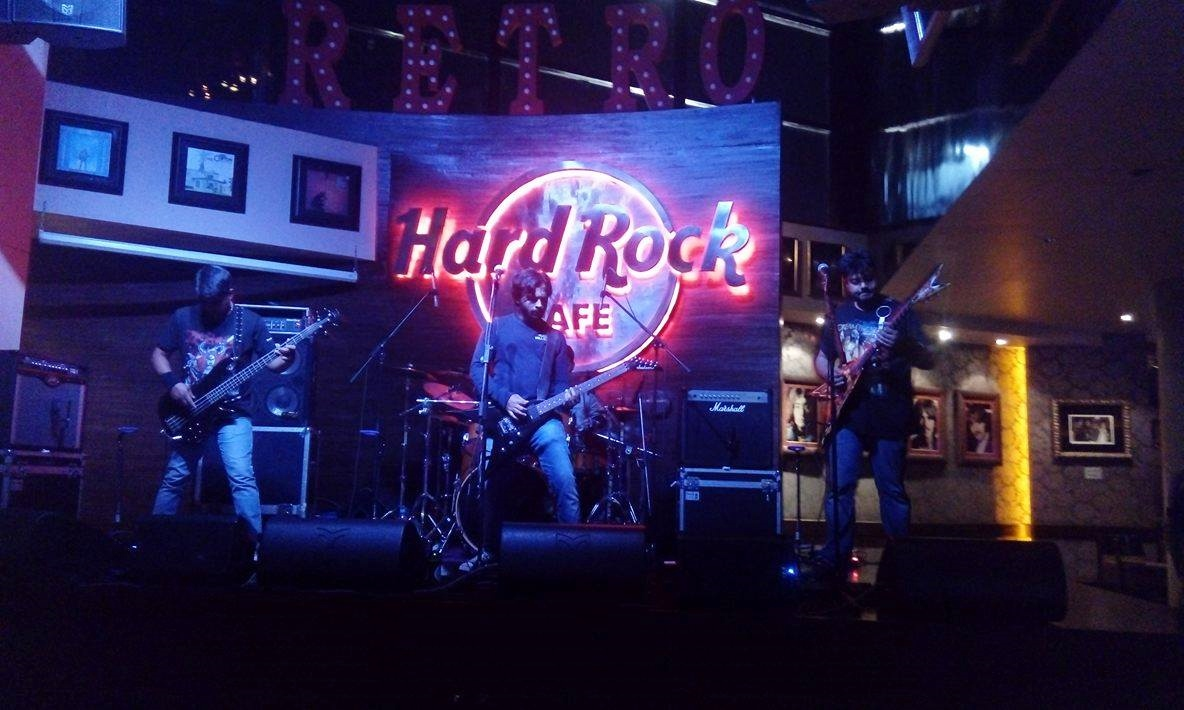
- Nicotine playing at the Hard Rock Cafe, in Hyderabad, India in 2016.

Background information
- Origin: Indore, Madhya Pradesh, India
- Genres: Heavy metal, hard rock
- Years active: 2006–2017
- Members: Digvijay Bhonsale; Aniruddha Gokhale (Founder); Anuj Malkapurkar; Shaleen Vyas
- Website: http://www.facebook.com/NicotineIndia

Nicotine were a heavy metal band from Indore, India, formed in December 2006. Its line-up consists of Digvijay Bhonsale on lead vocals/rhythm guitar, Aniruddha Gokhale (founding member) on lead guitar/backing vocals, Anuj Malkapurkar on bass guitar and Shaleen Vyas on drums. The band is widely known for being the 'Pioneers of Metal music in Central India', as they were one of the first bands to introduce heavy metal music in the region. Their songs "Odium" and "Rein of Fire" were released for free downloading by the band on various websites. The band is influenced by American and British rock and metal bands such as Rage Against the Machine, Metallica, Megadeth, Iron Maiden and Pantera. The band hasn't played any gigs since Bhonsale moved to Harare, Zimbabwe in 2017.

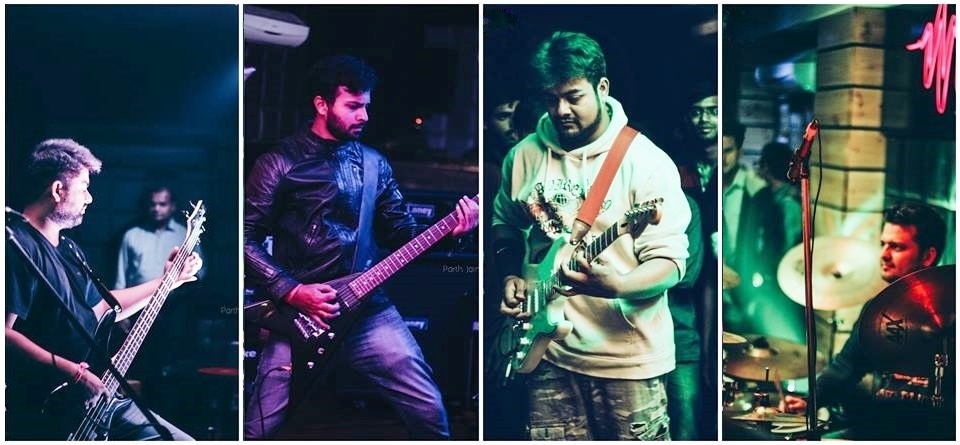
From left to right: Malkapurkar (bass guitar), Bhonsale (lead vocals/guitar), Gokhale (lead guitar/backing vocals) and Vyas (drums).

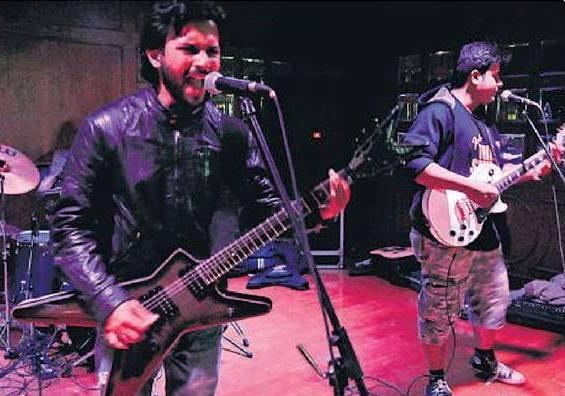
Nicotine playing at 'Pedal To The Metal', Ten Downing Street, Indore, India.

== See also ==
- Indian rock
