= Highway 69 (band) =

Indian metal band

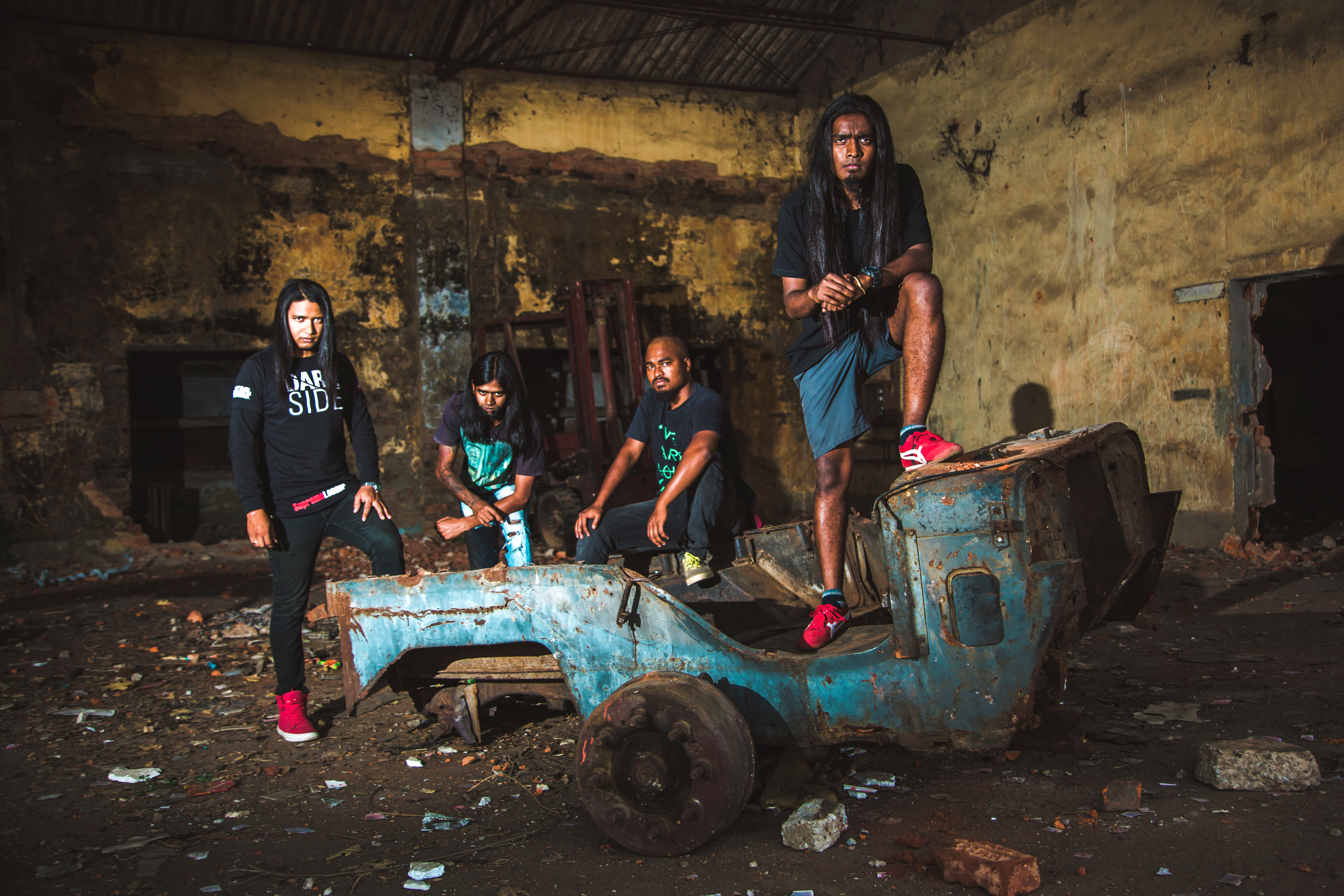
- Members of Highway 69. From left to right: Alvin Rozario, John Raj Swami, Binit Barla and Tarang Kerketta.

Background information
- Origin: Ranchi, Jharkhand, India.
- Genres: Heavy metal
- Years active: 2012–present
- Members: Binit Barla; John Raj Swami; Tarang Kerketta
- Past members: Alvin Rozario; Nikhil Dhanraj; Anugraha Sonal Johnson Mundu; Dheeraj Edward; Sudeep Hembrom
- Website: Youtube

Highway 69 is an Indian heavy metal band. The band was formed in 2012 in Ranchi by vocalist Tarang Kerketta and guitarist Alvin Rozario, and has been based in Ranchi ever since its formation. The band has been the winners of numerous battle of band titles across their country and is known for their fast tempos, instrumental and aggressive style of playing. The band has performed twice as the finalists at Hornbill International Rock Contest of Hornbill Festival in Nagaland for the year 2017 and 2018. Their drummer has also bagged the title of the 'Best Drummer' in the year 2017 at this festival and was felicitated by Uday Benegal from the Indus Creed which is a band considered to be the pioneers of the Indian rock music.

The band released their debut EP United In Rage in June 2021.

== History ==
=== Formation and early years (2012–2013) ===
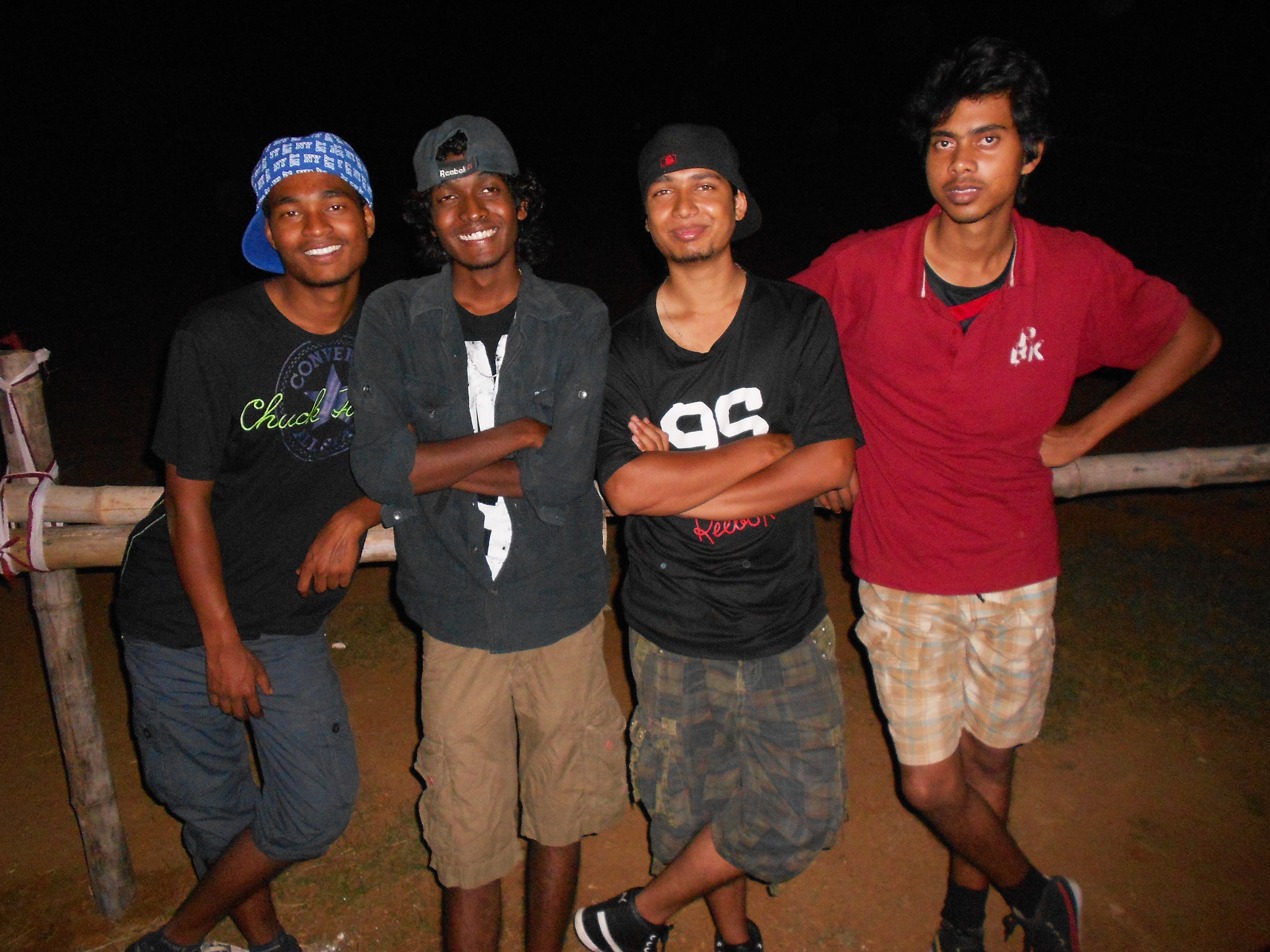
Highway 69 after doing their first show together as a band at Utthaan fest of BIT Mesra (Deoghar campus) in October 2012. (From left: Binit Barla, Tarang Kerketta, Alvin Rozario and Dheeraj Edward.)

Highway 69 was formed in Ranchi, Jharkhand in mid-2012 with the founding members being Tarang Kerketta and Alvin Rozario. Back then, Tarang used to live in Jamshedpur which is a city approximately 120 km from Ranchi. He was the vocalist of a metal band based in Jamshedpur called Atript while Alvin was the guitarist for a metal band in Ranchi called Destiny. Both of them met for the first time during a local battle of the band competition in Ranchi. It is considered that it was the initial place where both of them decided on forming a band of their own.

The band Highway 69 was started with Tarang on the vocals and Alvin on the guitars, along with that Alvin's friends Binit Barla on the bass and Dheeraj Edward on the drums. The band started to practice together and composed their first song called 'Disturbed'. They went on to participate in a battle of bands competition organized at BIT Deoghar by Utthaan where the band won the competition along with that Alvin was awarded the best guitarist in the competition. As it was the year-end of 2012, then went on to do few local gigs in Ranchi and Jamshedpur. They also had a major achievement in their early years by winning the Wheels competition organized by TATA Steel in Jamshedpur.

=== Dheeraj quits, Johnson joins the band and Thunderstrock Festival (2013-2014) ===
Dheeraj and Alvin were bandmates in their previous metal band. Both had high expectation from their band but weren't able to find that same spirit in that band, so they left to form Highway 69. But even before completing one year as the drummer for Highway 69, Dheeraj decided to quit the band citing difficulty in managing his time between the band and his higher studies.

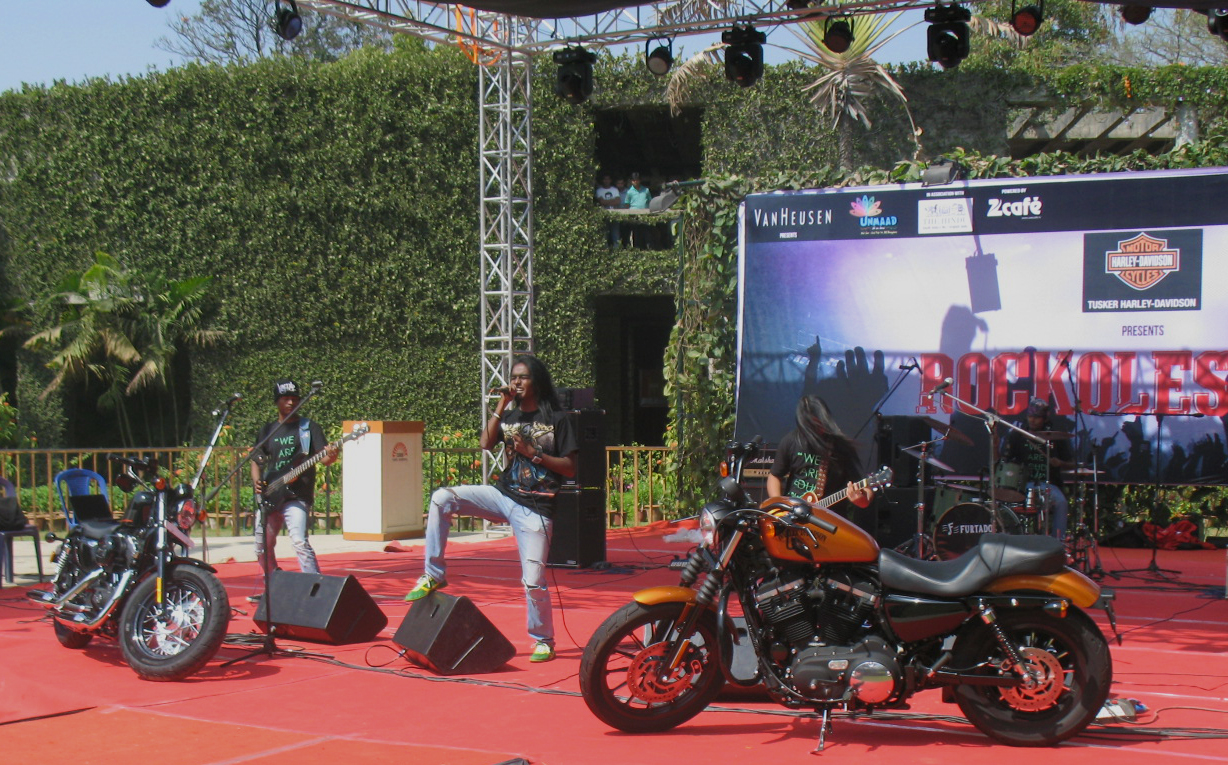
Highway 69 performing at Rockolesseum of Unmaad, the cultural festival of IIM Bangalore

Dheeraj was replaced by Anugraha Sonal Johnson Mundu who too was Alvin's friend. He joined the band and the band continued with him. With the new line-up, the band won the battle of bands competitions at St. Xavier's School, Ranchi, NIFFT Ranchi, made their appearance in the Avalanche of Srijan at ISM Dhanbad and in Rockolesseum of Unmaad, the cultural festival of IIM Bangalore. Performing in Bangalore became their very first metropolitan show as a band which also required travelling of approximately 1,900 km from their hometown. The Bangalore show became the place where the band got the exposure of various other bands and musicians who were part of that fest like Blackstratblues, Karsh Kale, Farhan Akhtar and many others. The band also performed at Detox, which was an initiative by the Government of Jharkhand to promote the local rock & metal music culture. They shared the stage with Demonic Resurrection, Girish and The Chronicles and other local bands from the city.

Later during mid-2014, Tarang Kerketta took the initiative of starting a defunct rock & metal music festival of Ranchi called Thunderstrock Festival, a charitable music festival started in 2008 with the initiative of promoting the local music scene as well as donating the funds generated from it to the people in need. Tarang is generally credited in bringing this stagnant music festival back to life again in 2014 by giving the stage to the local bands like Death Note (now Reciprocal), Destiny (band in which Alvin and Dheeraj used to play earlier), Error 404, Virus (John, the drummer of this band later joins Highway 69), Genesis, Highway 69 and Head Motif all the way from Darjeeling, West Bengal.

=== Replacement of drummers and winning competitions across India (2015–2018) ===
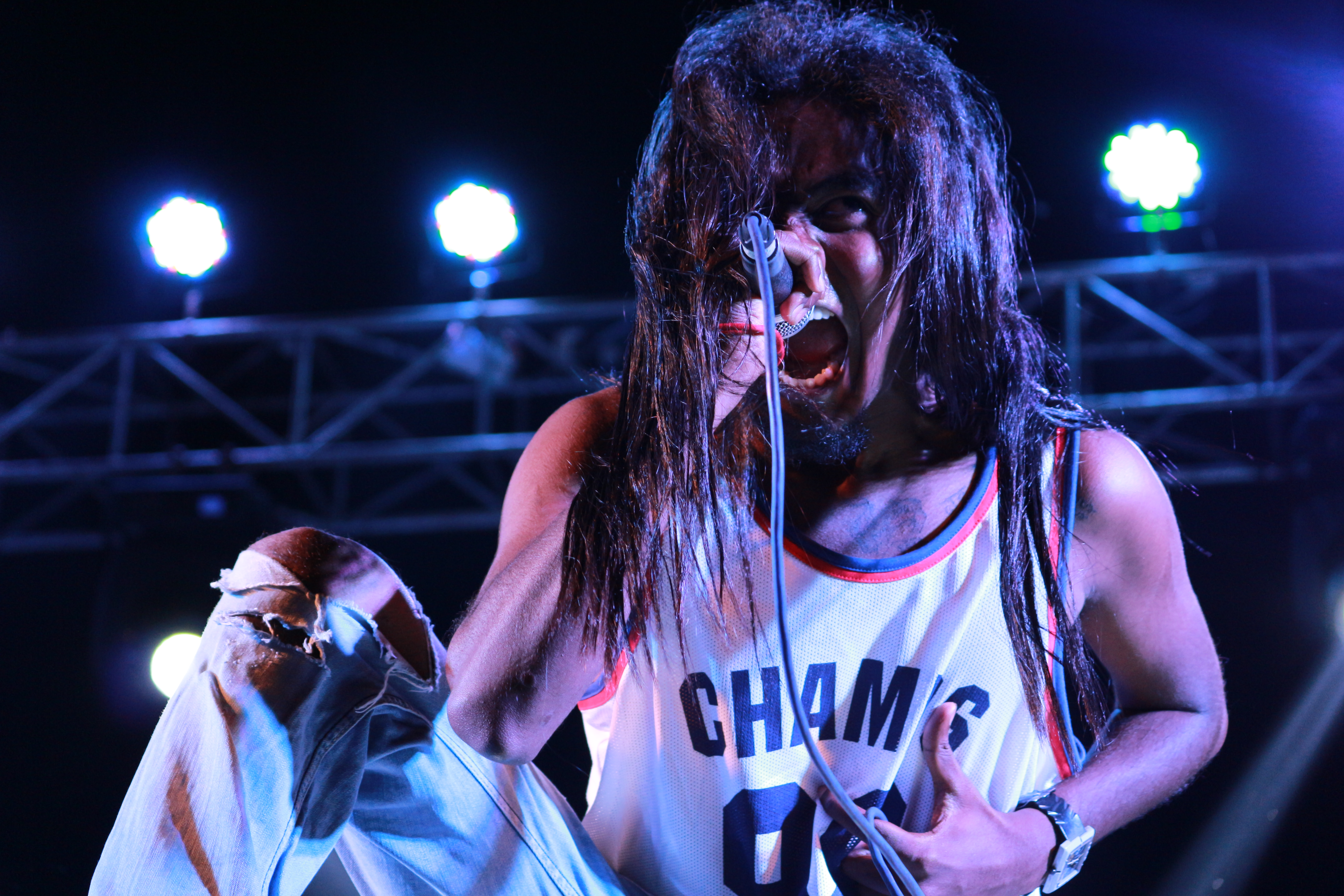
Tarang Kerketta performing at Pepsi MTV Indies - Ranchi Rocks: Chapter 1, in 2015

Johnson left the band in 2015 and Dheeraj was considered in the band's line-up once again. With Dheeraj, the band went on to participate at i-Rock of Jinks-Pranav at NIFFT Ranchi, Thundermarch at NIT Silchar and Avalanche of Srijan at IIT (ISM) Dhanbad. The band won the competitions at NIFFT Ranchi and IIT (ISM) Dhanbad but could not secure any position at NIT Silchar (later in 2018, they won the competition). The band also headlined the Pepsi MTV Indies - Ranchi Rocks: Chapter 1 in 2015 which had the local bands of Ranchi along with the headliner band from Bangalore named Live Banned.

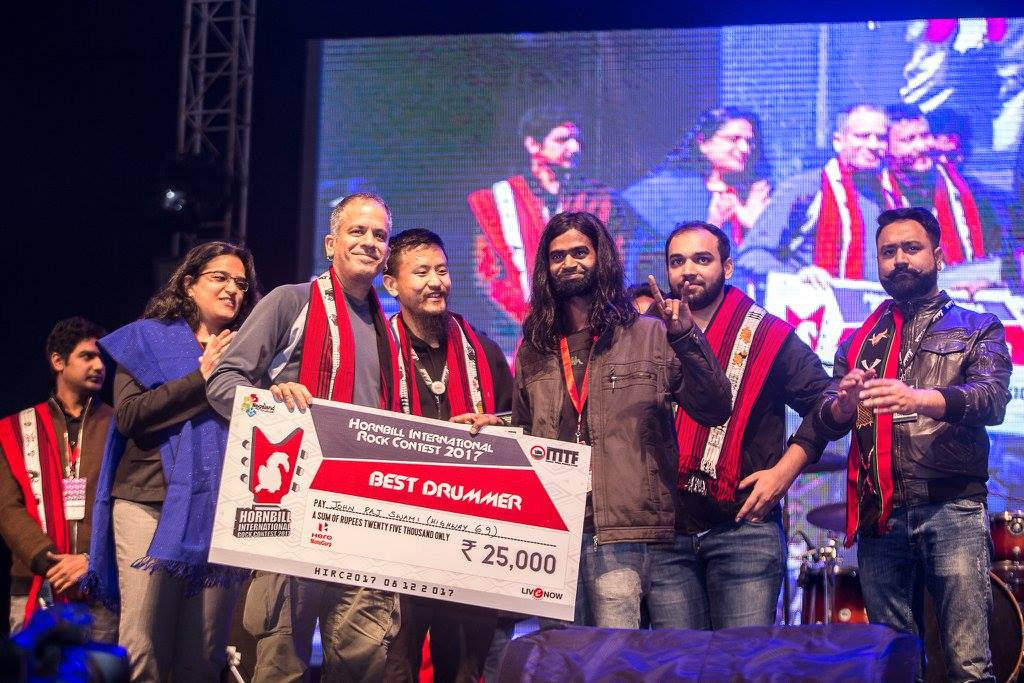
John receiving the Best Drummer award from Uday Benegal of Indus Creed at Hornbill International Rock Contest in 2017.

Later in the year 2015, Dheeraj again decided to leave the band. So they finally decided on having a permanent drummer who will be committed towards the band. During this time, the band practised with various drummers from Ranchi, Jamshedpur and even Kolkata but ultimately settled for John Raj Swami, who was a drummer for a local metal band called Virus. The band was already familiar with the playing style of John as they had shared the stage in various competitions and music festivals across India. The growing confusion over who would continue in the band as a drummer was finally sorted out. This gave the band ample time to practice and compose new songs. John is quite popular amongst the audience and other fellow musicians because of his aggressive style of drumming along with going shirtless when performing on-stage.

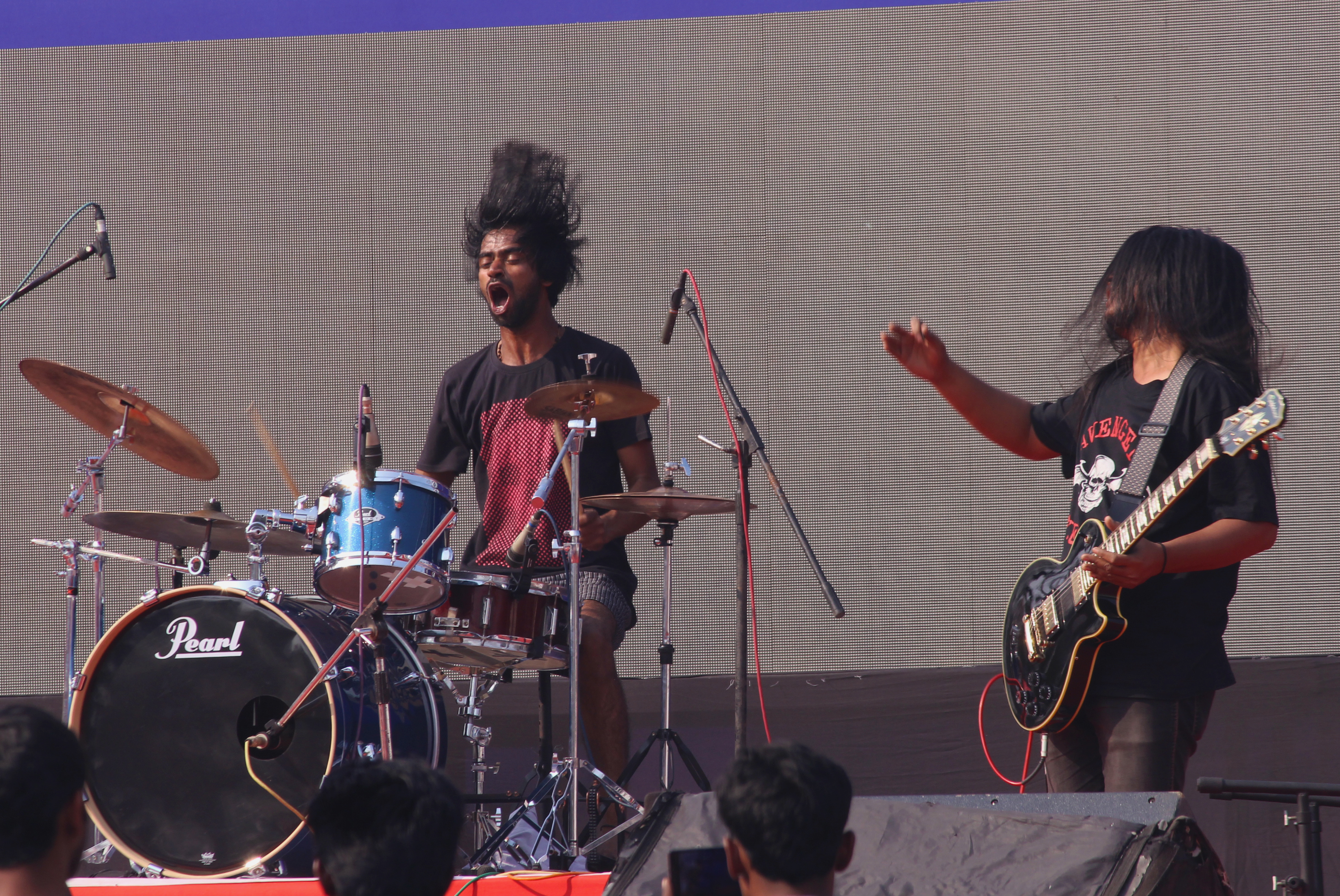
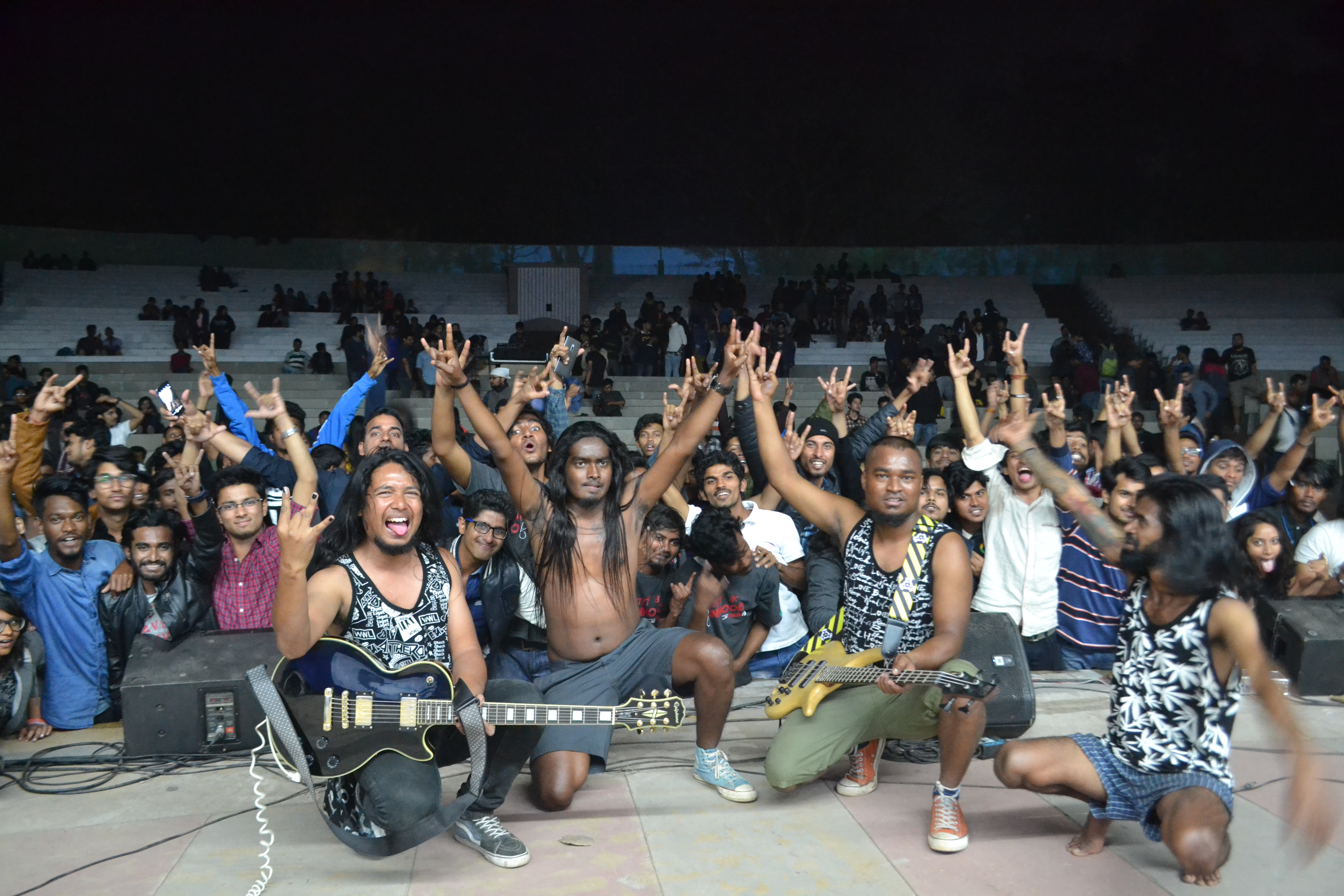
John and Alvin during their performance at Culfest of NIT Jamshedpur in 2016. (top) and Highway 69 after completing their performance at Spring Fest of IIT Kharagpur in 2017. (bottom)

With the new drummer in hand who is regular in practice, the band could finally look forward to participating at major battle of the bands competitions in India. During the span of 2015–2018, the band went to participate in festivals across India of which they won the competitions like Fuego - KIIT Fest of KIIT Bhubaneswar, Blizzard of Rock - Chaos of IIM Ahmedabad, Distortion - Culfest of NIT Jamshedpur, Rocktaves - Oasis of BITS Pilani, Searock of Waves (festival) at BITS Pilani - Goa Campus, Till Deaf Do We Part of Pearl (cultural festival) at BITS Pilani - Hyderabad Campus, Resonance of Festember at NIT Trichy, Synchronicity of Antaragni at IIT Kanpur, Decibelz of Xpressions at XIM Bhubaneswar and Thundermarch of Incandescene at NIT Silchar. The band won the runner-up positions at Wildfire of Spring Fest at IIT Kharagpur, Strawberry Fields at NLSIU Bangalore, Livewire of Mood Indigo (festival) at IIT Bombay, Decibels of Saarang at IIT Madras, Rock-o-Phonix of Alcheringa (festival) at IIT Guwahati and have been twice declared the finalists at Hornbill International Rock Contest of Hornbill Festival at Nagaland in 2017 and 2018. John was received the best drummer award at Hornbill Festival in 2017. During their span of covering major music competitions across India, the band started to attain national recognition in the metal music scene and considerable fan following as well as positive reception and appreciation from fellow musicians and promoters at the events.

In mid-2017, there was some misunderstanding within the band due to which John was removed from the band and in his replacement, a drummer from Jamshedpur called Nikhil Dhanraj played the drums for Highway 69. With Nikhil, the band did a couple of shows with participation in the competition held at NIT Trichy, Tamil Nadu and a music master class by Highway 69 at Chakradharpur, Jharkhand. Within a short span of John's absence, he was again included in the line-up. Also in the same year, the band was shortlisted for the first time in the Eastern-leg of Wacken Metal Battle organized by Bangalore Open Air alongside Astitiva (now Existence), Reciprocal from Ranchi and Chronic Xorn from Kolkata but due to the unavailability of their bassist; they did not go for the competition.

Along with the competitions, the timeline of 2015-2018 was also spent in composing new original songs by the band. The band composed their originals like Beyond Imagination, Don't Be The Prisoners Of The Past, Hope and Origin. Apart from taking part in competitions, they headlined in music festivals of Jamshedpur, Ranchi and Kolkata which eventually helped them gain the pace of a popular upcoming metal band in their own state. Having spent a long-time in competitions, the year 2018 was marked as the last year to participate in competitions.

=== Headlining and judging shows, release of United In Rage (2019–present) ===
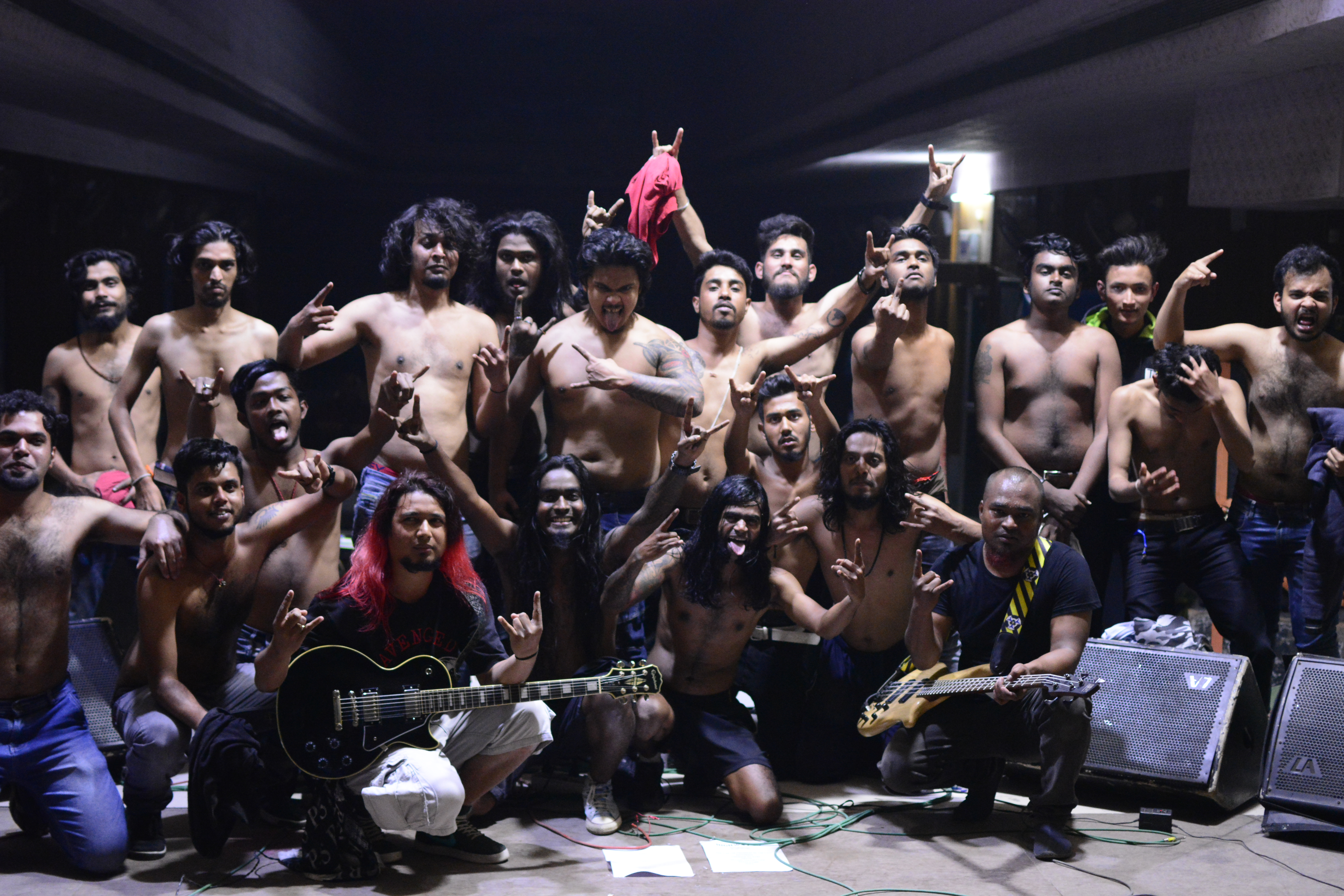
A group photo with the audience after completing the show at Jalpaiguri in 2019.

In mid-2018, when Tarang started the work for Thunderstrock Festival, he took on-board Tarun Paul Kachhap to manage the promotions of the festival and eventually he made Tarun the manager for Highway 69. Also by the end of 2018 when the band was returning from Hornbill Festival in Nagaland they decided to give an end to participating in music competitions and work in their debut EP and give preference to booked shows. They have been booked to judge Fuego of KIIT Fest 2019 in KIIT Bhubaneswar, Avalanche of Srijan 2019 in IIT (ISM) Dhanbad and twice at Rhapsody of Bitotsav 2019 and 2020 in BIT Mesra. They even got headliner shows in Jorhat, twice in Jalpaiguri, opening for Jubin Nautiyal, a Bollywood singer at Srijan of IIT (ISM) Dhanbad, Bitotsav of BIT Mesra and shows in Ranchi. Despite their decision of 2018, which meant to not take part in any competitions, the band went to register for Wacken Metal Battle which is organized by Bangalore Open Air. It is India's only dedicated heavy metal open-air music festival which takes place yearly in Bangalore in collaboration with Wacken Open Air. The band had earlier registered for the competition in 2017 but couldn't go to perform due to their bassist's unavailability. So they once again gave a try by participating in the competition in 2020 and were shortlisted for the Eastern India-leg of Wacken Metal Battle alongside other West Bengal-based bands. Highway 69 could not win the competition but the band shared the stage with some really great bands in the competition and witnessed the performance of headliners like Chronic Xorn and Kryptos.

As the band members live in different places with Alvin in Ranchi, Binit in Khelari and John in Khunti of Jharkhand while Tarang lives in Angul of Odisha state of India. Despite living in different places, the band meets up on weekdays for their band practice. Late 2018 to early 2019, the band went for recording their debut EP in a studio based in their hometown Ranchi but were not impressed with the output. Due to this, the band decided to record their EP at recording studios based in Kolkata but the COVID-19 pandemic in India of 2020 hampered the band's recording sessions as they travelled from Ranchi & Angul to Kolkata for getting themselves recorded at studios with the on-going pandemic. They went on record their debut EP in August 2020 and finally released their EP United In Rage in June 2021.

== Band members ==
Current members

- Tarang Kerketta – vocals (2012–present)
- Binit Barla – bass, backing vocals (2012–present)
- John Raj Swami – drums (2015–present)

Former members

- Dheeraj Edward – drums (2012–2013 & 2015)
- Anugraha Sonal Johnson Mundu – drums (2014)
- Nikhil Dhanraj – drums (2017)
- Alvin Rozario – guitar, backing vocals (2012–2021)
- Sudeep Hembrom – guitar (2021–2023)

Timeline

== Discography ==
=== United In Rage (2021) ===
The debut EP release by the band, consisting of three songs namely Disturbed, Hope and Don't Be The Prisoners Of The Past. All the songs in the EP have been their previously composed songs from 2012 to 2015, yet it was officially released after a long wait in 2021.

Track listing

No.	Title	Writer(s)	Length
1.	"Disturbed"	Highway 69	5:30
2.	"Don't Be The Prisoners Of The Past"	Highway 69	3:07
3.	"Hope"	Highway 69	3:48
Total length:			12:25

== Awards and nominations ==
Year	Event	Venue	Result	Special Mention
2012	Utthaan	Birla Institute of Technology (Deoghar), Jharkhand	Won	Best Drummer and Best Guitarist
2012	Fire Fly	SMPC, Ranchi, Jharkhand	1st Runner Up	
2012	Wheels of Tata Steel	Jamshedpur, Jharkhand	1st Runner Up	
2013	Umang of JVM Alumni Association	Mecon Stadium, Ranchi, Jharkhand	Won	
2013	Metal Fest	Ranchi, Jharkhand	1st Runner Up	
2014	i-Rock of Jinks-Pranav	National Institute of Foundry and Forge Technology, Ranchi, Jharkhand	Won	
2014	Wheels of Tata Steel	Jamshedpur, Jharkhand	1st Runner Up	
2014	Warchasva of Government of Jharkhand	Ranchi, Jharkhand	1st Runner Up	
2014	Rockolesseum of Unmaad	Indian Institute of Management Bangalore, Karnataka		Finalists
2014	Battle of Bands of Carnival	St. Xavier's School, Ranchi, Jharkhand	Won	
2014	Avalanche of Srijan	Indian Institute of Technology (Indian School of Mines), Dhanbad, Jharkhand		Finalists
2015	Clash of Bands	Jamshedpur, Jharkhand	Won	
2015	i-Rock of Jinks Pranav	National Institute of Foundry and Forge Technology, Ranchi, Jharkhand	Won	
2015	Avalanche of Srijan	Indian Institute of Technology (Indian School of Mines), Dhanbad, Jharkhand	Won	
2015	Battle of Bands of JCI Expo Utsav	Ranchi, Jharkhand	Won	
2016	Warchasv of Government of Jharkhand	Ranchi, Jharkhand	1st Runner Up	Best Bassist and Best Drummer
2016	Fuego of KIIT Fest	Kalinga Institute of Industrial Technology, Bhubaneswar, Odisha	Won	
2016	Rock N Rolla	Veer Surendra Sai University of Technology, Burla, Sambalpur, Odisha	Won	
2016	Distortion of Culfest	National Institute of Technology, Jamshedpur, Jharkhand	Won	
2016	Searock of Waves (festival)	Birla Institute of Technology and Science, Pilani – Goa Campus, Goa	1st Runner Up	
2016	Rocktaves of Oasis	Birla Institute of Technology and Science, Pilani, Rajasthan	Won	
2016	Wildfire of Spring Fest	Indian Institute of Technology Kharagpur, West Bengal		Finalists
2016	Blizzard of Rock of Chaos	Indian Institute of Management Ahmedabad, Gujarat	Won	
2016	Thunder of Radio Dhoom	Ranchi, Jharkhand	Won	
2016	Strawberry Fields (Indian festival)	National Law School of India University, Bangalore, Karnataka		Finalists
2017	Resonance of Festember	National Institute of Technology, Tiruchirappalli, Tamil Nadu	Won	
2017	Thunder of Radio Dhoom	Ranchi, Jharkhand	Won	Best Vocalist and Best Drummer
2017	B-School of Rock of Unmaad	Indian Institute of Management Bangalore, Karnataka		Finalists
2017	Wildfire of Spring Fest	Indian Institute of Technology Kharagpur, West Bengal		Finalists
2017	Wacken Metal Battle of W:O:A, hosted by Bangalore Open Air	Kolkata, West Bengal		Finalists of Eastern India
2017	Synchronicity of Antaragni	Indian Institute of Technology Kanpur, Uttar Pradesh	1st Runner Up	
2017	Till Deaf Do We Part of Pearl (cultural festival)	Birla Institute of Technology and Science, Pilani – Hyderabad Campus, Telangana	Won	
2017	Decibelz of Xpressions	Xavier Institute of Management, Bhubaneswar, Odisha	Won	
2017	Hornbill International Rock Contest	Hornbill Festival, Dimapur, Nagaland		Finalists along with Best Drummer
2017	Livewire of Mood Indigo (festival)	Indian Institute of Technology Bombay, Maharashtra	2nd Runner Up	
2018	Rock-O-Phonix of Alcheringa (festival)	Indian Institute of Technology Guwahati, Assam		Finalists along with Best Stage Presence and Drummer
2018	Decibels of Saarang	Indian Institute of Technology Madras, Tamil Nadu		Finalists
2018	Thundermarch of Incandescene	National Institute of Technology, Silchar, Assam	Won	
2018	Hornbill International Rock Contest	Hornbill Festival, Dimapur, Nagaland		Finalists
2020	Wacken Metal Battle of W:O:A, hosted by Bangalore Open Air	TopCat CCU, Kolkata, West Bengal		Finalists of Eastern India
