= List of heavy metal festivals =

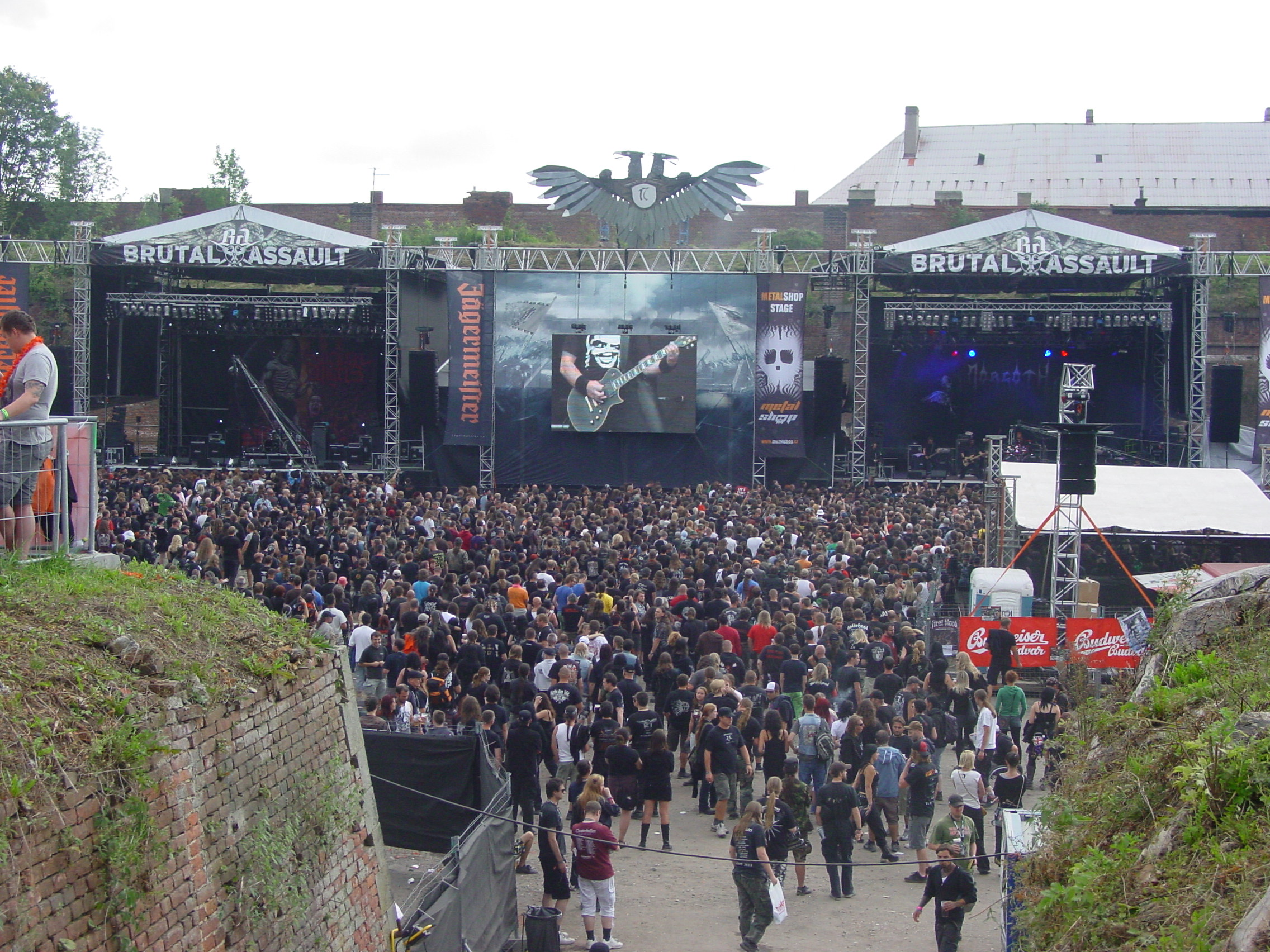
- Brutal Assault 2012

General Information
- Related genres: Heavy metal, punk rock, rock
- Location: Europe and United States (origin); Worldwide (current)
- Related events: Punk rock festival, rock festival

This is an incomplete list of heavy metal festivals. The genre of heavy metal (or simply metal) is a subgenre of rock music that developed in the late 1960s and early 1970s, largely in the United States and the United Kingdom. With roots in blues rock and psychedelic rock, the first heavy metal bands such as Black Sabbath and Deep Purple attracted large audiences, and during the late 1960s and mid-1970s these bands and others in their genre were featured at a number of historic rock festivals. Judas Priest helped spur the genre's evolution by discarding much of its blues influence.

After the genre fused with other related genres such as punk rock in the late 1970s, bands in the new wave of British heavy metal such as Iron Maiden and Saxon followed in a similar vein. Before the end of the decade, heavy metal fans became known as "metalheads" or "headbangers", and there were festivals worldwide, both touring and stationary, dedicated to heavy metal subgenres and heavy metal itself. During the 1980s, glam metal became a commercial force, while Underground scenes and extreme subgenres of metal such as death metal and black metal remained subcultural phenomena, though they have their own dedicated festivals as well. Since the mid-1990s, popular styles have further expanded the definition of the genre.

== Historical heavy metal festivals ==
Historically notable heavy metal festivals held since the 1980s
Festival name	Location	Years	Details
Monsters of Rock	England	1980-1996	music festival held in Castle Donington (later it branched into other locations)
Dynamo Open Air	Netherlands	1986–present	biggest annual metal festival during the 1990s, with 118,000 visitors in 1995
Moscow Music Peace Festival	Russia	1989	part of an era of momentous change in the Soviet Union
Wacken Open Air	Germany	1990–present	larger heavy metal festival
Sweden Rock Festival	Sweden	1992–present	classic rock, hard rock and metal
Graspop Metal Meeting	Belgium	1996–present	larger heavy metal festival
Mangualde Hard Metal Fest	Portugal	1997–present	Oldest heavy metal festival in the Iberian Peninsula. It's also in the top 10 of the oldest heavy metal festivals in the world. Heavy metal, hard rock and punk.
Download Festival	England	2003–present	Hard rock, heavy metal, punk
Bloodstock Open Air	England	2001–present	Heavy Metal festival
Hellfest Summer Open Air	France	2006–present	larger heavy metal festival
Welcome to Rockville	United States	2011–present	The hard rock and heavy metal music festival is the largest rock festival in North America.

== Current heavy metal festivals ==
=== Africa ===
==== Botswana ====
Festival name	Location	Active	Approximate time of year	Notes
Overthrust Winter Metal Mania Festival	Ghanzi	2010–present	May	featuring local and African metal bands

=== Asia ===
==== India ====
Festival name	Location	Active	Approx. time of year	Notes
Bangalore Open Air	Karnataka	2012–present	July	
Thunderstrock Festival	Ranchi, Jharkhand	2008–present	September	

==== Indonesia ====
Festival name	Location	Active	Approx. time of year	Notes
Hammersonic Festival	Jakarta	2012–present	March–April	all heavy music
Hellprint	Bandung	2011–present	November–March	all heavy music
Rock In Celebes	Makassar	2010–present	November	rock genres
Rock in Solo	Surakarta	2004–present	October–November	heritage metal

==== Japan ====
Festival name	Location	Active	Approx. time of year	Notes
Loud Park Festival	Saitama City or Chiba City	2023-present	October	

=== Europe ===
==== Austria ====
Festival name	Location	Active	Month	Audience	Format	Notes
Kaltenbach Open Air	Spital am Semmering	2003–present	August		open-air, 3 days	extreme metal
Nova Rock	Nickelsdorf	2005–present	June	up to 225,000	open-air, 4 days	various rock and metal subgenres

==== Belgium ====
Festival name	Location	Active	Month	Audience	Format	Notes
Graspop Metal Meeting	Dessel	1996–present	June	up to 220,000	open-air, 4 days	one of the biggest metal festivals in Europe
Alcatraz Hard Rock & Metal Festival	Kortrijk	2008–present	August		open-air	
Hell's Balls	Kortrijk	2023–present	November		indoor	organized by the organization of Alcatraz
Huginns Awakening Fest	Oostende	2009–present	April/May			heavy metal, speed metal, thrash metal
Headbanger's Balls Fest	Izegem	2012–present	May			
Blast from the Past Festival	Kuurne	2013–present	December			old school heavy metal
Durbuy Rock	Bomal	1997–present	May			
Hell Open Air	Diest	2023–present	May		open-air	heavy metal and cover festival

==== Bulgaria ====
Festival name	Location	Active	Month	Audience	Format	Notes
Hills of Rock	Plovdiv	2017–2019, 2022, 2024-present	July		open-air	rock, metal, crossover punk

==== Czech Republic ====
Festival name	Location	Active	Month	Audience	Format	Notes
Brutal Assault	Jaroměř (Josefov Fortress)	1996–present	August	up to 20,000	open-air, 4 days	extreme metal, heavy metal, hardcore punk, experimental music
Monsters of Rock	Vizovice	2003–present	July		open-air, 4 days	heavy metal, power metal, speed metal, hard rock
Metalfest	Plzeň	2007–present	June			heavy metal, power metal, death metal
Obscene Extreme	Trutnov	1999–present	July		open-air	grindcore, death metal, hardcore punk
Rock Castle	Moravský Krumlov	2021–present	August			
Basin Fire Fest	Spálené Poříčí	2003–present	June			

==== Denmark ====
Festival name	Location	Active	Month	Audience	Format	Notes
Copenhell	Copenhagen	2010–present	June		open-air, 4 days	all genres of heavy rock and metal
Aalborg Metal Festival	Aalborg	2002–present	November			
Royal Metal Fest	Aarhus	2008–present	April			
Viborg Metal Festival	Viborg	2014–present	March			
Metal Magic Festival	Fredericia	2008–present	July			

==== Estonia ====
Festival name	Location	Active	Month	Notes
Hard Rock Laager	Vana-Vigala	2002–present	June	biggest metal festival in Estonia
Howls of Winter	Tallinn	2014–present	February	black metal

==== Finland ====
Festival name	Location	Active	Month	Audience	Format	Notes
Dark River Festival	Kotka	?	August			
Hellsinki Metal Festival	Helsinki	2023-present	August			
John Smith Rock Festival	Laukaa	2016–present	July			
Nummirock	Kauhajoki	1987–present	June			
Saarihelvetti	Tampere		August			
Steelfest	Hyvinkää	2008–present	May		open-air	black and death metal
Turku Saatanalle	Turku	2011–present	March			black metal
Tuska Open Air	Helsinki	1998–present	July		open-air	all metal subgenres

==== France ====
Festival name	Location	Active	Month	Audience	Format	Notes
Hellfest Summer Open Air	Clisson	2006–present	June	up to 420,000 (60,000 a day)	open-air, 4 days	all metal subgenres
Motocultor Festival	Brittany	2007–present	August			death, black, thrash metal
Plane'R Fest	Colombier-Saugnieu	2012–present	July			
Sylak Open Air	Saint-Maurice-de-Gourdans		August			

==== Germany ====
Festival name	Location	Active	Month	Audience	Format	Notes
Chronical Moshers Open Air	Heinsdorfergrund	1982–present	June	up to 1,000	open-air	extreme metal
Dark Troll Festival	Bornstedt	2009–present	May	1,200	open-air	folk metal, extreme metal
Dong Open Air	Neukirchen-Vluyn	2001–present	July	up to 5,000	open-air	all metal subgenres
Elbriot	Hamburg	2013–present	August	up to 12,000	open-air	all metal subgenres
Euroblast Festival	Cologne	2008–present	October	up to 12,000		progressive metal
Full Force	Löbnitz	1994–present	July	25,000	open-air	all metal subgenres
In Flammen Open Air	Torgau		July	up to 6,000	open-air	extreme metal
Mammut Festival	Königsbrunn	2022–present	March	500		all metal subgenres
Metal Frenzy Open Air	Gardelegen	2014–present	June	up to 5,000	open-air	all metal subgenres
Party.San Metal Open Air	Schlotheim	1996-present	August	up to 10,000	open-air	all metal subgenres
Ragnarök Festival	Lichtenfels, Bavaria	2004–present	April	up to 4000	indoor	pagan metal, folk metal, extreme metal
Rock am Ring and Rock im Park	Nürburgring	1985–present	June	up to 92,000	open-air	various rock and metal subgenres
RockXplosion	Leonberg	1984–present	July	up to 2,000		
Rock Hard Festival	Gelsenkirchen	2003–present	June	7,000	open-air	all metal subgenres
Rockharz Open Air	Ballenstedt	1993/94-present	July	up to 24,000	open-air	all metal subgenres
Rock um zu helfen	Freiberg, Saxony		October			
Reload Festival	Sulingen	2006-present	August	up to 15,000		
Summer Breeze Open Air	Dinkelsbühl	1997–present	August	up to 40,000	open-air	all metal subgenres
Under the Black Sun	Friesack	1997–present	June/July	up to 1000		black metal
Wacken Open Air	Wacken	1990–present	July/August	up to 85,000	open-air, 4 days	biggest metal festival in Germany; all metal subgenres

==== Latvia ====
Festival name	Location	Active	Month	Notes
Zobens un Lemess	Bauska	2014–present	June	folk and pagan metal
Munky Pride	Vandāni	2021–present	July	grindcore, thrash metal, death metal, punk

==== Lithuania ====
Festival name	Location	Active	Month	Notes
Kilkim Žaibu	Varniai	1999–present	June (end)	black metal, folk metal and Viking metal

==== Netherlands ====
Festival name	Location	Active	Month	Audience	Format	Notes
Dynamo Open Air	Eindhoven	1986–present	July		indoor and outdoor	all metal subgenres
Into the Grave	Leeuwarden	2010–present	June			
MidsummerProg	Valkenburg	2017–present	June			
ProgPower Europe	Baarlo	1999–present	October			power metal, progressive metal
Roadburn Festival	Tilburg	1999–present	April		indoor	various metal genres
South of Heaven	Maastricht	2025–present	June			

==== Norway ====
Festival name	Location	Active	Month	Audience	Format	Notes
Beyond the Gates	Bergen	2012–present	August		indoor, 4 days	extreme metal
Inferno Metal Festival	Oslo	2001–present	April		indoor, 4 days	extreme metal
Tons of Rock	Oslo	2014–present	June			
Karmøygeddon Metal Festival	Kopervik	2004–present	May			
Garasjefestival	Reinsvoll	2017–present	July			extreme metal

==== Portugal ====
Festival name	Location	Active	Month	Audience	Format	Notes
HARDMETALFEST	Mangualde	1997–present	January			
Laurus Nobilis Music	Famalicão	2015–present	August			
SWR Barroselas Metalfest	Barroselas	1998–present	April			
Vagos Metal Fest	Calvão	2016–present	August			
Evil Live	Lisbon	2009–present	June			

==== Romania ====
Festival name	Location	Active	Month	Notes
Artmania Festival	Sibiu	2006–present	August	art festival featuring heavy metal
Metalhead Meeting	Bucharest	2013–present	June/July	death metal, black metal, heavy metal
Rockstadt Extreme Festival	Rasnov	2013–present	August	death metal, black metal, heavy metal
Metal Gates Festival	Bucharest	2017–present	November	death metal, black metal, doom metal
Posada Rock Fest	Campulung Muscel	1986–present		

==== Russia ====
Festival name	Location	Active	Month	Notes
Metal Over Russia	Moscow		July	extreme metal, folk metal

==== Slovenia ====
Festival name	Location	Active	Month	Notes
Tolminator	Tolmin	2023–present	July	all styles of metal, attendance capped at 5000 visitors. Spiritual successor to Metaldays and MetalCamp

==== Spain ====
Festival name	Location	Active	Month	Audience	Format	Notes
Barcelona Rock Fest	Barcelona	2014–present	July			featuring hardcore, metalcore, thrash, death, black metal, punk
Leyendas del Rock	Villena	2006–present	August			mostly traditional, thrash, power and gothic metal
Resurrection Fest	Viveiro	2006–present	July		open-air	metalcore, thrash, death, black metal, punk
Rock Imperium	Cartagena, Spain	2022–present	June			mostly traditional, glam, power metal
Z! Live Rock Fest	Zamora, Spain	2016–present	June			mostly traditional, thrash and power metal

==== Sweden ====
Festival name	Location	Active	Month	Notes
House of Metal	Umeå	2007–present	February/March	open-air; all metal subgenres
Sweden Rock Festival	Sölvesborg	1992–present	June	open-air; classic rock, hard rock and metal

==== United Kingdom ====
Festival name	Location	Active	Month	Audience	Format	Notes
Bloodstock Open Air	Walton-on-Trent, England	2005–present	August	20,000	open-air, 3 days	various metal subgenres
Damnation Festival	Manchester, England	2005–present	November	6,000	indoor, 2 days	mainly extreme metal
Download Festival	Donington Park, England	2003–present	June	80,000	open-air, 3 days	largest rock and metal festival in the UK, featuring more mainstream rock, metalcore, heavy metal, and extreme metal
Hard Rock Hell	Great Yarmouth, England	2007–present	November		indoor, 3 days	hard rock and traditional metal festival held at Vauxhall Holiday Resort
Incineration Festival	London, England	2014–present	May		indoor, 1 day	extreme metal festival in Camden Town
Stonedead Festival	Newark-on-Trent	2018–present	August		open-air, 1 day	traditional metal festival

=== North America ===
==== Canada ====
Festival name	Location	Active	Approx. time of year	Notes
Gaspesian Metal Fest	Matane	2018-Present	June	Underground Metal Festival
Hyperspace Metal Festival	Vancouver		April	Canada's premier melodic & power metal festival

==== Mexico ====
Festival name	Location	Active	Approx. time of year	Notes
Candelabrum Metal Fest	León		September	
Hell & Heaven Metal Fest	Mexico City (Toluca)	2010–present	November - December	3 Day Open-Air Metal Festival, featuring death, thrash, black, doom, heavy, power metal & hard rock
México Metal Fest	Monterrey	2016–present	November	1 Day

==== United States ====
Festival name	Location	Active	Approx. time of year	Notes
98RockFest	Tampa, FL	2007–present	April	Metal, grunge and hard rock festival
Aftershock Festival	Sacramento, CA	2012–present	October	Hard rock and heavy metal festival
AURA Fest	Savannah, GA	2017–present	June	All Underground Rock All Day
Hell's Heroes	Houston, TX	2018–present	March	Thrash and epic metal festival
INKcarceration	Mansfield, OH	2018–present	July	Rock music and tattoo festival
Legions of Metal Fest	Chicago, IL	2017–present	June	
Louder Than Life	Louisville, KY	2014–present	September	Hard rock/heavy metal festival
Mad With Power Fest	Madison, WI	2018–present	August	Power Metal/Traditional Heavy Metal festival
Maryland Deathfest	Baltimore, MD	2003–present	May	Extreme Music
Mass Destruction Metal Fest	Atlanta, GA	2017–present	November	Extreme Metal Festival
Milwaukee Metal Fest	Milwaukee, WI	1987–2004, 2023–present	May	
New England Metal and Hardcore Festival	Worcester, MA	1999–2018, 2023–present	September	
ProgPower USA	Atlanta, GA	2001–present	September	Progressive and Power Metal
Rocklahoma	Pryor, OK	2007–present	September	Hard rock and metal festival
Sick New World	Las Vegas, NV	2023–present	April	Nu-Metal Fest
Sonic Temple	Columbus, OH	2019, 2023–present	May	Hard rock and metal festival
Welcome to Rockville	Daytona Beach, FL	2011–present	April/May	Hard rock and heavy metal music festival

== Tours ==
The following is an incomplete list of traveling metal festivals, both active and defunct:

- 70000 Tons of Metal
- Clash of the Titans
- Crüe Fest
- Family Values Tour
- Doomination
- G3
- Gigantour
- Headbangers Boat
- Jägermeister Music Tour
- Knotfest
- Magic Circle Festival
- Mayhem Festival
- Metal Masters Tour
- Monsters of Rock Cruise
- No Mercy Festival
- Ozzfest
- Sonisphere
- The Summer Slaughter Tour
- Taste Of Chaos
- The Unholy Alliance
- Uproar Festival
- X-Mass Festival

== Heavy metal festivals that are no longer active ==
=== Europe ===
Festival name	Location	Active	Approx. time of year	Notes
MetalDays	(Slovenia) Tolmin / Velenje	2004–2023	July/August	Metal festival featuring death, black, folk, thrash, doom metal. 2012 was the last year the name Metalcamp was used before it was changed to MetalDays in 2013.
Kavarna Rock Fest	(Bulgaria) Kavarna	2006-2016	June/July	Hard rock and metal festival. Until 2010 the festival's name was Kaliakra Rock Fest.

== See also ==
- List of music festivals
- Heavy metal music
