= Tantra (disambiguation) =

Tantra is an esoteric tradition in Hinduism and Buddhism.

Tantra, Tantras, or Tantric may also refer to:

== Religion ==
- Buddhist tantric literature, the vast and varied literature of the Vajrayana Buddhist traditions
- Hindu tantric literature, esoteric scriptures in Hinduism
- Neotantra, a Western new religious movement influenced by the Eastern esoteric spiritual traditions of Tantra
- Tantric massage, a form of bodywork that may incorporate principles derived from Tantra
- Tantric sex, any of a range of practices in Hindu and Buddhist tantra that utilize sexual activity in a ritual or yogic context
- Tibetan tantric practice, the main tantric practices in Tibetan Buddhism
- Vajrayana, a Mahayana Buddhist tradition that emphasizes esoteric practices and rituals aimed at rapid spiritual awakening

== Arts and entertainment ==
=== Film and television ===
- Tantra (film), a 2024 Indian film
- Tantra (TV series), an Indian television series

=== Music ===
- Tantra (album), a 2022 album by Yung Bleu
- Tantric (band), an American rock band
  - Tantric (album), a 2001 album by Tantric

=== Other uses in arts and entertainment ===
- Tantra (comics), a Marvel Comics character
- Tantras (module), a 1989 module for the Dungeons & Dragons role-playing game
- Tantras (novel), a 1989 novel by Scott Ciencin

== Other uses ==
- Sinta Tantra (born 1979), British artist
- Tantra (Kolkata), a nightclub in Kolkata, India
- Tantra (spider), a genus of spiders in the family Theridiosomatidae
