= I Rock (disambiguation) =

I Rock may refer to

- I Rock television show
- Independence Rock Festival in Mumbai
