= Thunderstrock Festival =

Indian heavy metal music festival

- Genre: Heavy metal music, hard rock
- Dates: 2nd or 3rd weekend in September
- Locations: Ranchi, Jharkhand, India
- Years active: 2008 - Present
- Website: Youtube

Thunderstrock Festival is a heavy metal music festival which takes place in Ranchi of Jharkhand, India. Thunderstrock is a Do-It-Yourself (DIY) and charity concert and its idea is to support and encourage the live bands along with the hard rock and heavy metal music listeners of Ranchi and the state of Jharkhand in India. Simultaneously, the idea is to donate the income generated from the sale of tickets to groups (or NGOs) working for the welfare of society.

== History ==
=== Beginning in 2008 ===
The idea of Thunderstrock emerged back in the year 2008, the idea was to generate funds for Jharkhand Rock Music Association (JRMA) so that JRMA could further plan concerts for rock bands of Ranchi. The initiative was further taken up by band members from Kaalmantra, Genesis and Sonu Chhetry from the band Sparsh, which were the prominent bands of that time. The first season of Thunderstrock was held in August 2008 at Hotel Ashok in Ranchi. As the initiators for the concept of Thunderstrock, Kaalmantra and Genesis took up the stage that year. These bands were already famous with the rock music lovers of Ranchi, hence the footfall for the concert was immense and the show managed to fetch around Rs. 25,000 (around $580, according to exchange rates for 2008) which was later donated to JRMA by Mr K.C. Shashidhar, the Chief General Manager of NABARD (National Bank for Agriculture and Rural Development).

Thunderstrock 2008 Lineup
Kaalmantra
Genesis

=== Second edition in 2009 ===
The second season happened in July 2009. Kaalmantra, Genesis and JRMA being the organizers this time. The event was brought forward with an agenda of spreading awareness among youth on the evils of alcoholism and child labour. Along with that, the festival was organized with an intention to support Yuwa-India which is an NGOs that empowers girls by combating child marriage, illiteracy and human trafficking in Jharkhand through football and education. This season also featured bands like Hypnotize, Kaos and none other than Sparsh which was the leading rock band of Ranchi back then. The show was a huge success and again it collected Rs. 25,000 ($543, according to the exchange rates of 2010) and a donation was made to Yuwa-India after the show.

Thunderstrock 2009 Lineup
Hynotize
Kaos
Sparsh

=== Break in between 2010-2014 ===
By the end of 2010s came the downfall in the audience count for rock and metal music in Ranchi. This really affected the footfall of the audience in the festival especially in a city like Ranchi which is a small city and has not much of people listening to rock and metal music. Also, the initiators of the festival got jobs and moved on leaving the festival for a break. Even though Thunderstrock as a proper festival never happened in these years but the concept and the idea were used to organize other small scale DIY event in the city. The gap was witnessed with the rise of other Do-It-Yourself (DIY) festivals in the city which followed the same momentum in which this festival was started.

=== Start after a gap in 2014 and complete silence till 2017 ===
The fourth season happened on 7 September 2014 and from here on, Highway 69's vocalist Tarang Kerketta took the initiative of organizing this festival. For the first time, it was organized in an open-air style which experienced a footfall of around 2500. The season featured bands like Death Note (present-day Reciprocal), Destiny (present-day Iris 13), Virus, Error 404, Highway 69, Genesis and the leading rock band of Darjeeling named Head Motif. The donations of that year went to Harmu Football Academy.

Having organized this festival on such a large scale for the first time, the next season in 2015 could not be conducted as there was a shortage of funds as the festival has got no backing from sponsors which is the major barrier to organizing this festival annually. This one year gap in 2015 led to the failure of organizing this festival in 2016 and 2017 as well. Also, a reason being that the initiator Tarang Kerketta was very much occupied with Highway 69 shows across India.

Thunderstrock 2014 Lineup
Death Note (now Reciprocal)
Destiny (now Iris 13)
Virus
Error 404
Highway 69
Genesis
Head Motif (Headliners from Darjeeling)

=== 2018 and 2019 ===
After four years of silence, the thunder struck again and Thunderstrock festival took place on 23 September 2018 in which What Escapes Me from Kolkata was the headliners along with Astitva (present-day Existence), Genesis and Highway 69 in the line-up. Unlike the previous year, where the festival was advertised and promoted in the newspapers and social media, the festival in 2018 lacked in these aspects. Also on the same day, there was a cultural festival going in St. Xavier's College, Ranchi which pulled a lot of audience football. Even though the festival experienced a strong footfall of 1500 people and it is actually a huge number in a city like Ranchi and especially in a time when the metal music scene is completely down in all over India and people usually don't turn up to attend or buy the tickets to a metal music concert.

Thunderstrock 2018 Lineup
Astitva (now Existence)
Genesis
Highway 69
What Escapes Me (Headliners from Kolkata)

The 2019 line-up had the initiators of this festival that is Sparsh (rebranded as Sparsh 2.0) from Ranchi, modern metal band Reciprocal from Ranchi who have performed in 2014 under the name Death Note, math-rock (with Djent elements) band Bipolar Shadows all the way from Gangtok, Sikkim, progressive metal band Cross Affinity from Bhubaneswar, Odisha and folk metal band Atript as the headliners from Jamshedpur, Jharkhand. The bands Bipolar Shadows and Cross Affinity were chosen by the festival's manager, Tarun Paul Kachhap along with the band members of Highway 69 based on their performance at Battle of Bands competitions held in Kalinga Institute of Industrial Technology, Bhubaneswar and Indian Institute of Technology (Indian School of Mines), Dhanbad respectively. This time the festival was organized in a new location which had a parking space problem along with that on the same day (just like the previous year), there was a cultural festival going in St. Xavier's College, Ranchi just which pulled a lot of audience football. The festival experienced a downfall in the audience and had 700-800 audience count.

Thunderstrock 2019 Lineup
Reciprocal (earlier Death Note)
Cross Affinity (from Bhubaneswar)
Bipolar Shadows (from Gangtok)
Sparsh
Atript (Headliners from Jamshedpur)

== Present ==
The Festival today stands as a Do-It-Yourself (DIY) heavy metal charity concert in Eastern India which is completely funded by the organizers and the profits are used for charitable purposes. The festival is dedicated to bringing independent and newly emerging live acts based in rock, metal and its sub-genres along with helping the groups and NGOs working in the welfare of the society. The festival aims at making itself as a popular music festival just like NH7 Weekender, Bangalore Open Air, Control Alt Delete, Great Indian Rock, Independence Rock Festival etc and to highlight Ranchi on India's music concert map. They are now gearing up for 2020, with bringing the first-ever Battle of Bands competition organized by Thunderstrock Festival called "#RoadToThunderstrock".

== Commitments ==
=== Road To Thunderstrock ===
Road To Thunderstrock (often stylized as #RoadToThunderstrock) is a band contest which was started in 2020. The participating bands have to compete against each other at the Road To Thunderstrock and shortlisted top two finalists perform as the opening act during the Thunderstrock Festival where the best one is declared as the winner of the festival. The very first season of the competition was scheduled to be held in April 2020 but due to the COVID-19 pandemic in India the country experienced a nationwide lockdown which postponed the event. The festival received entries not only from their home ground Ranchi or the nearby city of Jamshedpur but from many cities like Bangalore, Bhubaneswar, Delhi, Gangtok, Kolkata, Shillong and even from the neighbouring country of Nepal.

As the festival is a charitable event so there is no cash price money or recording deals that can be offered to the winners. The winners receive is a medal and certificate and the festival is looking forward to reimbursing the travel, food and stay expenses of the finalist bands if the budget allows them.

=== Charity work ===
Thunderstrock Festival was started with the initiative to promote music as well as to help the people in need. Every year the income generated from the festival is donated to various groups and organizations that are working in the welfare of the society. In the early years of the festival, the money was donated to Jharkhand Rock Music Association (JRMA) so that JRMA can organize more music festivals that can promote the live music culture in Jharkhand. Later on, the festival worked with Yuwa-India in 2009-2010. Since 2014, the festival is working with Harmu Football Academy and donates the income generated to the academy who in return buy the necessary sports equipment for the players in the academy and the festival also gives free entry to the students of the academy at the festival.
