= Indus Creed =

Indian rock band

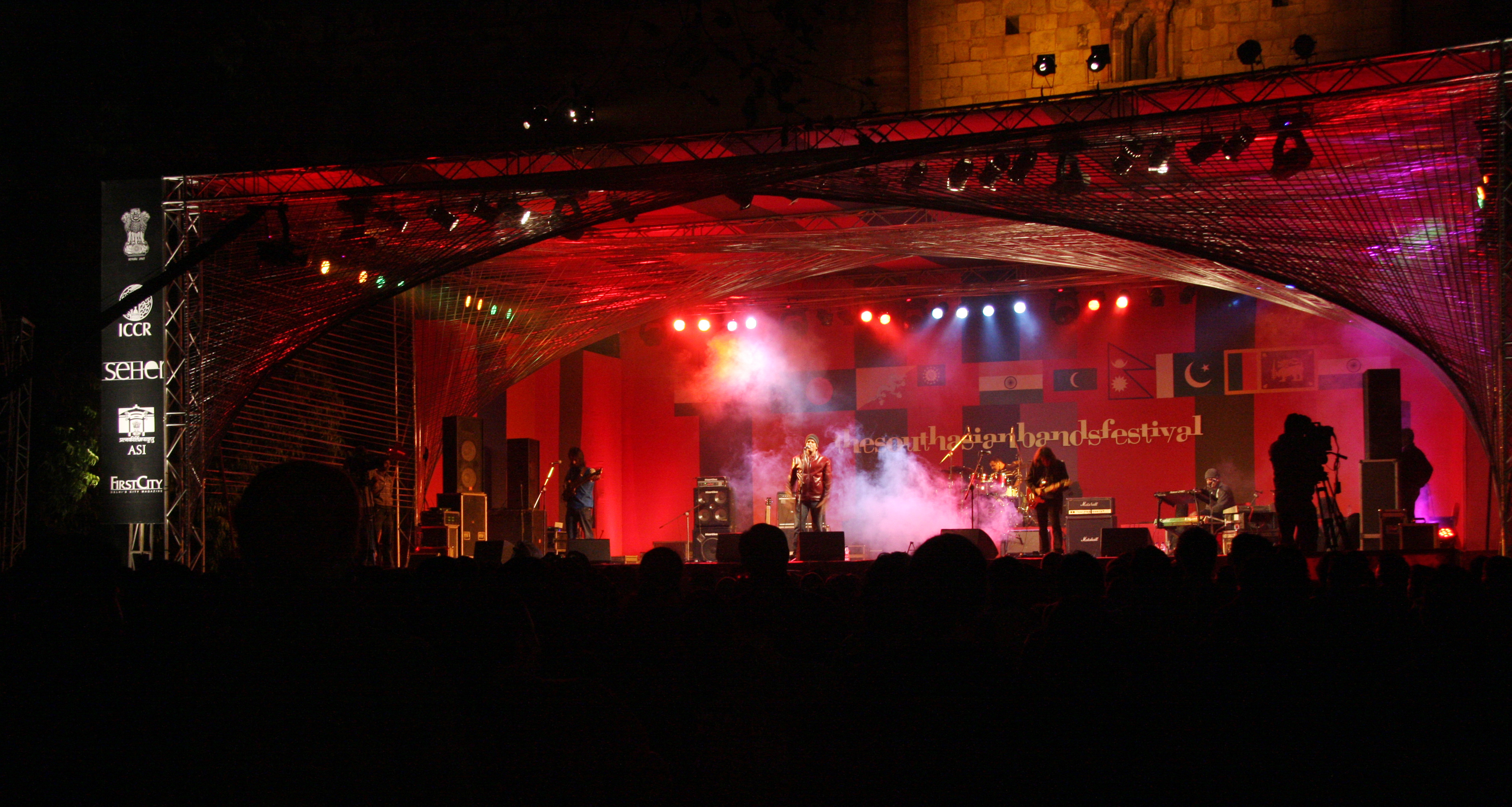
- Indus Creed performing in 2010

Background information
- Origin: Mumbai, India
- Genres: Rock; alternative rock
- Years active: 1984–1997; 2010–present
- Members: Uday Benegal; Zubin Balaporia; Krishna Jhaveri; Jai Row Kavi
- Past members: Ian Santamaria; Aftab Currim; Suresh Bhadricha; Mark Menezes; Mark Selwyn; Bobby Duggal; Adrian Fernandes; Jayesh Gandhi; Rushad Mistry; Shri; Mahesh Tinaikar
- Website: induscreed.net

Indus Creed is an Indian rock band based in Mumbai. The group was founded in 1984 as Rock Machine and renamed in 1993. They disbanded in 1997, only to regroup in 2010 with a new lineup.

In its 2014 listing of "25 Greatest Indian Rock Songs of the last 25 Years", Rolling Stone India featured the band's songs "Top of the Rock" (1988) and "Pretty Child" (1990).

== History ==
=== Rock Machine ===
Indus Creed was originally called Rock Machine, a group formed in 1984 by Mahesh Tinaikar (lead guitar), Mark Selwyn (bass), Ian Santamaria (vocals), Aftab Currim (rhythm guitar), and Suresh Bhadricha (drums). After playing just a few concerts in 1984, the lineup went through some changes. Jayesh Gandhi replaced Currim, Mark Menezes took Bhadricha's chair, and Uday Benegal took over from Santamaria as lead vocalist. A few months later, Zubin Balaporia joined the band, adding keyboards. Tinaikar, Selwyn, Gandhi, Benegal, and Balaporia remained the core members of the band for a major portion of its existence.

Rock Machine started out as a cover band, playing a mix of mainstream rock and hard rock by such bands as Thin Lizzy, UFO, The Who, Deep Purple, Van Halen, and Rush. Rock Machine were one of the earliest bands in India to tour the country extensively, performing at colleges and independent rock festivals. The band eventually began to write and perform their own songs.

In 1988, Rock Machine released their first album, Rock'n'Roll Renegade. Hailed as India's first all-original rock album, it was a major success. The band's follow-up album, The Second Coming, was released in 1990 and featured a more slickly produced sound than their debut.

In 1992, Mark Menezes left Rock Machine and was replaced by drummer Bobby Duggal.

=== Indus Creed ===
Seeking a change of image and sound from that of a college-style band to a more internationally suited one, Rock Machine changed their name to Indus Creed in 1993. They began to experiment with Indian instruments, such as the tabla and sarangi. They also released a video to the song "Pretty Child", which became a hit and won the band an MTV Asia Video Music Award.

In 1995, Indus Creed released their first album under the new name. The band also published two music videos from the self-titled record, "Trapped" and "Sleep". The drummer's chair saw yet another change when Bobby Duggal was replaced in 1995 by Adrian Fernandes.

=== Disbandment ===
Disillusioned with the way the music industry was changing in India, and with some members keen to embark on other musical pursuits, Indus Creed split up in 1997. Uday Benegal and Jayesh Gandhi moved to New York City at the end of 1999 with their new fusion rock band, Alms for Shanti, and released an eponymous album in 2000.

=== Reunion ===
In 2008, Uday Benegal relocated back to Mumbai, where he and Mahesh Tinaikar teamed up to create the acoustic project Whirling Kalapas. In 2010, Benegal and Tinaikar regrouped with ex-bandmate Zubin Balaporia to reform Indus Creed. They recruited bass player Rushad Mistry and drummer Jai Row Kavi to complete the outfit, now down to a five-piece from the original six-member group. The newly formed Indus Creed was officially launched on 7 October 2010, when they headlined Harley-Davidson's Harley Rock Riders concert at Hard Rock Cafe Mumbai. In December 2010, the band embarked on their Reboot Tour, headlining concerts and festivals across India, including the Cherrapunjee Indigenous Festival in Meghalaya, Harley Rock Riders finale in New Delhi, Independence Rock Festival XXV in Mumbai, and the South Asian Bands Festival in New Delhi. In June 2011, Indus Creed was inducted into the Indian Recording Arts Academy Hall of Fame.

=== Evolve (2012) ===
Indus Creed released Evolve, their first album in seventeen years, on 21 April 2012, through Universal Music. Featuring eight songs, the album was produced by Indus Creed, mixed by Grammy-nominated mixing engineer Tim Palmer, and mastered by Andy VanDette. The band was subsequently featured on the cover of a number of magazines, including Rolling Stone India's February 2012 issue.

Indus Creed was the big winner at the Jack Daniel's JD Rock Awards 2013, held at Mehboob Studios in Mumbai, taking home Best Band, Best Keyboardist, and Best Drummer trophies for their album Evolve. They had been nominated in seven categories, including Best Album, Best Song, Best Vocalist, and Best Guitarist.

Mahesh Tinaikar died in October 2026 in Mumbai, following a suspected heart attack, at the age of 63.

== Band members ==
Current

- Uday Benegal – vocals, guitars, programming
- Zubin Balaporia – keyboards, vocals
- Krishna Jhaveri – bass, vocals
- Jai Row Kavi – drums, vocals

Past

- Mahesh Tinaikar – guitars, vocals
- Ian Santamaria – vocals
- Aftab Currim – guitar
- Suresh Bhadricha – drums
- Mark Selwyn – bass
- Mark Menezes – drums
- Bobby Duggal – drums
- Adrian Fernandes – drums
- Jayesh Gandhi – guitar
- Rushad Mistry – bass, vocals
- Shri – percussion

== Discography ==
=== Rock Machine ===
- Rock'n'Roll Renegade (1988)
- The Second Coming (1990)

=== Indus Creed ===
- Indus Creed (1995)
- Evolve (2012)
