= Girish and the Chronicles =

Indian rock band

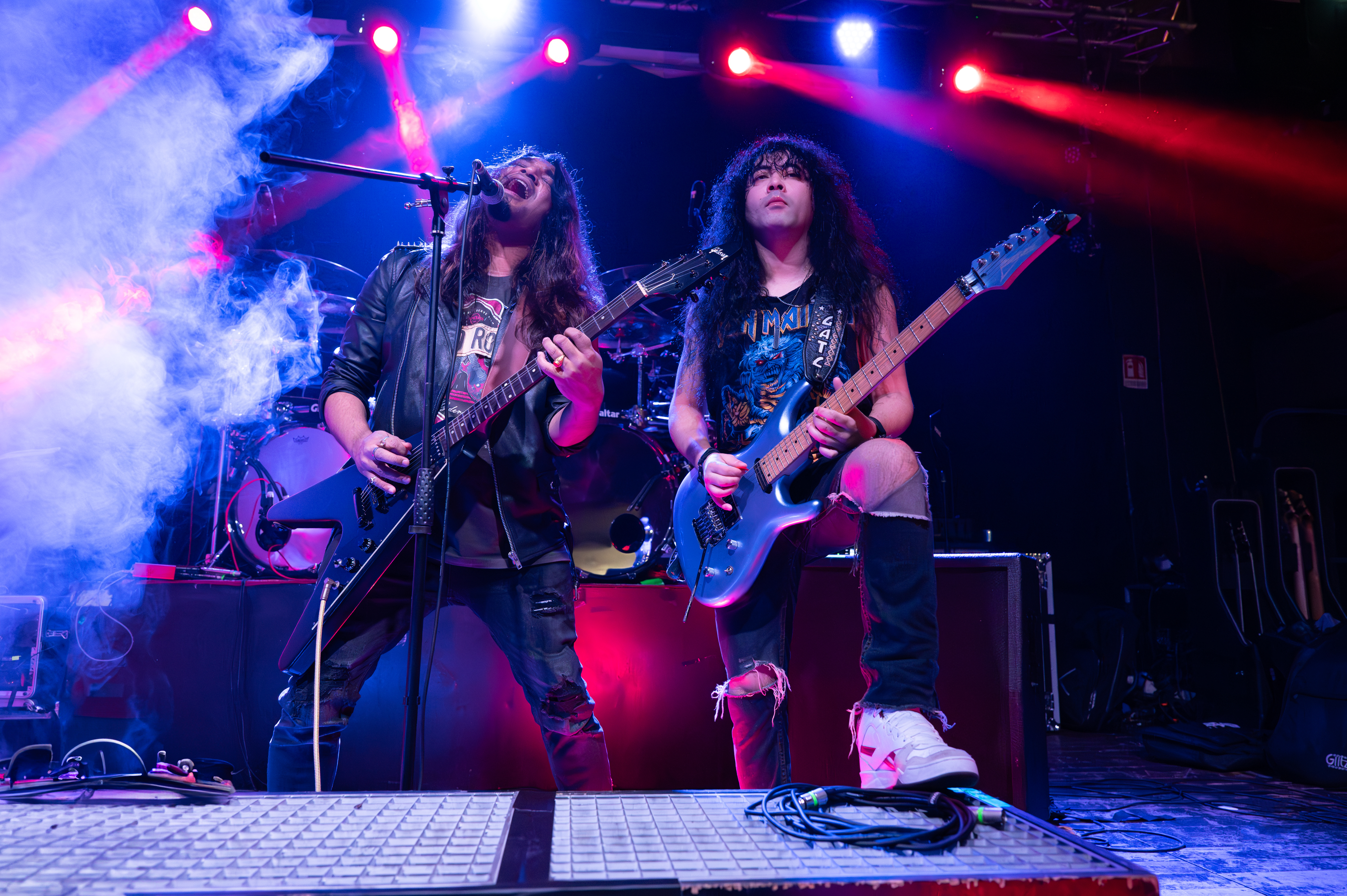
- Girish Pradhan (left) and Suraz Sun (right) live in Italy in 2024

Background information
- Also known as: GATC
- Origin: Sikkim, India
- Genres: Hard rock, heavy metal, melodic rock, glam metal
- Years active: 2009–present
- Labels: Universal Music India, Lions Pride Music (Denmark), Frontiers Records
- Members: Girish Pradhan; Suraz Karki; Yogesh Pradhan; Nagen Mongrati
- Website: girishandthechronicles.com

Girish and the Chronicles, also sometimes known simply as GATC, is an Indian rock band from Sikkim, India, formed in 2009, by vocalist Girish Pradhan. The line-up consists of Girish Pradhan on the vocals, Yogesh Pradhan on the bass, Suraz Karki on the lead guitars and Nagen Mongrati on the drums. They have been based in Bengaluru, Karnataka, since 2013. The band has three studio albums to their name.

GATC have opened for/shared stage with/supported and shared performances in festivals with, Hoobastank (2013), Poets of the Fall (St. John's Medical College, Bangalore, 2016), Destruction (Bangalore Open Air, 2014), TesseracT (IISc Bangalore, 2019) over the years, and have also backed Chris Adler in his The Chris Adler Experience tour, in India, in 2019.

In recent years, the band has supported/shared stage with Nazareth, (2021, UrRock Fest, Sarnen, Switzerland), Skid Row, Kamelot (UrRock Festival, Switzerland, 2022), Bonfire, Mike Tramp (Zurbaran Rock Burgos fest, Spain 2022, 2023 respectively).

The band supported Guns N' Roses at Etihad Arena in Abu Dhabi (1 July 2023), as special guests. The news garnered a lot of attention in the Indian rock scene with the band getting extensive coverage from press and media, such as The Times of India and Rolling Stone India.

On June 24, 2023, the band opened for bands such as Bullet for My Valentine, Billy Talent, and Alter Bridge on day 2 of Summerside Festival held in Grenchen, Switzerland. The festival also featured other bands such as Hollywood Vampires and Airbourne.

== Release history ==
=== Early releases and Back on Earth: 2009—2016 ===
The band released their first ever promotional demo single, "Angel", in 2009, in CD format. It was re-released in January 2010 with The North Eastern Times Magazine's, The Great Eastern Rock Vol. 2, CD compilation. It was followed by a series of demos and single releases between 2011 and 2013, with songs such as "The Golden Crown", "Loaded", "A New Beginning", and "Yesteryears", mostly on their YouTube Channel.

The band released their debut album Back on Earth in 2014, with Universal Music Group, India.

The plans to release a debut album had been a long overdue for the band, since their jamming days in 2006. They had already independently released several singles on their YouTube channel (from 2009 to 2012).

In the middle of 2013, the band successfully got in touch with Universal Music India and got a deal to release an album, with some help from their management at the time. They further wrote a few newer songs such as "End of Civilization" and "Born With a Big Attitude". They also finished recording some older demos such as "Revolving Barrel". The entire rhythm guitar section was re-recorded with Les Pauls, replacing the earlier Fender Stratocaster + Telecaster versions. The album was named Back on Earth and was finally released internationally via Universal Music India, with the video for "Angel" being featured on VH1 along with a six-city Hard Rock Cafe tour.

The album did not make a large impact and it failed to reach the intended audience, according to the band. Later on, the entire album was shot with Music Mojo (Kappa TV) and was released on their YouTube channel, which helped the songs reach out to a wider audience. At around 2019, the band got in touch with the label and decided to take down the album from all the streaming platforms, as they felt that a reissue was much needed in the future. It was in 2023, the band finally re-released a re-recorded version of the album, with Frontiers Records.

The band released their single, "Endless Road", in 2016, in collaboration with the clothing company Roadster Life Company. Meant originally as an anthem for the company in their campaign, it gave the band a wide exposure to the Indian audience, with over 2 million views on the video. The band also took an Indian folk rock approach on the songwriting. It was shot at the Rann of Kutch, a salt desert in the state of Gujarat.

=== Rock the Highway: 2018—2020 ===
The band released a video for their new single "Rock the Highway" on New Year's Eve in December 2018. It was first featured on the Canadian web magazine, Sleaze Roxx. The band was approached by a Denmark-based record label, Lion's Pride for a new album.

They released their second album, Rock the Highway, with Lions Pride Music, in April 2020.

The idea of releasing a second GATC album had been building up for many years, since Back on Earth. It became concrete with the band releasing the title-track. Soon after, the band was approached by Lions Pride Music for an album deal. It was perfect timing, as the band had already written many demos and were ready to start recording a new album. The album release date was set to 27 April 2020 and it was to be named Rock the Highway.

After a year, the band released a video for "Rock 'n' Roll Is Here to Stay", officially announcing Rock the Highway, on 29 March 2020. It was filmed by Cary Hubbs, a Prague-based film maker, originally from Los Angeles, during his visit to Bengaluru, India. Axl Rosenberg of MetalSucks wrote: "It sounds exactly like something Riki Rachtman woulda played on Headbanger's Ball in the late '80s or early '90s, and I mean that in the best possible way". The song received praises from prominent names in the world of metal, such as Chris Adler and Thomas Gabriel. Girish Pradhan had also already joined Firstborne, a side project led by Chris Adler along with James LoMenzo and Myrone by then.

Rock the Highway was finally released on 27 April 2020, with the video for "Identity Crisis". Sleaze Roxx was one of the first to feature the song, along with Rolling Stone India.

The latter wrote: "Standing at about one hour and four minutes, Bengaluru-based, Gangtok bred act Girish and the Chronicles' new album Rock the Highway is pretty much pure mayhem for any fan of Eighties rock and metal. Across 13 songs that don't bow down to any gimmicks and offer everything from glam metal to rock 'n roll, frontman Girish Pradhan is at his soaring, pitch-perfect best."

MetalSucks listed Rock the Highway third position in 'Vince Neilstein's Top 15 Metal Albums of 2020'.

Other magazines listed the album as one of the top rated album released that year.

=== Hail to the Heroes: 2022 ===
The band released their third studio album, Hail to the Heroes, on 11 February 2022, via Frontiers Records.

In early 2021, the band signed a multi-album deal with Frontiers. With that, GATC became the first ever Indian band to get signed by the label.

The band released their first single, "Lovers' Train", off their upcoming album, with Frontiers on 11 November 2021. The band were in Switzerland, for UrRock Festival during its release and also performed this song live out there.

Soon after, GATC released a music video for "Primeval Desire", on 2 December 2021, also announcing Hail to the Heroes. Axl Rosenburg of MetalSucks wrote: "Get ready to party like it's 1989: Girish and the Chronicles, who are arguably the best hair metal band out there right now, have released a new song called "Primeval Desire.""

Their third release and their second music video, also the title track to the album was released on 14 January 2022. It was featured on Metal Injection which wrote, "The single pays tribute to the rock and metal heroes of the '80s that have sadly left this world while also offering a positive message of unity. As for the music, it does an excellent job of memorializing the legends that have gone before us all". The videos for both songs were shot by Prabal Deep Das at different locations in Bengaluru and Goa.

On 11 February 2022, the band released the video for "Love's Damnation", also announcing the album.

=== "Kaal" and fourth album: 2024—present ===
The band released a new single, "Kaal", on the 5 November 2024, amidst their Europe/UK tour named “Re-Ignition tour”, in November, which lasted for 40 days, covering parts of Sweden, Finland, Germany, Switzerland, Netherlands, Spain, France and the UK (London and Scotland). The band also visited India, for a notable performance at the Independence Rock Festival, held at Bayview Lawns in Mumbai, before returning to Spain to complete the remainder of the tour. 2024 saw them tour multiple countries in Europe, with also being a part of multiple festivals. This also includes their tour in Belgium/Germany/France during May.

The band is already set to perform at the Frontiers Rock Festival in Italy, with melodic metal legends like Winger, Bonfire, Mike Tramp’s Whitelion, Harem Scarem and more; And Milagre Metaleiro Open Air in Portugal in 2025, with Metal legends like Rotting Christ and Hypocrisy.

The band is also working on a new album.

In June 2025, the band was featured on season 20 of America's Got Talent. They performed "Set Fire to the Rain" by Adele. They received a standing ovation and a "yes" from judges Simon Cowell, Sofía Vergara, Mel B, and Howie Mandel to advance to the live shows.

== Members ==
- Girish Pradhan – Vocals/Guitars
- Suraz Sun – Lead guitars
- Yogesh Pradhan – Bass guitars/Chief studio producer/Keyboards(Studio)
- Nagen Mongranti – Drums

== Discography ==
- Rock the Highway (2020)
- Hail to the Heroes (2022)
- Back on Earth (2023)
- Disintegrate (2026)

=== Singles ===
- "Endless Road" (2016)
- "Rock the Highway" (2019)
- "Lovers' Train" (Nov 2021)
- "Primeval Desire" (Music Video, Dec 2021)
- "Hail to the Heroes" (Music Video, Jan 2022)
- "Love's Damnation" (Music Video, Feb 2022)
- Ride To Hell (2023)
- Loaded (2023)
- "Kaal" (November 2023)
- Disintegrate (2026)
- A New Spark (2026)
- Fading Away (2026)

== See also ==
- Kryptos (band)
- Bhayanak Maut
- Nicotine (band)
- Inner Sanctum (band)
- Demonic Resurrection
