= Chronic Xorn =

Indian metalcore band

- Chronic Xorn Logo

Background information
- Origin: Kolkata, West Bengal, India
- Genres: Metalcore, Melodic Death Metal
- Years active: 2007–present
- Labels: Six Inch Nails, Rooh Music
- Members: Sunny; Suvam; Biswarup; Kanad Roy; Mamik Bannerjee
- Past members: Tamaghna; Anindya; Angshuman; Soumyadeep; Dipayan; Abhinav; Jeet; Sambit
- Website: www.chronicxorn.com

Chronic Xorn (Bengali: ক্রনীক জর্ন), is a metal band, based in Kolkata, India. Chronic Xorn started in 2007, and shot to prominence after being featured in October 2009 in Headbanger's India.

== History ==
=== Early years (2007–2009) ===
In 2010, Chronic Xorn was signed by Six Inch Nails Records, making them the first band to receive a record label from Eastern India and has released its debut album entitled Death Destruction on May 14, 2010. Chronic Xorn has a history of playing alongside supporting bands like Parkway Drive (Australia), Nervo Chaos (Brazil) and Indian heavy weights like Demonic Resurrection, Kryptos, Scribe and many more. The band has also played in 2010 at the Summer Storm Festival supporting Nothnegal (Singapore), Festival headlined by Lamb Of God.

In October Chronic Xorn went on a tour across Indian cities. Bangalore, Chennai, Mumbai, Kolkata, Guwahati and Shillong. To promote their album From Mercy. The band played at festivals sharing the stage with international acts like Children of Bodom, Dawn of Demise Cypher 16 and Gone In April. They also performed alongside metal bands such, as Bhayanak Maut and Demonic Resurrection. The festival line-ups included artists from genres like Raghu Dixit, Shaa'ir & Func Indian Ocean, Sunidhi Chauhan and Javed Ali. Travis Montgomery, a member of the Canada metal band Threat Signal played a guest guitar solo on the title track of the album From Mercy.

Chronic Xorn is the first metal band in India to release an album from a commercial record label and is the first band to have the physical body circulation in the music stores throughout India, since albums by Indian metal bands are not available physically in the music stores in India.

=== Death Destruction Sermon (2009–2010) ===
Death Destruction Sermon

EP by Chronic Xorn
- Released: July 27, 2010
- Recorded: 2010
- Genre: Melodic Metalcore
- Length: 25:45
- Label: Six Inch Nails
- Producer: Chronic Xorn

Death Destruction Sermon is their latest EP which was released in 2010. The EP consists of six tracks and the full-length of the EP is 00:25:45. The EP is one of the highest selling heavy metal albums in India and has even been sold at various parts of Europe and USA. The EP received good ratings from both the European and Indian music magazines.

==== Track listing ====
No.	Title	Writer(s)	Length
1.	"My Little Obsession"	Chronic Xorn	4:22
2.	"Necropolis"	Chronic Xorn	5:16
3.	"Death.Destruction.Sermon"	Chronic Xorn	4:55
4.	"The Funeral Song"	Chronic Xorn	4:20
5.	"Afraid of the Unseen"	Chronic Xorn	3:57
6.	"Psychic Catastrophe"	Chronic Xorn	2:55

== Critical reception ==
Sputnikmusic Score:

Upon its release, Death Destruction Sermon was met with mostly positive response.

In a positive review of the album, Anshul Kaushal at SputnikMusic said the album "stands tall as the first metal album from East India and one of the finest in the genre by an Indian band"

=== From Mercy (2010–2012) ===
Chronic Xorn released their debut album From Mercy on 3 October 2012. The album consists of eleven tracks. There are two tracks "Necropolis" and "Death Destruction Sermon", which are the remakes of their previous EP released in 2010. The album also features "Travis Montgomery" from the band Threat Signal, Canada, playing a guest solo for the track "From Mercy". Various songs from this album were aired in Full Metal Racket Radio Show, 103.2 Preston FM (United Kingdom), Planet Metal Radio Show (France), Painkiller Metal Show (Belgium), The Pit Radio Show (United Kingdom), Washington Bangla Radio (India).

==== Track listing ====
No.	Title	Writer(s)	Length
1.	"Regression"	Chronic Xorn	2:45
2.	"Die"	Chronic Xorn	4:17
3.	"Necropolis"	Chronic Xorn	5:16
4.	"Surge Of Guilt"	Chronic Xorn	4:59
5.	"From Mercy"	Chronic Xorn
6.	"Wrath’s Black Rain"	Chronic Xorn	4:39
7.	"Bleeding"	Chronic Xorn	4:37
8.	"Valentine Of Nightmares"	Chronic Xorn	4:13
9.	"Deliverance"	Chronic Xorn	2:05
10.	"Lick It To Die"	Chronic Xorn	4:52
11.	"Death Destruction Sermon"	Chronic Xorn	4:55

=== Touring and side projects (2012–present) ===
They were a part of FIREBALL 2012 which is one of the biggest music festivals held in the north east India. On March 28, 2012, the band announced their opening up of their own music school, Xorn School of Music (XSM), to educate about metalcore and maybe even heavy metal music. On April 18, 2013, the band headlined in EKSTASI 2013 held at Camellia School Of Engineering & Technology and on May 4, 2013, they performed at Eclecia 2013, Heritage Institute of Technology. On 23 August 2013, they headlined the EASTERN DARKFEST at Dhaka, Bangladesh, along with many other international bands, Lotus Of Darkness (Thailand), Godsire (Singapore) and Brothers (Bangladesh), Satanik, Sent Men Revolt, Stygian Oath.

== Band members ==
Current members

- Sunny (Vocals)
- Suvam (Guitar/vocals)
- Biswarup (Guitar)
- Kanad Roy (Bass Guitar)
- Mamik (Drums)

Former members

- Tamaghna (Drums)
- Anindya (Guitar)
- Abhinav (Guitar)
- Jeet (Bass Guitar)
- Sambit (Drums)
- Angshuman (Bass Guitar)
- Soumyadeep (Bass Guitar)
- Sagar (Drums)
- Diapayan (Drums)

== See also ==
- Bangla Rock
- Princeton Club
