= Antaragni =

Indian college cultural festival

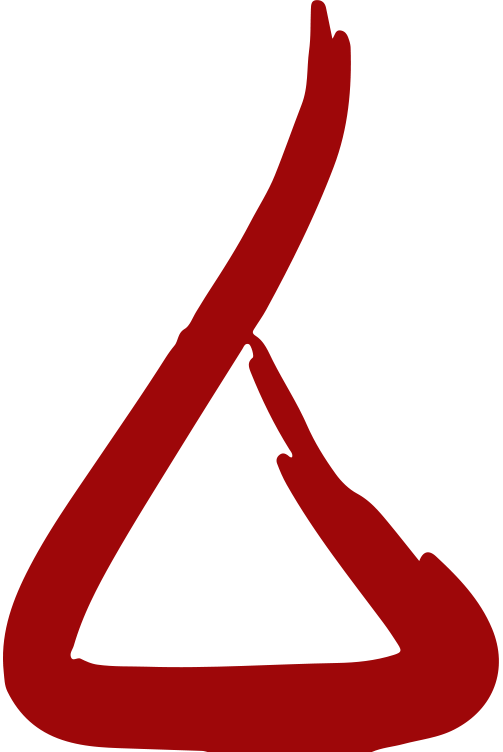
- Antaragni logo
- Status: Active
- Genre: Cultural festival
- Dates: 17 October 2024 – 20 October 2024
- Frequency: Annual
- Venue: Indian Institute of Technology, Kanpur
- Location: Kanpur
- Country: India
- Years active: 1965–present
- Inaugurated: 1965; 61 years ago
- Most recent: 17 October 2024 – 20 October 2024
- Attendance: 130,000+ (2019)
- Patrons: Indian Institute of Technology, Kanpur
- Organiser: Student body, IIT Kanpur
- Website: antaragni.in

Antaragni (English: "the fire within") is an annual cultural festival of the Indian Institute of Technology Kanpur, usually held in October. Established in 1965, the four-day-long festival attracts participants from over 350 colleges in India and has garnered substantial media attention over the years. It features professional shows, competitions, musical performances, DJs, fashion shows, Indian folk dances, and more.

== History ==
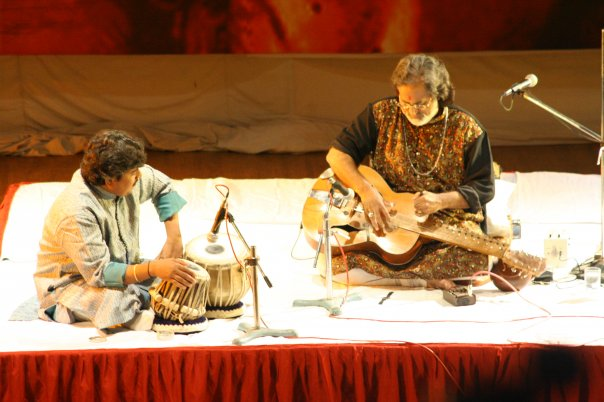
Vishwa Mohan Bhatt performing at Antaragni in 2006

Antaragni began as an inter-collegiate cultural event in 1965. The name of the festival was changed from Culfest to Antaragni in 1993, 27 years after its inception. The festival is entirely organised by students of IIT Kanpur, with the Antaragni chairperson being the only faculty member on the team. Over 350 Indian colleges have participated in the event.

=== Performances ===
- 2006 – Vishwa Mohan Bhatt, Astad Deboo.
- 2016 – Mike Candys, Sartek, Demonic Resurrection, Adnan Sami.

== Notable events ==
- India Inspired – political forum that involves politicians, leaders, and media personalities and where socially relevant issues are discussed, with an emphasis on youth culture. In past years, it has witnessed participation from the student community. Speakers at this event have included Telugu film director Sekhar Kammula, CBSE chairman Vineet Joshi, and actress, singer, and social activist Vasundhara Das.
- Kavi Sammelan – poetry competition. It has included appearances by painter, professor, poet, and film lyricist Rahat Indori and poet Kirti Kale.
- Filmmaking contests – judges have included Abbas Tyrewala and Luv Ranjan.
- Hindi literary events – judges have included Hindi authors Nasira Sharma, Leeladhar Jagudi, and Ravindra Prabhat.
