= Unmaad =

Cultural festival in Bangalore, India

- Genre: Cultural Festival
- Dates: 5 – 7 March 2021
- Frequency: Annually
- Location: Bangalore, India
- Attendance: 35,000+ footfall, 400+ colleges
- Patron: Indian Institute of Management, Bangalore
- Website: www.unmaad.com

Unmaad (pronounced as Unmād) is the annual cultural festival presented by Indian Institute of Management Bangalore. Conducted over a period of three days, Unmaad includes events like dramatics, music performances, dances, quizzes, debates, street plays, professional concerts and fashion show. The event has hosted performances by artists such as Amit Trivedi, Sunidhi Chauhan, Farhan Akhtar, Raghu Dixit, Shankar–Ehsaan–Loy, Zakir Khan, KK, Kailash Kher, Lucky Ali, Strings, Jethro Tull and Indian Ocean.

== Etymology ==
Unmaad derived from Devanagari उन्माद (pronounced as Unmād) stands for lunacy, hysteria, frenzy, mania, insanity or craze.

== History ==
The first edition of Unmaad Festival was held in 1999.

=== Unmaad '04 ===
Unmaad 2004 was held between 30 January – 1 February 2004 with the theme "Free your senses". The festival was preceded by series of online games - Tale Spin, Pied Piper, Bit-n-Bytes, Whats The Goddamn Word and Pre'Cursor'. The main festival saw performances by bands Euphoria and Parikrama.

=== Unmaad '05 ===
2005 edition of Unmaad was held between 27 and 30 January 2005 with the highlight concert by Jagjit Singh.

=== Unmaad '06 ===
Unmaad 2006 was held during 3 to 5 February 2006 with the theme "Experience the madness of life". The festival saw participation from over 150 colleges across India. The highlight of the festival was the performance by Jethro Tull and Jai - Sivamani.

=== Unmaad '07 ===
Unmaad 2007 was held during 2 to 4 February 2007 with the theme "Lose Control". Headlining performances were given by Lucky Ali, Kailash Kher, Indian Ocean and Junoon. International stunt football team from Saudi Arabia conducted workshop on their form of the sport, while leading DJs from India - DJ Leon and Jasmeet from Athena's, Jeffrey's conducted a walkthrough on the basics of DJing for the participants of the festival. The fest also had flagship fashion show event and Mr.and Ms. Unmaad, a personality contest, both of which were judged by former Miss India and Miss Earth Air 2006 - Amruta Patki.

=== Unmaad '08 ===
2008 edition of Unmaad festival was held on 1, 2 and 3 February 2008. The theme was "The Tenth Emotion".

=== Unmaad '09 ===
Unmaad 2009 was held between 2 and 4 October with the theme "The World is Bangalore" chosen to identify the proceedings. The festival had a series of workshops specializing pottery and martial arts. A dance workshop conducted by instructors from the Shiamak Davar institute of performing arts garnered huge response. The B-School of Rock competition judged by Lounge Piranha was won by Public Issue. Pro-nite, a live performance by the trio Shankar, Ehsaan and Loy was also enacted. Four thousand people attended a concert by Wake Up Sid and Rock On!.

=== Unmaad '11 ===
Unmaad '11 - Therefore I am was a celebration of the power of the individual. Unmaad '11 included performances from Indian Ocean, the popular Indian fusion band, and Thermal and a Quarter, a Bangalore-based rock band. Unmaad hosted 'India Inspired', a conclave with Rajat Sharma (the head of India TV), Nisha Susan (the initiator of the Pink Chaddi movement), Viren Wilfred Rasquinha (a former national hockey player) and Bruce Lee Mani (lead of Thermal and a Quarter). Events included Mr. and Ms. Unmaad, fashion show, B-School of Rock (Rock band competition), literary and quizzing events, solo and regional dance competitions, dramatics, light music and western music band performances, rock competitions, song spoofs, collage making, face painting, clay sculpting, comics, design and tattooing contests. In addition to competitions and shows, several workshops Corning mock tail mixing, photography, movie making, dances and pottery were organized.

=== Unmaad '12 ===
Unmaad 2012 was organized between 26 and 28 January 2012. Theme for this particular year was "Escape Yourself" :celebrating real-life heroes who stood up against all odds and made their voices heard. The festival witnessed a performance by musician Benny Prasad and a workshop by music director Shantanu Moitra of Parineeta and 3 Idiots fame. The festival also played host to notable personalities from various fields including Shibani Kashyap, Nicolas Parsons (BBC television presenter) and Fastest Feet in Rhythm from California, including Kathak maestro Pandit Chitresh Das. The star attraction of the festival was a live concert by singer Kailash Kher on 28 January.

=== Unmaad '13 ===
Unmaad 2013 had its very own Sunburn concert with Ma Faiza and DJ Shaan performing live. KK also had a live concert.

=== Unmaad '14 ===
Unmaad 2014 was held between 31 January - 2 February 2014. The theme of the fest this year was "Dil se Desi". More than 200 colleges participated in the fest. The main features of the fest were Farhan Live, Miss India regional rounds and shows by International artists like Murray Molley and Almost Trio.

=== Unmaad '15 ===
Unmaad 2015 was held between 30 January – 1 February 2015 with the theme "A Comic Relief".

=== Unmaad '16 ===
Unmaad 2016 was held between 29 January – 31 February 2016 with the theme "A Breath of Life". Sunidhi Chauhan and Raghu Dixit performed on Pronite. IIM Bangalore hosted Femina Miss India Campus Princess Bangalore round. CSR campaign was also organized as part of the fest.

=== Unmaad '17 ===
Unmaad 2017 was held on 27–29 January 2017. Pronite performance was opened by AIB fame, Zakir Khan, followed by an electrifying performance by Amit Trivedi on 29 January. The theme of the fest was 'The Island of Dreams'. For the first time ever, Unmaad also hosted the World Cultural Fiesta, which was graced by 4 international artists.

=== Unmaad '18 ===
Unmaad 2018 was held from 2–4 February 2018. The theme for Unmaad was 'A Wanderer's Paradise', which gave visitors the experience of traveling through interactive installations. The star attractions of Unmaad 2018 were the Pronite performances by Farhan Akhtar and Indian Ocean band, and Comedy Night with Varun Thakur. The World Cultural Fiesta, as part of Unmaad '18, also hosted 6 international artists this year.

=== Unmaad '19 ===
Unmaad 2019 was held from 1–3 February 2019. The theme for Unmaad '19 was 'The Hues of Hysteria' which revolved around the idea of interplay of colours, a chaos of sensations and a reimagination of dreams. Unmaad 2019 reached the pinnacle of entertainment with Pronite performances by the popular musician duo Salim-Sulaiman, the super sauve Benny Dayal with his Alt Rock/Electro-Funk band- Funkuation, and Comedy Night with the popular stand-up comedian, Abish Mathew. The World Cultural Fiesta, as part of Unmaad '19, was adorned by 5 International artists this year.

=== Unmaad '20 ===
Unmaad 2020 was held from 31 January – 2 February 2020. The theme for Unmaad '20 was 'The box office edition' which highlighted the dramas and the colourful life of Bollywood through the fest. Unmaad 2020 was marked by some wonderful performances like fire act, a puppet show from the known international performers, called world cultural fiesta. The highlight of the three days fest was pronite performances by Amit Trivedi and group, opened by Comicstaan season 1 winner Nishant Suri. The fest also saw Euphoria perform at IIMB after 16 long years and a trippy DJ night by Dualist Inquiry and Indi Graffiti
