= St. Xavier's School, Ranchi =

Private school in Doranda, Ranchi, Jharkhand, India

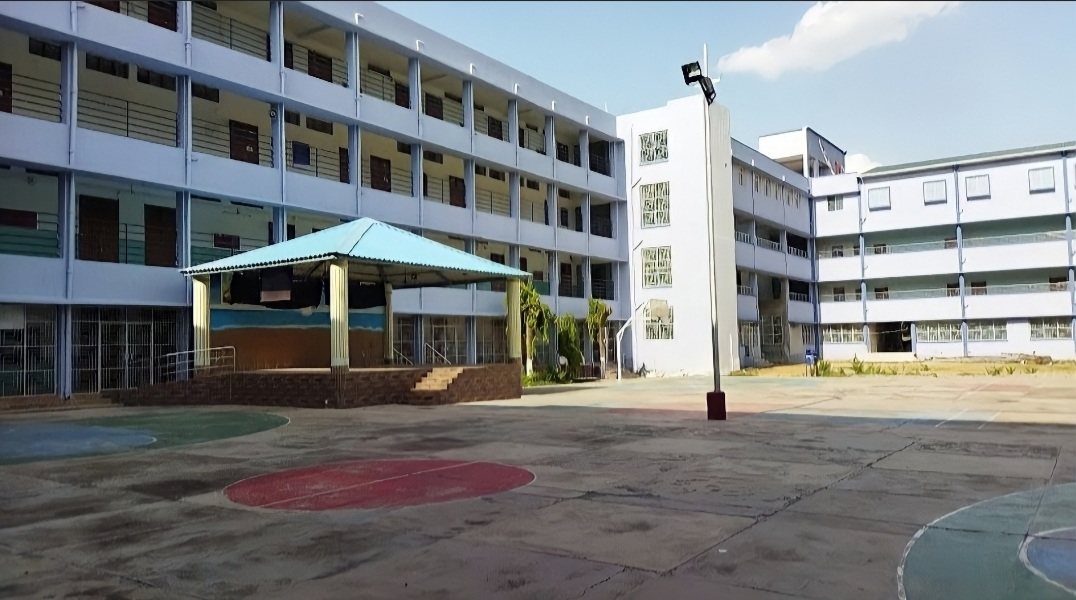
- Senior wing of the school

Location
- Near St. Mary's (N) School Doranda, Ranchi; Ranchi, Jharkhand; India; 23°20′17″N 85°18′52″E

Information
- Type: Private Primary, Secondary and Senior Secondary
- Motto: Strive to excel by all (Hindi)
- Religious affiliation: Catholicism
- Denomination: Jesuits
- Patron saint: Francis Xavier
- Established: 1960; 66 years ago
- Oversight: CISCE
- Principal: Fuldeo Soreng
- Gender: Boys only: KG to 10; Co-educational: 11 to 12
- Enrollment: 3800+
- Classes: K-12
- Accreditation: Council for the Indian School Certificate Examinations
- Alumni: Doranda Old Xaverians (DOX)
- Website: www.stxaviersschool.com

St. Xavier's School is a private Catholic Primary, Secondary and Senior Secondary school located in Doranda, Ranchi, Jharkhand, India. The school was founded by the Jesuits in 1960. It is affiliated to the Council for the Indian School Certificate Examination, New Delhi. The school is boys-only until standard 10 with its Plus Two Section being co-educational.

== Overview ==
Until about 1976, the school followed the Cambridge Higher Secondary curriculum and now follows the Indian Certificate of Secondary Education (ICSE) curriculum. The school feeds students into the engineering colleges (IITs and BIT, NITs, KIIT, etc.) and medical colleges of India.

'उत्साहः सिधये' is the motto of the school, coined in Sanskrit by Late. Ram Balak Singh Bhumihar. It translates to 'Strive to Excel by All'. It is considered a contribution towards the building up of one country and one nation.

== History ==
This school was started in 1960 in response to a request from the professional community of Heavy Engineering Corporation, Hindustan Steel Ltd., and the National Coal Development Corporation.

The school was formally established in 1960 with an initial enrollment of around 350 students and a faculty of 12 teachers.

== Alumni ==
Students and alumni of the school are referred to as Xaverians or Doranda Old Xaverians (DOX).

St Xavier's Doranda is a part of the Jesuit Alumni Association of India. DOX was awarded the Best Alumni Association in 3 different categories at the JAAI Congress in 2020.

== See also ==
- List of schools in India
- List of Jesuit schools
