= Srijan =

Socio-cultural fest of Eastern India

- Genre: Cultural Festival
- Dates: 8–10 March 2019
- Frequency: Annually
- Venue: Pronite Grounds, IIT(ISM)
- Locations: Dhanbad, India
- Country: India
- Years active: 16
- Founded: 2004
- Next event: 6–8 February 2026
- Attendance: More than 30K
- Capacity: Over 20K
- Patron: Indian Institute of Technology (Indian School of Mines), Dhanbad
- Organizer: Student Run
- Website: www.srijaniitism.org (compromised site with harmful content)

Srijan (Hindi: सृजन, romanized: Sr̥jan, lit. 'creation') is the biggest socio-cultural fest of Eastern India organised by Indian Institute of Technology (Indian School of Mines) Dhanbad. Every year, this three-day event attracts more than 30,000 students from more than 200 institutions across the country. It offers young talents a grand stage where they can connect, develop, and bring out their skills, personality, and creativity.

== History ==
=== Srijan 2018 ===
It included a star night performance by Meet Bros and Khushboo Grewal. Zephyrtone performed for EDM and DJ Tejas for the DJ Night. This year marked huge participation in various event by more than 1200 external students from 35 different colleges. One of the main highlight event was FBB Campus Princess which was judged by Priyanka Kumari, Miss India 2017.

=== Srijan 2017 ===
It included a star night performance by Raftaar. Candice Redding and Ace Axe performed for EDM and Dimlight for the DJ Night. This year also witnesses TVF stars Vipul Goyal, Gopal Dutt and Akanksha Thakur. This year remarked huge participation in various event by more than 1000 external students from 33 different colleges. One of the main highlight event was FBB Campus Princess which was judged by Priyanka Kumari, Miss India 2017.

=== Srijan 2015 ===
Srijan 2015 included a performance from Swedish Death Metal band Mindshift on the first day and performances by Indian celebrity singers Jonita Gandhi and Salim - Sulaiman on the second.

=== Srijan 2014 ===
Srijan 2014 was held during 25–27 February 2014. Srijan "Colours of Innovation" included performances by Isha Sharvani and Daksha Sheth Dance Company. Simon Webbe (Lead vocalist Blue), Jal (band), Juggy D and DJ Harshit Shah performed in Encore (Star Night) and Pro Show. Rannvijay Singh hosted the major part of the fest including Mr. & Mrs. Srijan.

== Events ==
The festival encompasses cultural, technical, management as well as gaming events.

== Next Edition ==
The fest would be organised from 6th Feb 2026 to 8th Feb 2026.
