= Princeton Club, Kolkata =

Club in Kolkata, India

Princeton Club
- Type: Club
- Founder: Merlin Group of companies
- Headquarters: Rabindra Sarobar, Kolkata, India
- Products: Sports, bar, live music
- Services: Snacks, drinks, lunch, dinner
- Owner: Merlin Group of companies
- Parent: Merlin Recreation Private Limited
- Website: princeton.in

Princeton Club, is a club promoted by Merlin Recreation Pvt. Ltd. located in Kolkata.

== Facilities ==
The club is mainly popular for organizing Corporate workshops, Business conferences, Training sessions, Annual General Meetings, Press conferences, Dealers' meets, Product launches, Exhibitions. The club has a bar, swimming pool, conference room, gym etc.

== See also ==
- Tantra
