= Hellprint =

Hellprint Festival
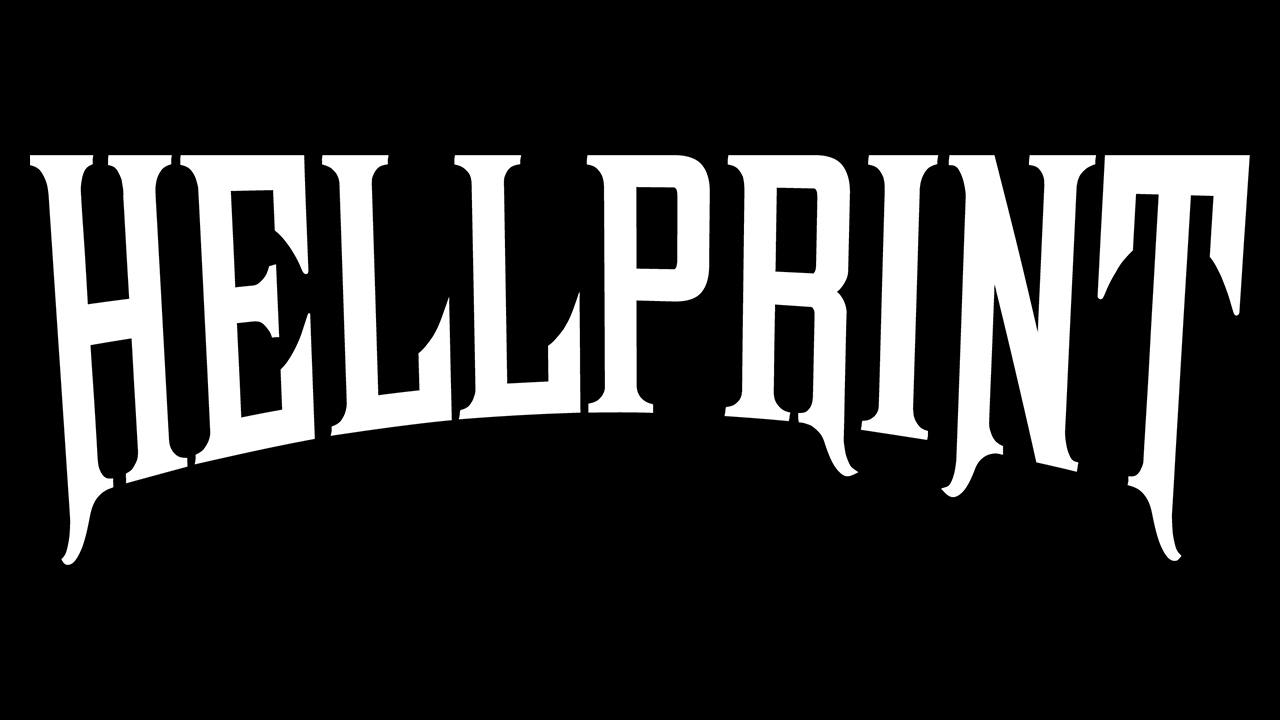
- Genre: Heavy metal
- Dates: September-March
- Location: Bandung Indonesia
- Years active: 2011-present
- Founders: Dany Kajul
- Website: www.hellprintofficial.com

Hellprint is a heavy metal festival held annually at Bandung in Indonesia. The History Of Hellprint began in 2011. In 2016 the event was held with 5 stages and almost 20.000 visitors.
