= Tantra (Kolkata) =

Night Club in Kolkata

- Company type: Nightclub and Pub
- Founder: Surendra Paul
- Headquarters: 17 Park Street, Kolkata, India
- Products: Bar, live music
- Services: Snacks, drinks, lunch, dinner
- Parent: The Park Hotels
- Website: www.theparkhotels.com/kolkata/kolkata/tantra1524.html/

Tantra is one of the most popular nightclubs of Kolkata, India. This nightclub is a property of The Park, Kolkata. It is located at 17 Park Street. Saturday nights are the night parties and Wednesdays are Hip Hop nights at this nightclub.

== Features ==
The club spreads over two levels and it has a floor space of 5,000 square feet. The nightclub has two bars. Saturday nights are the night parties and Wednesdays are Hip Hop nights at this nightclub. The nightclub hosts live music by the city's best bands and singers, with various kinds of music. DJs perform on special days. Special parties are organized on festivals like Christmas and New Year (English calendar).

As of February 2012, after the Park Street car rape case, the nightclub has tightened their security. They started preserving CCTV footage for more than four days and barred stags.

== See also ==
- Princeton Club
