= Bangalore Open Air =

Indian music festival

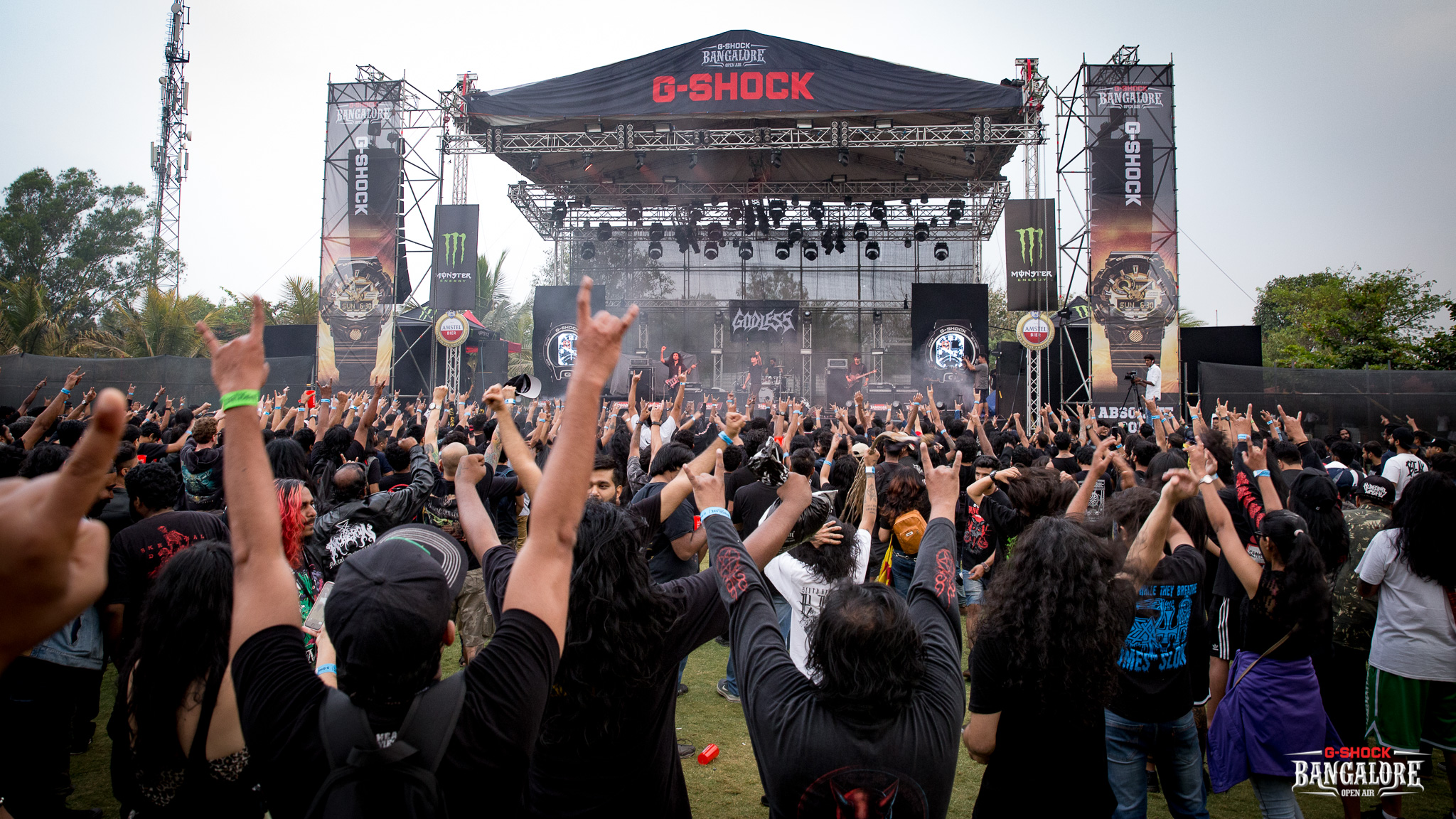
- Bangalore Open Air 2019
- Genre: Heavy metal, rock
- Dates: 1st April 2023
- Location: Bangalore
- Years active: 2012 - Present
- Founders: Infinite Dreams Entertainment
- Attendance: 3720
- Website: www.bangaloreopenair.com

Bangalore Open Air (BOA) is India's only dedicated Heavy metal open air music festival which takes place yearly in Bangalore, India. The 11th edition of the festival in collaboration with Wacken Open Air took place in February 2024.

== Lineups ==
=== 2012 ===
The First Edition of the festival took place on 16 June 2012. It was headlined by German thrash metal band Kreator.

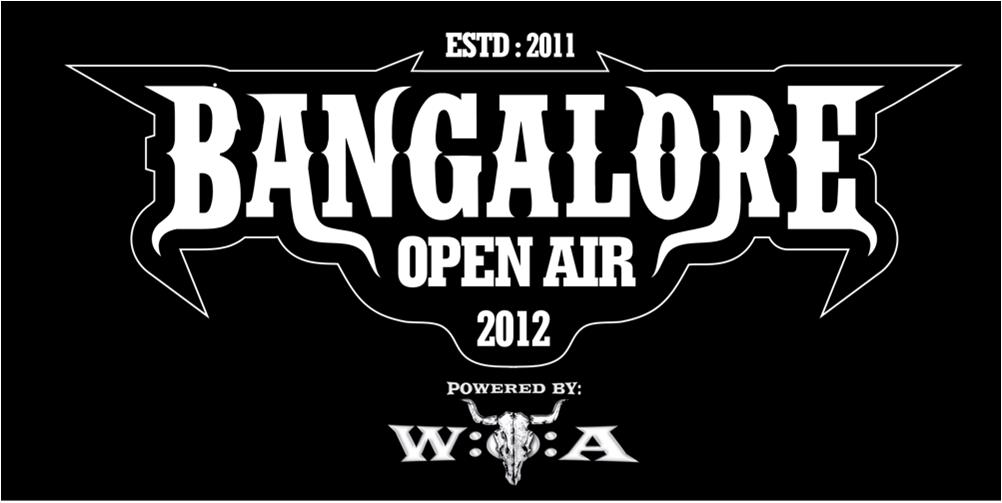
First logo of Bangalore Open Air.

BOA 2012 Lineup
Kreator
Suidakra
Kryptos
Eccentric Pendulum
Bevar Sea
1833 AD
Albatross

=== 2013 ===
The Second Edition of the festival took place at Jayamahal Palace on 6 July 2013 and involved bands and artistes from eclectic genres of Heavy Metal. It was headlined by American metal band Iced Earth and Swedish melodic death metal band Dark Tranquillity.

The event took place at Jayamahal Palace on 6 July 2013.

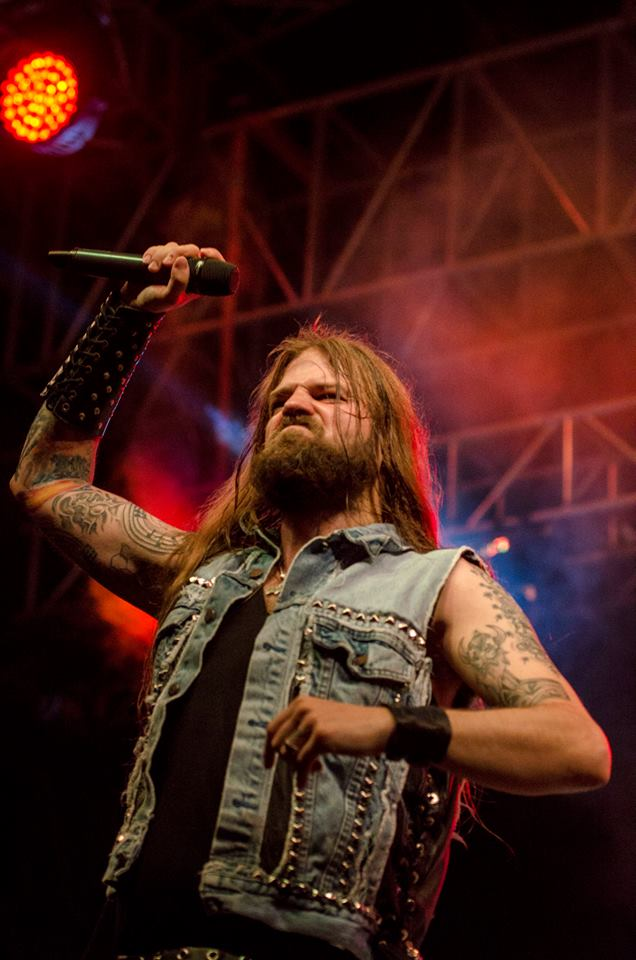
Iced Earth, headlining the 2013 edition of Bangalore Open Air.

BOA 2013 Lineup
Iced Earth
Dark Tranquillity
Ihsahn
Animals As Leaders
Leprous
Demonic Resurrection

=== 2014 ===
The Third Edition of the festival took place on 13 September 2014 and was headlined by Destruction and Rotting Christ. For the first time in the history of Heavy Metal Music the concept of crowd funding was adopted to fund a percentage of the festival.

The 4th Edition of the Wacken Open Air Metal Battle, India presented by Bangalore Open Air was held from 19 April to 27 April. The prelims of the competition were held in Bangalore, Chennai, Hyderabad, Mumbai, Guwahati & Kolkata.

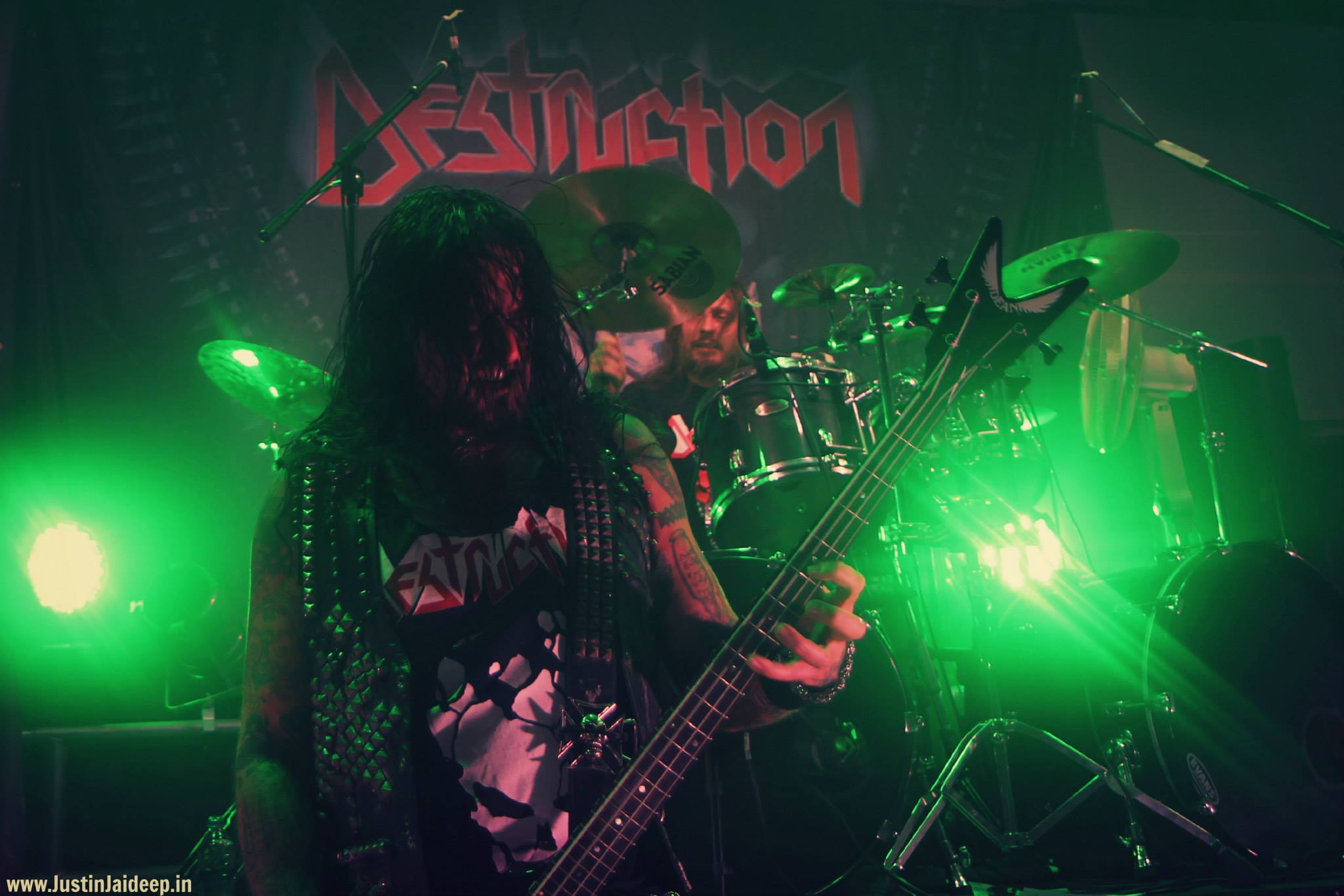
German thrashers, Destruction at the 2014 edition of Bangalore Open Air.

BOA 2014 Lineup
Destruction
Rotting Christ
Kryptos
The Down Troddence
Girish and The Chronicles
Armament
Threinody

=== 2015 ===
The 4th Edition of the festival now renamed G-Shock Bangalore Open Air was held on 6 June 2015.

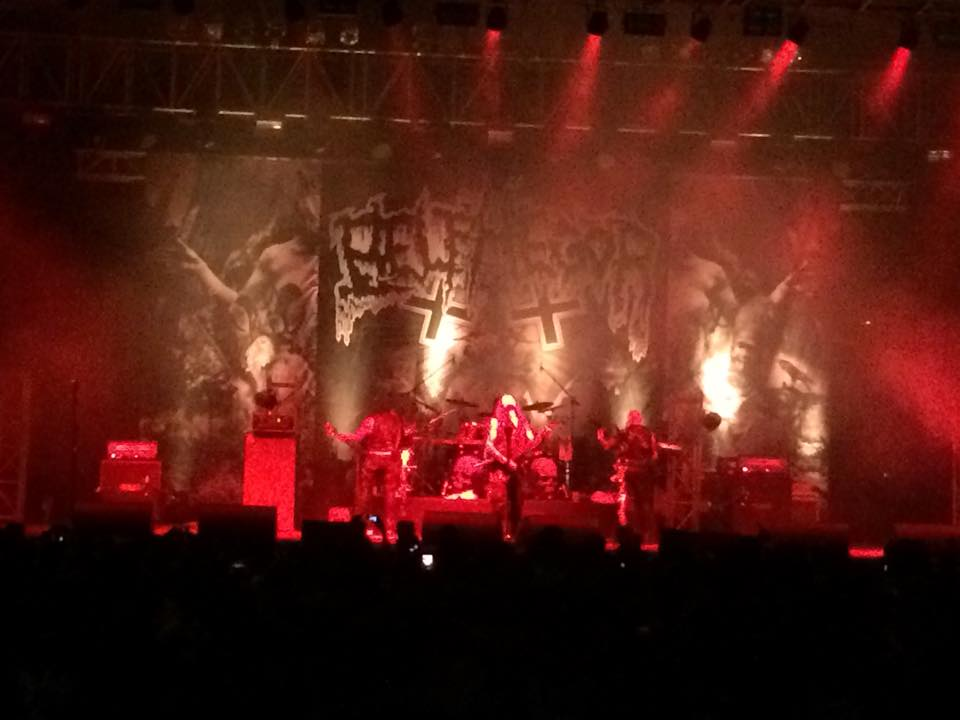
Belphegor from Austria at the 2015 edition of G Shock Bangalore Open Air.

BOA 2015 Lineup
Napalm Death
Inquisition
Belphegor
Orator
Undying Inc.
Gutslit
Escher's Knot
Nauseate

=== 2016 ===
The 5th Edition of the festival was held on 9 July 2016 at Royal Orchid Resorts, Yelahanka, Bangalore.

BOA 2016 Lineup
Vader
Nader Sadek
Skull Fist
Inner Sanctum
Providence

=== 2017 ===
The 6th and most successful edition of G-Shock Bangalore Open Air was held on 1 July 2017 at Royal Orchid Resorts, Yelahanka, Bangalore( the third consecutive time at the same location.) The lineup consisted of bands from the sub genres of: death metal, thrash metal, and speed metal.

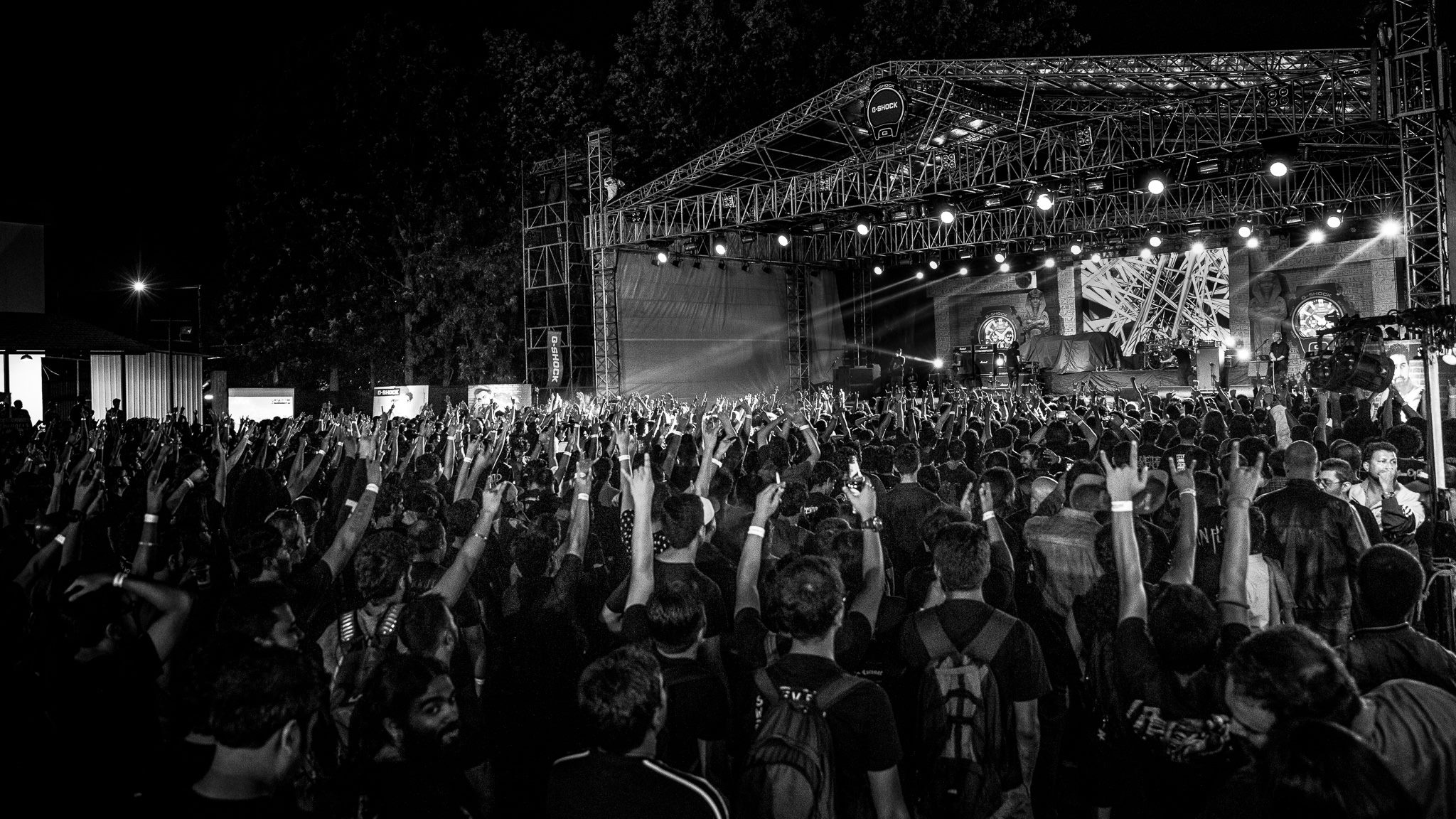
2017 edition of G Shock Bangalore Open Air.

BOA 2017 Lineup
Nile
Coroner
Kryptos
Galaxy Crusher
Speedtrip

=== 2018 ===
The 7th anniversary edition of G-Shock Bangalore Open Air was held on 7 July 2018 at Aadya Farms and Leisure Resorts, Yelahanka, Bangalore. This edition marked the maiden show of American thrash metal titans Overkill in India along with American death metal band Immolation and French post metal band Alcest, who brought their unique blackgaze sound to India after attempting do so since 2013.

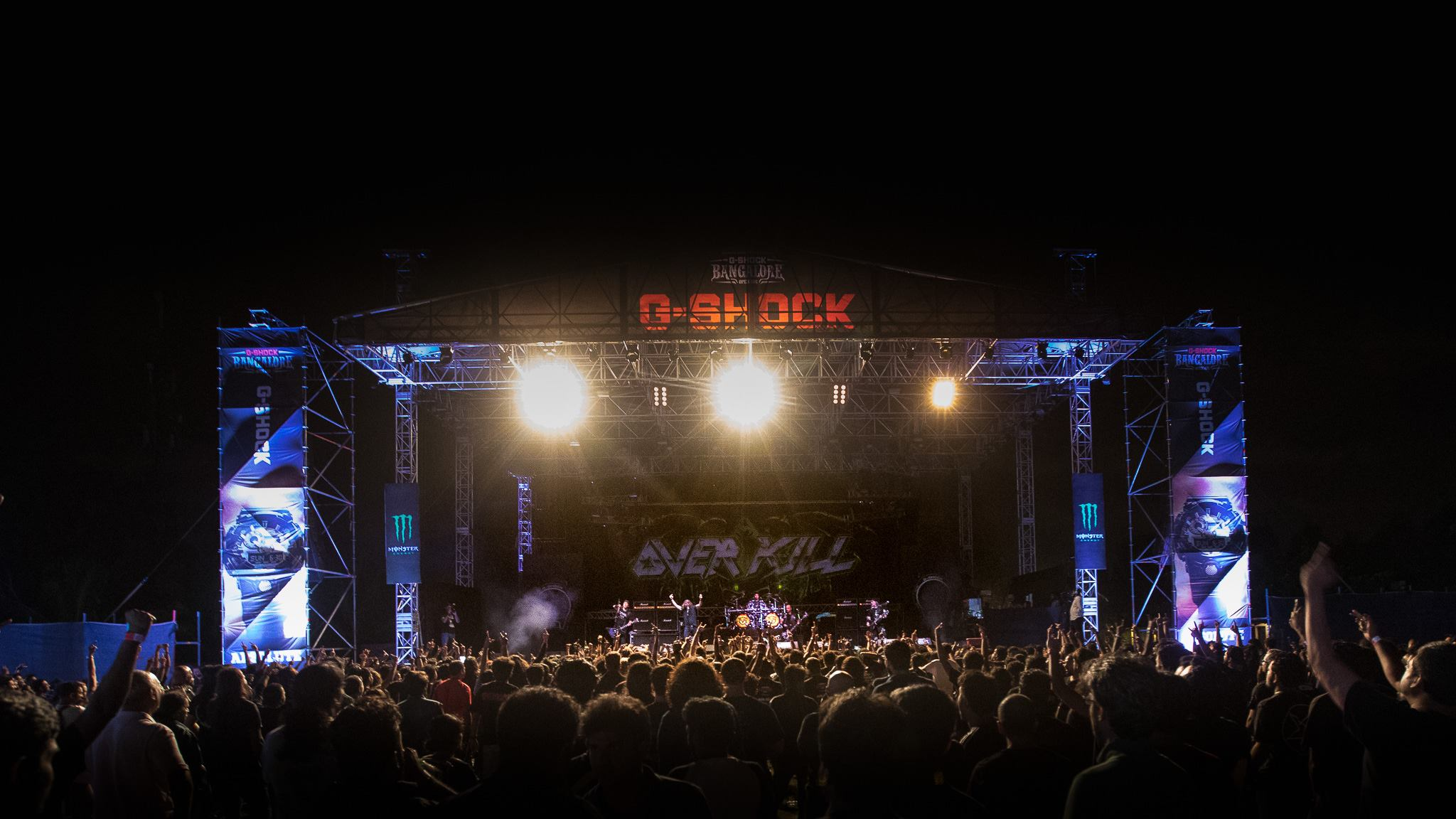
American thrash band Overkill at the 2018 edition of G-Shock Bangalore Open Air.

BOA 2018 Lineup
Overkill
Immolation
Alcest
Kryptos
Nervecell
Eccentric Pendulum

=== 2019 ===
The 8th edition of G-Shock Bangalore Open Air held on 9 February 2019 at Aadya Farms and Leisure Resorts, Yelahanka, Bangalore. Headlining acts include: Black metal giants Abbath and New York Technical death metal outfit Suffocation. On the day of the event the 4 winners of the regional editions of Wacken Metal Battle 2019 from the Indian subcontinent countries: Krur (Nepal), Mass Damnation (Sri Lanka), Trainwreck (Bangladesh), Nephele (India) compete to play for a coveted slot at the Wacken Open Air metal battle in Germany.

BOA 2019 Lineup
Suffocation
Abbath
MassDamnation
Godless
Krur
TrainWreck
Nephele

=== 2020 ===
The 9th edition of Bangalore Open Air was scheduled for 21 March 2020. The organizers announced a new venue: Ramada by Wyndham in Yelahanka, a four star resort in Bangalore.

BOA 2020 Lineup
Marduk
Beyond the Black
Kalmah
Intronaut
The Down Troddence

=== 2023 ===
The 10th edition of Bangalore Open Air was scheduled for 1 April 2023. It was held at Royal Orchid Resort and Convention Centre in Yelahanka, Bangalore.

BOA 2023 Lineup
Amorphia
Godless
Dying Embrace
Kryptos
Pestilence
Born of Osiris
Mayhem
