= Independence Rock Festival =

Annual music festival in Mumbai, India

- Genre: Rock, metal
- Dates: Mid-August
- Locations: Mumbai, India
- Years active: 1986–present
- Website: independencerock.in

Independence Rock Festival is a two-day music festival with a focus on rock and metal, held annually in Mumbai, India, since 1986.
