= NH7 Weekender =

Annual Indian music festival

- Genre: Rock, pop, indie, hip hop, electronic dance music, stand-up comedy
- Dates: October— December
- Locations: Pune (originally, and other cities)
- Years active: 2010 – Present
- Founders: Vijay Nair, Stephen Budd, and Martin Elbourne
- Organizer: NODWIN Gaming
- Website: nh7.in

NH7 Weekender is an annual, multi-city and multi-genre, music and comedy festival held in India, organised by NODWIN Gaming. It began in Pune, Maharashtra in India, as a three-day, multi-genre, music festival in 2010. Since 2012 it has expanded to multiple cities. In 2017, the lineup began to include comedy acts. The festival co-presenting sponsor is The McDowell's House of Soda.

The festival is held between October and December, and hosted in multiple cities alongside its flagship event in Pune. Delhi NCR, Bengaluru, Kolkata, Hyderabad, and Shillong have hosted the festival. The lineup has a mix of established and newer, sub-continental and global artists.

== History ==
In 2006, Vijay Nair, the co-founder and ex-CEO of OML (Only Much Louder), began formulating the idea of an Indian multi-genre music festival modeled after the Glastonbury Festival in Britain where he had taken Pentagram in 2005. In 2009 he met UK music manager Stephen Budd in Mumbai and they discussed the idea of creating an independent music festival. Nair came to London where Budd introduced him to Glastonbury booker Martin Elbourne and the three along with co-founder Girish ‘Bobby’ talwar soon planned and financed the first NH7 Weekender.

The debut festival was held in Pune, in 2010, and was produced by OML. It was a three-day festival, had a multi-stage setup, and was multi-genre. It was headlined by international artists Asian Dub Foundation, The Magic Numbers, and Reverend and The Makers, along with well established Indian acts including Lounge Piranha, Junkyard Groove, Zero, and Demonic Resurrection.

In 2012 the festival expanded to two cities and alongside Pune added multi stage and day festivals in Delhi and Bangalore. Since then, the festival has been held in Kolkata, Meghalaya, Hyderabad, and Shillong with smaller, single day, festivals in Mysore, Jaipur, Nagpur and other cities. In 2017, after OML's foray in the comedy business, the festival added a comedy lineup after having previously booked acts like All India Bakchod and Vir Das for musical performances. The festival is one of the first large scale music festivals in the South Asian sub-continent. Its programming is a mix of Indian independent acts, younger sub-continental artists, and multi-genre international headliners. Initially stages were broadly divided by genres rock and metal, electronic, indie, and folk. Each stage had two platforms, main and transition, with alternated performances. Over the past few years, the festival has ditched genre stages and headliners perform on the Bacardi Arena main stage.

Past headliners have included Asian Dub Foundation, Joe Satriani, José González, Mark Ronson, Mogwai, Flying Lotus, The Wailers, A. R. Rahman, Vishal Bhardwaj, Imogen Heap, The Vaccines, Megadeth, Rodrigo y Gabriela, Seun Kuti, DJ Premier, Simian Mobile Disco, Fink, Jon Hopkins, Bombay Bicycle Club, Anoushka Shankar, SBTRKT, Steven Wilson, Chase & Status, Steve Vai, Nightmares On Wax and others. In August 2019, to celebrate its 10th edition in Pune, where the first NH7 Weekender was held, pre-sale tickets were sold at their 2010 debut price—₹750 ($10.45; under 21 season tickets) and ₹1500 ($20.90; regular season tickets.)

== Editions ==
=== 2010 ===
The festival's debut edition was held from 10–12 December at Koregaon Park in Pune. The lineup had seminal Indian acts like Zero, Swarathma, Pentagram and Blackstratblues alongside international acts like Asian Dub Foundation and The Magic Numbers. The festival had four stages and hosted over 35 artists across three days. It was estimated the festival had 10,000 attendees over the course of three days.

==== Lineup ====
Asian Dub Foundation	The Magic Numbers	Indian Ocean	Swarathma	Demonic Resurrection
Shaa'ir + Func	Junkyard Groove	Something Relevant	The Circus	Noiseware
Arjun Vagale	Khiladi	Split	Infernal Wrath	Parikrama
Ashu & The Petri Dish	Lounge Piranha	Susheela Raman	The Raghu Dixit Project	Pentagram
Airport	Molotov Cocktail	MIDIval Punditz	Tough On Tobacco	PINKNOISE
Barefaced Liar	Bhayanak Maut	DJ Ivan	Undying Inc	Projekt S
Bay Beat Collective	Blackstratblues	Faridkot	Zero	Reverend Soundsystem
Scribe	Ankur & The Ghalat Family			

=== 2011 ===
The second edition of NH7 Weekender was held between 18–20 November 2011. It took place at the Laxmi Lawns near Magarpatta City in Pune and grew to five stages. Over 25,000 were estimated in attendance over the three days. Grammy winner Imogen Heap and the British electronic music act Basement Jaxx headlined along with performances from Midival Punditz, The Raghu Dixit Project, and Swarathma.

==== Lineup ====
Imogen Heap	Basement Jaxx	Bobby Friction	Skyharbor	Imphal Talkies	Big Daddy Klein
Alisha Batth	Fire Exit	Pentagram	Soulmate	Indian Ocean	Blackstratblues
Alisha Pais	Goddess Gagged	Reggae Rajahs	Zero	Jatin Puri	Blakc
Ash Roy	Gumnaam	Riz MC	Su-Real	King Creosote	Demonic Resurrection
Ayush Shreshta	Hipnotribe	Scribe	Swarathma	Menwhopause	Dhruv
B.R.E.E.D.	Humble The Poet	Shaa'ir + Func	Taal Inc.	Microphon3	DJ Jayant
Advaita	Illbilly HiTec + Longfingah	Sid Basrur	Tara Priya	MIDIval Punditz	DJ Swaggamuffin
BASSFoundation	Dualist Inquiry	Sky Rabbit	The Circus	Monkey Sound System	Moniker
Bay Beat Collective	Blessed Love Soundsystem	The Raghu Dixit Project	The Pictish Trail	Motherjane	Nigel Rajaratnam
Bhayanak Maut	Papon & The East India Company	The Ska Vengers	Tough On Tobacco	Ankur Tewari & The Ghalat Family	DJ Nihal
NZ Selector	Ox7gen				

=== 2012 ===
In its third year, the festival expanded to Delhi and Bangalore. The combined lineup included 200 artists, 60 festival pre-party gigs, and six stages, took place in Delhi, on 13–14 October, at the Buddh International Circuit in Noida; in Pune from 2–4 November at Amanora Park Town; and in Bangalore, at the Embassy International Riding School, on 15–16 December.Headliners included Karnivool, Seun Kuti and Egypt 80, Buraka Som Sistema, Megadeth, Bombay Bicycle Club, Anoushka Shankar, and Fink.

==== Lineup ====
Fink	Megadeth	Seun Kuti & Egypt 80	Buraka Som Sistema	Testament
Adam & The Fish Eyed Poets	Anoushka Shankar	Foreign Beggars	Bombay Bicycle Club	The Circus
Adi Suhail Tarun	DJ MooSick	menwhopause	Soulmate	The Aston Shuffle
Advaita	DJ Nihal	Michal Menert	Sound Avtar	The Bicycle Days
Agam	EZ Riser	MIDIval Punditz	Split	The Koniac Net
Akala	Driving Lolita	Million Stylez	Spud In The Box	The Lightyears Explode
Akhu	Dualist Inquiry	Mode7	Su-Real	Madu
AlgoRhythm	Dualist Inquiry and Friends	Modern Mafia	Susheela Raman	The Raghu Dixit Project
Anish Sood	Dub Sharma	Moniker	Swaggamuffin	Low Rhyderz
DJ Amul	East Stepper	Mou	Nigel Rajaratnam	The Shakey Rays
Lagori	Eccentric Pendulum	Mr. Williamz	Swarathma	The Staves
Arjun Vagale	EdGeCut	Mungos Hi-Fi	Slow Down Clown	The Supersonics
Ash Roy	Engine Earz Experiment	Music Basti Project	Symbiz Sound	Nischay Parekh
Ashvin Mani Sharma	EZ Riser	Barefaced Liar	Talvin Singh	Them Clones
Avi & The Uprising	3 Sevens	Nucleya	Tarqeeb	Thermal And A Quarter
Bangalore Metal Project	Galeej Gurus	NZ Selector	Swanand and Shantanu	Tough On Tobacco
BASSFoundation Roots	Gandu Circus	Ox7gen	Soom T	Trilok Gurtu
Bauchklang	Gaurav Jagwani	Pangea	Ankur Tewari & The Glalat Family	TripShot Crew
Bay Beat Collective	Gaurav Raina	MC Ri$k	DJ Uri	Under The Influence
Bhayanak Maut	Goddess Gagged	SlumGods	Solstice Coil	Undying Inc
Big Scary	Gowri	Papon & The East India Company	Bombay Metal Project	The Susmit Sen Chronicles
Blackstratblues	Hari & Sukhmani	Paradigm Shift	BREED	The Manganiyar Seduction
Blackstratblues	Heems	Parikrama	DJ Dale	Vachan
BLANK	Herbalize-It	Parvati & Mawkin	Caesars Of The Green	Vasuda Sharma
Blek	Hexstatic	Pentagram	PINKNOISE	Vedant Bharadwaj
BLOT!	Idan Raichel	Your Chin	Prateek Kuhad	Vernon Noronha
Skrat	iLLBiLLY HiTEC	Periphery	Reggae Rajahs	ViceVersa
Bobby Friction	Imli Imchen	Peter Cat Recording Co.	Rob Da Bank	Vir Das's Alien Chutney
Bombay Bassment	Indian Ocean	Indus Creed	Rudy Roots	Wazulu Da Ill Dravidian
Carlton and the Saints	Jstar	Inner Sanctum	SAGA	Dhruv Visvanath
Cee	Kailasa	Jahcoozi	Sandunes	Delhi Metal Project
Clinton Cerejo	Kaiserdisco	Jinja Safari	Scribe	Delhi Sultanate
Clown With A Frown	Karnivool	Jitter	Shafqat Amanat Ali	Martina-Topley Bird
Dakta Dub	Demonic Resurrection	Karsh Kale	Sheppard	Shaa'ir + Func
Kryptos	Zero	Kohra	Shrilektric	Ziggi Recado
Delhi Sultanate & Begum X	Sky Rabbit	Longfingah		

=== 2013 ===
The festival travelled to four cities; Kolkata (14-15 Dec), Pune (28-29 Oct), Bangalore (23-24 Nov) and Delhi NCR (30 Nov – 1 Dec). Headliners included Chase and Status, Textures, Simian Mobile Disco, and MUTEMATH.

==== Lineup ====
Chase & Status	MUTEMATH	Textures	Skindred	Simian Mobile Disco
Sagar Dharkar	Parthan	Nikhil Mhatre	Shantanu Pandit	The Heatwave
And So I Watch You from Afar	EZ Riser	Moniker	Shiva Soundsystem	The Koniac Net
Ankur Tewari	Faridkot	MoonDogs	SICKFLIP	The Lightyears Explode
Arjun Vagale	Frame/Frame	Mr. Doss	Siddharth Basrur	The Maganiyar Seduction
Baba Jas	Func	Dualist Inquiry	The Grind	The Mavyns
Big City Harmonics	FuzzCulture	Nischay Parekh	Simple Sample	The Monkey In Me
Black Letters	Ganesh Talkies	Noisia	Shankar Tucker	The Raghu Dixit Project
Blackstratblues	Girish Pradhan	Noori	Skrat	The Ska Vengers
BLOT vs. Kohra	Hey Geronimo	Nucleya	Sky Rabbit	The Spindoctor
Bobby Friction	Humble The Poet	OX7GEN	Slow Club	The Supersonics
Bolepur Bluez	Ifs and Buts	Papon and The East India Company	Smoke Signal	The Vinyl Records
Bombay Bassment	Indian Ocean	Paralights	Soulmate	The Wanton Bishops
Bone Broke	Inner Sanctum	Parikrama	Sound Avtar	Tough On Tobacco
Carlton & The Saints	J.Viewz	Scribe	The Fender Benders	TripShot Crew
Castles In The Sky	Jay Wud	Parvaaz	Space Behind The Yellow Room	Undying Inc
A Mutual Question	Johnny B	Pentagram	Spoonbill	Until We Last
Clown With A Frown	Kailasa	PINKNOISE	Sulk Station	Vachan
Dakta Dub	Karsh Kale	Pippin	Suman Sridhar And Jiver	Vir Das's Alien Chutney
David Boomah	Kate Miller-Heidke	Poirier	SundogProject	We Were Promised Jetpacks
Deadly Hunta	Kill Paris	Prateek Kuhad	Su-Real	Winit Tikoo
Delhi Sultanate & Begum X	Krunk All-Stars	Rajasthan Roots	Swaggamuffin	Write In Stereo
Demonic Resurrection	Loch Lomond	Reggae Rajahs	Swarathma	Y&S
Devoid	Low Rhyderz	Reji	Tajdar Junaid	Your Chin
Dhruv Visvanath	Lucky Ali	Rob Garza	Tarqeeb	YT
Digital Suicide	Maati Baani	Ruskin	TesseracT	Zero
DJ Sa	Madboy/Mink	Sampology	MIDIval Punditz	Zervas and Pepper
DJ Uri	Mekaal Hasan Band	Sandunes	The Colour Compound	Ziggy The Blunt
Donn Bhat + Passenger Revelator	Meshuggah	Scribe	The F16s	Dry the River
Shaa'ir + Func	Michal Menert			

=== 2014 ===
The festival travelled to four cities in the span of a month. Starting off with Kolkata (1-2 Nov), Bangalore (8-9 Nov), Pune (21-23 Nov) and Delhi NCR (29-30 Nov). Headliners included The Vaccines, Jon Hopkins, Fear Factory, Luke Sital-Singh, and Amit Trivedi.

==== Lineup ====
Amit Trivedi	Fear Factory	Jon Hopkins	Peking Duk	The Vaccines	MUTEMATH
Adi & Suhail	Coshish	Kaos	Providence	The Bartender	The News
AIB	Curtain Blue	Killwish	Reggae Rajahs	The Delhi Alternative	Nikhil D'Souza
AlgoRhythm	Dualist Inquiry	Klypp	Motopony	The Down Troddence	The Ska Vengers
Alo Wala	DJ Sa	Luke Sital-Singh	Cloud Control	The Emerald Armada	The Supersonics
A Mutual Question	Barmer Boys	Maati Baani	Sandunes	The F16s	Tetseo Sisters
Bhavishyavani Crew	Nucleya	Madboy/Mink	Zygnema	The Ganesh Talkies	The Wooden Shield
Appleonia	Su Real	Money For Rope	Scribe	The Inspector Cluzo	Them Clones
As Animals	Moniker	Monica Dogra	Sean Roldan		Thermal And A Quarter
B.R.E.E.D	Goldspot	Mr. Woodnote & Lil Rhys	Selvaganesh	Skyharbor	Undying Inc
Bhayanak Maut	Fossils	Foreign Beggars	Shaa'ir + Func	Songhoy Blues	Unohu
Big City Harmonics Live	Frame/Frame	Namit Das + Anurag Shanker	Sickflip	Soulmate	Voctronica
Blackstratblues	Fuzzy Logic		Skrat	Soulspace	When Pandas Attack
Blent	Gingerfeet	Hoirong	Sky Rabbit	Spud In The Box	Nanok
Bombay Bassment	Indian Ocean	Houdini Dax	Calcutta Local		Neeraj Arya's Kabir Cafe
Bombay Punk United	Your Chin	Iamrisha	Castles In The Sky	Superfuzz	Nicholson
Peepal Tree	Tejas	Ankur & The Ghalat Family	Chad Valley	Dinosaur Pile-Up	DJ Skip
EZ Riser	Indus Creed	RUN! It's the Kid	Pangea	Ox7gen	Norcotiq
Sachal Jazz Ensemble	DJ MoCity	Colossal Figures	The Manganiyar Classroom	The Raghu Dixit Project	

=== 2015 ===
Another city, Shillong (23-24 Oct), was added to the festival lineup. After Shillong, the festival travelled to Kolkata from 31 Oct – 1 Nov, followed by Delhi on 28-29 Nov, and in Pune and Bangalore from 4-6 Dec. This was the first year when the festival took place in two cities, Pune and Bangalore, on the same dates. Headliners included A. R. Rahman, Mogwai, Megadeth, Mark Ronson, Rodrigo y Gabriela, Flying Lotus, SBTRKT, and The Wailers.

==== Lineup ====
A. R. Rahman	Mark Ronson	SBTRKT	Flying Lotus	The Wailers	Mogwai
Aayushi Karnik	Dhruv Voyage	Rodrigo y Gabriela	Peter Cat Recording Co.	Street Stories	Sukanti & Anushree
Acollective	Diarchy	Madboy/Mink	Pierce Brothers	Swarathma	Tails On Fire
Advaita	Dr. L. Subramaniam	Mahesh Raghunandan	PINKNOISE	Thaikkudam Bridge	Swarantar
Akummika	Dualist Inquiry	Man Goes Human	Prateek Kuhad	The 3Stylers	The Bartender
Alisha Pais	Dualist Inquiry	Dhruv Visvanath	Raghav Sachar	The Clameens	The Colour Compound
Anish Sood	Duncun Rufus	Max Godman	Reggae Rajahs	The F16s	The Ganesh Talkies
Ankur & The Ghalat Family	Erotic Market	Megadeth	Rehan Dalal	The Ska Vengers	The Map Room
Arka	EZ Riser	Mad Orange Fireworks	Ritviz	The Tripp	The Raghu Dixit Project
Awkward Bong	Faridkot	Naezy	Spud In The Box	Thumpers	The Urban EarlyMen
Baba Sehgal	Feyago	Nanok	Sandunes	Underground Authority	Undying Inc
Baiju Dharmajan Syndicate	Perfect Timing	Neel and The Lightbulbs	Sapta	Until We Last	Nusrat Tribute by Vishal Dadlani
Begum	Fossils	Neeraj Arya's Kabir Cafe	Maati Baani	Vir Das' Alien Chutney	Scribe
Bhayanak Maut	Frisky Pints	Nicholson	Selvaganesh	Shaa'ir + Func	Sickflip
Big City Harmonics	Fuzzy Logic	Nikhil D'Souza	Skrat	Siddharth De	Sid Vashi
Bipul Chettri	Gabriel Daniel	Niladri Kumar	Soul Clap	Skylight Vision	Sky Rabbit
Blackstratblues	Gully Gang	Nischay Parekh	Space Is All We Have	Sound Avtar	Soulmate
Blakc	Hidden Orchestra	Noori	Nucleya	Oh, Rocket!	Pangea
Bombay Bassment	Hriday Gattani	Peasant's King	Parvaaz	Parikrama	Papon and The East India Company
Borkung Hrangkhawl	Imphal Talkies	Brodha V	Kailasa	Indus Creed	Peepal Tree
Clinton Cerejo	Chayan & Smiti	Lou Majaw & Friends	Last Remaining Light	Lagori	Cactus
Crazy	Lucid Recess	Curtain Blue			

=== 2016 ===
In 2016, Shillong kicked off the Weekender (21-22 Oct) and saw close to 40,000 people over the weekend. The Weekender traveled to a new city, Hyderabad (5-6 Nov) before culminating in a new venue in Pune, Life Republic in Hinjawadi. The three cities saw a cumulative attendance of over 110,000. Headliners included Steven Wilson, Farhan Akhtar, Shankar Mahadevan, José González, Anoushka Shankar, Patrick Watson, and The Joy Formidable. This year also began the festival's smaller editions in five cities, as day-long festivals, in Kolkata, Puducherry, Mysore, Nagpur and Jaipur.

==== Lineup ====
Steven Wilson	Django Django (DJ Set)	Jose Gonzalez	Farhan Akhtar	DJ Premier	The Joy Formidable
Aberrant	Aewon Wolf	Komorebi	RAC	Shankar Mahadevan	Shri
Alluri	Dossers Urge	Kumail	Rhythm Shaw	The F16s	Spud In The Box
Alobo Naga & Band	Dualist Inquiry	Lucid Recess	River	The Raghu Dixit Project	Tough on Tobacco
Anish Sood	Eagulls	Madboy/Mink	Rosie Lowe	The Ritornellos	Underground Authority
Ankur & The Ghalat Family	Easy Wanderlings	Mali	Sapta	The Ska Vengers	Undying Inc
Anoushka Shankar	Elephant In The Elevator	Mosko	Sempre Libera	The Tapes	Vertical Horizon
Aqua Dominatrix	Prateek Kuhad	Murthovic	Sickflip	Abish + Kenny	Vir Das' Alien Chutney
Arjun Vagale	Fossils	Naezy x Prabh	Sid Vashi	Su Real	What Escapes Me
Arpit Chourey	Func	NAFS	Skrat	Divine	When Chai Met Toast
Aswekeepsearching	Funk Assassin	Nanok	Skyharbor	Nicholson	Wild Palms
Bhayanak Maut	Gigi Lamayne	Natty	Soulmate	Nucleya	Zoya
Bipul Chettri	Goddess Gagged	Parekh & Singh	The Ganesh Talkies	Papon	Dinosaur Pile-Up
Blue Temptation	Gordi	Gumbal	Swarathma	Paraphoniks	Karsh Kale Collective
Borkung Hrangkhawl	Parikrama	Hriday Gattani	Dhruv Voyage	Indian Ocean	Patrick Watson
Dhruv Visvanath	Tejas	Imphal Talkies			

=== 2017 ===
The eighth edition of the festival began with the a return to the state of Meghalaya between 27 and 28 October. The edition saw over 25,000 attendees, before traveling back to its home city, Pune from 8-10 December, which estimated 45,000 in total attendance.

Headliners included Steve Vai, Textures, The Dillinger Escape Plan, CAS, Marky Ramone, Ram Sampath, and Vishal Bhardwaj. The Dillinger Escape Plan and Textures, both were on a farewell tour. Textures played their last ever show in Pune. Since signing comedians to their roster, OML added a comedy lineup and included Biswa Kalyan Rath, Kanan Gill, All India Bakchod members Rohan Joshi, Tanmay Bhat and Ashish Shakya, Kunal Kamra, Azeem Banatwalla and musical-satire trio Aisi Taisi Democracy among others. There were also nine single-day editions including shows in Kolkata, Bangalore, Jaipur, Puducherry, Indore, Kochi, Goa, Hyderabad and Mysore.

==== Music lineup ====
Vishal Bhardwaj	Steve Vai	The Dillinger Escape Plan	Marky Ramone	The Ram Sampath Experience	Textures
Aditi Ramesh	DJ MoCity	Mahesh Raghunandan	Skyharbor	TM Krishna	CAS
Ali Saffudin	Dualist Inquiry	Malfnktion	Divine	The Ganesh Talkies	Dewdrops
Alluri	Easy Wanderlings	Mame Khan	Thaikuddam Bridge	Madame Gandhi	Colt Silvers
Amit Trivedi	Faridkot	Skrat	The Local Train	The Magnets	Pentagram
Andrea Tariang Group	Feyago	May Island	The Raghu Dixit Project	NH7 Hip-Hop Collective	Aarya
Ankur & The Ghalat Family	Girls Names	MojoJojo	Nooran Sisters	The Rudy Wallang Guitar Jamboree	Scribe
Ape Echoes	Goddess Gagged	Mosko	Oceantied	Blue Temptation	Karsh Kale
Aqua Dominatrix	Gurbax	The Ska Vengers	Parvaaz	Bombay Bassment	Youngblood
aswekeepsearching	Honey Lung	Polar Lights	Prabh Deep	Short Round	Lateral
Avora Records	Hriday Gattani	Vir Das' Alien Chutney	When Chai Met Toast	Kamakshi Khanna Collective	Kumail
Bad Pop	Indian Ocean	Zokova	Zygnema	Prateek Kuhad	Sid Vashi
Baiju Dharmajan Syndicate	Indigo Children	Rhythm Shaw	Ritviz	Bhayanak Maut	Lady Midday
Bhrigu Sahni	Blackstratblues	Khasi Bloodz			

==== Comedy lineup ====
Biswa Kalyan Rath	Kanan Gill	Tanmay Bhat	Nishant Tanwar	Sapan Verma
Aisi Taisi Democracy	Kaneez Surka	Rohan Joshi	Neville Shah	Rahul Subramanian
Anirban Dasgupta	Kautuk Srivastava	Sonali Thakker	Azeem Banatwalla	Naveen Richard
Anuvab Pal	Kunal Kamra	Sumaira Shaikh	Urooj Ashfaq	Atul Khatri
Ashish Shakya	Kunal Rao	Sumukhi Suresh	Vaibhav Sethia	Gaurav Kapoor
Aadar Malik				

=== 2018 ===
The ninth edition began in Meghalaya, on 2-3 November. It returned to Pune from 7-9 December. Both editions took place in the same venues: Wenfield, The Festive Hills, Meghalaya and Mahalakshmi Lawns, Nagar Road, Pune. Headliners included Joe Satriani, God Is An Astronaut, The Contortionist, Nightmares on Wax, Switchfoot, Poets of The Fall, Salim-Sulaiman, and Shubha Mudgal. An added comedy lineup was also included. In addition to this, there were also 7 single-day editions for the festival in Kolkata, Jaipur, Kochi, Hyderabad, Mysore, Lucknow and Chandigarh.

==== Music lineup ====
Joe Satriani	God Is An Astronaut	The Contortionist	Nightmares On Wax	Poets Of The Fall	Salim-Sulaiman	Mahesh Kale
Shubha Mudgal	Zubeen Garg	Switchfoot	Guthrie Govan	When Chai Met Toast	Kush Upadhyay	
The Vinyl Records	FKJ	Bhuvan Bam	Ritviz	IMUR	Tanya Nambiar	
The Local Train	Tarqeeb	Dualist Inquiry	Cinema of Excess	The LaFontaines	Ape Echoes	
Sapta	Sandunes	ROE	Gurbax	Smokey	DCF_Shapes	
Lagori	Dewdrops	Shadow & Light	Mohini Dey	Benny Dayal & Funktuation	Scribe	
Alif	Worldservice Project	Blushing Satellite	Abhilash Choudhury	Summersalt	Mali	
Kimochi Youkai	DOE	Aditi Ramesh	Whale in the Pond	Nothing Anonymous	Zero	
Jay Abo	Ladies Compartment	Shankar Mahadevan	House of Waters	The Yellow Bucket	Mahesh Raghunandan	
The Twin Effect	Fame The Band	West Thebarton	Tiny FIngers	Dossers Urge	Avancer	
Pineapple Express	Carl and the Reda Mafia	Louise Burns	sleepmakeswaves	Smalltalk	Mahesh Kale	
Komorebi	Kumail	The Yellow Diary	Burudu	DNKLE	Rain in Sahara	
Hashback Hashish	Corridors	Takar Nabam Trio	Aarifah Rebello	The Pirates	TM Krishna	
Lacuna	Rafiki	Fiddler's Green	Parvaaz	Across Seconds	Paper Queen	
Alok Babu aka All.Ok	Ankur and the Ghalat Family	aswekeepsearching	Pentagram	Tipriti Kharbangar & the Clansmen	Sky Level	
Sanjeeta Bhattacharya	Morning Mourning	adL x k.ly	The Other Soul Collective			

==== Comedy lineup ====
Zakir Khan	Biswa Kalyan Rath	Ashish Shakya	Kunal Rao	Radhika Vaz
Kaneez Surka	Sumaira Shaikh	Sumit Anand	Kavin Jay	Aishwarya Mohanraj
Prashasti Singh	Navin Noronha	Nishant Suri	Saurav Mehta	Kumar Varun
Punya Arora	Niveditha Prakasam	Urooj Ashfaq	Azeem Banatwala	Rahul Dua

=== 2019 ===
The 10th edition was held in Jaintia Hills in Meghalaya (1-2 November), and took place in Pune (29 November – 1 December). In August 2019, to celebrate 10 editions of the music festival in Pune, where the first NH7 Weekender was held, pre-sale tickets were put on sale at the same prices they were sold at in 2010 — ₹750 (under 21 season tickets) and ₹1500 (regular season tickets). Headliners include Opeth, Nick Murphy, Karnivool, Marty Friedman, Kodaline and EarthGang.

==== Music lineup ====
Nick Murphy	Opeth	Kodaline	EarthGang	Marty Friedman	Karnivool	TesseracT
Kokoroko	Cozz	Hariharan	Wadalis	Soulmate	Shubha Mudgal	Across Seconds
Sid Sriram	Sandunes	Garden City Movement	Pengshui	Okedo	Blue Temptation	Antariksh
MIDIval Punditz	Indian Ocean	Swarathma	Raja Kumari	Yung.Raj	Imphal Talkies	Fame The Band
Ritviz	Underside	Gully Gang Showcase	Parvaaz	Rafiki	Meba Ofilia	Lo! Peninsula
BLOT!	Bhayanak Maut	Gutslit	Brotha V	Avora Records	Swadesi	Pakshee
Aarifah Rebello	Azamaan Hoyvoy	adL x k.ly ft Dappest	SickFlip	DCF_Shapes	Shorthand	Sarathy Korwar
Arunaja	Black Letters	Boombay Djembe Folas	Chrms	Gauley Bhai	Solr	Zokhuma
Cut A Vibe	Dee En	Devoid	Ditty	Minute of Decay	Khasi Bloodz	Tejas
DJ Ishani	Easy Wanderlings	Fopchu	Hanumankind	Kokoroko	Saptak Chatterjee	Praveen Achary
Kaam Bhari	Spitfire	JBabe	Job Kurian	Pia Collada	That Boy Roby	Small Axe Sound
Kavya x Chaz	Kumail	Lifafa	MadStarBase	The Koniac Net	The Soul	Water & Rum
Malfnktion ft Shayan	Many Roots Ensemble	Benny Dayal & Funktuation	When Chai Met Toast	Tanya Nambiar	Anand Bhaskar Collective	Nothing Anonymous
Raghav Meattle	Ramya Pothuri	Saltwater	The Andrea Tariang Band	Submarine In Space		

==== Comedy lineup ====
Aadar Malik	Biswa Kalyan Rath	Zakir Khan	Kanan Gill	Varun Thakur
BhaDiPa	Aakash Gupta	Kautuk Srivastav	Bassi	Alexander The Comic
Pavitra Shetty	Neeti Palta	Neetu Bharadwaj	Prashasti Singh	Sejal Bhat
Tape-A-Tale	Prathyush Chaubey	Rueben Kaduskar	Shreeja Chaturvedi	Surbhi Bagga
Urooj Ashfaq	Raunaq Rajani	Sumukhi Suresh	Samay Raina	Shaad Shafi
Rahul Subramanian	Kenny Sebastian	Supriya Joshi	Sumit Saurav	

International Artists at NH7 Weekender

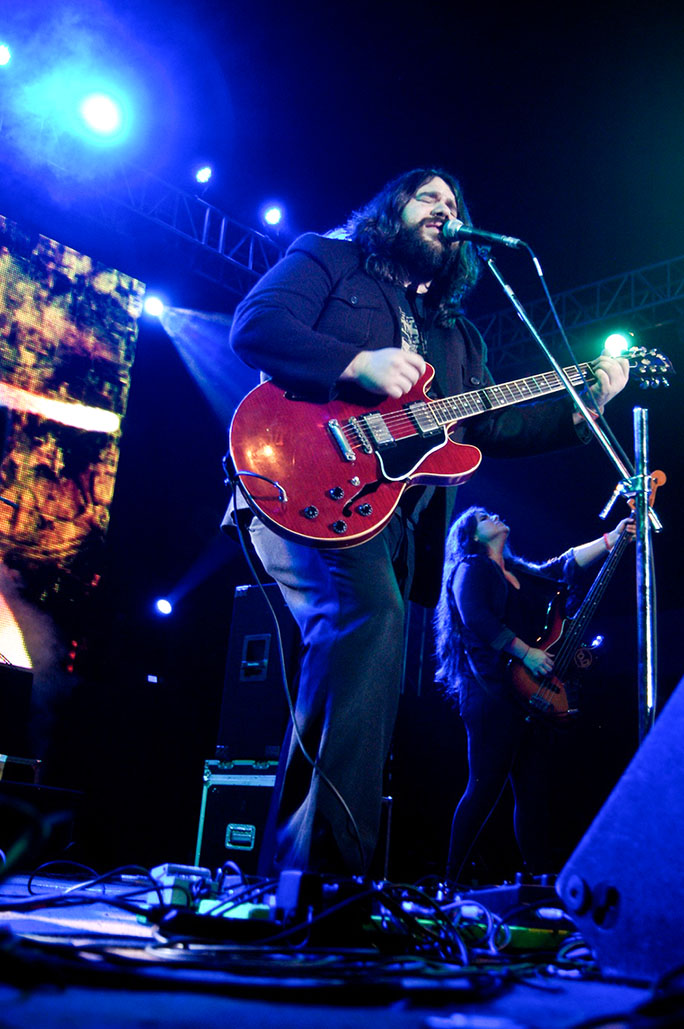
The Magic Numbers (2010)

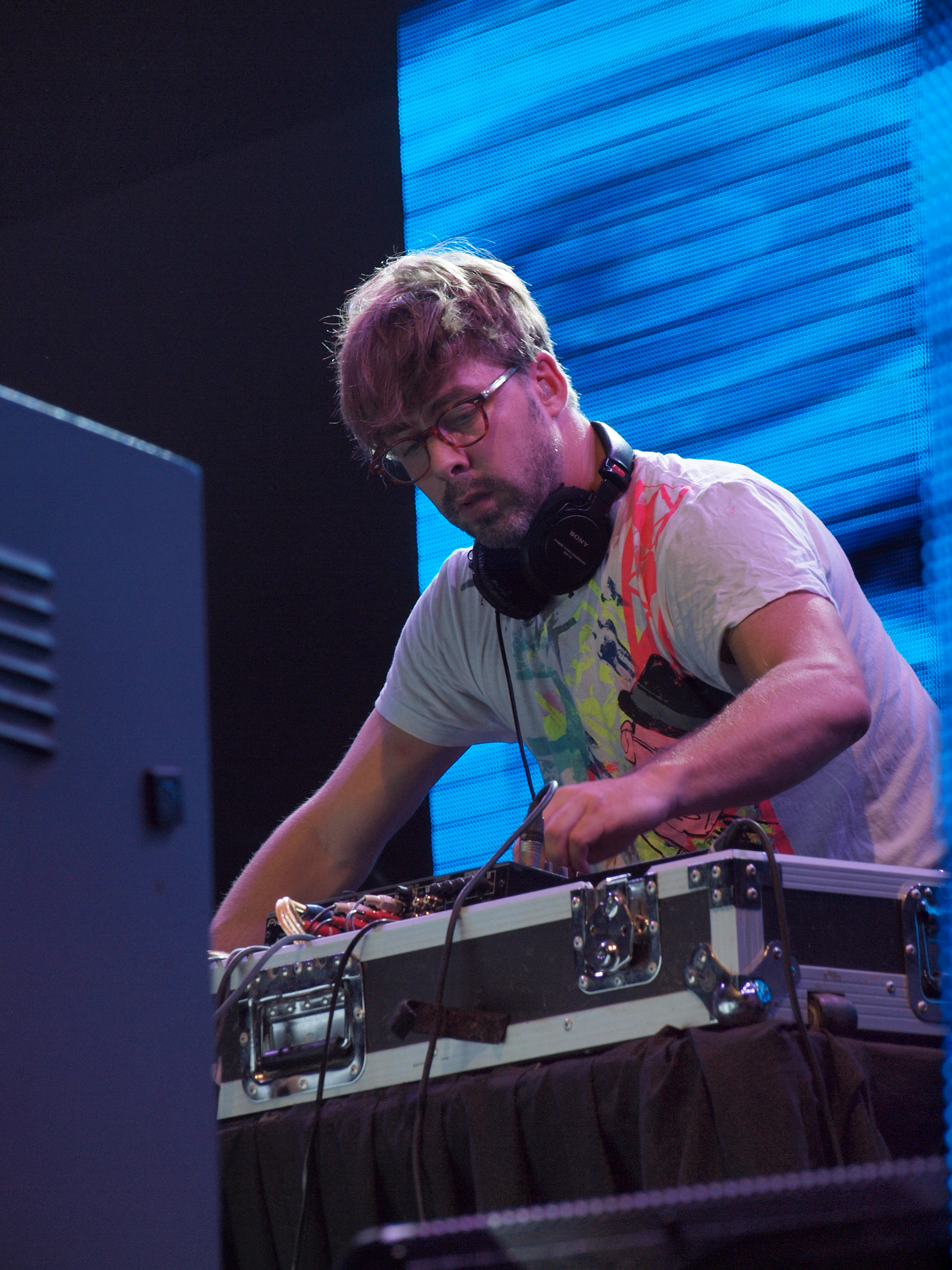
Felix Buxton (2011)

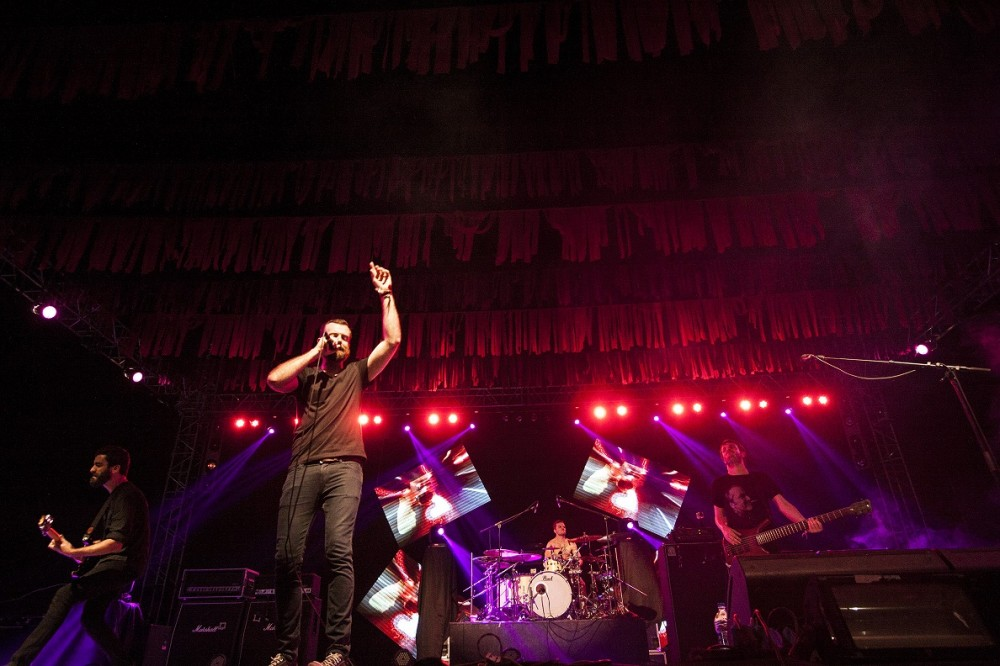
Karnivool (2012)

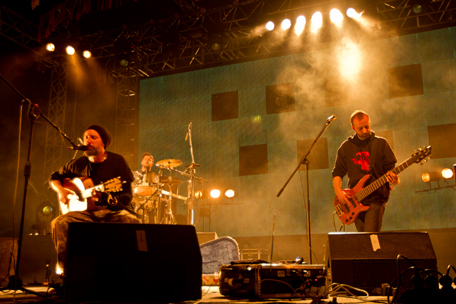
Fink (2012)

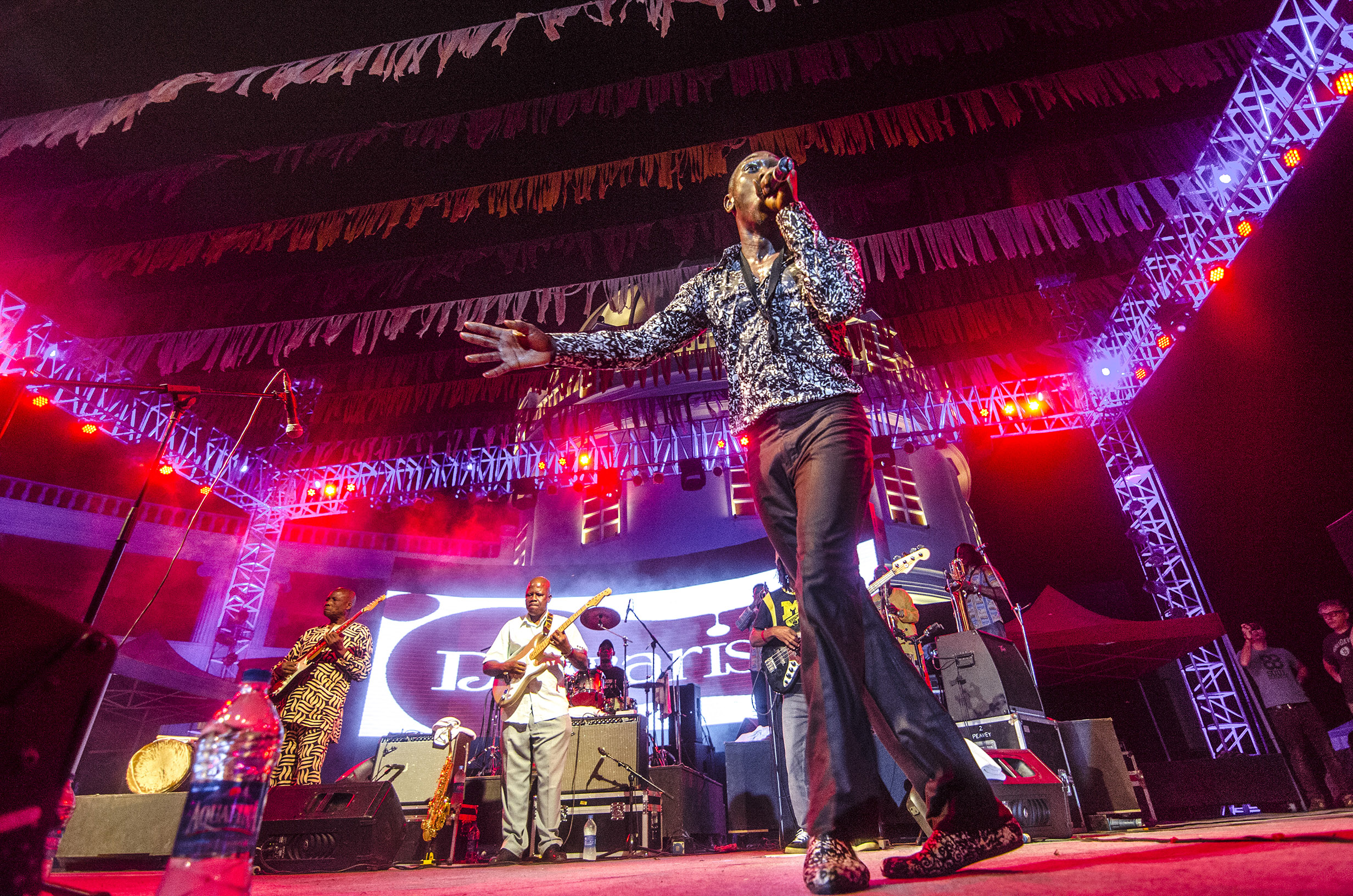
Seun Kuti & Egypt 80

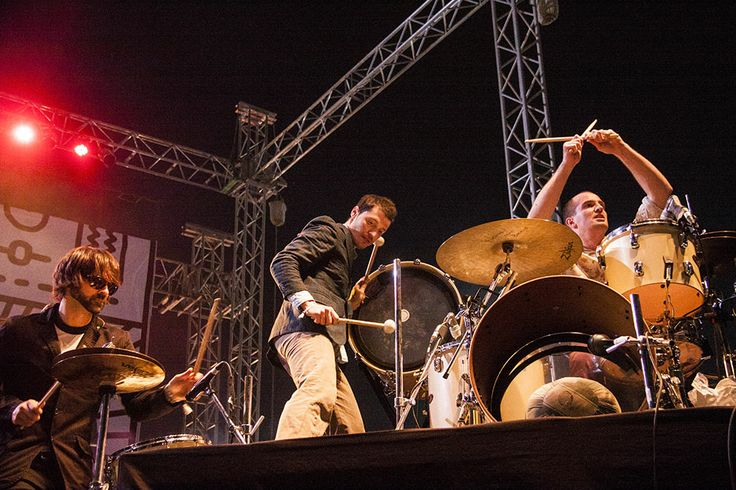
Mutemath

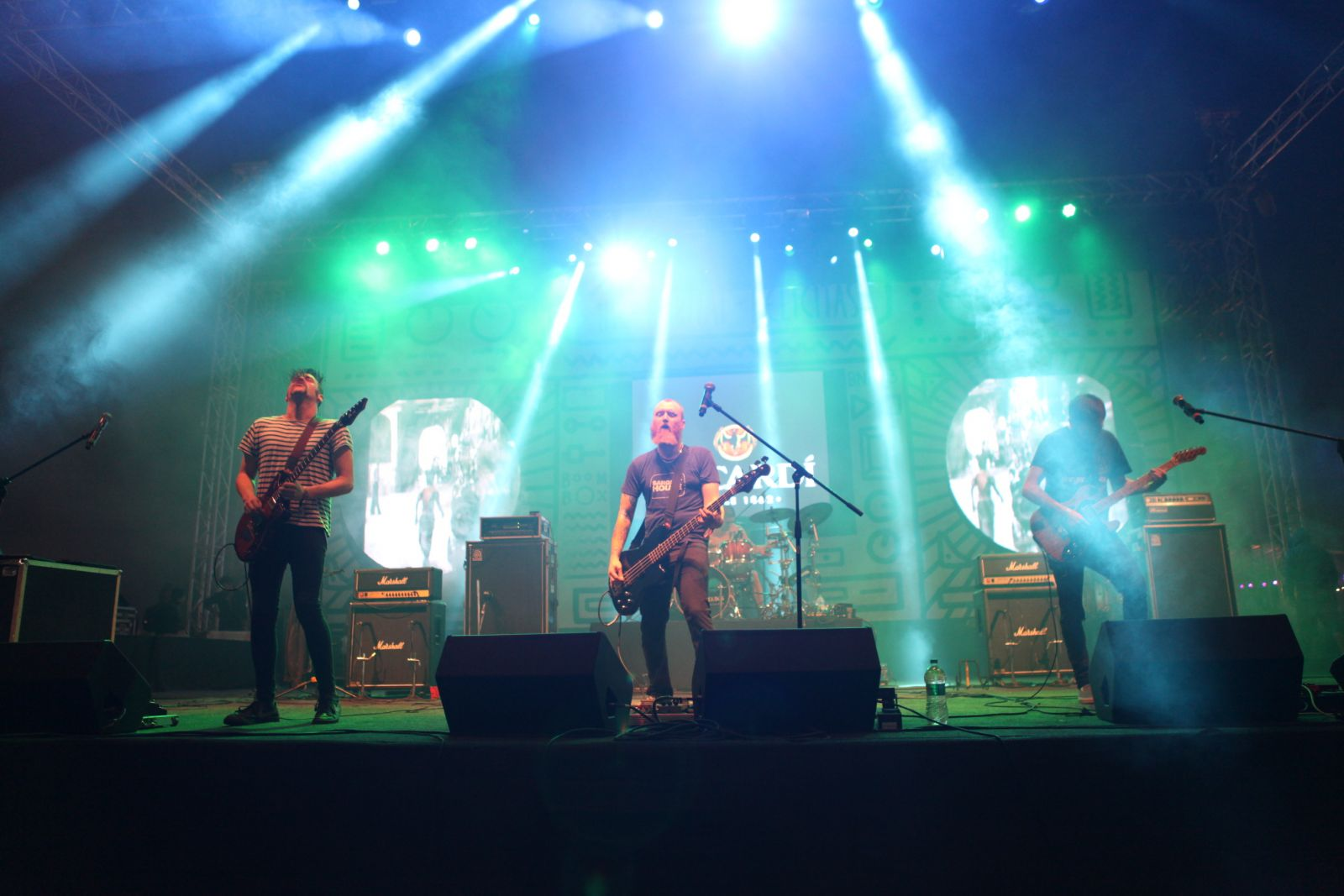
And So I Watch You from Afar

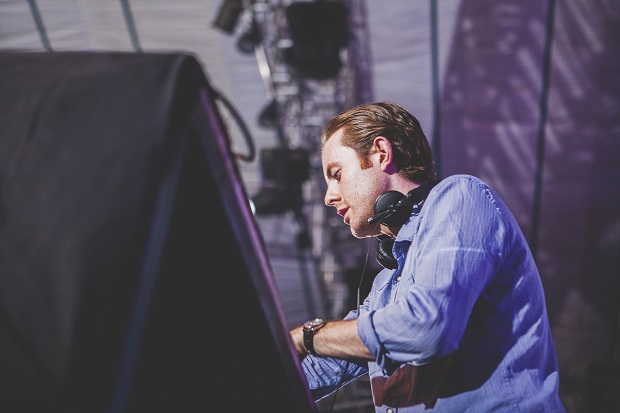
Chase & Status (2013)

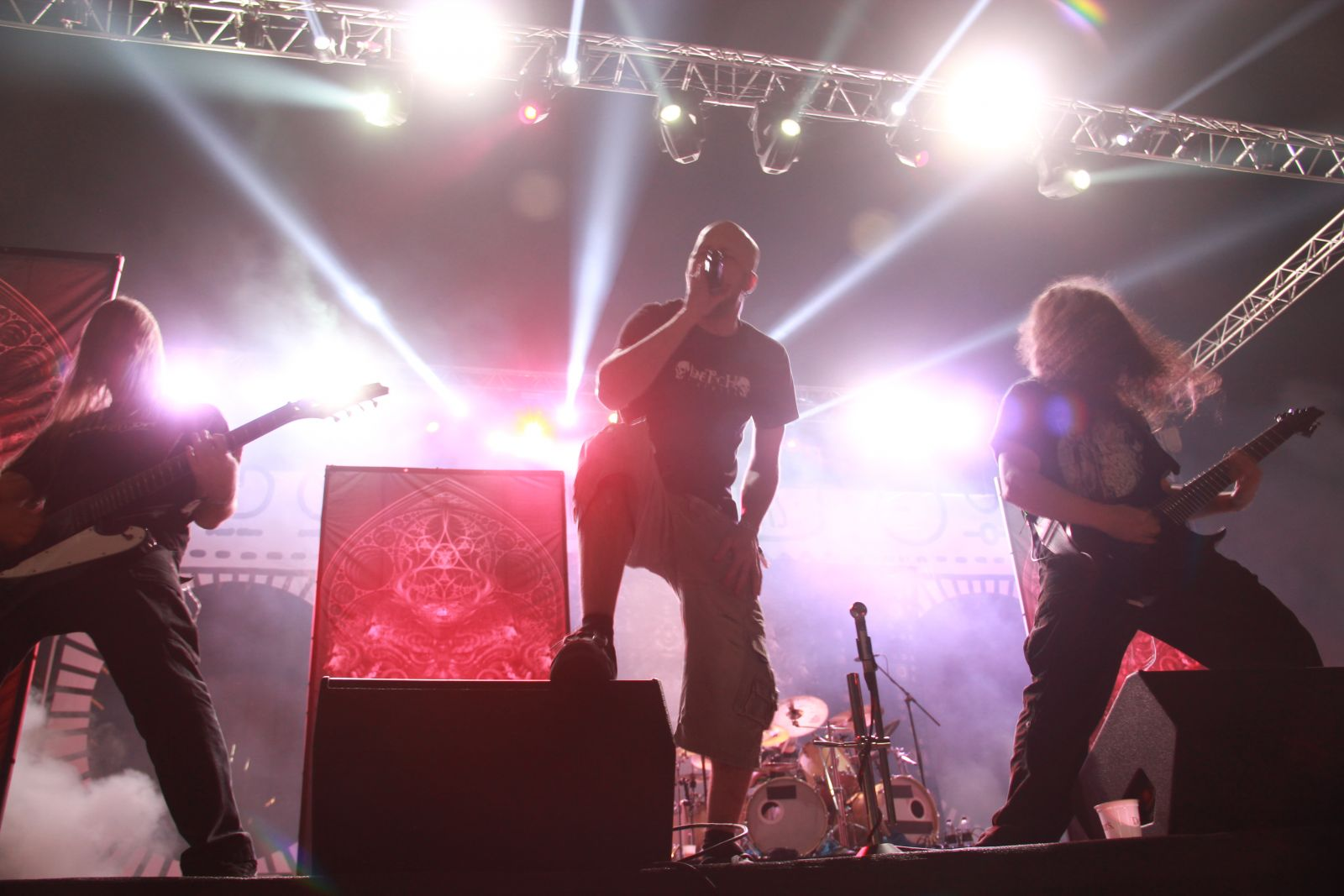
Meshuggah

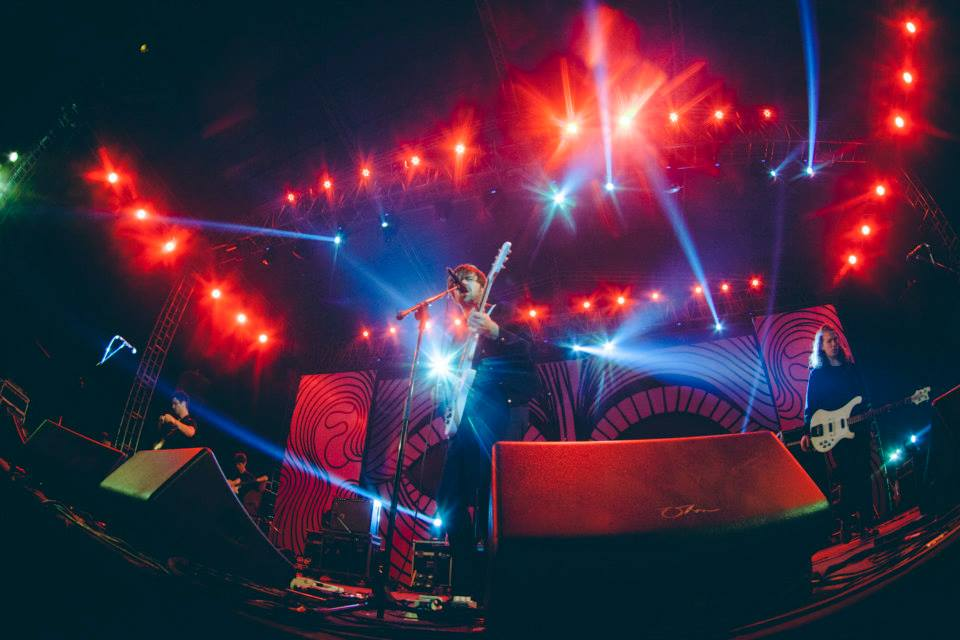
The Vaccines

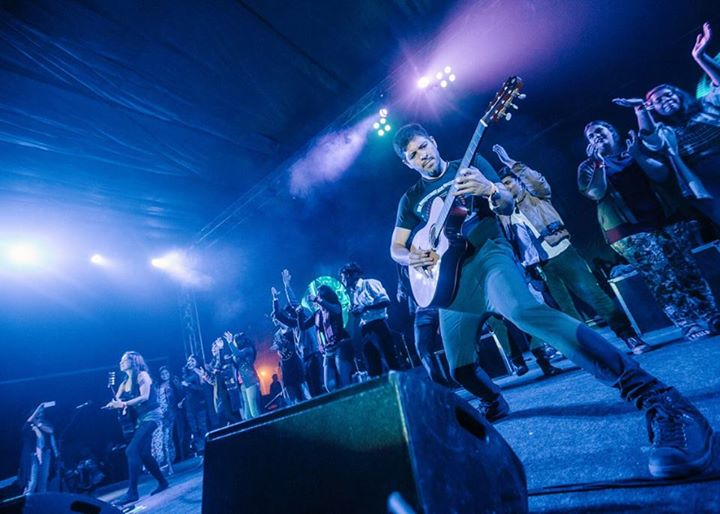
Rodrigo y Gabriela (2015)

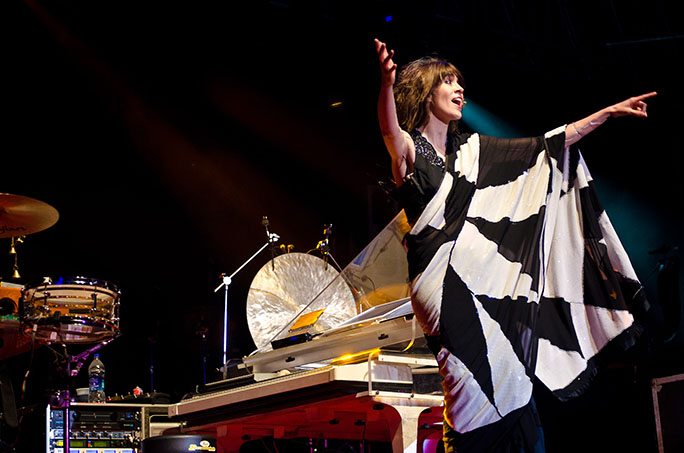
Imogen Heap
