= Cardiff Big Weekend =

Former music festival in Cardiff, Wales

Cardiff's Big Weekend
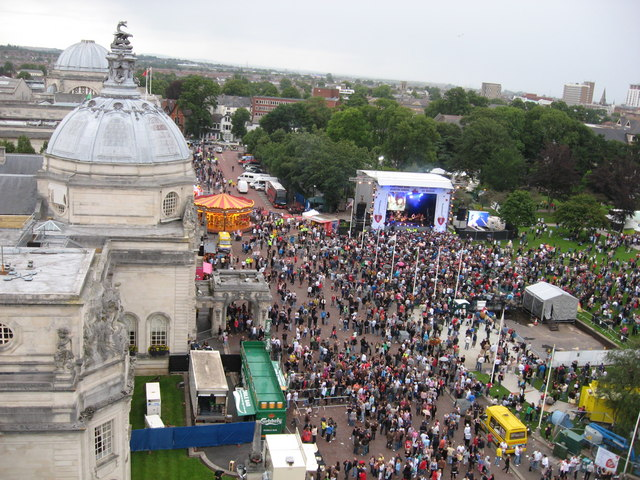
- Genre: Rock, Indie, pop, electronic, dance, hip hop, folk, experimental, metal, world
- Dates: August (exact date varies)
- Locations: Cardiff, Wales, United Kingdom
- Years active: 1995–2011, 2017
- Website: pridecymru.co.uk

The Cardiff Big Weekend took place annually from 1993 to 2011, and in 2017 as part of the Cardiff Festival organized by Cardiff Council. The event was free, and lasted three days. As well as music over the weekend, there were fair rides on site, and firework displays.

In 2004 the Admiral Group began to sponsor the event, and continued to do so until 2011. This sponsorship led to the event later being titled the Admiral Cardiff Big Weekend.

Alongside the event a competition held by Cardiff Council's event team gave the opportunity for bands to perform at the Big Weekend. The Big Gig was launched in June 2011, and had a category for under 18s and over 18s. In 2011 there were over 60 entrants and the over 18 finalists competed at The Globe, Cardiff.

== The Line Up ==
=== 2017 ===
Pride Cymru brought back the Big Weekend music festival and included their LGBT Pride Parade to reform it as 'Pride Cymru's Big Weekend'. Cardiff City Hall's Lawn, which was located at the end of the official Pride Parade route, was the venue.

| Friday 25 August | Saturday 26 August | Sunday 27 August |
|---|---|---|
| Fun Lovin Criminals | Bright Light Bright Light | Charlotte Church |
| Last Orders | Tribute Bands (various) | Zervas & Pepper |
| Lost & Found | | Blair Dunlop |
| AFISHAL & Judge Jules | | Jordan Gray |
| | | Leighton Jones |

=== 2012 ===
The Cardiff Big Weekend, which is usually held the second weekend in August as part of Cardiff Festival, was "rested" for a year in 2012 due to the Olympic Football games taking place at the Millennium Stadium (in Cardiff) on 9 and 10 August. In 2013, the music festival was axed and replaced with a temporary 'Beach' area in Cardiff Bay's Roald Dahl Plass.

=== 2011 ===
| Friday 5 August | Saturday 6 August | Sunday 7 August |
|---|---|---|
| Death Before Sunrise | Zong Zing All Stars | Ffred Jones |
| OK | Dom Duff | Edei |
| Attack! Attack! | Jazz Jamaica with Special Guest Myrna Hague | King Charles |
| Funeral For a Friend | Hayley Scarlett | Friends Electric |
| | Horace Andy & Dub Asante | Dodgy |
| | Vintage Trouble | Nerina Pallot |
| | Gabrielle | The Feeling |

=== 2010 ===
| Friday 30 July | Saturday 31 July | Sunday 1 August |
|---|---|---|
| Samoans | Maroon Town | The Lay-Lows |
| Racehorses | Wonderbrass | Rumer |
| Los Campesinos! | The Raghu Dixit Project | Pete Lawrie |
| The Blackout | The Congo Allstars | Fenech Soler |
| | Alejandro Toledo and the Magic Tombolinos | The Phenomenal Handclap Band |
| | The Jolly Boys | Athlete |
| | Pee Wee Ellis and the Funky Assembly | Feeder |
| | Chaka Demus and Pliers | |

=== 2009 ===
| Friday 31 July | Saturday 1 August | Sunday 2 August |
|---|---|---|
| Save Your Breath | Soukous Koumbele | Steve Appleton |
| The Joy Formidable | Peatbog Faeries | Absent Elk |
| Attack! Attack! | Chancery Blame & The Gadgo Club | The Leisure Society |
| Kids In Glass Houses | Melopark | Ebony Bones! |
| | Orquesta Cache | Camera Obscura |
| | Edward II | The Lightning Seeds |
| | Imelda May | The Zutons |

=== 2008 ===
| Friday 1 August | Saturday 2 August | Sunday 3 August |
|---|---|---|
| Park Bench Social Club | Pandemonium | Frizbee |
| Juice - with caller Dave Parsons | Natacha Atlas | Yoav |
| The Men They Couldn't Hang | Robert Maseko & The Congo Beat | Beth Rowley |
| | Ryland Teifi | Go Audio |
| | Grupo Lokito | The Automatic |
| | Prince Buster and the Delroy Williams Junction Band | Glasvegas |
| | | Young Knives |
| | | Ash |

=== 2007 ===
| Friday 3 August | Saturday 4 August | Sunday 5 August |
|---|---|---|
| PeeWee Ellis | SW Storm | Gethin Pearson |
| Bobby Kray | Los Skarameros | Colum Regan |
| Soul II Soul Soundsystem | The Soothsayers | Halflight |
| | Sierra Maestro | The Storys |
| | Jimmy Cliff | Ben Taylor |
| | | Richie Havens |
| | | Sandi Thom |
| | | Magic Numbers |

=== 2006 ===
| Friday 4 August | Saturday 5 August | Sunday 6 August |
|---|---|---|
| The Selecter | Daisy Blue | Unkle Bob |
| Katrina (formerly of Katrina and the Waves) | Viva Machine | Mukka |
| The Alarm | Alongcameman | Foy Vance |
| | Memory Lane Music Mix Winners | Los Pacaminos featuring Paul Young |
| | The Poppies | Terri Walker |
| | Cord | Stereo MCs |
| | The Crimea | Cerys Matthews |
| | The Infadels | |
| | The Automatic | |
| | Kubb | |

=== 2005 ===
| Friday 12 August | Saturday 13 August | Sunday 14 August |
|---|---|---|
| | | Beverley Knight |

Line up also included Chesney Hawkes, Hazel O’Connor, The Christians and Modern Romance.

=== 2004 ===
| Friday 30 July | Saturday 31 July | Sunday 1 August |
|---|---|---|
| Bad Manners | Red Dragon Roadshow | Cherry Falls |
| Chas 'n' Dave | Dynamo Dresden | D?booga |
| Howard Jones | Speedway | The Jews Brothers |
| | Zoot Woman | Caramelo Son |
| | The Delays | Rhian Benson |
| | The Fun Lovin' Criminals | The Brand New Heavies |

=== 2003 ===
| Friday 1 August | Saturday 2 August | Sunday 3 August |
|---|---|---|
| Big Mac's Wholly Soul Band | Red Dragon Roadshow | The Elephant is Gerald |
| Limahl | Ayra | Shod |
| Go West | LSK | King Pleasure and the Biscuit Boys |
| | The Bees | La Bottine Souriante |
| | Athlete | The Proclaimers |
| | The Bluetones | The Waterboys |

=== 2002 ===
| Friday 2 August | Saturday 3 August | Sunday 4 August |
|---|---|---|
| Barker | | Ray Davies |

=== 2001 ===
| Friday 3 August | Saturday 4 August | Sunday 5 August |
|---|---|---|
| Tommy & the Chauffeur | Red Dragon Roadshow | Nick Turner Allstars |
| Tetra Splendour | Maximum Roach | Black Umfolosi |
| Lostprophets | I am Kloot | Jazz Jamaica All Stars |
| Gorky's Zygotic Mynci | Kosheen | TBC ??? |
| | EMF | Deacon Blue |

=== 2000 ===
| Friday 4 August | Saturday 5 August | Sunday 6 August |
|---|---|---|
| Kennedy Soundtrack | Nucleus Roots | Motimba |
| Baby Elephant | Rae & Christian | Kakatsitsi |
| Bench | Chumbawamba | Arrow |
| Manchild | Asian Dub Foundation | Victor Hugo & La Banda Picante |
| Ptang Yang Kipper Bang | Kris Jenkins | Aswad |

=== 1999 ===
| Friday 6 August | Saturday 7 August | Sunday 8 August |
|---|---|---|
| Rocket Gold Star | Red Dragon FM Party in the Park | Four Brothers |
| Cartoon | Indian Ropeman | Vocal Sampling |
| Quattro | The Herbaliser | Groupa Folia |
| Big Leaves | Afro Celt Sound System | Black Star Liner |
| | | King Pleasure |
| | | Nik Kershaw |

=== 1998 ===
| Friday 7 August | Saturday 8 August | Sunday 9 August |
|---|---|---|
| Armstrong | Red Dragon Roadshow | Loop Guru |
| Diesel Bug | Fisherman Walk | Mutton Birds |
| Manchild | Melys | Osibisa |
| Ether | Carrie | Leo Sayer |
| | Audioweb | Carleen Anderson |
| | Gene | |

=== 1997 ===
| Friday August 8 | Saturday August 9 | Sunday August 10 |
|---|---|---|
| Trippa | Red Dragon Roadshow | Christine Collister |
| Planet Loaded | Rachel Stamp | Tony Hadley |
| Revolva | Don | Sam Brown |
| The Blinders | Ether | Afro Celt Sound System |
| Stereophonics | Death in Vegas | Urban Species |
| | Dreadzone | Omar |

=== 1996 ===
| Friday August 9 | Saturday August 10 | Sunday August 11 |
|---|---|---|
| Leighton Jones | James Taylor Quartet | Railroad Bill |
| Flow Motion | Super Furry Animals | |
| Pocket Devils | Spice Girls | |
| Dog | Pato Banton | |
| | 4 Man Do | |
| | Upside Down | |

=== 1995 ===
| Thursday August 10 | Friday August 11 | Saturday August 12 | Sunday August 13 |
|---|---|---|---|
| Dub War | A Night At The Opera | Chumbawamba | Carter USM |
| 60 ft Dolls | Time Flies House Party | Hugh Cornwall | Corduroy |
| Super Furry Animals | | The Dharmas | FNAAZ |
| | | Galaxy 101 Showcase feat Danii Minogue + The Spice Girls etc | Waste Ayinde Marshall |
| | | The Underdogs | Backbone |
| | | Fat Barry's Soul Band | H-Kippers |
