= Aswekeepsearching =

Indian post-rock band

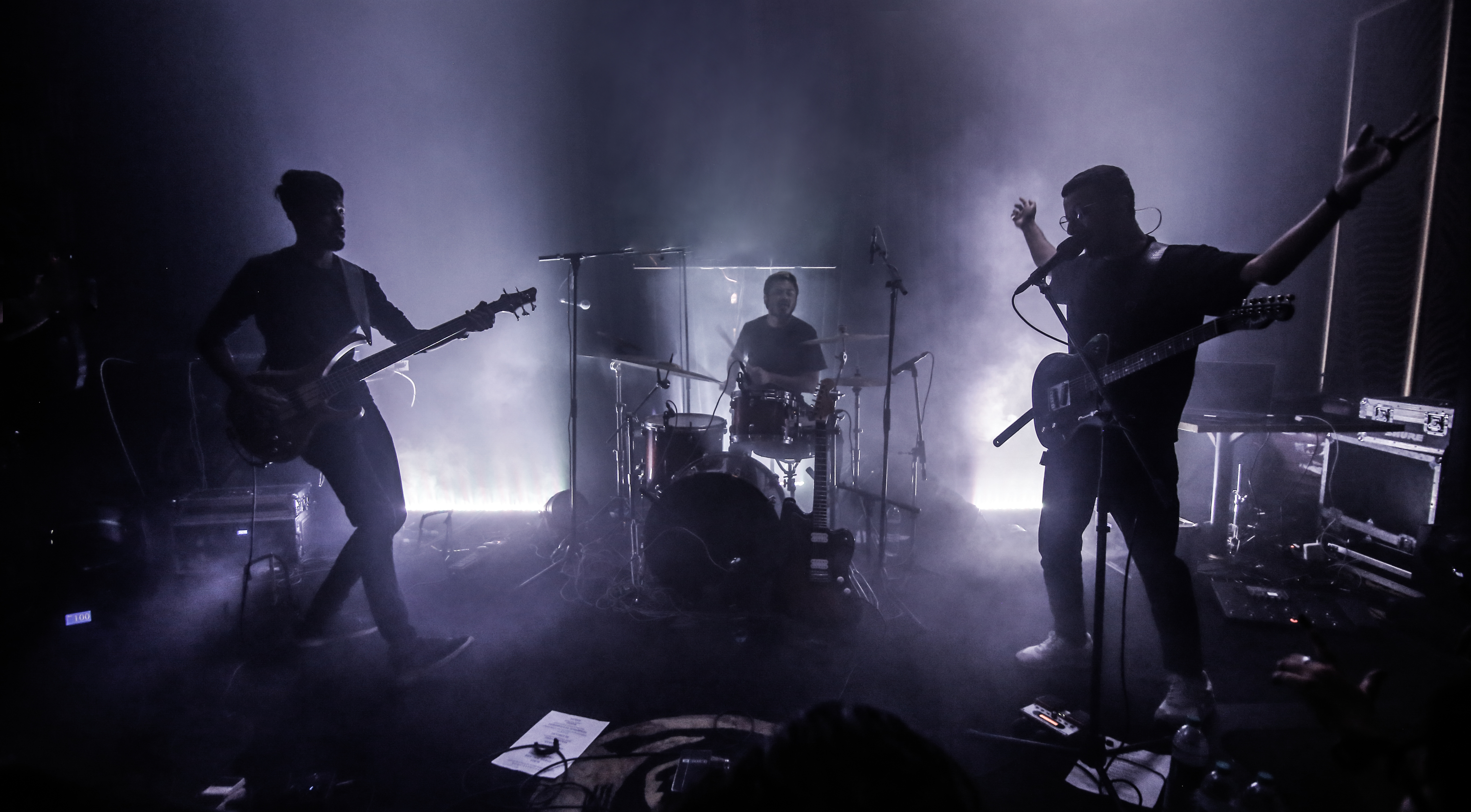
- Aswekeepsearching performing in 2021

Background information
- Also known as: AWKS
- Origin: Ahmedabad, Gujarat, India
- Genres: Rock; post-rock; ambient
- Years active: 2013–present
- Members: Uddipan Sarmah; Robert Alex; Shubham Gurung
- Past members: Sambit Chatterjee; Gautam Deb; Ashwin Naidu; Tushar Verma
- Website: aswekeepsearching.in

Aswekeepsearching (stylized aswekeepsearching; often abbreviated as AWKS; pronounced "As We Keep Searching") is an Indian post-rock band formed in Ahmedabad in September 2013 as a home studio project by vocalist and guitarist Uddipan Sarmah and ex-guitarist and keyboardist Shubham Gurung. They have released four studio albums and two EPs.

The band has shared the stage with notable acts such as Incubus, Fever 333, Textures, Caspian, God Is an Astronaut, Steven Wilson, 65daysofstatic, pg.lost, Tides of Man, Sleepmakeswaves, the Contortionist, Plini, Katy Perry, Dua Lipa and many more. Their fresh and emotive approach to the post-rock genre followed by their live performances have achieved notable success in India and internationally.

== Career ==
=== 2013–2014: Formation, early years and Growing Suspicions ===
In September 2013, the band began as a home studio project by vocalist and guitarist Uddipan Sarmah and keyboardist and guitarist Shubham Gurung in Ahmedabad, Gujarat. The band released their debut EP Growing Suspicions in February 2014 featuring six tracks and two bonus tracks. Uddipan and Shubham were joined by their friends Ashwin Naidu on the drums and Tushar Verma on the bass to play a couple of live shows in their home city.

=== 2015–2016: Khwaab and Russia Tour ===
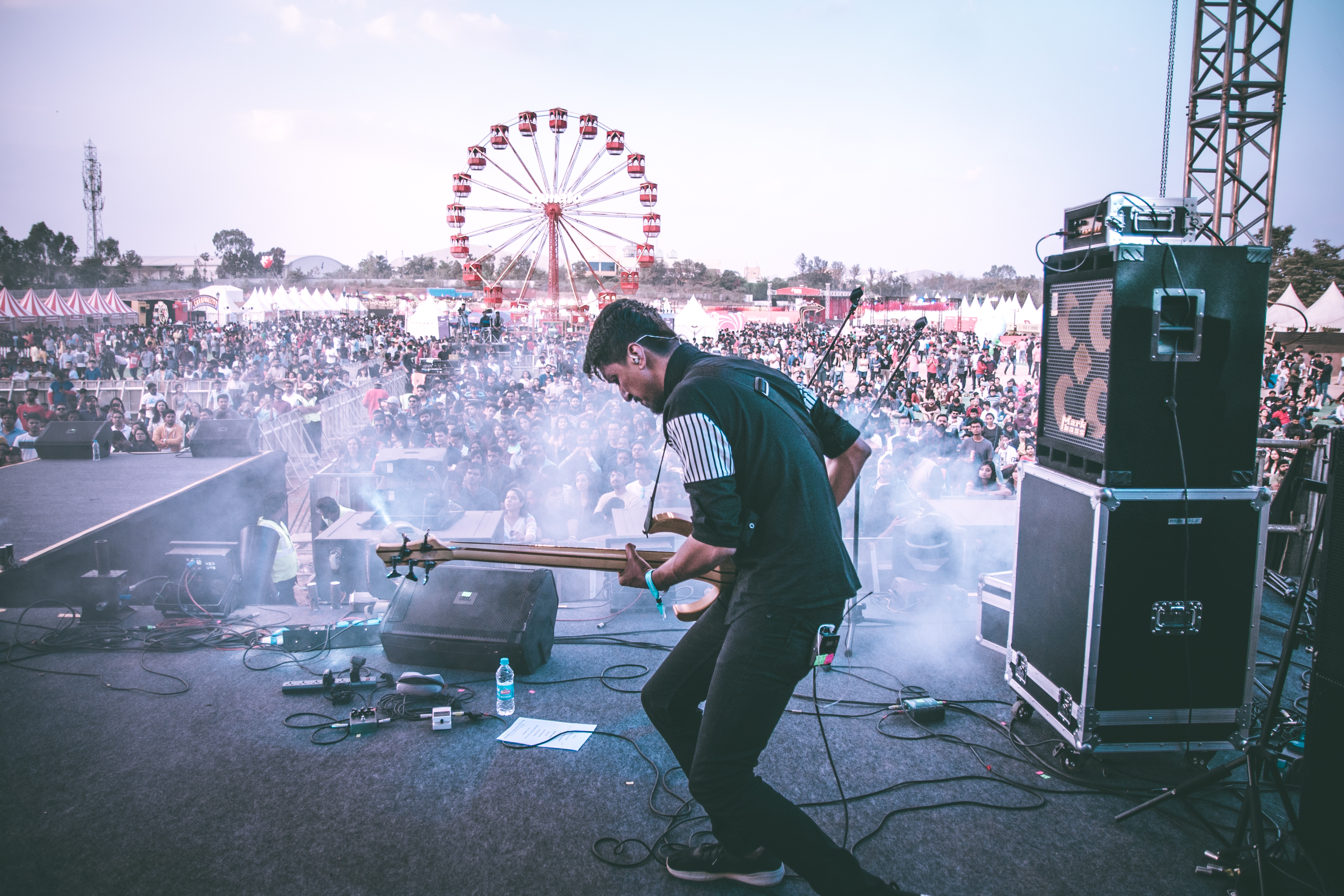
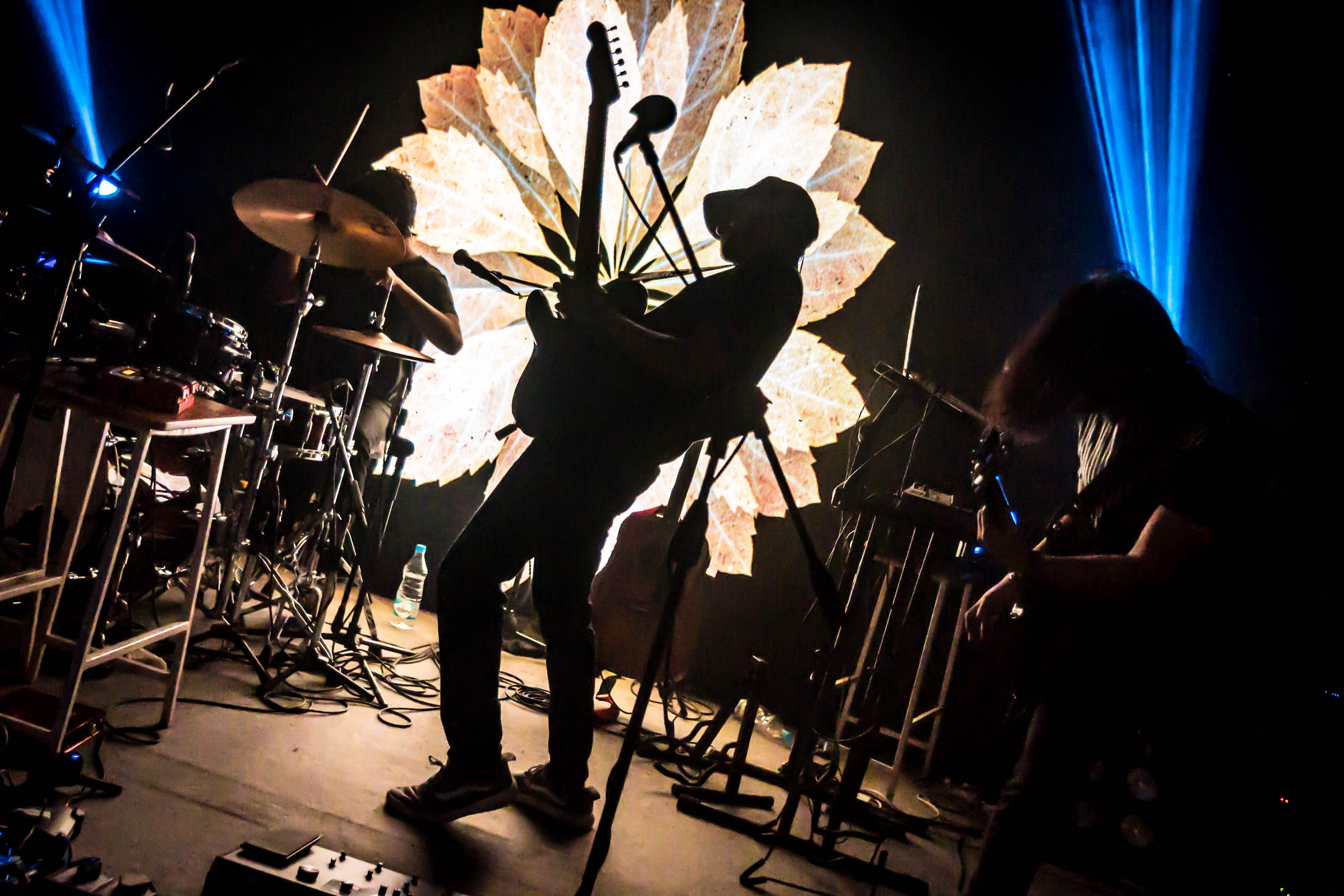
Robert Alex (top) and Uddipan Sarmah (bottom)

2015 saw the band come together as a live act with Robert Alex and Gautam Deb (from prominent Pune-based experimental metal band Noiseware) joining as members, ultimately leading to the launch of Aswekeepsearching's first full-length release titled Khwaab (meaning "Dream"). Noiseware's guitarist/producer Adhiraj Singh tracked the album at Refractor Studio in Pune and joined the band as their live sound engineer. The release of Khwaab was the moment that led to the start of a change in the Indian independent music circuit. With the music spreading like wildfire owing to its fresh and emotive approach, the band redefined the touring culture in India; taking their music to a multitude of cities locally and also embarking on their first-ever overseas 5-city Russian Tour where the band performed in Saint Petersburg, Moscow, Kazan, Ekaterinburg and again in Moscow for their last show.

=== 2017–2018: Zia and Europe Tour ===
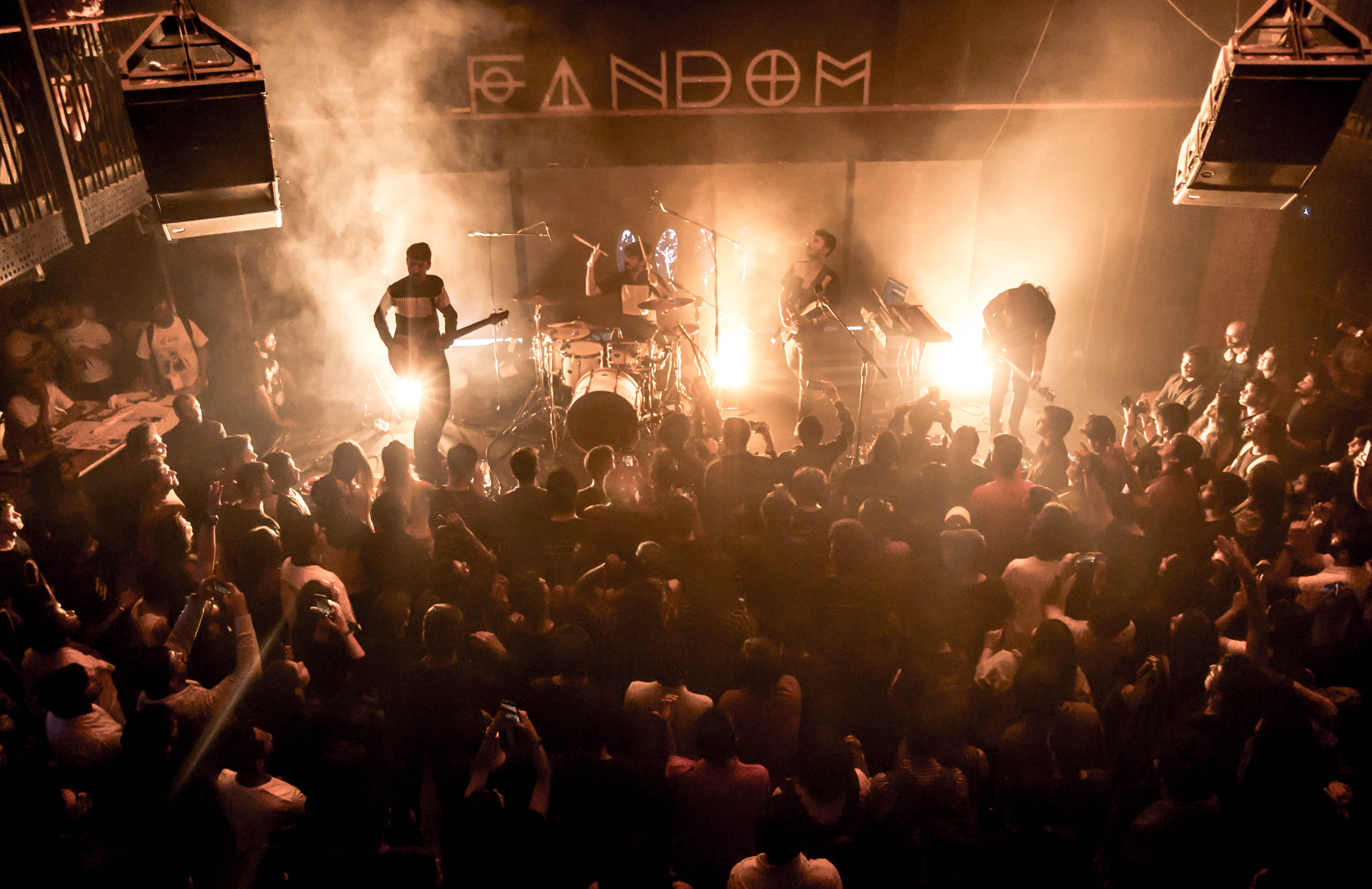
Aswekeepsearching playing in Bangalore, India in 2019.

The extensive touring schedule of Khwaab brought them their sophomore record Zia (meaning "Light") – an eleven-track album birthed from the shared experiences of the band. Zia was released in April 2017 and gained appreciation from critics and fans alike. Expanding the sonic landscape, the band collaborated with like-minded artists on select songs, introducing Indian instrumentation such as the tabla and sitar into their already diverse soundscape. This made for a unique and enthralling listening experience for a global audience, setting a standard for modern post-rock. Prior to the release of the album, Uddipan hosted a "Zia // Storytelling & Listening Session Tour" where he visited 13 cities and hosted a listening session to a select number of fans. The sessions were held in living rooms and jam pads. Post-release, the band went on to extensively tour, from selling out venues on their album launch tour to performing at premiere music festivals in India such as NH7 Weekender and VH1 Supersonic.

In May 2018, the band embarked on their second overseas 15 City tour across Europe with shows at notable post-rock outings like Dunk! Festival (Belgium) and Pelagic Fest (Germany); the band made a lasting impression on Europe. After returning from Europe, the band did the seven-city Homecoming Tour where they covered cities like Delhi, Bangalore, Mumbai, Pune, Hyderabad, Guwahati and Shillong.

=== 2019: Rooh, Sambit’s entry in the band and the Rooh India Tour ===
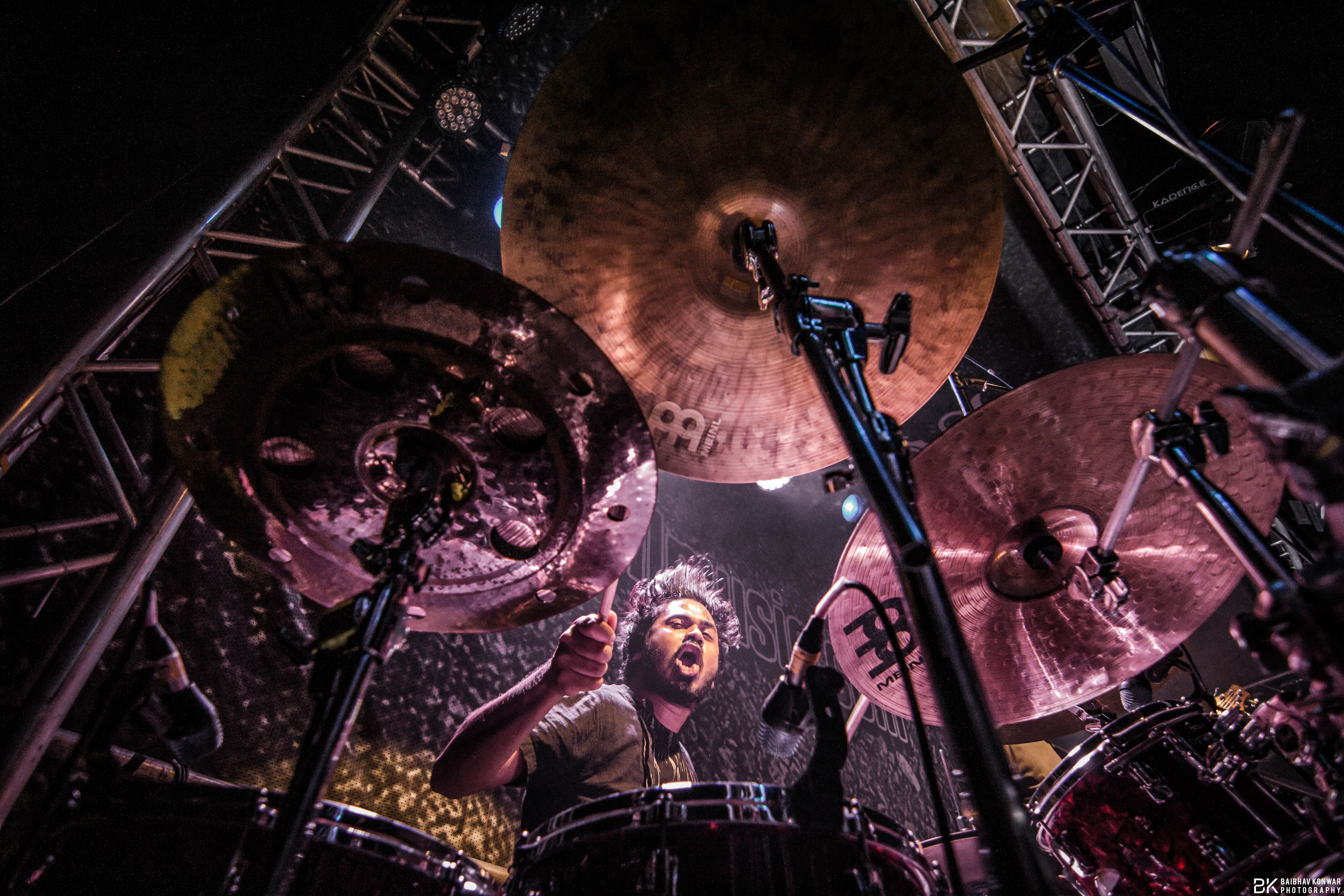
Sambit Chatterjee

In May 2019, the band embarked on a five-city tour covering Mumbai, Delhi, Pune, Bangalore and Kolkata. Later in July, after four years of being together, Gautam Deb left the band after finishing the drum tracking for their third album. The band's longtime friend and collaborator Sambit Chatterjee joined the band as the drummer. Prior to the release of the album, Uddipan once again hosted an album listening session and this time covered 20 cities. Finally, Rooh (meaning "Soul"), an eight-song album, was released in September 2019. The band then went on to tour nine cities across India – Guwahati, Shillong, Mumbai, Hyderabad, Delhi, Bangalore, Kolkata, Kohima and Pune – promoting Rooh, headlined numerous college festivals at prestigious institutions like the IITs, and also performed at the debut edition of the OnePlus Music Festival held at DY Patil Stadium, Mumbai in November, where they got to share the stage with the likes of Amit Trivedi, Dua Lipa and Katy Perry.

=== 2020: Sleep ===
While travelling to different cities for their performances, work on new music had already begun. In December 2019, the band laid the foundations for their next full-length release, in which they wanted to touch on the topic of mental health and its importance. In January 2020 they began the recording and pre-production process for the album Sleep, which released on 17 April 2020. The release of Sleep also saw the parting of ways with guitarist Shubham Gurung, as he wanted to focus his energies on his spiritual path. In July 2020, the band spearheaded the campaign #foryourmind where they collaborated with independent artists like Hanita Bhambri, Raghav Meattle, Polar Lights, Mali, Aditi Ramesh, Bloodywood, FOI, Street Stories, Gaurav Tophakhane, Swarathma and others across the country in an effort to raise awareness on mental health and wellness.

=== 2025-present: Kyun? ===
In July 2025, the band released Kyun? (meaning "Why?"), a ten-track album marking the band's first long-form release since Sleep(2020). The album reflected on the band's decade-long journey , exploring themes of personal memories, hardship, uncertainty and perseverance. Musically, it continued the band's blend of Hindi-language songwriting and post-rock, incorporating string arrangements and ambient passages. Tracks such as "shayad bhool gaye", "into the mind", "nature of life" and "of unsaid farewells" highlighted the album's guitar-driven sound and atmospheric elements.

In October 2026, Gautam Deb and the band announce getting back together as the former resuming his duties as the resident drummer with a cryptic instagram post and makes it known that they will be touring soon.

== Members ==
=== Current members ===
- Uddipan Sarmah – vocals, guitars (2013–present)
- Robert Alex – bass (2015–present)
- Gautam Deb – drums, percussion (2015–2019 & 2026-present)

=== Former members ===
- Sambit Chatterjee – drums, percussions (2017–2026)
- Shubham Gurung – guitars, keyboards (2013–2020)
- Ashwin Naidu – drums (2013–2015)
- Tushar Verma – bass (2013–2015)

== Discography ==
=== Studio albums ===
Khwaab (2015)

No.	Title	Length
1.	"Ativa"	7:17
2.	"In Circles"	5:33
3.	"We Sound Like Strangers"	5:57
4.	"Other Side"	4:52
5.	"When Will They Talk?"	4:35
6.	"Catalogues"	5:33
7.	"Banshee"	6:35
8.	"What If_?"	4:46
9.	"Life = Parallels"	3:00
10.	"The Moment"	1:50
11.	"B-303"	5:29
Total length:		55:27

Zia (2017)

No.	Title	Length
1.	"And Then Came Spring"	5:48
2.	"Sleep / / Awake"	4:29
3.	"Uns"	4:41
4.	"There You Are"	3:27
5.	"Reminiscence"	4:38
6.	"Kalga"	7:11
7.	"A New Solace"	4:17
8.	"Hope Unfolds"	5:05
9.	"Lights & Colors"	4:00
10.	"Sometime Somewhere"	4:51
11.	"Ascend"	4:06
Total length:		52:33

Rooh (2019)

No.	Title	Length
1.	"Chasing Light"	5:31
2.	"Green and Blue"	4:04
3.	"Aas Paas"	5:59
4.	"Eneke Najaaba"	2:26
5.	"Rooh"	4:10
6.	"A Night in Zottegem"	4:08
7.	"Aitbaar"	5:10
8.	"Gangtey"	2:17
Total length:		33:45

Sleep (2020)

No.	Title	Length
1.	"Glued"	4:17
2.	"11 Degrees"	3:52
3.	"Dreams Are Real"	3:33
4.	"Sleep Now"	4:37
5.	"How Am I Supposed to Know" (featuring Ajay Jayanthi)	4:47
6.	"Let Us Try" (featuring Ajay Jayanthi)	3:49
7.	"Maybe There"	3:46
8.	"Sleep Again" (featuring Ajay Jayanthi)	5:01
Total length:		33:42

kyun? (2025)

No.	Title	Length
1.	"why?"	2:35
2.	"you left something"	6:23
3.	"into the mind"	4:07
4.	"enter the heart"	5:52
5.	"nature of life"	5:49
6.	"happiness > god"	5:02
7.	"the search"	4:36
8.	"i'm here, with you!"	5:28
9.	"shayad bhool gaye"	5:18
10.	"of unsaid farewells"	3:36
Total length:		48:46

=== EPs ===
Growing Suspicions (2014)

No.	Title	Length
1.	"The Tattva"	6:36
2.	"In Circles"	6:09
3.	"Shimmer of Light"	3:26
4.	"When Will They Talk?"	4:25
5.	"Banshee"	6:37
6.	"Aakorxon"	5:36
7.	"The Tattva (Leroi Mix)"	4:03
8.	"Aakorxon (Leroi Mix)"	4:40
Total length:		41:32

IIII (2020)

No.	Title	Length
1.	"Ativa - Reprised Version"	5:10
2.	"Reminiscence - Reprised Version"	5:33
3.	"Rooh - Reprised Version"	3:17
Total length:		14:00

=== Singles ===
"At Long Last" (2016)

No.	Title	Length
1.	"At Long Last"	3:15
Total length:		3:15

"The Tattva (Remastered)" (2019)

No.	Title	Length
1.	"The Tattva (Remastered)"	5:58
Total length:		5:58
