= Zervas and Pepper =

Welsh musical duo

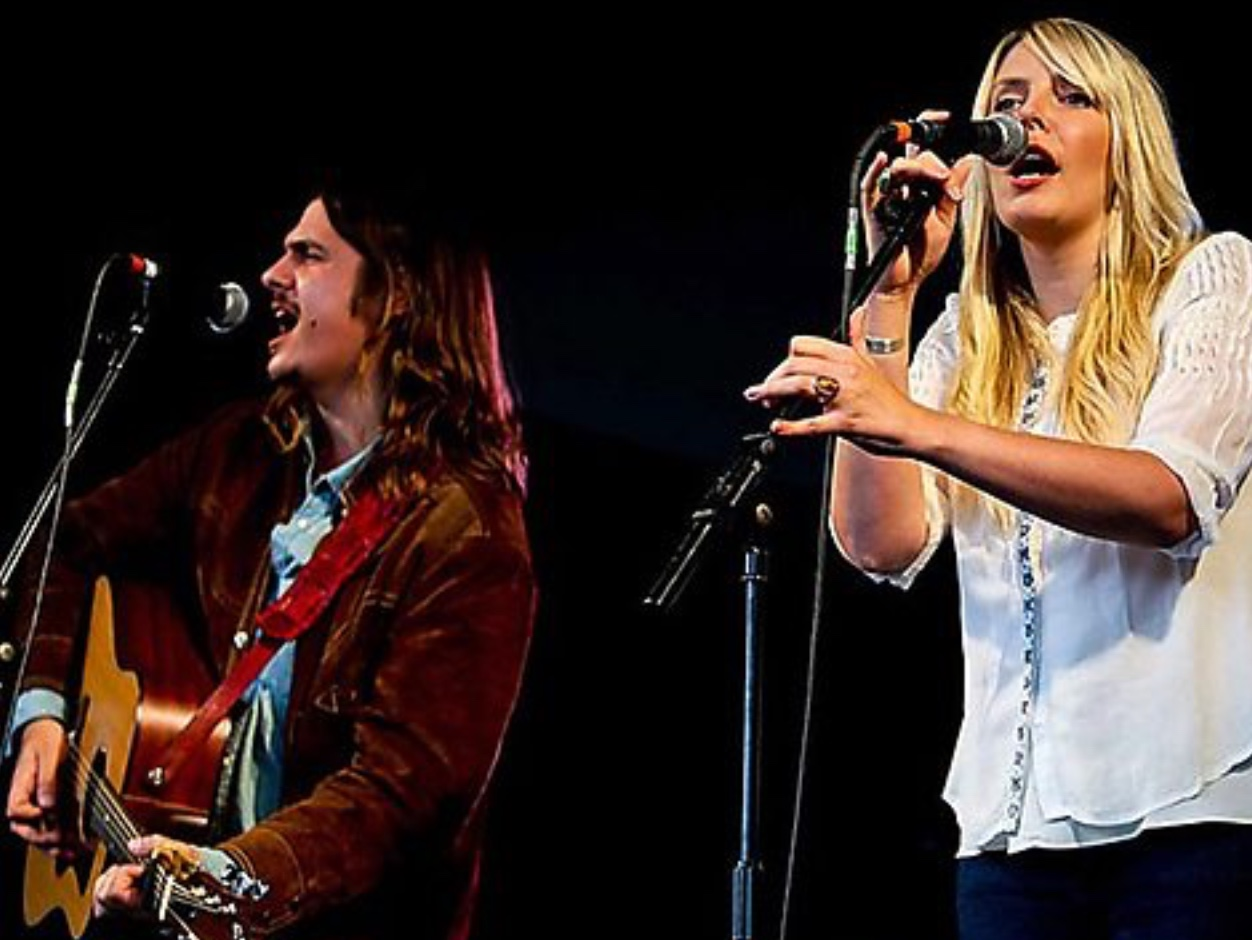
- Paul Zervas and Kathryn Pepper at Hyde Park, 8 September 2013 during BBC Radio 2's "Live in Hyde Park"

Background information
- Origin: Cardiff, Wales
- Genres: Folk rock
- Years active: 2007-present
- Label: Zerodeo Music
- Members: Paul Zervas; Kathryn Pepper
- Website: Zervas and Pepper

Zervas and Pepper are a musical duo from Cardiff, Wales, who formed in late 2007. They play as a two-piece outfit or a full band, and have a strong and growing presence on the UK-wide live circuit and international airtime, including appearances at theatres and festivals such as Glastonbury Festival and Green Man Festival, and regular national radio appearances.

== History ==
=== 2007–2010: Formation and early performances ===
Zervas and Pepper formed in late 2007, born out of singer-songwriters Paul Zervas and Kathryn Pepper's shared love of harmony-heavy folk rock. The couple discovered one another while performing in their home town clubs in Cardiff in their native Wales as solo artists, first meeting in the Toucan Club, and decided to write and perform their own original songs as a duo. They began writing and recording together as Zervas and Pepper, and their first release was an introductory EP on the independent "Zerodeo Records" label in 2008 with the help of well-regarded Welsh producer Kriss Jenkins. The duo started selling out local live shows and released a second EP on the same label in 2009, whilst gaining a significant local following.

=== 2011–2013: Debut album and establishment ===
Following this encouraging reception, Zervas and Pepper released their debut album Somewhere in the City in Spring 2011 to positive feedback, and attracting interest in the music press and on national radio. Somewhere in the City gained strong radio support, and BBC Radio Wales soon picked up on Zervas and Pepper, leading to three play-listed singles from BBC Radio Wales and further air play on BBC Radio 6 Music and BBC Radio 2. The singles "Cigar Store Indian", "Buffalo Crow" and "Startin' Over" led to appearances on the popular BBC 6 Radcliffe and Maconie show, BBC Radio 2's Terry Wogan's "Wake up to Wogan" and Janice Long. The band were soon featured in session for Lauren Laverne on BBC 6 Music, which later featured in the radio station's "Best Bits of 2012".

=== 2013–2015: Second album and touring ===
Zervas and Pepper released their second album, Lifebringer, on 22 July 2013. with the addition of their full band. Featured musicians included guitarist Jonathan "Catfish" Thomas as featured on Super Furry Animals, drummer Jack Egglestone of Future of the Left, Andrew Brown on bass and Simon Kingman on lead guitar. The album received a positive critical reception, with Paul Zervas citing it as "more of an escape from reality" than the band's previous work and Blackpennymusic calling it "a very satisfying listen". This second LP gained critical acclaim from press and radio, with a 4 star review in The Times by Will Hodgkinson, who described it as "a gentle soundtrack to the modern experience". The album was also featured in The Guardian's end-of-year list "2013's Hidden Gems; The ones that got away". Lifebringer received a nomination for the Welsh Music Prize in August 2013, and the band won the public vote for the Amazing Radio Audition Poll in Summer 2013. The Single Release, "Sure Fire Bet", earned the band National Radio playlist inclusions on BBC Radio 2 and RTÉ One in Ireland.

Throughout 2013, Zervas and Pepper continued to appear live at festivals and theatres as a 2 or 6 piece outfit, including Glastonbury Festival on the Croissant Neuf stage in 2013, with a full band main stage appearance at Green Man Festival and performance at BBC Radio 2's "Live at Hyde Park Festival 2013" in London alongside an introduction by DJ "Whispering" Bob Harris. Further gigs and festivals performed later that year included the Bacardi NH7 Weekender in Delhi, India, November 2013 and an appearance on Don Letts' BBC Radio 6 show "The Don's Picks of 2013" with the track "Living In A Small Town".

In early 2014 the duo performed as part of Scotland's annual Celtic Connections festival in Glasgow, and were featured as part of the "Roaming Roots Revue" California Dreaming show at the Glasgow Royal Concert Hall alongside artists such as Dawes, Roddy Hart, Lau and The Webb Sisters. Zervas and Pepper also performed two further live "In the round" acoustic performances, broadcast as part of the festival for Mark Radcliffe's BBC Radio 2 "Folk Show" and Ricky Ross's "Another Country" for BBC Radio Scotland.

Further UK Festival appearances by Zervas and Pepper in Summer 2014 included performances at the Secret Garden Party in Cambridgeshire, Beautiful Days festival in Devon, a hometown show for the Welsh Proms at Cardiff's prestigious St David's Hall and a Main Stage performance at Moseley Folk Festival with other artists such as Richard Thompson and The Felice Brothers. The band appeared in a prerecorded Bob Harris BBC Radio 2 Sunday Session on 3 August 2014, playing "These Blurred Lines", "Ghost Dancer" and "Look Out Mountain". Additional radio play included airplay on Donn Letts BBC Radio 6 Music. Recording began for Zervas and Pepper's forthcoming third album "Abstract Heart" in July and August 2014 at Giant Wafer studios, Powys.

Autumn 2014 saw Zervas and Pepper announce their tour, providing support for folk singer-songwriter Seth Lakeman's "Word of Mouth" UK tour. Later in November and December 2014 they would tour as a five-piece band supporting Scottish pop legends Deacon Blue on their "A New House" Tour, performing at UK music venues such as Royal Festival Hall London, O2 Apollo Manchester, Symphony Hall Birmingham, and culminating with a show in December 2014 at Liverpool's Echo Arena. During this period, Zervas and began work on their third album, and subsequently released the singles "These Blurred Lines" and "We Are One", both of which garnered much radio support and playlist inclusions from BBC Radio Wales and RTÉ Radio 1, Donn Letts' BBC Radio 6 Music, with Terry Wogan on BBC Radio 2 in November 2014 playing the first spin of "We Are One", along with a live session for the Richard Madeley show on BBC Radio 2.

=== 2015-present: Abstract Heart and Wilderland ===
Zervas and Pepper started 2015 with a return to Cardiff for an album launch show of their third album, Abstract Heart, at The Globe, Cardiff, followed by a pre-release and airplay in February 2015 of "Celestial Friend" on the BBC Radio 2 Huey Morgan Show with Paul Sexton. The single "Abstract Heart" was debuted by Don Letts on his BBC Radio 6 Music show in March 2015, along with a radio debut of "Here and Now" on "Another Country with Ricky Ross" on BBC Radio Scotland, and live airplay on the Alan Thompson show, BBC Radio Wales, which shared insight into the band's adventures around the making of "Abstract Heart", and debut songs from said album ("Abstract Heart", "Reach Out", "Laika" and "Miller"), alongside an appearance from Steve Hackett of Genesis. This radio coverage set the pace for Zervas and Pepper's imminent tour in the UK, and their release of "Abstract Heart" on channels such as iTunes and Amazon. "Abstract Heart" received 220 playlist inclusions in the USA, including KCSB-FM, KWCW, KTSW, WVIA, TuneIn, and WUNH. The band also released a music video for Abstract Heart in April 2015, and Abstract Heart was featured in in-flight entertainment for the airline Emirates during Summer 2015. Reviews included a 4 star review from Fred Dellar in Mojo (magazine).

Zervas and Pepper's first full band headline tour began in Spring 2015, commencing in Manchester in April 2015, during which time they garnered a 4 Star review for Abstract Heart from Guitarist Magazine and a write-up in the Progressive Folk section of Classic Rock Magazine. March 2015 saw the band play their first live in-store session at Spillers Records, Cardiff, which involved a short, stripped-back acoustic set of songs from Abstract Heart and album signings, followed by a radio session with Mark Radcliffe from Radcliffe and Maconie at BBC Radio 6 Music on the first day of their 2015 UK tour commencing in the North of England. The band sprang into May 2015 with a full band show at The Globe, Cardiff, and proceeded to play a selection of festivals and venues throughout the Summer of 2015. Highlights included supporting Larry Carlton at Glee Clubs in Cardiff and Birmingham UK, and a performance as an acoustic duo for SummerTyne Festival at The Sage Gateshead. At the end of July 2015, Zervas and Pepper featured on BBC Radio Scotland's "The Quay Sessions" with Edith Bowman, and with a session and interview on The Tom Robinson Show on BBC Radio 6 Music. Edith Bowman would later feature the band in her first article for ELLE Magazine as an addition to her August 2015 playlist.

In Spring 2016, Zervas and Pepper took their music on tour to Germany where they played shows and sessions such as their performance and interview on Radio Bremen, Nordwestradio Sounds with Arne Schumacher. After the tour of Germany, Zervas and Pepper begin writing their fourth album in Autumn 2016, entitled Wilderland. Zervas and Pepper also featured on a charity album entitled "Pasted Beyond Recognition: The Songs of Del Amitri For SBH Scotland", featuring artists such as Travis and Tom McCrae covering Del Amitri tracks for the Spina Bifida Hydrocephalus Scotland charity.

Zervas and Peppers's fourth album, Wilderland, was released in July 2017, receiving a 3 star review in Rolling Stone Magazine, Germany and a 9.5 star review from Eclipsed Rock Magazine in August 2017. Wilderland was co-produced by David Crosby's son and "Croz" album co-writer James Raymond, who was a member of the band CPR. Zervas and Pepper's first single from Wilderland, named "Hotel Bible" was played on BBC Radio 6 Music, and featured on the BBC Radio Wales playlist in June 2016. The band toured during the summer of 2017, including Festival No. 6, Wales, and supporting Runrig during their set of open air shows around Germany. Zervas and Pepper headlined the acoustic stage at Cardiff's Burning Lantern Festival, Wales and have played various UK and European dates throughout 2017. Venues played included Sparkassenpark, Mönchengladbach, Freilichtbühne Loreley amphitheatre and Hamburg Stadtpark. They also featured on German radio stations during their tour, including a live performance for SWR1 Rheinland-Pfalz. Wilderland was named "Summer album of 2017" by Radio Bremen in Germany, "Album der Woche" by Mitteldeutscher Rundfunk, and was shortlisted in the Neutron Music Prize by God is in the TV webzine.

== Influence ==
Zervas and Pepper's 1970s, California folk-rock sound has been compared to America (band), Fleetwood Mac, Joni Mitchell, James Taylor, and Crosby, Stills, Nash and Young. The band are known for the originality and beauty of their work, and as Richard Lewis puts, "the gentle psychedelia of Buffalo Springfield". The duo describe their material as "sunny, cosmic, retro folk rock music", and as Pennyblackmusic suggest during a review of Somewhere in the City in 2013, Zervas and Pepper are known for their "exquisite vocal harmonies, interesting arrangements and highly original songs", with critics describing their sound as "perfect festival music" and "exquisite".

== Discography ==
=== Albums ===
- Somewhere in the City (May 2011)
- Lifebringer (July 2013)
- Abstract Heart (April 2015)
- Wilderland (June 2017)
- Endless Road Restless Nomad (2019)

=== EPs ===
- EP 1 EP - 4 tracks (April 2008)
- EP 2 EP - 6 tracks (August 2009)

=== Singles ===
- "Winter Forever" (November 2011)
- "Cigar Store Indian" (June 2012)
- "Buffalo Crow" (August 2012)
- "Jerome" (April 2013)
- "Sure Fire Bet" (April 2013)
- "These Blurred Lines" (Autumn 2014)
- "We Are One" (November 2014)
- "Abstract Heart" (March 2015)
- "Hotel Bible" (April 2017)
- "Citizen" (June 2017)
