= Avora Records =

Indian rock band

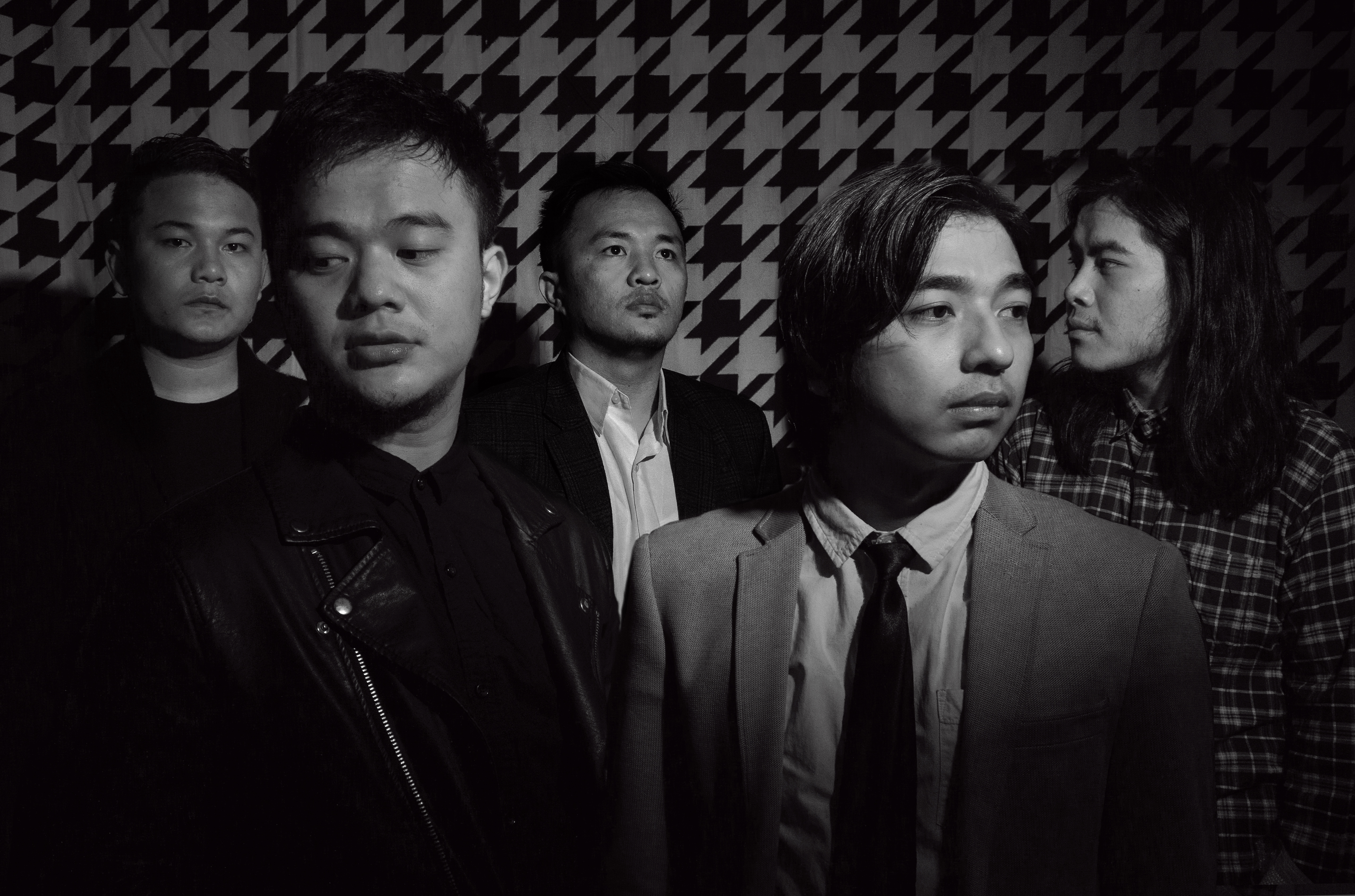
- Avora Records in 2020

Background information
- Also known as: AR
- Origin: Aizawl, Mizoram, India
- Genres: Rock; Grunge; Jazz; Punk rock; Math rock; Emo; Indie pop
- Years active: 2012–present
- Labels: K&P Records
- Members: Khos Hmar; Ruata Renthlei; Stephen Hnamte; Sanga Ralte; CK Hauzel
- Past members: Mamaa Ralte; Hriata Renthlei; Melvyn Fanai

Avora Records (abbreviated as AR) is an Indian indie rock band from Aizawl, Mizoram formed in 2012.

In 2018, the band released its debut singles Sunday & 23:00. In 2019, they released If You're Not Sweating To This Then Honey You're Not 90's and Waltz Of The Foolish Youth in 2020. The band's debut album, Comedians On Drugs was released on 1 October 2020.

They gained nationwide attention after winning Sennheiser Top 50 Season 3 and Hornbill International Rock Contest in 2017.

== Career ==
=== 2012–2016: History ===
The group was formed in 2012 by Khos (Lalkhawsiama), Mamaa Ralte (Vanlalmuanpuia) and Ruata in Aizawl, Mizoram. It was initially formed as a side-project to record songs and upload them on SoundCloud and YouTube. Avora Records gets its name from Mamaa's father Marova.

=== 2017–2018: Initial years as a band, touring, Sunday & 23:00 ===
The band's initial years have been touring and playing across India at various music competitions to open-air music festivals.

The band went on to do shows in Guwahati, Delhi, Aizawl, Hard Rock Cafe in Mumbai, NH7 Weekender in Meghalaya, Orange Festival

In 2018, the band toured across North-east India with multiple shows in Aizawl, Dimapur, Guwahati, Jowai and Shillong. They also performed at Hard Rock Cafe Mumbai, Ziro Festival of Arunachal Pradesh and Hornbill Festival of Nagaland. The same year, the band released their debut single Sunday and 23:00 - the first song they wrote together as a band in 2015. Rolling Stones India featured the music video of Sunday in their ‘10 Best Indian Music Videos of 2018’ article.

=== 2019–present: IYANSTTTHYN90's & Comedians On Drugs ===
The band went to perform at Udaipur World Music Festival in Udaipur, NH7 Weekender at Meghalaya, concerts in Assam, Delhi, Mizoram and Meghalaya. They released their third single If You're Not Sweating To This Then Honey You're Not 90's (abbreviated as 'IYANSTTTHYN90's') in August 2019 and their fourth single Waltz Of The Foolish Youth in May 2020 featuring Pangpari from Flowerpot. Their debut album, Comedians On Drugs was released on 1 October 2020,
