= Easy Wanderlings =

Indian soul-pop band

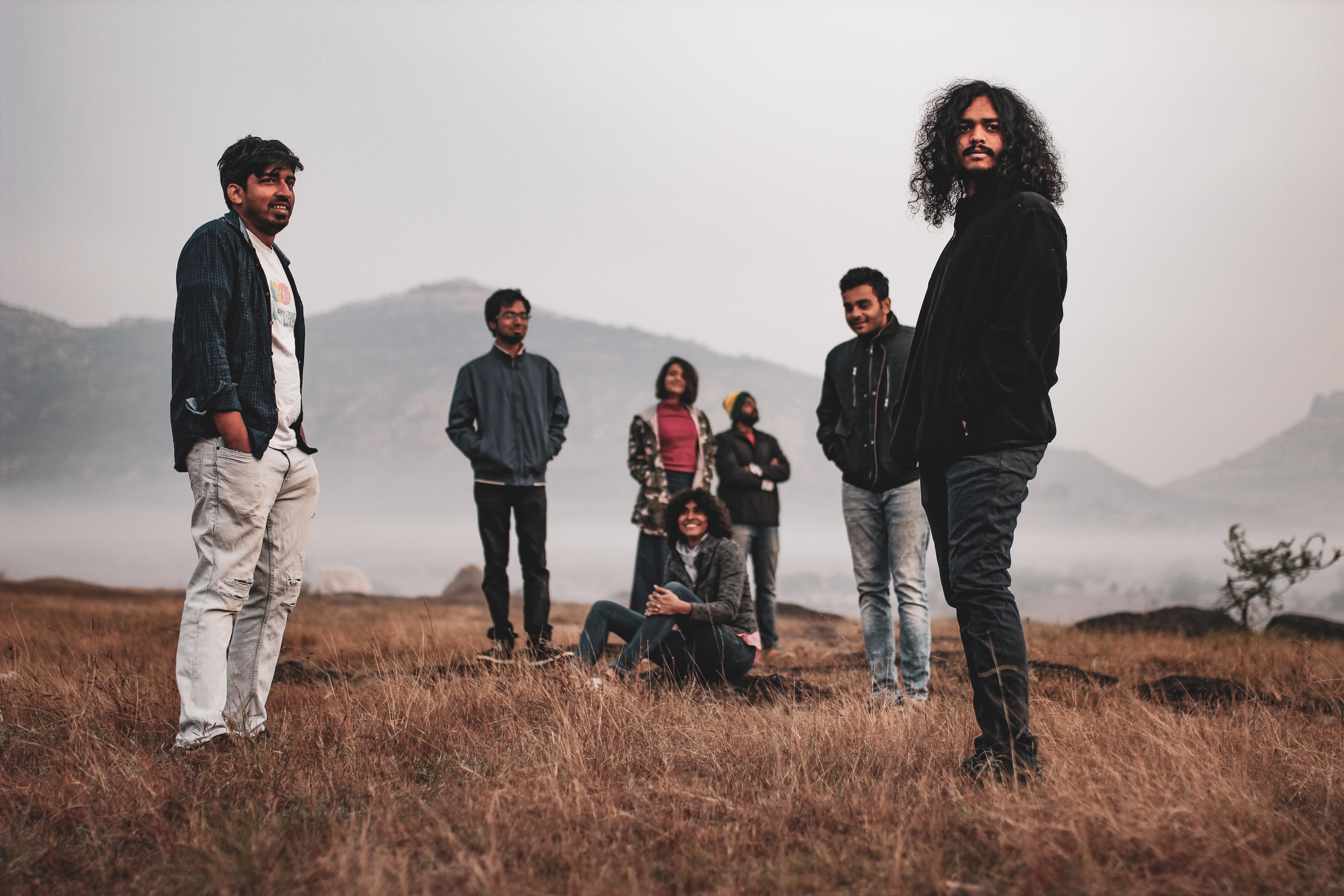
- Members of soul pop band Easy Wanderlings

Background information
- Origin: Pune, India
- Genres: Soul, Pop, Folk
- Years active: 2015-present
- Members: Sanyanth Naroth Malay Vadalkar Pratika Gopinath Nitin M. Krishna Sharad Rao Abraham Zachariah Shardul Bapat Siya Ragade
- Website: https://www.easywanderlings.com/

Easy Wanderlings is an independent band based in Pune, India, formed in 2015. The eight-member group, whose music displays ambient soul, pop and folk influences, has released one album and 2 EPs since its inception.

== Career ==
Easy Wanderlings produced their debut album "As Written in the Stars" through crowdfunding and released it in August 2017. The album contained eight tracks and featured various guest artists. Until the release, the core band members kept their individual identities hidden from public domain.

In September 2019, they launched a two-track concept EP titled "My Place to You."

Their latest Soul-Funk EP ' Caught in a Parade' released on 2022 was rated as the best Indian EP of 2022 by Rolling Stone Magazine. The single 'Enemy' centered around Cancel Culture, was featured on the popular Amazon Original film 'Gehraiyaan' starring Bollywood icon Deepika Padukone. They collaborated with Mumbai singer-songwriter Nikhil D’souza on the acoustic ballad ‘Mayflower’.

== Notable performances and recognition ==
Easy Wanderlings have been returning performers at annual multi-stage music festival NH7 Weekender in Pune, India, taking the stage for the first time in 2016 and again in 2017 and 2019. They also performed at music festival VH1 Supersonic 2018, which was headlined by many international artists, including Major Lazer, Marshmello, and Sean Paul.

The band was also invited and scheduled to perform at the SXSW Music Festival 2020 in Austin, Texas, USA. However, the event was canceled due to health concerns surrounding the Coronavirus pandemic.

In Jan 2023 Easy Wanderlings performed at the multi genre global music festival, Lollapalooza, in Mumbai.

Malay Vadalkar, band member and audio engineer, won the Indian Recording Arts Academy (IRAA) Award for Independent Song Recording for their song "Enjoy it While it Lasts" in 2018.

== Members ==
- Sanyanth Naroth - Composer, lyricist, rhythm guitar, lead vocals
- Malay Vadalkar - Bass guitar, backing vocals
- Pratika Gopinath - Lead vocals, percussion
- Nitin M. Krishna - Keyboard
- Sharad Rao - Guitar, lead vocals
- Shardul Bapat - Violin
- Siya Ragade - Flute
- Abraham Zachariah - Drums, percussion

== Discography ==
=== Albums ===
==== As Written in the Stars (2017) ====
Tracks:

1. Ode to a Bristlecone
2. Here's to You
3. Summer is Away
4. I for Little Things
5. Enjoy It While It Lasts
6. Dream to Keep Us Going
7. Faces
8. Going Easy

=== EPs ===
==== My Place to You (2019) ====
Tracks:

1. Beneath the Fireworks
2. Madeline

==== Caught in a Parade (2022) ====
Tracks:

1. Enemy
2. Center of the Universe
3. Mayflower
4. Castles in the Air
5. Makin' my Move
