= Zero (Indian band) =

Indian rock band

- Origin: Mumbai, India
- Genres: rock; pop; Bollywood music
- Years active: 1998–2008
- Labels: Counter Culture
- Members: Warren Mendonsa; Rajeev Talwar; Siddharth Coutto; Girish Talwar
- Website: Official website

Zero is an Indian rock band from Mumbai, launched in July 1998 with a performance at IIT Mumbai's rock festival Mood I. They released their first record, Albummed, in 2000, and followed it two years later with Hook. Their third, and most recent album, Procrastination, came out in 2005. The band's last official performance was on 30 August 2008, at Independence Rock XXIII Mumbai, but they still hold annual reunion performances, usually at the NH7 Weekender festival.

The name "Zero" comes from their drummer, Siddharth Coutto, doodling "I am zero" in his notebook during a boring college lecture.

== Band members ==
- Warren Mendonsa – guitars
- Rajeev Talwar – lead vocals
- Girish "Bobby" Talwar – bass, backing vocals
- Siddharth Coutto – drums, backing vocals

== Discography ==
- Albummed (2000)
- Hook (2002)
- Procrastination (2005)
