= Blackstratblues =

New Zealand musical project

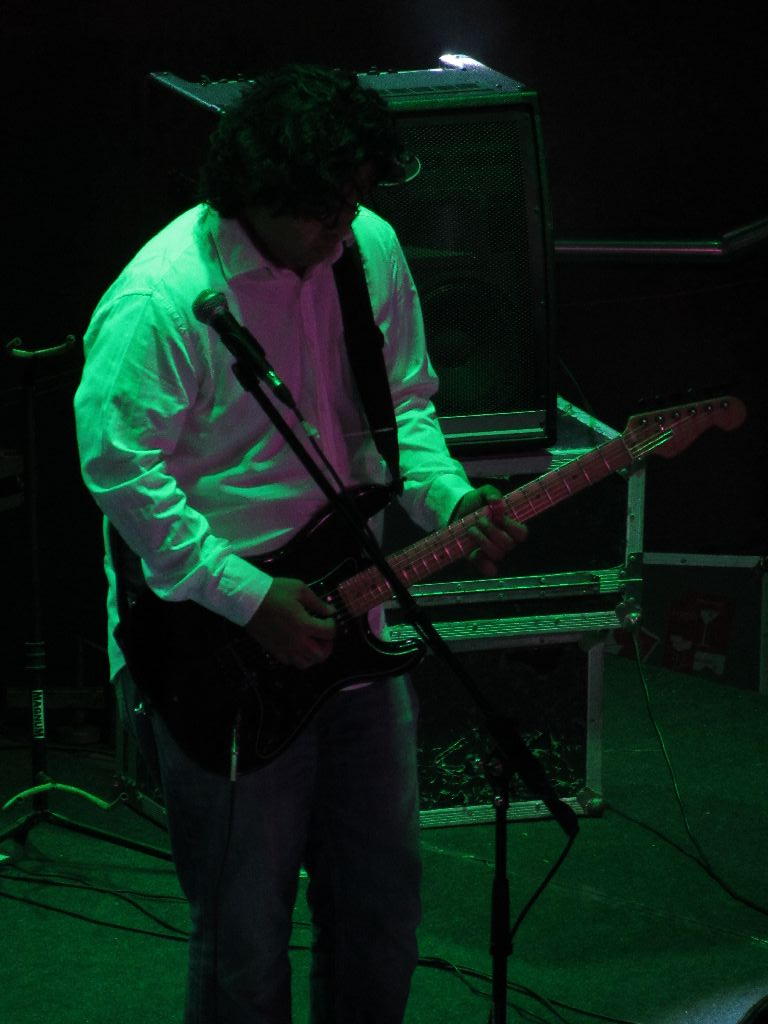
- Mendonsa performing in 2012

Background information
- Born: Warren Mendonsa; 12 September 1979 (age 46); Mumbai, India
- Origin: Auckland, New Zealand
- Genres: Blues; instrumental guitar; rock; rock and roll; pop rock
- Occupation: Musician
- Instruments: Guitar; bass; drum programming; keyboards; synthesizer
- Years active: 1998–present
- Label: Unsigned
- Member of: Zero
- Website: music.blackstratblues.com

Blackstratblues is a musical project of Warren Mendonsa, an Indian guitarist and composer based out of Auckland, New Zealand. Earlier Blackstratblues albums were solo efforts, and more recent releases have been group collaborations—all self-released by Mendonsa. The project has published six studio albums and two live albums as of 2026.

Mendonsa also plays lead guitar in the Indian rock band Zero. He is the nephew of Bollywood composer Loy Mendonsa of Shankar–Ehsaan–Loy fame.

== Career ==
In 1998, Mendonsa formed the rock band Zero, together with Rajeev Talwar, Sidd Coutto, and Girish Talwar, releasing three studio albums between 2000 and 2005.

In late 2004, Mendonsa moved to Auckland, New Zealand, thereby quitting Zero. He began releasing songs online as a solo artist, and in April 2007, he issued his debut album, Nights in Shining Karma, under the moniker Blackstratblues.

== Discography ==
Studio albums

- Nights in Shining Karma (2007)
- The New Album (2009)
- The Universe Has a Strange Sense of Humour (2015)
- The Last Analog Generation (2017)
- When It's Time (2019)
- Hindsight Is 2020 (2021)
- Artificial Integrity (2026)

Live albums

- L.I/O.V.E. Vol. I (2022)
- L.I/O.V.E. Vol. II (2023)
