= The Ska Vengers =

Indian rock band

- Origin: New Delhi, India
- Genres: Ska; rocksteady; dub; punk
- Years active: 2009–present
- Label: Times Music
- Members: Stefan K; Delhi Sultanate; Begum X; Nikhil Vasudevan; Tony Guinard; Chaitanya Bhalla
- Past members: Raghav Dang; Rie Ona; Yohei Sato

The Ska Vengers is an Indian, New Delhi–based band that blends ska, dub, punk, jazz, and rap in their music, along with various experimental styles. The group consists of Stefan "Flexi" K (keyboards, percussion, theremin, backing vocals), Delhi Sultanate (vocals), Begum X (vocals), "the Late" Nikhil Vasudevan (drums, backing vocals), Chaitanya "Chaz" Bhalla (guitars), and Tony Guinard (bass, backing vocals).

== History ==
=== Self-titled debut album ===
The Ska Vengers released their debut, self-titled album, in 2013, on Times Music. The first single, "Rough and Mean", explored the topic of misogyny in Indian society.

During the 2014 Indian general election, the band released "Modi, a Message to You", an animated music video adaption of the famous song "Rudy a Message to You", denouncing the candidate and current Prime Minister of India, Narendra Modi, and the issues surrounding his involvement in the 2002 Gujarat riots, as well as his right-wing inclinations. Subsequently, the band members received numerous death threats over this video.

In 2015, they released a music video for the song "Badda", this time only on their YouTube channel.

=== "Frank Brazil" ===
"Frank Brazil" is the first single from The Ska Vengers' second album, XX. Released on 31 July 2015, it marked the anniversary of the hanging of Udham Singh, whom the track is about. The video uses an animated narrative to tell the story of Singh, who travelled from India to the UK in 1940 to assassinate former Lieutenant Governor of Punjab, Michael O'Dwyer, seen by some as being responsible for the 1919 Jallianwala Bagh massacre.

=== Tihar Jail performance ===
The Ska Vengers performance at Tihar Jail, India's largest prison, in 2012 was widely covered in the international press. The objective of the show was to raise funds to donate instruments for the music room within the prison. The idea was formulated by Stefan Kaye, the band's keyboardist, who was jailed at Tihar for overstaying his visa in India.

=== XX ===
XX, pronounced "Double Cross", is the band's second album, released on 1 July 2016. It features nine songs, and apart from their usual ska and reggae sound, XX includes new influences, such as Latin music, on tracks like "El Cumbanchero", and also ventures into Afro-Cuban, jazz, and psychedelia, with songs like "Afro Fantasy".

=== UK/Europe Summer Tours, 2016–17 ===
Following the release of XX, the Ska Vengers went on an 18-show UK Summer Tour in 2016. Some of the shows included key slots at Boomtown Fair, Secret Garden Party, Wilderness Festival, London Mela, Bestival, Notting Hill Carnival, along with performances at key venues such as Dublin Castle in Camden, Hootenanny in Brixton, The Duke in Whitstable, and Curve Theatre in Leicester.

In 2017, the band was back with an extensive calendar of 38 shows, this time playing mainstage slots at festivals like Glastonbury Festival, WOMAD, Love Supreme Festival, Boomtown Fair, Wilderness Festival, Bestival, Camp Bestival, and Muziek In De Wilk.

In 2018, the Ska Vengers performed at the Gold Coast Commonwealth Games in Australia as part of the "Fresh Voices of the Commonwealth" concert series.

== Media coverage ==
The band's image was bolstered when they were interviewed by music journalist Alexis Petridis for a two-page feature in The Guardian. This was quickly followed by a primetime Channel 4 News feature hosted by Cathy Newman. The Ska Vengers also performed a twenty-minute set on WOMAD's Charlie Gillet Stage, hosted LIVE on BBC 6 Music, as well as BBC Radio 3 by Cerys Matthews and Lopa Kothari. They also performed live in studio on BBC Radio 4's Loose Ends show, hosted by Sara Cox, and later appeared on Bobby Friction's BBC Asian Network, as well Zee TV, London presented by Kanika Gupta.

== Band members ==
=== Current ===
- Delhi Sultanate – vocals
- Begum X – vocals
- "The Late" Nikhil Vasudevan – drums
- Tony "Bass" Guinard – bass
- Chaitanya "Chaz" Bhalla – guitars
- Stefan "Flexi" K – keyboards, percussion

=== Past ===
- Raghav "Diggy" Dang
- Rie Ona
- Yohei Sato

== Discography ==
Albums

- Ska Vengers (2013)
- XX (2016)

Singles

- "Frank Brazil" (2015)

== Awards and nominations ==
| Year | Category | Award | Result |
|---|---|---|---|
| 2012 | Best Keyboardist | Rolling Stone Rock Awards | Won |
| 2013 | Best Video for (Rough n Mean), Best Band | MTV Video Music Award | Nominated |
| 2013 | Best Debut, Best Pop Album, Best Single | Global Indian Music Academy Awards | Nominated |
| 2014 | Best Live Act | VH1 Sound Nation | Nominated |
| 2015 | Best India Act Category (World Wide Act) | MTV Europe Music Awards | Nominated |
