= Wild Palms (band) =

British four-piece alternative band

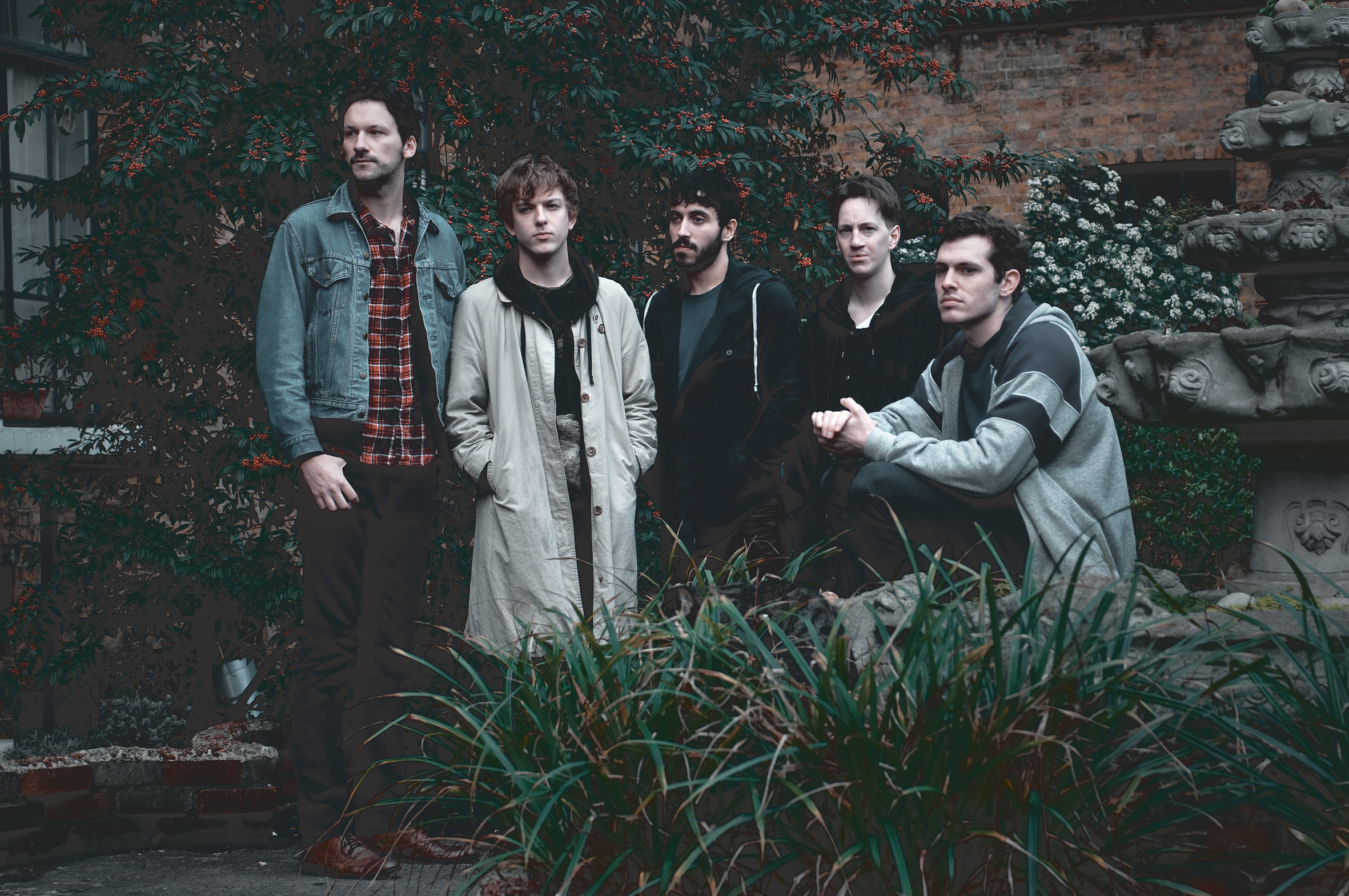

Background information
- Origin: London, England
- Genres: Post-punk revival: Alternative
- Years active: 2010–2017
- Labels: One Little Indian
- Members: Lou Hill; Darrell Hawkins; Gareth Jones; James Parish
- Website: www.wearewildpalms.com

Wild Palms was a British four-piece alternative band based in London, England, who were signed to One Little Indian Records in 2010. Formerly operating under the name Ex-Lion Tamers, the foursome saw their song "Helen's Exile" gain significant recognition just before the band rebranded itself as Wild Palms. In 2009 Wild Palms released their debut single "Over Time", followed by "Deep Dive" in 2010.

== Background ==
Vocalist Lou Hill met bassist Gareth Jones at school while he was performing alone as a garage MC. During the same period, the two also became friends with drummer James Parish and began listening to similar styles of music before finally meeting guitarist Darrell Hawkins. By 2007 all four founding members were acquainted. At this point the four band members were still pursuing different musical projects, but were slowly gravitating toward each other musically.

The quartet eventually came together in 2008, rehearsing and fashioning their style and sound, taking inspiration from other musicians such as Beefheart, Can, and the Fall. Burial, Radiohead, Sigur Rós, Sonic Youth, Talking Heads, and TV on the Radio are also considered influences by the band. They began playing live shows together under the name Ex-Lion Tamers; their sound during this period was described as having "angular twang and a youthful snarl". Once their music established a foothold, the band retired their original moniker and re-emerged as Wild Palms.

== Wild Palms ==
A degree of change in the band's sound accompanied the change of name. Their post-Ex-Lion Tamers style has been described as "art rock", "indie-rock" and "post-punk". They set up their own rehearsal space in North London, in order to allow themselves to rehearse regularly and experiment with sounds, styles, and ideas, and develop what Clash called "a distinct songwriting voice." A review of one of their performances from this time period called it "energetic" and indicative of "a band really getting into their stride." Wild Palms recorded three singles, working with producer Gareth Jones: "Over Time", described as having "heavy angular guitar stabs"; "To The Lighthouse"; and "Deep Dive", described as having a pleasingly "thick, heavy sound".

=== Until Spring ===
Wild Palms began work on their debut album in 2010, after signing with One Little Indian Records on a three-record deal. The "run-down" space in which recording for Until Spring took place was considered a plus by the band; singer Hill called it "a major influence on the record". The band rigged microphones to Biffa bins as well as a water tank to create unique sounds while recording the album. There was a deliberate effort to create a different sound for the album than the band was known for from live shows, and to get away from the post-punk label. The band was also motivated by a desire to create "a continuous piece of work, rather than a collection of songs". They again worked with producer Gareth Jones on the album, which was released on 7th March 2011.

James Aparicio was Until Spring's sound engineer. Graphic design and art direction for the album were the work of Aneel Kalsi, using photographs taken by Ben Westoby.

Clash magazine said in its review that "Until Spring is a romantically epic album, lovingly pieced together by a compelling band." Parts of the album were characterised as "murky, overcast and at times tedious" by Loud and Quiet's review. A review by musicOMH referred to lead singer "Hill's voice [a]s a continual point of interest" but also said the album "suffers from falling short in execution of [its] idea[s]."

The single "Delight in Temptation" was released just after the album on 14 March 2011. Fans were invited to remix the track, which Clash described as "[a]n ode to humanity's carnal nature", musicOMH called "really quite pretty at times", and Stereoboard characterised as "anthemic".

=== Touring ===
In 2010, Wild Palms toured the UK and also performed at several festivals, including Camden Crawl, Great Escape, and Standon Calling The band opened for the American indie rock group Cold War Kids during the latter's tour in 2011, in between recording Until Spring. They then embarked on their own tour to promote the album after its release, at venues both in the UK and elsewhere in Europe, playing songs from Until Spring as well as unreleased songs.

== Band members ==
- Lou Hill – vocals, keyboards and pads
- Darrell Hawkins – guitar
- Gareth Jones – bass
- James Parish – drums
- Bobby Krilic – guitar, multiple instruments

== Discography ==
=== Singles ===
- "Over Time" / "Popular Recordings" (2010)
- "To The Lighthouse" / "Draw In Light" (2010)
- "Deep Dive" (2010)
- "Delight In Temptation" (2011)

=== EPs ===
- Draw In Light EP – Eurostar Records (2010)

=== Albums ===
- Until Spring (2011)
- Live Together, Eat Each Other (2016)
