= The Globe Cardiff =

Coordinates: 51.494202°N 3.16503°W

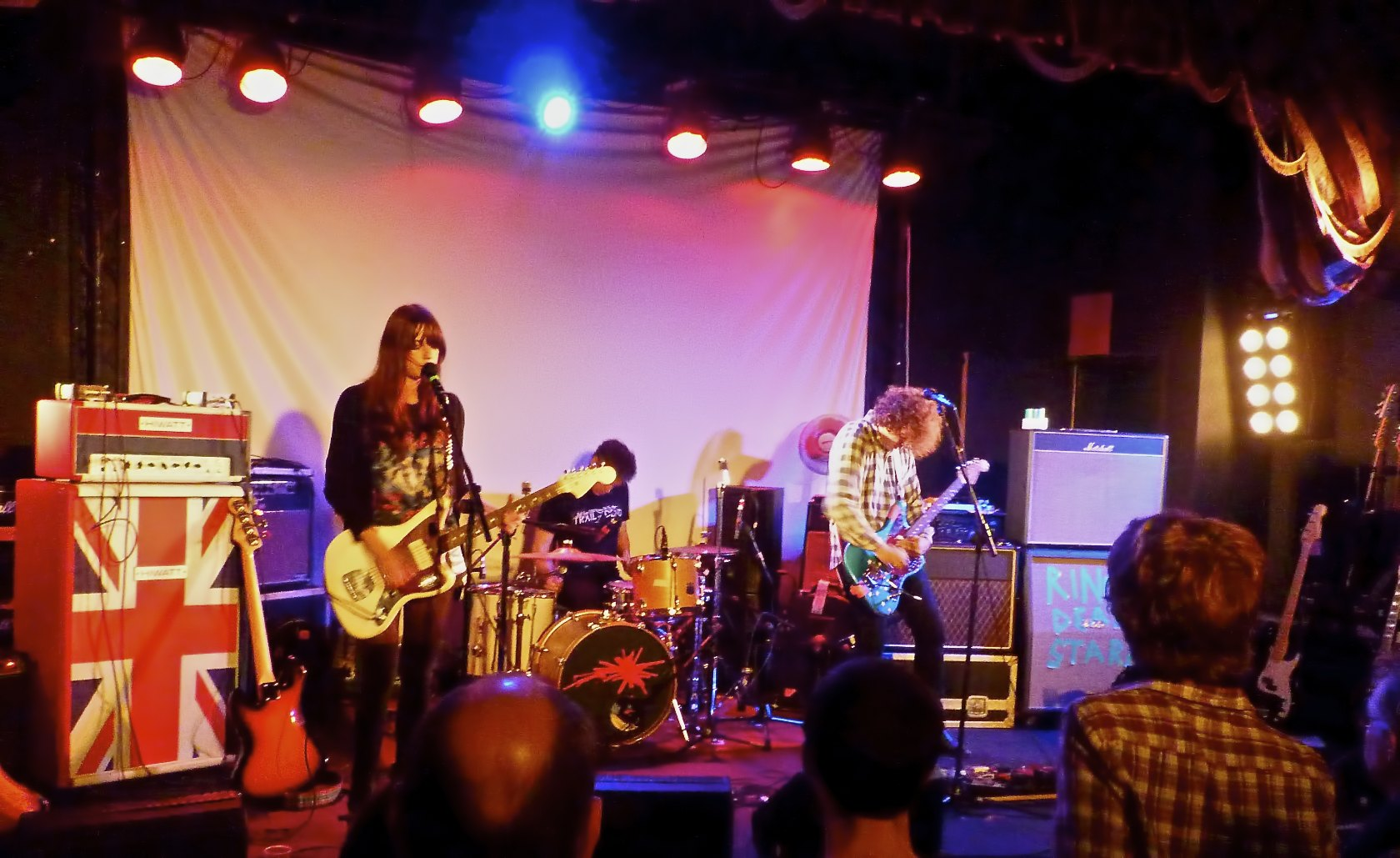
The band Ringo Deathstarr performing at The Globe in 2010

The Globe Cardiff is a music venue in Roath, Cardiff, Wales.

It is a converted cinema.
