= List of Punjabi films of 2015 =

This is a list of Punjabi films of 2015.

== List of films ==
Title	Director	Cast	Genre	Release date	Producer	Ref.
Eh Janam Tumhare Lekhe	Harjit Singh	Pavan Malhotra, Arjuna Bhalla, Avrinder Kaur, Master Yuvraj & Sudhanshu Aggarwal	Biopic	30 January 2015	All India Pingalwara Charitable Society (regd.) Amritsar	
Qissa	Anup Singh	Irrfan Khan, Tisca Chopra	Drama	20 February 2015	NFDC India, Heimatfilm, Augustus Film, Cine-sud Promotion, PVR Director’s Rare	
Honour Killing	Avtar Bhogal	Zara Sheikh, Sandeep Singh, Tom Alter	Drama	27 February 2015		
Kudesan	Jeet Matharu	Sukhbir Singh, Pakhi Hegde, Nirmal Rishi, Satwant Bal, Jeet Matharu, Jigar Gill, Pardeep Sandhu	Drama	6 March 2015	24 Seven	
What the Jatt!!	Saket Behl	Harish Verma, Binnu Dhillon, Vipul Roy, Swati Kapoor, Isha Rikhi, BN Sharma	Adventure, comedy	13 March 2015	United Vibes International Filmz	
Punjabian Da King	Manduip Singh	Navraj Hans, Keeya Khanna, Bhanushree Mehra, Jarnail Singh, Shivendra Mahal, Bottu Shah, Hobby Dhaliwai, Bunny	Action	27 March 2015	Manduip Singh, Dashmesh Movies	
Gun & Goal	Simranjit Singh Hundal	Sumeet Singh Sarao, Rishita Monga, Mukesh Tiwari, Sezal Sharma, Sandeepa virk, Razia Sukhbir, Guggu Gill, Sardar Sohi	Action	3 April 2015	Surinderjeet Singh Sarao, Sarao Films	
Leather Life	Sukhbir Singh	Om Puri, Aman Dhaliwal, Himanshi Khurana, Deep Brar, Ericka Virk, Karamjit Anmol, Harinder Bhullar, Simran Sehjpal, Tarlochan Singh	Action, crime, drama	10 April 2015	Positive Sandhu Films	
Bol Mere Kukda Kukdu Ghadoon	Rajinder Singh Atish	Rittu Sharma, Ritesh, Richa Koundel, Ekta Sodhi, Labh Singh, Poonam Labana, Harbans Gautam, Nayna Khedkar	Comedy	17 April 2015	Gopal Sehgal Fan Klub	
Nanak Shah Fakir	Sartaj Singh Pannu	Arif Zakaria, Puneet Sikka, Shraddha Kaul, Anurag Arora, Adil Hussain, Narendra Jha	Biography, devotional, drama	17 April 2015	Gurbani Media	
Mere Haaniya	Pankaj Batra, Dheeraj Rattan	Ravikiran Khangura, Arshjot Kaur, Barun Sobti, Yograj Singh, Guggu Gill, Kirron Kher, Shavinder Mahal, Dolly Minhas, Jaswinder Bhalla, Karamjit Anmol, Emma Watson	Romance, Drama	17 April 2015	Eros International, Zee Studios	
Patta Patta Singhan Da Vairi: When Everything Is Against You	Naresh s Garg	Raj Kakra, Jonita Doda, Shavendra Mahal	Action, drama	17 April 2015	Sound Boom Entertainment	
Yaarana	Ranbir Pushp	Gavie Chahal, Geeta Zaildar, Yuvraj Hans, Yuvika Chaudhary, Kashish Singh, Rupali Sood, Dolly Minhas Yashpal Sharma, Puneet Issar	Drama	24 April 2015	Sukhbir Sandhar Ranjana Kent	
The Blood Street	Darshan Darvesh	Gurjant jatana, Sukhdev Barnala, Sardar Sohi, Mahanbir Bhullar, Harjit Bhullar, Sonpreet Jawanda, Binni Singh, Parminder Gill	Action, drama	1 May 2015	Har Jee Movies International	
Mitti Na Pharol Jogiya	Avtar Singh	Kartar Cheema, Aman Grewal, Japtej Singh	Drama	8 May 2015	Ram Avtar Art Films	
Singh of Festival	Gurdev Rehman	Roshan Prince, Mahie Gill	Devotional	15 May		
Oh Yaara Ainvayi Ainvayi Lut Gaya	Raj Sinha	Gauahar Khan, Jassi Gill, B N Sharma, Rana Ranbir, Karamjit Anmol	Drama, romance	22 May 2015	Father & Son Films	
Gaddar : The Traitor	Amitoj Maan	Harbhajan Mann, Manpneet Grewal, Ashish Duggal	Suspense thriller	29 May 2015	Saga Music & Grandson Films	
Chooriyan	Sukhwant Dhadda	Vinod Khanna, Gracy Singh, Sudhanshu Pandde, Parikshat Sahni, Pankaj Dheer, Vikas Bhalla, Jonita Doda	Action, romance	19 June 2015	The Big Picture Co.	
Villaitan Jatti	Sukhpal Sidhu	Kulvinder Singh Kuki, Harpreet Nahal, Sukhpal Sidhu, Nim Aulakh Foggia Khan, Dalgeet Matu, Prakash Gadhu, Amrit Billa, Madam Satinder Kaur, Pali Mangt, Gurwindar Saran (Mini Mittal)		19 June 2015	R. N. Films	
Sardaar Ji	Rohit Jugraj	Diljit Dosanjh, Neeru Bajwa, Mandy Takhar, Jaswinder Bhalla	Comedy, romance, fantasy	26 June 2015	White Hill Studios, Dalmora Entertainment, Gunbir Singh Sidhu, Manmord Sidhu	
Hero Naam Yaad Rakhi	Baljit Singh Deo	Jimmy Shergill, Surveen Chawla, Mukul Dev, Shavendra Mahal, Jaggi Singh	Action, romance, suspense	10 July 2015	Shri Narotam Films Production	
Lovely Te Lovely	A.S. Ravi Kumar, Mir	Gurjit Singh, Pooja Thakur, Hardeep Gill, Sonika Chauhan, Pamma Singh	Comedy, drama	24 July 2015	SRK Creative Media	
Angrej	Simerjit Singh	Amrinder Gill, Binnu Dhillon, Ammy Virk, Aditi Sharma, Sardar Sohi, Parminder Gill	Comedy, romance	31 July 2015	Dara Productions and J Studio	
Ramta Jogi	Guddu Dhanoa	Deep Sidhu, Ronica Singh, Rahul Dev, Greesh Sehdev, Zafar Dhillon, Anil Grover	Romantic thriller	14 August 2014	Vijayta Films	
Munde Kamaal De	Amit Prasher	Amrinder Gill, Yuvraj Hans, Binnu Dhillon, Inderpreet Ghag, Mandy Takhar, Jaswinder Bhalla, B.N. Sharma, Karamjit Anmol, Nisha Gulati, Prabhjeet Kaur	Comedy	21 August 2015	Prem Motion Pictures	
Faraar	Baljit Singh Deo	Gippy Grewal, Kainaat Arora	Action	28 August 2015	Sippy Grewal Production	
Bhid Ja	Gautam Narwat	Baljinder Singh Darapuri, Bashir Khan, Michael, Himanshu Sharma, Vicky Baba, Rana, Harpinder Rajput, Lucky Sangre, Sukhdeep Singh, Harvinder Aujla, Jarnail Makhan, Rimple Dhindsa and Gautam Narwat	Sports	4 September 2015	GW Films	
Myself Pendu	Surinder Rehal	Preet Harpal, Sayali Bhagat, Satinder Satti, Ather Habib, Jaswinder Bhalla, Upasana Singh	Romantic comedy	4 September 2015	Music Media Box	
Rupinder Gandhi The Gangster?	Tarn Mann	Dev Kharoud, Kul Sidhu, Navdeep Kaler, Karamjit Brar, Dheeraj Kumar, Jagjeet Sandhu, Lucky Dhaliwal, Bunty Dhillon, Lally Pandher, Sanjeev Rai, Diksha Dhyani, Tarn Mann, Rupinder Rupi	Drama	11 September 2015	Dream Reality Movies	
The Mastermind - Jinda Sukha	Sukhjinder Singh	Nav Bajwa, Sonpreet Jawandha, Guggu Gill, Sukhjinder Shera, Harinder Bubb, Isha Sharma, Sunita Dhir, Davvy Singh, Amritpal Singh (Billa), Satwant Kaur & Jaggi Dhuri	Historical	11 September 2015 (overseas market; banned in India)	Singh Brothers Production	
Jugaadi Dot Com	Anil Vij	Nachhatar Gill, Feroz Khan, Sarb Chawla, Rana Ranbir, Mansi Sharma, Komya Virk, Megha Sharma, Ghulle Shah	Comedy	25 September 2015	Show Start Productions	
Kaun Kare Insaaf	Baljit Singh	Varsha Chaudhary, Lakhvinder Singh Lakkha, Raj Dhaliwal, Parminder Gill	Drama	25 September 2015	Satluj Films	
Dildariyaan	Pankaj Batra	Jassi Gill, Sagarika Ghatge, Guggu Gill, Binnu Dhillon, Karamjit Anmol	Romance	9 October 2015	Battalion Entertainment & Yuvika Films	
Beeba Boys	Deepa Mehta	Randeep Hooda, Sarah Allen, Gulshan Grover, Waris Ahluwalia, Ali Momen, Steve Dhillon, Gabe Grey, Ali Kazmi, Jag Bal	Crime drama	16 October 2015 (CANADA only)	David Hamilton	
Qissa Panjab	Jatinder Mauhar	Preet Bhullar, Kul Sidhu, Dheeraj Kumar, Jagjit Sandhu, Aman Dhaliwal, Harshjot Kaur	Action	16 October 2015	Pukhraj Production House Pvt Ltd	
Shareek	Navaniat Singh	Jimmy Shergill, Mahie Gill, Simar Gill, Oshin Brar, Guggu Gill, Mukul Dev, Kuljinder Sidhu	Family drama	22 October 2015	Ohri Productions, Green Planet Production	
Sikka	Jeet Matharu	Mukesh Rishi, Jaswant Singh Rathore, Kunal Sharma	Horror	30 October 2015	24 Seven	
Mukhtiar Chadha	Director Gifty	Diljit Dosanjh, Oshin Brar-Sai, Yashpal Sharma	Romantic comedy	27 November 2015	Eros International	
Nanak Naam Jahaz Hai (1969 Re-release)		Prithviraaj Kapoor, I S Johar, Nishi	Social	27 November 2015	Wave Industries Pvt Ltd	
Judge Singh LLB	Atharv Baluja	Ravinder Grewal, B N Sharma, Chandan Prabhakar, Sardar Sohi, Harpal Singh, Surbhi Mahendru, Prajesh Kapil, Anita Devgn, Hardeep Gill, Vandana Singh	Comedy	4 December 2015	Unisys Infosolutions	
22g Tussi Ghaint Ho	Vishal Parasher	Tej Sapru, Pooja Verma, Upasana Singh, Rupan Bal, Jus Reign, Bhagwant Mann	Drama	11 December 2015	Dec Productions	
Nagara	Harpal Singh	Simar khaira, Narinder Singh Neena, Amritpal Singh Billa Bhaji, Anita Meet, Manmeet Singh, Kamal Virk	Historical, Religious, Promot Sikhism	27 May 2015	Shan-e-khalsa productions	
