= Surmeet Maavi =

Indian actor

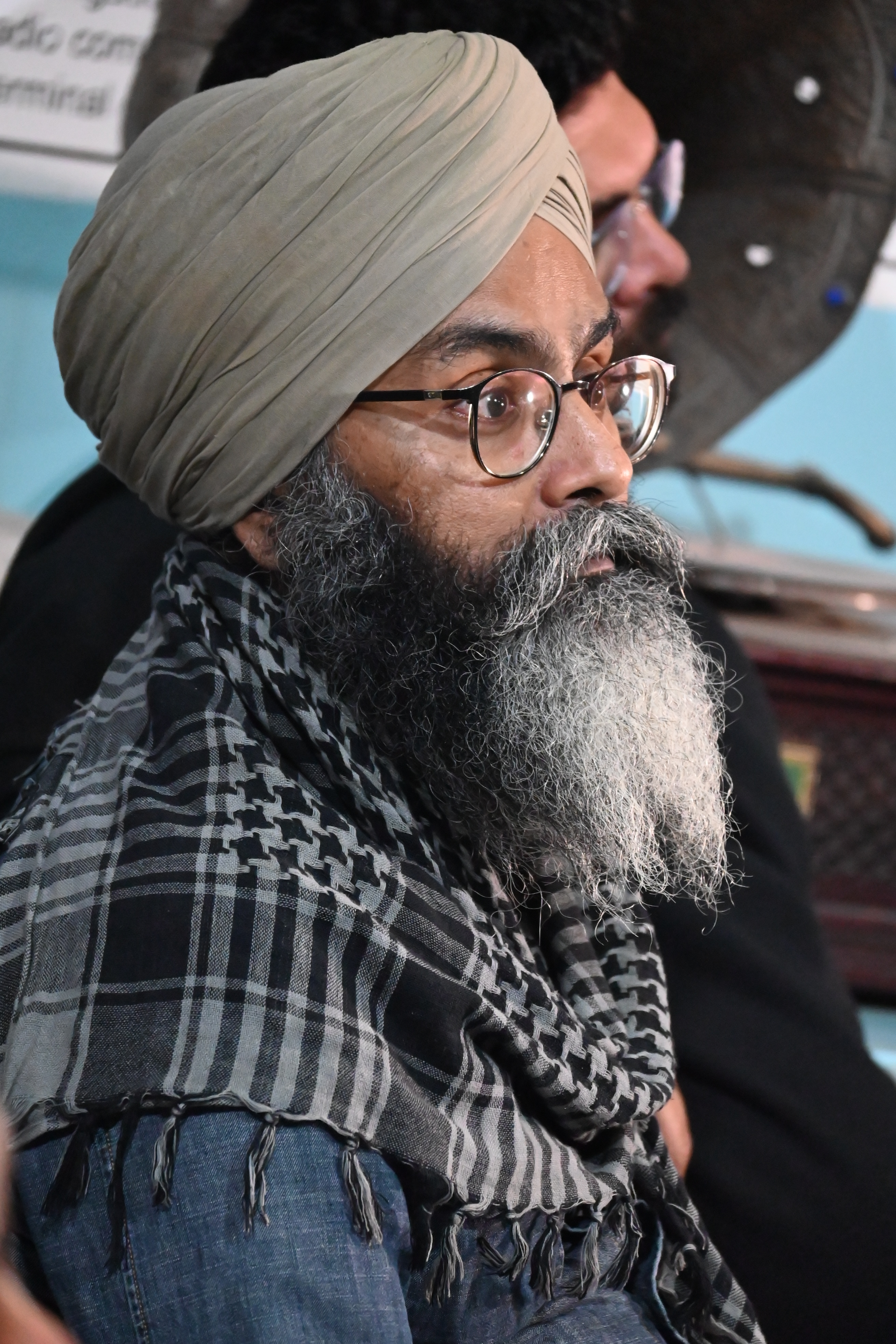
- Surmeet Mavi
- Born: 28 March 1974 (age 51); Ropar, Punjab, India
- Occupations: Screenwriter; actor; poet
- Years active: 2001–present
- Children: 2

Surmeet Maavi (born 28 March 1974) is an Indian screenwriter and actor who has scripted many films including Punjab 1984 and Gun & Goal.

== Early life ==
Born to a Punjabi Jatt family in Ropar, Punjab, Surmeet Maavi travelled a lot with his family during his school education. His fascination for advertising prompted him to pursue a master's degree in mass communication from Punjabi University, Patiala. After graduating, he worked for a newspaper printed in Chandigarh; he later realized that he was not meant for journalism. So he left the job and headed to Mumbai. There in congregation of Barry Dhillon, he learned to write for TV; he wrote story and dialogue for serials like Lakeeran, Daane Anaar De and Dupatta, among others. Then he wrote a screenplay for a Hindi serial Kahin To Milegi. Meanwhile, he worked for channels like Balle Balle, ATN MH1 and Channel Punjabi. He worked as a writer for 4–5 years at ATN MH1. After a journey of 15 years, he was hired to write dialogue for the movie Punjab 1984.

== Career ==
When Surmeet Maavi moved to Mumbai in 1999, he worked as an assistant director for the TV serials Partapi and Kaun Dilan Diyan Jane, both aired on Alpha Punjabi. He was also the chief assistant director for Kamyabi Zindagi Ki, aired on Doordarshan, and an associate director for Daane Anaar De, aired on Zee Punjabi.

His first project was the TV show Lakeeran for ATN Alpha ETC Punjabi, for which he wrote the story, screenplay and dialogues. For Kahin Toh Milenge, which aired on Sahara One, he wrote the dialogues. He also wrote some episodes of reality TV shows Awaaz Punjab Di, The Great Punjabi Comedy Show and Comedy Ka Maha Muqabala, and translated scripts into Punjabi for Big CBS Spark, History TV18 and Discovery Science.

Year	Title	Language	Credit	Notes
2013	Heer and Hero	Punjabi	Actor	
2014	Punjab 1984	Punjabi	Writer	
2015	Gun & Goal	Punjabi	Writer	
2015	Baaz	Punjabi	Dialogue Writer and Actor	
2015	Ramta Jogi	Punjabi	Dialogue Writer	
2015	Buniyaad	Punjabi	Dialogue Writer	
2015	Shareek	Punjabi	Dialogue Writer	
2015	Sardaar Ji	Punjabi	Additional Dialogue Writer	
2015	Mitti Na Pharol Jogiya	Punjabi	Actor	
2016	Ambarsariya	Punjabi	Additional Dialogue Writer	
2016	Saadey CM Saab	Punjabi	Dialogue Writer	
2016	Kaptaan	Punjabi	Dialogue Writer	
2016	Mmirsa	Hindi	Screenplay and Dialogue Writer	Post-production (Delayed)
2016	Tiger	Punjabi	Dialogue Writer	
2016	25 Kille	Punjabi	Screenplay and Dialogue Writer	
2016	Sardaar Ji 2	Punjabi	Additional Dialogue Writer	
2017	Toofan Singh	Punjabi	Dialogue Writer	
2018	Khido Khundi	Punjabi	Dialogue Writer	
2018	Nankana	Punjabi	Screenplay and Dialogue Writer	
2018	Golak Bugni Bank te Batua	Punjabi	Additional Dialogue Writer	
2018	Banjara the truck driver	Punjabi	Dialogue Writer	
2018	Son of Manjit Singh	Punjabi	Dialogue Writer	
2018	Laatu	Punjabi	Dialogue Writer	
2019	Uda Aida	Punjabi	Screenplay and Dialogue Writer	
2019	15 Lakh Kado Aauga	Punjabi	Writer	
2019	Kesari	Hindi	Special Thanks	
2019	Munda Hi Chahida	Punjabi	Special Thanks	
