= List of Punjabi films of 2016 =

This is a list of Punjabi films of 2016.

== List of films ==
Title	Director	Cast	Genre	Release date	Producer	Ref.
Channo Kamli Yaar Di	Pankaj Batra	Neeru Bajwa	Drama	19 February 2016	Neeru Bajwa Entertainment & Mystery Man Productions	
Ek Mahan Sant Te Kugh Khadku Sipahi	B. Krishna Bala	Manny Johal, Chendeni Deshai, Sukhwant Daddha	Drama	26 February 2016	White Cloud Movies	
Wake Up Singh	Gagandeep Singh	Manmeet Singh, Gagandeep Singh, Simpi Singh, Vikram Kumar, Megha Sharma, Vicky Survinder, Amrit Nandraa, Amrit Pal Singh Billa, Daman Preet Kaur, Sherry, Sehaj, Gaurav Maker, Lavi Singh, Nagendar Ghakker, Renu Mohali, Chander Kalra	Drama	26 February 2016	Iknoor Films and Sunmeet Kaur (kbc winner 6)	
Born To Be King	Satyajeet Puri	Ateesh Randev, Sonam Bajwa, Ranjeet, Puneet Issar, Deanna Uppal	Crime	4 March 2016	Ask Movies	
Ardaas	Gippy Grewal	Ammy Virk, Gurpreet Ghuggi, Mandy Takhar, Isha Rikhi, Karamjit Anmol, Parminder Gill	Religious	11 March 2016	Humble Motion Pictures	
Love Punjab	Rajiv Dhingra	Amrinder Gill, Sargun Mehta, Binnu Dhillon, Manvir Johal, Yograj Singh, Rana Ranbir, Nirmal Rishi	Drama/comedy	11 March 2016	Rhythm Boyz Entertainment, Dara Productions and J Studio	
Ambarsariya	Mandeep Kumar	Diljit Dosanjh, Navneet Kaur Dhillon, Monica Gill, Lauren Gautlieb	Drama, Action, Comedy	25 March 2016	Tips Industries Limited	
Canada Di Flight	Rupesh Rai	Yuvraj Hans, Navraj Hans, Rana Ranbir, Shobhita Rana, Akruti, Abushka Minto, Sanjiv Attri & Ajay Verma	Romantic comedy	1 April 2016	Maxwell (Vip Franchise)	
Bathinda Express	KJ	Vijay S. Kumar, Jasmine Kau, Tarlochan Singh, Deep Joshi	Social	8 April 2016	Heartbeat Films	
Saka - Nankana Sahib De Shaheed	Jagmeet Singh Samundri	Mukul Dev, Aman Dhaliwal, Oshin Brar, Dev Kharoud, Hardeep Gill, Gurinder Makna, Mahanbir Bhullar, Bego Kaur, Bhavnoor Singh, Raj Bir Suryavanshi, Pali Sandhu, Stass Klassen, Kristen	Action	8 April 2016	Sikhbir Sandhar Films Pvt. Ltd.	
Vaisakhi List	Smeep Kang	Jimmy Shergill, Shruti Sodhi, Sunil Grover, Gurpreet Ghuggi, Jaswinder Bhalla, Karamjit Anmol, Abhiroy Singh Cheema	Action, Drama, Comedy, Romance	22 April 2016	Amolak Singh Gakhal, Gakhal Bros. Ent.	
Zorawar	Vinnil Markan	Yo Yo Honey Singh, Inderpreet Ghag, Gurbani Judge, Achint Kaur, Pawan Malhotra, Mukul Dev, Amit Behl, Parul Gulati	Action/romance	6 May 2016	PTC Motion Pictures	
2 Bol	Sahib Singh	Sonpreet Jawanda, Harvinder Singh, Himanshi Khurana, Isha Shama, Ginda Randhawa, Sanju Solanki, Gurinder Makna, Manjit Singh, Sunny Gill, Suvinder Vicky, Mandeep Mani, Raaj, Gurjit Singh	Drama	13 May 2016 (only the US and Canada)	Blackstone Media, Shamsheer Production	
Killer Punjabi	Lakhvir Bansi	Gulshan Grover, Pooja Batra, Balinder Johal, Kailey Rav	Action	13 May 2016	Rav Productions Ltd.	
Kaptaan	Mandeep Kumar	Gippy Grewal, Karishma Kotak, Monica Gill	Drama	20 May 2016	TIPS	
Saadey CM Saab	Vipin Parashar	Harbhajan Mann, Kashish Singh, Gurpreet Ghuggi, Dev Singh Gill, Rahul Singh and Inder Bajwa	Political drama	27 May 2016	Saga Music, Grandson Films	
Vaapsi	Rakesh Mehta	Harish Verma, Gulshan Grover, Ashish Duggal, Samiksha, Dhriti Saharan, Lakhwinder Shabla, Mandeep Kaur	Drama	3 June 2016	Miraj Ventures, Speed Records	
Once Upon A Time In Amritsar	Harjit Singh Ricky	Dilpreet Dhillon, Gurjind Maan, Tanvi Nagi, Sonia Kaur, Pavan Malhotra, B N Sharma, Shavinder Mahal, Arun Bali, Dolly Minhas, Prince Kanwaljeet Singh, Ashish Duggal, Shweta, Roopi	Action	10 June 2016	Cine Vision Films, Banwait Films	
Dulla Bhatti	Minar Malhotra	Binnu Dhillon, Sardar Sohi, B N Sharma, Aman Hundal, Amar Noorie, Dev Kharoud, Nirmal Rishi, Malkit Rauni	Drama	10 June 2016	Dara Films Entertainment	
Sardaarji 2	Rohit Jugraj	Diljit Dosanjh, Monica Gill, Sonam Bajwa, Jaswinder Bhalla	Rom-com fantasy	24 June 2016	White Hill Productions	
Highway 5	Kavi Raj	Aman Dhaliwal, Sunny Boparai, Baaz Lalia, Raj Sandhu, Jasmine Kaur, Pramod Kumar, Kavi Raj, Mannu Sandhu	Comedy/drama	22 July 2016	Fateh Entertainment	
Needhi Singh	Jaivi Dhanda	Kulraj Randhawa	Drama/thriller	22 July 2016	Golden Fox Film	
Bambukat	Pankaj Batra	Ammy Virk, Binnu Dhillon, Sardar Sohi	Drama	29 July 2016	Nadar Films, Rhythm Boyz Entertainment	
Chauthi Koot	Gurvinder Singh	Suvinder Pal Vicky, Rajbir Kaur, Kanwaljit Singh, Gurpreet Bhangu, Tommy, Harnek Aulakh	Drama/history	5 August 2016	The Film Cafe Entertainment Pvt. Ltd.	
Gelo	Manbhavan Singh	Jaspinder Cheema, Pavan Malhotra, Gurjit Singh, Dilavar Sidhu	Drama	5 August 2016	Sonark Solutions INC	
Main Teri Tu Mera	Ksshitj Chaudhary	Roshan Prince, Yamini Malhotra, Mankirat Aulakh, Harinder Bhullar, Jassi Kaur, Karamjit Anmol, Malkit Rauni, Dilabar Sidhu, Parminder Gill	Romance	19 August 2016	Roshni Films International	
25 Kille	Simranjit Singh Hundal	Guggu Gill, Yograj Singh, Vikram Singh, Sonia Mann, Jimmy Sharma, Sardar Sohi, Sapna Bassi, Sandeepa Malli	Action/comedy	25 August 2016	Running Horses Films, Color 9 Productions	
Darra	Parveen Kumar	Gurpreet Ghuggi, Kartar Cheema, Happy Raikoti, Sardar Sohi, Shavinder Mahal, Nirmal Rishi	Drama	2 September 2016	Artha Film Studios	
Tiger	Sartaj Singh Pannu	Sippy Gill, Ihana Dhillon, Yograj Singh, Yashpal Sharma	Action	9 September 2016	Blue Motion Pictures, Nanda & Associate Visa Experts	
Dharam Yudh Morcha	Naresh S Garg	Raj Kakra, Nitu Pandher, Shakku Rana, Karamjit Singh, Amritpal Singh	History	16 September 2016 (overseas only)		
Singh Dot Com Nashon Ke Khilaaf Ek Jung	Babbal Chopra	Anchal Bansal, Ginda Aujla, Pamma Rihal	Action	16 September 2016	Ladal Entertainment Films	
Teshan	Sukhbir Singh	Happy Raikoti, Diljott, Yograj Singh, Shivinder Mahal, Karmjit Anmol, Prince KJ Singh, Anita Devgan, Virasat Sandhu, Minto, Nisha Bano	Comedy/romance	23 September 2016	Rahul Productions Pvt. Ltd.	
Nikka Zaildar	Simerjit Singh	Ammy Virk, Sonam Bajwa, Parminder Gill, Karamjit Anmol, Nirmal Rishi, Nisha Bano and others	Comedy/romance	30 September 2016	Patiala Motion Pictures	
Aatishbazi Ishq	Amit Dhawan	Mahie Gill, Roshan Prince, Kulbhushan Kharbanda, B. N. Sharma, Tanya Abrol	Drama	14 October 2016	Globe Moviez	
Lock	Smeep Kang	Gippy Grewal, Smeep Kang, Geeta Basra, Gurpreet Ghuggi, Karamjit Anmol	Thriller	14 October 2016	Ekrehmat Productions	
Desi Munde	Inderjit Bansel	Balkar Sidhu, Bunty Grewal, Harmeet Kaur, Pareekshit Sahni, Daljit Kaur, Sonpreet Jawanda, APS Mann, Upinder Randhawa, Supan Sandhu, Isha Rikhi, Raza Murad	Action/Drama	21 October 2016	Purewal Films International	
Lakeeran	Bhupinder Sayan	Harman Virk, Yuvika Chaudhary	Drama	21 October 2016	Wonderlandamusement Parks Pvt. Ltd	
Chaar Sahibzaade: Rise of Banda Singh Bahadur	Harry Baweja		Animation	11 November 2016	Eros International, Baweja Movies	
Kachhe Dhaagey	Buta Singh	Deep Mandian, Yograj Singh, Nitu Pandher, Jyoti Sharma, Shreyaa Chawla, Jatinder Kaur, Gurpreet Bhangu	Drama	25 November 2016	Batra Showbiz	
The Journey of Punjab 2016	Balraj Sagar	Rana Ranbir, Malkit Raouni, Anita Meet, Gurchet Chitrakar, Parminder Gill		25 November 2016	Soul Mate Films, Red Arts Punjab	
Motor Mitraan Di	Amitoj Mann	Gurpreet Ghuggi, Happy Raikoti, Sonia Mann	Drama	30 December 2016	Colors 9	
