= Jasleen Powar =

Horsepowar
- Born: Jasleen Powar; March 12, 1992 (age 34); Richmond, British Columbia, Canada
- Genres: Hip hop, rap
- Occupations: Rapper, artist, host, DJ, screenwriter, producer
- Years active: 2015–present

Jasleen Powar (born March 12, 1992), known professionally as Horsepowar, is a Canadian rapper, host, screenwriter and artist from Richmond, British Columbia. Her work frequently incorporates elements of her South Asian Punjabi heritage, blending hip hop with diasporic cultural references.

== Early life and education ==
Jasleen Powar was raised in an intergenerational Punjabi-Sikh household in Richmond, British Columbia. She became involved in the arts during her youth, participating in Bollywood dance, singing, and poetry. Her early performance experience included a youth poetry slam at Café Deux Soleils in East Vancouver.

Powar attended the University of Victoria, where she graduated with a Bachelor of Fine Arts in Theatre.

== Career ==
In 2018, Powar relocated to New York City and subsequently to Los Angeles, California, expanding her practice into multidisciplinary media. She modelled for commercial apparel campaigns and expanded her work into television and digital media hosting.

In 2018, she became the host of The Curry Shop, a digital food and culture documentary series produced by First We Feast, where she interviewed culinary figures and explored the global adaptations of South Asian cuisine, examining intersections of culture and immigrant identity.

Powar's media credits include a feature in a 2021 music video collaboration, followed by a guest appearance in an episode of the television series Red Bull Rap IQ (2023). In 2025, she expanded her creative scope into screenwriting, working as a story editor for the third season of the Crave comedy series Late Bloomer with collaborator Jasmeet Raina.

She also performs regularly as a artist and DJ, having appeared at major showcases including South by Southwest (SXSW) in Austin, Texas. Her work has received coverage in local and international publications, including feature spotlights in The Georgia Straight, Rolling Stone India, and GQ India.

== Personal life ==
Powar was influenced by her mother, citing exposure to Bollywood films and her own experiences of growing up in a Punjabi family in Canada as foundational influences on her artistic practice.

== Discography ==
=== Albums ===
- Lil Miss Canada (2020)
- BADDIE FACTORY (2025)

=== Singles ===
- "Powar" (2018)
- "Bold Woman" (2018)
- "Camera Phone" (2018)
- "Unbelievable" (2018)
- "Pisces" (2019)
- "No Lover" (2020)
- "Brown Angel" (2020)
- "Drink Juice" (2021)
- "tbh" (2022)
- "wya" (2022)
- "OVER" (2023)
- "AMNESiA" (2023)
- "I'M OK!" (2023)
- "BUTTERFLY" (2024)
- "SEMI TRUCK" (2024)
- "Alone With You" (2024)
- "Misinformation" (2024)
- "wanna link?" (2024)
- "FREAKLEEN" (2025)
- "BOLLYWOOD BB" (2025)
- "SPORTS BRA" (2025)
- "LEFT CHEEK UP" (2025)
- "THIS IS CRAZY" (2025)
- "STARBLIND" (2025)
- "Sexual" (2025)
