= Amitoj Maan =

Indian actor

Amitoj Mann is an Indian actor, director, author, and screenwriter known for his works in Punjabi and Hindi films. He made three films: Kaafila based on the concept of illegal immigration, Hawayein, based on the aftermath of Indian Prime Minister Indira Gandhi's assassination and Sucha Soorma. .Hawayein was well received, however Mann was less successful with Kaafila, which was banned in Pakistan due to the film's perceived anti-Pakistan material.

== Filmography ==
Combining a literary and film background, his father, Babu Singh Mann is a poet and lyricist in Punjab, has also produced a number of Punjabi films and along with several other awards, he has also received five lifetime achievement awards. Amitoj worked with Nadira Babbar's theatre group "EKJUT" and gained experience doing a number of stage plays thus evolving into becoming an actor and honing his creative talents as a director and writer too.

In 1992, Dilip Kumar, signed Amitoj as the hero for his directorial debut film Kalinga opposite Meenakshi Seshadri. However, the film could not be released due to unforeseen circumstances. Amitoj turned his vision from enacting dreams to creating dreams for the silver screen.

After directing more than 20 music video albums and winning awards for them, he wrote and directed a Hindi film titled Hawayein. This film emerges from the consequences of the Blue Star Operation in 1984 and thereon depicts the heart-rending aftermath of Indira Gandhi's assassination in 1984 leading to the riots and the victimization of Punjab and her people, the consequences of which were experienced all over India. This film was an honest exploration of the reasons which led to the angst of the youth of Punjab and the turmoils suffered by their families. It was the first of its kind subjects to be made and is the only celluloid depiction of this dark chapter of Indian history and depicts real life events and most of the situations shown in this film are authentic. This was an attempt to present history in a realistic manner on a colourful tapestry woven with all human emotions of romance, tragedy, humour all presented together on a platter of wonderful music. Shot in locations in Punjab, Delhi and Mumbai, Hawayein was a statement, which has succeeded in correcting the global image of the Sikh participation in the post 1984 Punjab problem thus satisfying the souls of lakhs of Sikhs, who for centuries have lived in perfect harmony with Hindus and all other communities all over the world. It released in August 2003 and was critically acclaimed worldwide. It was well received in India and did extremely well in the international market too. Hawayein opened up the territory of Canada for Hindi films, a territory which was previously considered a non performing territory for Hindi films and created box office history in Canada with record breaking collections. Hawayein also created history in Punjab.

His tryst with truth oriented movies continued with Kaafila, a film, based on the issue of illegal immigration, an issue affecting millions of Indians and Asians. This film is the story of the mad rush of people opting to leave their motherland in search of their utopian dreams of a better life abroad in the developed countries. The movie strives to create a mass awareness of the dark side of illegal immigration. The film also exposes how innocent people are duped by a worldwide nexus of agents showing them dreams of a comfortable life, close to heaven, in foreign lands and making them sell their lands, homes and livelihoods here in a futile pursuit of that dream. An intelligent, humorous and thought provoking film, passing on the message in an entertaining manner, based on real life experiences of people who have travelled illegally and have barely managed to come back alive. The star lineup included Sunny Deol, Amitoj Mann, Sudesh Berry, Sana Nawaz and Mona Laizza, both top ranking film and TV actresses of Pakistan respectively and other actors from India and Bulgaria. Cinematographer - Nazir Khan, Music - Sukhwinder Singh, Lyrics - Babu Singh Mann, Choreography - Raju Khan. Kaafila was released worldwide by ZEE network in August 2007 and was shot in Mumbai, Punjab, Ladakh, and Bulgaria.

His first Punjabi film was Haani, which means your companion. Haani is the story of the true men of the soil, the Jatts who are defined by their simplicity, honesty, courage, good looks and above all, for honoring their commitments lifelong, be it for love, friendship or even enmity. A romantic sage spanning two generations from 1964 to 2013, Haani tells the story of love, friendship and honor immortalized by commitment. Haani starred Harbhajan Mann, Sarbjit Cheema, Anuj Sachdeva, Mehreen Kaleka, Sonia Mann and others : Music – Jaidev Kumar, Lyrics – Babu Singh Maan and released on 6 September 2013 to worldwide acclaim and success. Haani was nominated for 9 awards & received 5 awards at the annual PTC Awards for excellence in Punjabi cinema held on 3 March 2014.

His second Punjabi film released in May 2015, titled Gaddar: The Traitor and starred Harbhajan Mann, Manpneet Grewal, Girija Shankar, Ashish Duggal and others. His third Punjabi film titled "Motor Mitraan Di" starring Yograj Singh, Gurpreet Ghuggi, Happy Raikoti, Vikram Ranjha Singh, Sonia Mann, Sardar Sohi released in Dec 2016.

He dreams for a living and his scripts are original subjects combining a personal vision with the requirements of a modern and entertaining film thus ensuring a global reach for it.

Year	Film	Language	Actor	Director	Story	Screenplay	Notes
1994	Naseebo	Punjabi	Yes				
2003	Hawayein	Hindi	Yes	Yes	Yes	Yes	
2007	Kaafila	Hindi	Yes	Yes	Yes	Yes	
2013	Haani (film)	Punjabi		Yes	Yes	Yes	
2015	Gaddar: The Traitor	Punjabi	Yes	Yes	Yes	Yes	
2024	Sucha Soorma	Punjabi	No	Yes	Yes	Yes	
