= Kafila =

Kafila may refer to:

- Kaafila, a 2007 film
- Ilunga Kafila (born 1972), Congolese sprinter
- Kafila, Bangladesh
