= Kahan Hai Kanoon =

- Directed by: Deepak Balraj Vij
- Produced by: Deepak Balraj Vij
- Starring: Aditya Pancholi; Kimi Katkar; Mandakini
- Music by: Bappi Lahiri
- Release date: 31 March 1989
- Country: India
- Language: Hindi

Kahan Hai Kanoon is a 1989 Indian Hindi-language film produced and directed by Deepak Balraj Vij. It stars Aditya Pancholi, Kimi Katkar, Mandakini in pivotal roles. The music was composed by Bappi Lahiri.

== Cast ==
- Aditya Pancholi as Vishal
- Kimi Katkar as Jyothi
- Mandakini
- Kader Khan as Joshawar
- Aruna Irani as Seema
- Om Shivpuri

== Music ==
Lyrics: Shaily Shailendra

Song	Singer
"Do Jism Ek Jaan Hain Hum"	Asha Bhosle
"Do Jism Ek Jaan Hain Hum" (Duet)	Asha Bhosle, Bappi Lahiri
"Do Jism Ek Jaan Hain Hum"	Bappi Lahiri
"One By One Koi Bhi Aaye, One By One Kadam Milaye"	Bappi Lahiri, Suneeta Rao
"Don't Call Me Baby"	Sapna Mukherjee
"Love Me, Love Me"	S. Janaki
