= Mera Fauji Calling =

2021 Indian action drama film

- Theatrical release poster
- Directed by: Aaryaan Saxena
- Written by: Aaryaan Saxena
- Produced by: Ovez Shaikh; Vikram Singh; Anil Jain; Vijeta Verma
- Starring: Sharman Joshi; Vikram Singh; Bidita Bag; Mugdha Godse; Zarina Wahab; Shishir Sharma; Mahi Soni
- Cinematography: Subhranshu Das
- Edited by: Pravin Angre
- Music by: Harpriet Singh Vig; Sajjad Ali Chandwani; Vijay Verma
- Production companies: Running Horses Films; Ovez Productions
- Distributed by: Panorama Studios
- Release date: 11 March 2021
- Running time: 128 minutes
- Country: India
- Language: Hindi

Mera Fauji Calling (transl. My Soldier Calling) is a 2021 Hindi-language action drama film written and directed by Aaryaan Saxena and produced by Vikram Singh and Ovez Shaikh under the banners of Running Horses Films and Ovez Productions. The film bankrolled by Jimmy Satish Asija, has ensemble which includes Sharman Joshi, Bidita Bag, Mugdha Godse, Zarina Wahab, and Shishir Sharma. The film showcases the story of a soldier who sacrifices his life in an attack and the struggle of his family after the attack. Inspired by aftermath of 2019 Pulwama attack, it also explores the various aspects of the life of soldiers and the struggle of their families.

The film was released in cinemas on 11 March 2021.

== Cast ==
- Sharman Joshi as Abhishek
- Vikram Singh as Rajveer Singh
- Bidita Bag as Sakshi Singh
- Mugdha Godse as Paridhi
- Zarina Wahab as Maa ji, Rajveer Singh's mother
- Shishir Sharma as Major Roy
- Mahi Soni as Aaradhya
- Ritu Shree as Bhoomi
- Abhijita Kashyap as Kriti
- Sidhi Jain as Suman
- Rizwan Kalshyan as Jai Singh

== Soundtrack ==
Mera Fauji Calling

Soundtrack album by Harpriet Singh Vig, Sajjad Ali Chandwani and Vijay Verma
- Released: 5 March 2021
- Recorded: 2020
- Genre: Feature film soundtrack
- Length: 26:49
- Language: Hindi
- Label: Zee Music Company

Official audio
- Mera Fauji Calling - Full Album on YouTube

The film's music was composed by Harpriet Singh Vig, Sajjad Ali Chandwani and Vijay Verma while lyrics written by Pooja Saini, Traditional, A. M. Turaz, Rajesh Manthan and Shakeel Azmi.

Track listing
No.	Title	Lyrics	Music	Singer(s)	Length
1.	"Peer Meri Piya Jaane Na"	Pooja Saini, Traditional	Harpriet Singh Vig	Rabbani Mustafa Khan	3:56
2.	"Hum Apne Watan Pe Mar Gaye"	A. M. Turaz	Sajjad Ali Chandwani	Divya Kumar	6:00
3.	"Bheeni Bheeni" (Male Version)	Rajesh Manthan	Vijay Verma	Sonu Nigam	4:25
4.	"Aa Zindagi Tujhe Zara Sa Ji Toh"	Rajesh Manthan	Vijay Verma	Hariharan	4:06
5.	"Mera Aasmaan Hai Papa"	Shakeel Azmi	Vijay Verma	Shalini Prateek Sinha	3:55
6.	"Bheeni Bheeni Si"	Rajesh Manthan	Vijay Verma	Pratibha Singh Baghel	4:27
Total length:					26:49
