= Vikram Singh (actor) =

Indian actor and producer (born 1980)

Ranjha Vikram Singh
- Born: Vikram Singh; 12 May 1980 (age 45); Jamshedpur, Jharkhand
- Occupations: Actor, producer
- Spouse: Simran Kaur (m. 2020)
- Children: 2
- Relatives: Shirin Morani (sister-in-law)
- Website: www.runninghorsesfilms.in

Ranjha Vikram Singh is an Indian actor and producer. His most notable role was as Rajjo Fauji in the film Heropanti as the antagonist.

In 2015, he also turned producer with his banner, Running Horses Films, for the movie 25 Kille, in which he also played the lead. He featured as one of the lead actors in Fauji Calling (2021).

== Career ==
Ranjha began his acting career in 2005 with the film Mumbai Godfather where he performed as the character Ram "Romeo", the main lead role. He has acted in 16 movies thus far. He starred in assorted Hindi language films followed by Souten (The Other Woman) 2006, Aatma, Old iss Gold, until in 2012, when he made his Telugu debut with Raghava Lawrence's Rebel. In 2014 he starred in three films, Ya Rab, 1, and Heropanti. He has acted in more than 21 Movies in Hindi, Telugu, Punjabi, and Kannada.

== Filmography ==
Year	Title	Role	Language
2005	Mumbai Godfather	Ram 'Romeo'	Hindi
2006	Souten: The Other Woman	Rajvir 'Raj' Singh	Hindi
2006	Aatma	Inspector Siddharth	Hindi
2010	Trump Card	Lead Role	Hindi
2010	Kuch Kariye	Javed Khan	Hindi
2012	Rebel	David	Telugu
2014	Ya Rab		Hindi
2014	1: Nenokkadine	Antonio Rosarius' henchman	Telugu
2014	Heropanti	Rajjo Fauji	Hindi
2014	Manasunu Maaya Seyake	Rocky	Telugu
2015	Rana Vikrama	Johnson and Louis Batten	Kannada
2016	25 Kille		Punjabi
2016	Motor Mitraan Di		Punjabi
2021	Mera Fauji Calling	Rajveer Singh	Hindi
2023	Dunki	Shop Purchaser	Hindi
Upcoming	Ziddi Jatt		Hindi

== Awards and nominations ==
- Best action in a film (25 Kille) - Filmfare Awards (Punjabi) 2017 - winner
- Best Actor in Debut Male (25 Kille) at Filmfare Awards (Punjabi) 2017 - nomination
- Best Actor in Debut Male (25 Kille) - PTC Awards - nomination
- Best Actor in Main Negative Role (Rana Vikrama) - South Indian International Movie Awards (SIIMA) Awards 2016 - nomination

== Family ==
Ranjha Vikram Singh married Simran Kaur in 2020. She hails from Ludhiana Punjab. They have two children: son Shauryaveer and daughter Kyraa.

His mother, Rita Kumar, stays with him

Siblings: He has younger brother, Uday Singh, settled in Dubai and married to Shirin Morani, the daughter of Indian film producer Aly Morani.

He has two sisters, Gauri and Dolly, married and well-settled in Dubai and Canada respectively.
