= Mumbai Godfather =

- Directed by: Deepak Balraj Vij
- Produced by: Seven Mountain Movies P. Ltd
- Starring: Seema Biswas; Vikram Singh; Rinku Ghosh; Manoj Joshi; Govind Namdeo
- Music by: Shreerang Aras
- Release date: 22 September 2005
- Country: India
- Language: Hindi

Mumbai Godfather is a 2005 Indian film directed by Deepak Balraj Vij starring Seema Biswas, Vikram Singh, Rinku Ghosh and Manoj Joshi. The film was released on 22 September 2005.

== Plot ==
The protagonist of the film is Romeo (Vikram Singh), who is in love with Shalu (Rinku Ghosh), an exotic dancer. He visits the pub where she works which gets raided by the police. He is arrested for possession of a firearm. The gun was handed to him seconds before the raid began by the character Manoj Masti Bhai (manoj Joshi).

Romeo becomes the victim of police brutality in prison. Angered by his mistreatment, he swears vengeance and, upon his release, solicits the help of Mumbai underworld don Vijay Bhaichara (Govind Namdeo) so as to kill Masti Bhai. The law, represented by encounter specialist Anjali (Seema Biswas) is on to grab the killer. Meanwhile, Romeo is getting in deeper with the criminal world in Mumbai. He forms a gang with Shalu and Vijay Bhaichara. Vijay has a falling-out with Romeo after Romeo kills a wealthy businessman named Naresh Jindal without informing Vijay.

An enraged Vijay becomes Romeo's arch rival. He sides with Inspector Anjali to finish Romeo in an encounter. One by one, Romeo's associates and friends are killed.

Eventually, Romeo decides to abandon his life of crime and start anew. However, his past catches up with him. Romeo is involved in an altercation with the law in which he is shot 6 times, but somehow survives.

== Cast ==
- Seema Biswas as Inspector Anjali
- Vikram Singh as Ram; Romeo
- Rinku Ghosh as Ananya
- Manoj Joshi as Mauj Masti
- Govind Namdeo as Vijay Bharucha
- Rajeeta Kochhar as Shanta
- Kishori Shahane as Kamla
- Himani Shivpuri as Shaloo,s mom

== Critical reception ==
The film was reviewed by Indian film critic Taran Adarsh who had a low regard for it, calling it "dull fare". He wrote that the film's plotline was formulaic, and based on a premise that has been done many times before in Indian cinema. Yet, he express some admiration for Seema Biswas's character.
