= Girija Shankar =

Indian actor (born 1960)

- Born: 1960 (age 65–66); Patiala, Punjab, India
- Education: Punjabi University
- Occupations: Actor, Producer, Director
- Known for: Mahabharat

Girija Shankar is an Indian actor, producer and director. He is most famously known for playing the character Dhritarashtra in the 1988 TV series, Mahabharat.

== Early life ==
Girija spent his childhood in Patiala, Punjab. He wanted to join the Indian Air Force since childhood but he didn't pass the test due to his age at that time. He now resides with his family in Los Angeles, United States.

== Career ==
In the early 1980s, Girija worked in the plays at the Prithvi Theatre in Mumbai. Director B.R. Chopra, who used to watch plays in the theatre with his family, was impressed by one of Girija's performances and offered him a role in his 1984 film, Aaj Ki Awaaz. He then collaborated with the director in the TV series like Bahadur Shah Zafar (1986) and Mahabharat (1988).

Girija played Dhritarashtra at the age of 28, in the 1988 TV series Mahabharat created by B.R. Chopra. He was unaware about the character before the production. But he accepted the role after learning about his importance and was considered to be the most challenging character in the series.

He debuted as a director with the 2003 comedy film, Banana Brothers starring Anupam Kher.

== Filmography ==
=== Television ===
Year	Title	Role	Notes	Ref.
1986	Bahadur Shah Zafar	Mohammad Bakht Khan	Episode 11	
1986-1987	Buniyaad	Ralliyaram		
1988-1990	Mahabharat	Dhritarashtra		
1988	Chunni	Hardayal Singh	Episode 1-10, 13-16	
1993-2002	Alif Laila	King Shahryar		
1999	Suraag – The Clue	Keshav Katre "K. K."	Episode 25	
2013	Uttaran	Agarth Yadav		

=== Films ===
Year	Title	Role	Language	Notes	Ref.
1984	Aaj Ki Awaaz	Minister Sri Kanhaiya Laal Tomar	Hindi	cameo	
1984	Ab Ayega Mazaa	Chopra saab	Hindi		
1989	Aag Se Khelenge	Inspector Ravi Saxena	Hindi		
1989	Bhrashtachar	Charan Das	Hindi		
1990	Jurm	Police Commissioner	Hindi		
1990	Shiva	Inspector Tejesh Akhouri	Hindi		
1991	Irada	Mr. Khanna	Hindi		
1991	Haque	Swami Hariprasad	Hindi		
1992	Honeymoon	Kuldeep Kaushal	Hindi		
1993	Pyaar Ka Tarana	Prem	Hindi		
1993	15th August	Dholi	Hindi		
1994	Mr. Azaad	Police Inspector	Hindi		
1995	Policewala Gunda	Don Kailashnath Narang	Hindi		
1995	Aatank Hi Aatank	Raka	Hindi		
1998	Sarbans Dani Guru Gobind Singh	Wazir Khan	Punjabi		
2002	Tum Se Achcha Kaun Hai	Arjun's brother	Hindi		
2003	Banana Brothers		Punjabi	Director	
2015	Gaddar: The Traitor		Punjabi		
2019	DSP Dev	MLA Bakhtaawar Brar	Punjabi		

== See also ==
- Mahabharat
- Dhritarashtra
