= Malik Ek =

- Directed by: Deepak Balraj Vij
- Starring: Jackie Shroff; Manoj Kumar; Divya Dutta; Rohini Hattangadi; Smriti Irani
- Music by: Anup Jalota
- Distributed by: Orion Pictures Corporation
- Release date: 29 October 2010
- Country: India
- Language: Hindi

Malik Ek (transl. One owner) is a 2010 Indian Hindi-language spiritual film based on Sai Baba of Shirdi starring Jackie Shroff, Manoj Kumar and Divya Dutta. The film is directed by Deepak Balraj Vij and the music is scored by Anup Jalota, who also plays the role of Das Ganu. The film was released on 29 October 2010.

== Cast ==
- Jackie Shroff as Sai Baba of Shirdi
- Kishori Shahane as Shakuntala
- Anup Jalota as Das Ganu
- Manoj Kumar
- Zarina Wahab as Shanti Prahlad's Mother
- Vidya Sinha as Vishnu's Mother
- Divya Dutta as Laxmi
- Rohini Hattangadi
- Smriti Irani as Dwarkamai
- Sudesh Berry as Kashiram
- Vikram Gokhale as Advocate
- Shakti Kapoor as Kulkarni
- Govind Namdev as Sahukar
- Rakesh Pandey as Collector Saheb
- Rajeshwari Sachdev as Saraswati
- Parikshit Sahni as Shankar
- Ramesh Bhatkar as Nanasaheb Chandorkar
- Rajesh Vivek as Trantik
- Alexx O'Nell as Macmillan

== Release ==
=== Theatrical ===
The film was theatrically released on 29 September 2010.

=== Home media ===
The film was digitally released on MX Player in 2023.

== Soundtrack ==
The music was composed by Anup Jalota and released by T-Series.

Maalik Ek

Soundtrack album by Anup Jalota
- Released: 5 May 2010
- Recorded: 2010
- Genre: Soundtrack
- Length: 37:53
- Label: T-Series
- Producer: Anup Jalota

Track list
No.	Title	Lyrics	Singer(s)	Length
1.	"Sai Baba Achche"	Jaideep Choudhary	Jackie Shroff	3:55
2.	"Sai Naam Mein Jadoo Aisa"	Manoj Kumar	Anup Jalota	7:05
3.	"Sagare Jagat Mein"	Sameer	Jagjit Singh	6:15
4.	"Diwali Mein Ali Ram Ramzan Mein"	Anup Jalota	Ghulam Ali, Munawar Masoon	5:17
5.	"Sabse Pyaara Mera Sai Baba"	Amit Khanna	Anup Jalota, Anuradha Paudwal, Sumeet Tappoo	6:19
6.	"De De Thoda Sa Pyaar"	Amit Khanna	Shreya Ghoshal	4:23
7.	"Sai Baba Geet Sudha"	Traditional	Pankaj Udhas	4:39
Total length:				37:53
