= Kahin Hai Mera Pyar =

- Theatrical release poster
- Directed by: Mahesh Vaijnath Doijode
- Starring: Jackie Shroff; Sonia Mann; Sanjay Kapoor; Abhishek Sethiya
- Music by: Ravindra Jain; Nikhil Kamath
- Release date: 1 May 2014
- Country: India
- Language: Hindi

Kahin Hai Mera Pyar (transl. My love is somewhere) is a 2014 Indian Hindi-language romance film directed by Mahesh Vaijnath Doijode. The film stars Jackie Shroff, Sonia Mann, Sanjay Kapoor, and Abhishek Sethiya. The film's soundtrack, composed by Ravindra Jain, was launched on 31 March 2014 at Novotel Juhu, Mumbai. It was released on 1 May 2014.

== Cast ==
- Abhishek Sethiya as Karan
- Sonia Mann as Priya/Shanti
- Sanjay Kapoor as Rahul Kapoor
- Jackie Shroff as Art Dealer
- Om Puri as Narrator (Voice over)
- Gajendra Chauhan as Priya's Father
- Kishori Shahane as Priya's Mother
- Nishant Sharma
- Eesha Agarwal
- Karuna Arya
- Shankar Sachdev
- Sunny Agarwal
- Dhaval Barbhaya
- Krupa Sindhwad

== Soundtrack ==
Kahin Hai Mera Pyar

Soundtrack album by Ravindra Jain
- Released: 31 March 2014
- Genre: Film soundtrack
- Length: 55:45
- Label: Worldwide Records Music

Song	Artist	Time
"Kahin Hai Mera Pyar"	Shaan	5:45
"Shamil Ye Ho Gaya Hai"	Suresh Wadkar, Ram Shankar	4:46
"Nach Baliye"	Sukhwinder Singh, Kavita Krishnamurthy	6:10
"Tu Hase Toh"	Shaan, Shreya Ghoshal	5:04
"Dilwale Dilwale"	Sunidhi Chauhan	5:01
"Allah Tala"	Kailash Kher	4:20
"Searching for His Love" - Theme	Siddharth Hazarika	1:07
"Kahin Hai Mera Pyar" - Theme	Shaan	1:04
"Hai Junoon" (Male)	Altamash Faridi	5:26
"Hai Junoon" (Female)	Tori Dattaroy	5:24
"Adam and Eve Theme" (Hindi Narration)	Om Puri	5:48
"Adam And Eve Theme" (English Narration)	Om Puri	5:47
