= Deepak Balraj Vij =

Indian film director

- Occupations: Director, Writer
- Spouse: Kishori Shahane

Deepak Balraj Vij is an Indian film director, who works predominantly in Hindi films. He has directed films such as Mumbai Godfather, Malik Ek, and Aaya Toofan.

== Personal life ==
He is married to Marathi dancer and actress Kishori Shahane.

== Filmography ==
Year	Title	Director	Producer	Writer
1982	Disco Dancer			Yes
1982	Zakhmee Insaan	Yes		
1984	Aaradhane (Kannada)	Yes		
1987	Sheela	Yes		
1989	Kahan Hai Kanoon	Yes	Yes	
1990	Sailaab	Yes		
1991	Hafta Bandh	Yes		
1992	Jaan Tere Naam	Yes		
1993	Bomb Blast	Yes	Yes	
1994	Stuntman	Yes		Yes
1995	Dance Party	Yes	Yes	
1998	Hafta Vasuli	Yes	Yes	
1999	Aaya Toofan	Yes		
2001	Shirdi Sai Baba	Yes		
2005	Mumbai Godfather	Yes		Yes
2010	Aika Dajiba (Marathi)	Yes		
2010	Malik Ek	Yes		Yes
