= Sucha Soorma =

- Theatrical release poster
- Directed by: Amitoj Maan
- Written by: Amitoj Maan
- Produced by: Sumeet Singh
- Starring: Babbu Maan; Sarbjit Cheema; Sameksha Oswal
- Cinematography: Inderjit Bansel
- Edited by: Hardik Singh Reen; Rahul Kumar Singh
- Music by: Babbu Maan
- Production companies: Saga Studios; Seven Colors Motion Pictures
- Distributed by: Saga Studios; Seven Colors Motion Pictures
- Release date: 20 September 2024
- Running time: 128 minutes
- Country: India
- Language: Punjabi

Sucha Soorma is a 2024 Indian Punjabi language historical drama film written and directed by Amitoj Maan and produced by Sumeet Singh. The film stars Babbu Maan in the title role, with Sarbjit Cheema and Sameksha Oswal in supporting roles.

== Plot ==
Sucha Singh, an ordinary man, played by Babbu Maan undergoes a transformation as he faces a series of challenges and circumstances that shape his journey into the legendary figure known as Sucha Soorma.

== Cast ==
- Babbu Maan as Sucha Singh.
- Sarbjit Cheema.
- Jag Singh
- Sameksha Oswal
- Ravneet Kaur

== Production ==
The film highlights Babbu Maan’s portrayal of a legendary Punjabi folk figure. Promotional material focused on the period look and music by Babbu Maan.

== Soundtrack ==
The film's soundtrack was composed and written by Babbu Maan. Official songs include "Boliyan" and "Mirza," released as promotional videos.

== Release ==
The film was released theatrically on 20 September 2024. It later became available on OTT platforms, streaming in multiple languages.

== Reception ==
Nonika Singh of The Hollywood Reporter India said that “It’s near impossible to rationalise why we are making such films in this day and age, which do not reflect upon the changing matrix of our society; or if they do, god help us.”
