= Haani =

- Directed by: Amitoj Maan
- Screenplay by: Amitoj Mann
- Story by: Amitoj Mann
- Produced by: Babu Singh Mann; Harbhajan Mann
- Starring: Harbhajan Mann; Sarbjit Cheema; Rupan Bal
- Cinematography: Krishna Ramanan
- Edited by: Sanjay Jaiswal
- Music by: Jaidev Kumar
- Production company: Mannerism Films
- Release date: 6 September 2013
- Country: India
- Language: Punjabi

Haani is a 2013 Indian Punjabi-language romantic drama film directed by Amitoje Mann and stars Harbhajan Mann, Mehreen Kaleka, Sarbjit Cheema, Anuj Sachdeva, Sonia Mann and Rupan Bal. The film consists of two story lines set in the years 1964 and 2013. The two story lines are told non-linearly and are interwoven with use of match cuts, reflecting the themes of love and commitment.

== Plot ==
Haani is a story of love and commitment. Moving between 1964 and 2013, Haani is the story of the Jatts who are defined by their simplicity, honesty, courage, good looks and above all – for honoring their commitments lifelong, be it for love, friendship or even enmity. Canadian born and bred Harman comes to Punjab with his best friend Tony and to his shock realizes that he can see and talk to the spirit of his grandfather Ranjit who has not been visible to anyone since his death 50 years ago. Ranjit’s spirit is still here in this world due to his promise to his lover, Sukhaan, that they would leave this world together. As the story unravels, we see that in the year 1964 Ranjit is a farmer and his best friend is Jagir. Ranjit is a widower with a 2 yr old son being taken care of by his maternal grandparents. Ranjit and Sukhaan meet and fall in love with each other. But those were conservative times and love marriages were taboo. A series of incidents later, Ranjit is killed and Sukhaan is forced to marry an army officer by her family and is widowed later. Destiny makes Harman fall in love with Preet – Sukhaan’s granddaughter. They, too, face the same problems. But they have a happy ending helped by Ranjit’s spirit and Sukhaan. Haani narrates the story of Ranjit and Sukhaan whose love reaches beyond the boundaries of death and how their incomplete love story is concluded by their grandchildren - Harman and Preet. A romantic saga spanning two generations, Haani tells the story of love, friendship, and honor immortalized by commitment.

== Cast ==
- Harbhajan Mann as Ranjit Singh
- Anuj Sachdeva as Harman
- Sarbjit Cheema as Jagir Singh
- Rupan Bal as Tony
- Mehreen Kaleka as Sukhaan Kaur
- Sonia Mann as Preet
- Ashish Duggal as Gurjant Singh
- Gurdev Dhillon as Ramu Ghaint
- Sardar Sohi as Rashpal Singh
- Gursharan Mann as Harinder Singh

== Soundtrack ==
Haani

Soundtrack album by Jaidev Kumar
- Released: 2013
- Label: Saga Music

The film's score and soundtrack were composed by Jaidev Kumar and was released by Saga Music in 2013. All lyrics were penned by Babu Singh Mann.

Track listing
No.	Title	Singer(s)	Length
1.	"Jagga"	Sarbjit Cheema	04:03
2.	"Heer Saleti"	Harbhajan Mann	04:35
3.	"Jaggo"	Manpreet Akhtar, Simerjit Kaur, Rani Randip	08:47
4.	"Teri Meri Jodi"	Devi Negi, Shipra Goyal	04:00
5.	"Teri Meri Jodi (Harbhajan Mann version)"	Harbhajan Mann, Simrenjit Kaur	03:26
6.	"Taang Sajjna de"	Shaukat Ali	05:29
7.	"Taang Sajjna de (Harbhajan Mann version)"	Harbhajan Mann	05:29

== Accolades ==
The annual PTC Punjabi Film Awards 2014 for excellence in Punjabi cinema was held on 3 March 2014. Haani was nominated in 11 categories and won 5 awards i: One of the Best Films of 2013, Best Story - Amitoj Mann, Best Lyrics - Babu Singh Maan, Original Background Score - Jaidev Kumar and Best Actor in a negative Role - Ashish Duggal, Best Technical Award.
