= Summer 2007 =

- Promotional poster for the film
- Directed by: Suhail Tatari
- Written by: Bijesh Jayarajan
- Produced by: Atul Pandey
- Starring: Sikandar Kher; Yuvika Chaudhary; Gul Panag; Arjan Bajwa; Ashutosh Rana; Sachin Khedekar; Swetha Menon; Vikram Gokhale; Nawazuddin Siddiqui; Prosshant Narayanan; Sachin Khedekar
- Cinematography: Attar Singh Saini
- Edited by: Bobby Bose
- Music by: Gourav Dasgupta
- Release date: 13 June 2008
- Country: India
- Language: Hindi

Summer 2007 is a 2008 Indian drama film directed by the debutant Suhail Tatari. The film deals with five medical students who undergo a rude awakening of sorts after visiting a Maharashtrian village and witnessing the misfortune of villagers. The film stars Sikandar Kher, Gul Panag, Yuvika Chaudhary, Arjan Bajwa and Alekh Sangal.

== Plot ==
Rahul, Priyanka, Qateel, Bagani, and Vishaka are medical college students with carefree attitudes. Rahul and Priyanka's failed relationship is shown in flashbacks. Rahul argues with an independent candidate and plans to form a political party and contest the college elections. Later, he patches up with a bigger political party and gets the independent candidate arrested in the fraud case of a suicide attempt by his girlfriend. After that, Rahul doesn't want to back off from elections. To avert this, they plan to go for an internship. The group goes to a village in rural Maharashtra that is struck by farmer suicide. There they work as medical interns in the village hospital. The group plans a vacation to Goa until they are awoken to the plight of the poverty-ridden villagers by the village doctor, Muky. In addition to their torment, a cruel zamindar and his son trouble the villagers with excessive interest rates.

As a solution, a reformed criminal offers monetary aid to the oppressed in the form of microcredit loans. This comes as an able ally to students who vow to help the villagers. However, naxalites and corrupt politicians complicate their efforts. How these socially awakened students rise above these problems forms the rest of the story.

== Cast ==
- Sikandar Kher as Rahul
- Yuvika Chaudhary as Priyanka/Pepsi
- Arjan Bajwa as Qateel
- Alekh Sangal as Bagani
- Gul Panag as Vishaka/Mother-T
- Ashutosh Rana as Dr. Mukya
- Madhurjeet Sarghi as Kamla
- Vikram Gokhale as Wagh
- Nawazuddin Siddiqui as Digambar
- Prosshant Narayanan as Wagh's son
- Sachin Khedekar as Shankya
- Neetu Chandra as Digambar's Wife
- Jayant Kripalani as Principal
- Rasika Dugal as Rasika
- Divya Dutta as Dancer
- Shweta Menon as D.S.P Keerti
- Shahab Khan as Teacher

== Production ==
"We are always talking about India being a superpower, and just 70 km away from any of us, the reality is something else, where 70 per cent of the people are unhappy."

—Suhail Tatari, director, while speaking about the choice of the subject.

Suhail Tatari, had previously directed features for Doordarshan's Surabhi, a popular programme in the 1990s. He continued his association with television by directing soap operas such as Reporter, Kanyadaan, Kashmeer and Don. After making an award-winning documentary on breast cancer, Tatari felt the urge to venture into commercial cinema. After meeting producer Atul Pandey, who was contemplating on a story about college students, Tatari convinced him to make it more relevant to the farmer suicides.

Actress Gul Panag treated Tatari as her mentor who moulded her into an actress. Hence, she thought it was obvious that she acted in his first film. Coming from a modest beginning, Yuvika Chowdhary was happy that her stint in the television industry helped her to adjust well to films. While shooting a cameo appearance in Farah Khan's Om Shanti Om, Yuvika was offered a role in this film. She was, however, unsure of committing to it because of the number of newcomers. However, Shahrukh Khan admonished her for the reason and cited examples from his own professional career. Chowdhary, after completing the shoot, was happy for her decision to act in this film. Being the son of veteran Bollywood character actors, Anupam Kher and Kirron Kher, Sikander Kher considered himself lucky that directors readily gave him their time if he sought an appointment. Kher, whose debut was first with Woodstock Villa, thought that Yuvika Chaudhary was a glamorous and a fun-loving person and this helped him enjoy working with her. Being cast opposite two newcomer actress, Chowdhary and Neha Oberoi (in Woodstock Villa), Kher thought he cared more for the character than being cast alongside established actots. He was grateful to the director for choosing him to work in the film. Alekh Sangal, the son of veteran filmmaker Ambrish Sangal, thought that despite four other characters sharing screen space with him, he was happy with the way his character was sketched out. He was also quite happy working with Kher and Panag and felt that the movie was a good learning experience for him.

The story, which is based on the agrarian crisis of the Vidarbha region of Maharashtra, was written by Bijesh Jayarajan. While talking about the extremities in the urban and rural parts of India, Jayarajan said that the focus of his story was on how money-lenders are exploiting the helpless farmers. One of the characters, which Jayarajan created was inspired by Muhammad Yunus, the 2006 Nobel Peace Prize winner and founder of Grameen Bank, Bangladesh's biggest microcredit institution. About what he termed as success for the film, Jayarajan said:

The mainstream media in the country has made a conscious effort to shield people, especially youngsters living in metros, from the rural realities. If those watching Summer 2007 at multiplexes realise this, and wonder why they never bothered about Vidarbha, the film will have achieved its goal.

Due to technical and logistic reasons, the film was shot in Wahi instead of the originally planned setting of Vidarbha. Throughout the shoot of 45 days, the cast was aware of the farmer suicides. Panag became emotional during their discussions during filming breaks.

== Soundtrack ==
The music was composed by Gourav Dasgupta and released by T-Series.

Summer 2007

Soundtrack album by Gourav Dasgupta
- Released: June 2008
- Recorded: 2008
- Genre: Soundtrack
- Length: 41:57
- Label: T-Series
- Producer: Gourav Dasgupta

Gourav Dasgupta chronology
Raaz: The Mystery Continues (2008)	Summer 2007 (2008)	Aa Dekhen Zara (2009)

Track list
No.	Title	Lyrics	Singer(s)	Length
1.	"Jaaniye"	Ujjayinee Roy	Ujjayinee Roy	4:10
2.	"Jaage Hain Baad Muddat Ke"	Vibha Singh	Sharib Sabri, Toshi Sabri	4:18
3.	"I Just Wanna Fly"	Ujjayinee Roy	Ujjayinee Roy, Aanchal Bhatia, Bonnie Chakraborty, Gourav Dasgupta	5:04
4.	"Baali Main Sone Waali"	Vibha Singh	Sunidhi Chauhan, Gourav Dasgupta	3:57
5.	"Kash Mein Kaash Khone Toh De"	Vibha Singh	Shweta Vijay, Bonnie Chakraborty	4:58
6.	"Jaaniye (Sad)"	Ujjayinee Roy	Ujjayinee Roy	2:03
7.	"Summer 2007"	Gourav Dasgupta	Shweta Vijay, Gourav Dasgupta	5:08
8.	"I Just Wanna Fly (Remix)"	Ujjayinee Roy	Ujjayinee Roy, Aanchal Bhatia, Bonnie Chakraborty, Gourav Dasgupta	4:38
9.	"Lets Burn The Sun Kash Mein Kaash (Remix)"	Vibha Singh	Shweta Vijay, Bonnie Chakraborty	4:20
10.	"Freedom Mix (Remix)"	Gourav Dasgupta	Shweta Vijay, Gourav Dasgupta	3:21
Total length:				41:57

== See also ==
- Farmers' suicides in India
- Microcredit
