= Lakha Lakhwinder Singh =

Indian actor

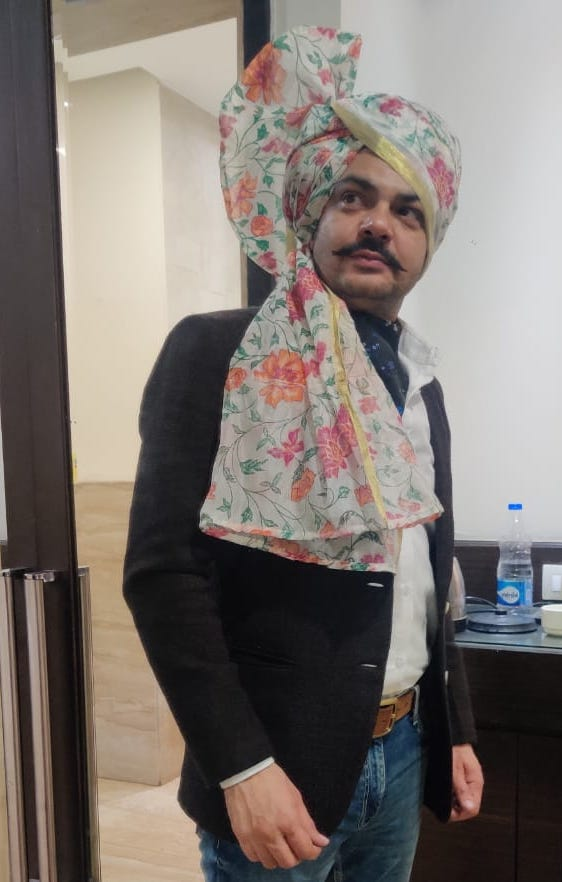
- Occupation: Actor
- Years active: 2005–present
- Notable work: Mitti Na Pharol Jogiya; 25 Kille; 31st October; Khadari

Lakhwinder Singh is an Indian actor who works in Hindi and Punjabi language films and television serials.

== Filmography ==
| Year | Title | Role | Language | Notes |
|---|---|---|---|---|
| 2007 | Partition | Special Appearance | English | |
| 2008 | Babal Da Vehra | Aman | Punjabi | |
| 2012 | Kismat Love Paisa Dilli | Parminder | Hindi | |
| 2013 | Pagdi Singh Da Taaj | Harpreet | Punjabi | |
| 2015 | Mitti Na Pharol Jogiya | Lakha | Punjabi | Ref |
| 2015 | Kaun Kare Insaaf | Yogesh | Punjabi | |
| 2016 | 25 Kille | Bholla | Punjabi | |
| 2016 | 31st October | Yogesh | Hindi | Ref |
| 2018 | Dhol Ratti | Dhol | Punjab | Ref |
| 2020 | The Hidden Strike | Lt. Lakha Singh | Hindi | |
| 2021 | Aape Pain Siyaape | Mithu Bajwa | Punjabi | |
| 2021 | Viraat | SP Singh | Hindi | |
| 2021 | Countryside Gunday | Lakha | Punjabi | |
| 2022 | Haveli In Trouble | | Punjabi | |
| 2024 | Jatti 15 Murabbeya Wali | | Punjabi | |
| 2024 | Khadari | Punjabi | Malkeet Singh | |

=== Television and web series ===
| Year | Title | Role | Language | Notes |
|---|---|---|---|---|
| 2005 | Nai Reesan Mere Punjab Diyan | Sufi Fakir | Punjabi | DD Punjabi |
| 2006 | Assan Hun Tur Jana | Baljinder | Punjabi | Channel Punjab |
| 2007 | Kaura Sach | Docter | Punjabi | Channel Punjab |
| 2009 | Meet Mila De Rabba | Meet's First Husband | Hindi | Sony TV |
| 2010 | Maharaja Ranjit Singh | YahiyaKhan | Hindi | DD National |
| 2010 | Raaz Pichhle Janam Ka | | Hindi | NDTV Imagine |
| 2012 | Kach Diyan Wanga | Aman | Punjabi | Zetc Punjabi |
| 2014 | Adrishya – Durga Bhabhi | Bhagat Singh | Hindi | Epic Channel |
| 2021 | Viraat | S P Singh | Hindi | Filmy Box |
| 2021 | Wah Jugni Wah | Rocky Dhindsa | Punjabi | Heeroz OTT |
| 2021 | Takhatgarh | Hammer | Hindi | MX Player |
