= Toh Baat Pakki! =

2010 film by Kedar Shinde

- Directed by: Kedar Shinde
- Written by: Vibha Singh
- Story by: Pramod Sharma
- Produced by: Ramesh S Taurani
- Starring: Tabu; Sharman Joshi; Vatsal Sheth; Uvika Choudhary; Ayub Khan
- Cinematography: Rahul Jadhav
- Edited by: V N Mayekar
- Music by: Songs: Pritam; Background Score: Raju Singh
- Production company: Tips Industries
- Distributed by: Viacom 18 Studios
- Release date: 19 February 2010
- Running time: 122 minutes
- Country: India
- Language: Hindi

Toh Baat Pakki! (transl. Then it's final!) is a 2010 Indian Hindi-language romantic comedy film directed by Kedar Shinde and produced by Ramesh S Taurani under Tips Industries. The film stars Tabu, Sharman Joshi, Vatsal Sheth, Uvika Choudhary and Ayub Khan. It tells the story of a middle class woman in search of a match for her sister. She happens to meet two matches and lands up in a dilemma about which to choose. The woman and her sister have different choices. The rest of the film reveals the hilarious chaos created.

The film was released on 19 February 2010, and received mostly mixed reviews from critics.

== Plot ==
Rajeshwari Saxena is a clever middle-class woman who is married to Surinder Saxena. She is currently looking for a groom for her sister Nisha, who she wants to marry a rich, successful boy. She happens to meet Rahul while grocery shopping. He is studying to be an engineer and is also a Saxena. Grabbing the opportunity, she offers him a room in her house. There, Rahul has the chance to meet Nisha, Rajeshwari's sister. They fall in love (pushed by Rajeshwari), and Rahul agrees to marry Nisha.

The wedding celebrations are underway when Yuvvraaj happens to come to Rajeshwari's house. He has a permanent job and will be buying a house next month. And he is also a Saxena. Upon seeing a better choice of groom for her sister, Rajeshwari tricks Rahul into vacating the room. Yuvvraaj starts staying in the now empty room. He meets Nisha and falls in love with her. Now, the wedding plans have altered slightly. The groom has changed. When Rahul finds out about this, he plans to outwit Rajeshwari at her own game.

Yuvvraaj becomes aware of the situation and steps aside and asks Rajeshwari to accept Rahul. Rajeshwari realises her folly. Rahul and Nisha wed and go on their honeymoon.

== Cast ==
- Tabu as Rajeshwari Saxena
- Sharman Joshi as Rahul Saxena
- Vatsal Sheth as Yuvraj Saxena
- Yuvika Chaudhary as Nisha
- Ayub Khan as Surinder Saxena
- Vishal Malhotra as Vishal Saxena
- Sharat Saxena as Rahul's father
- Himani Shivpuri as Yuvraj's mother

== Production ==
The film stars Tabu who has returned to acting after three years. She was last seen in Cheeni Kum alongside Amitabh Bachchan and later on in a cameo appearance in Om Shanti Om. This created great publicity of the film during production. Tabu was also signed by Sanjay Gupta.

Sharman Joshi is a friend of director Kedarh Shinde, who knew no other actors on the sets. He helped him work with other actors.

== Release ==
The film was actually scheduled to release in the September 2009 but because of the multiplex strike the film was delayed by five months and finally released on 19 February 2010.

Toh Baat Pakki failed to do well at the box office upon its release. It performed between 10–15% in the first week. This was a great shock to the public as well as the crew as it was highly publicised. The film along with Click and Aakhari Decision, which were released together, did not perform well. This proved that My Name Is Khan, which was released the previous week, still dominated the Box Office. In the first two-three days Click ruled over Toh Baat Pakki but later Toh Baat Pakki gained collections. The film grossed Rs. 34,500,000 and was declared a flop.

== Reception ==
=== Critical reception ===
Nikhat Kazmi of The Times of India rated the film 3 on 5 stars, writing, "Well, Toh Baat Pakki may not be as riveting as the 80s entertainers, yet it rides high on sheer nostalgia. Also, it presents a different kind of cinema in an age that lays great emphasis on high decibel, larger-than-life drama."

Taran Adarsh of Bollywood Hungama gave the film 2 out of 5 stars, writing, "On the whole", he says, "Toh Baat Pakki has a few interesting moments, but not enough to keep you hooked."

Mayank Shekhar of Hindustan Times, gave the film 1.5 out of 5 stars, saying that the film is mainly for those who love family dramas and emotions. He also adds that the sets and locations were lacking, along with the music. He says that the plot is inappropriate and the film continues on and "Why Tabu, really!"

== Soundtrack ==
Toh Baat Pakki!

Soundtrack album by Pritam
- Released: 15 January 2010
- Genre: Film soundtrack
- Length: 42:23
- Label: Tips Music Films
- Producer: Ramesh S. Taurani

Pritam chronology
De Dana Dan (2009)	Toh Baat Pakki! (2010)	Atithi Tum Kab Jaoge? (2010)
External audio
- Audio Jukebox on YouTube

The soundtrack consists of 10 songs composed by Pritam. OneIndia tells that the music has got mainly Punjabi mix beats like Jis Din and Dil Le Jaa. Taran Adarsh comments that the movie's music is poor except for Jis Din. which was written by Mayur Puri.

#	Song	Singer(s)	Lyrics
1	"Jis Din"	Mika Singh	Mayur Puri
2	"Phir Se II"	Sonu Nigam	Sayeed Quadri
3	"Dil Le Jaa"	Jassi Sidhu, Javed Ali, Indee and Shilpa Rao	Shabbir Ahmed
4	"Karle Mujhse Pyaar"	Pritam Chakraborty, Rana Mazumder & Soham Chakrabarty	Sayeed Quadri
5	"Phir Se" (Remix)	Sonu Nigam	Sayeed Quadri
6	"Jis Din" (Remix)	Mika Singh	Mayur Puri
7	"Dil Le Jaa" (Remix)	Jassi Sidhu, Javed Ali, Indee & Shilpa Rao	Shabbir Ahmed
8	"Karle Mujhse Pyaar" (Remix)	Pritam Chakraborty, Rana Mazumder & Soham Chakrabarty	Sayeed Quadri
9	"Aarti" (Traditional)	Antara Mitra	
10	"Phir Se I"	Rahat Fateh Ali Khan	Sayeed Quadri
11	"Phir Se" (Duet)	Rahat Fateh Ali Khan, Sonu Nigam	Sayeed Quadri
