= Rupan Bal =

Indian-Canadian writer (born 1990)

- Born: Rupanjit Singh Bal; January 26, 1990 (age 36); Amritsar, Punjab, India
- Occupation: YouTuber
- Years active: 2009–present
- Known for: Punjabi and English comedy and music videos

Rupanjit Singh Bal (born January 26, 1990) is an Indian-Canadian YouTuber, actor, director and comedian. Bal initially became known for his comedic roles in videos produced by fellow Indo-Canadian comic and YouTuber Jus Reign, and parleyed that role into further acting work. He made his film debut as the main actor in the Punjabi film Haani. He has directed many music videos for Karan Aujla.

== Early life ==
Rupanjit Singh Bal was born on January 26, 1990, in Amritsar, Punjab, India, into a Punjabi Jatt Sikh family of the Bal clan. He and his family moved to Canada from India when he was starting grade 10. He was raised in Brampton, Ontario. He received his earlier education from the Spring Dale School Amritsar and Turner Fenton Secondary School in Brampton and graduated from the University of Guelph, where he finished his degree in criminology.

== Career ==
Bal was originally going to attend York University but changed schools at the last minute. While attending University of Guelph, Bal met fellow Indo-Canadian comedian, Jus Reign and was invited to be in one of his YouTube videos. That first video was A-1 Shopping Cart Driving School, and Bal impressed Jus Reign enough to be invited for a larger role in another video Desi Parents. This was the first video where Bal appeared in character as Jus Reign's fictional mother. After two years of creating YouTube videos, Bal became an official YouTube Partner and began earning money from his videos.

His YouTube fame was noticed by Punjabi music legend and actor Harbhajan Mann, who offered him a role in his Punjabi film Haani. In a candid podcast interview with Amin Dhillon, Bal describes the moment he received the phone call from Mann. Originally Bal thought he was being pranked and hung up on the Mann. The transition from YouTube comedian to actor was difficult for Bal. He wasn't a trained actor and had never been on a film set before. Bal credits that film with giving him his acting training and he went on to star in his next Punjabi film 22 g Tussi Ghaint Ho.

Bal also appeared in a few music videos, including Mickey Singh's Body. Nowadays he is working as a video director in Punjabi music industry and owns Rupan Bal Films company. He has made videos of famous artists such as Karan Aujla, Deep Jandu, Bohemia and Jazzy B.

In 2017, he directed an MC SKULE educational music video, The F Word: Feminism.

== Filmography ==
Release	Film	Role	Record label	Film label	Notes	Music	Status
2013	Haani	Tony	T-Series	T-Series	With Harbhajan Mann, Sarbjit Cheema	Jaidev Kumar	Released
2015	22g Tussi Ghaint Ho	Rupan			With Bhagwant Mann, Upasana Singh and Jasmeet Raina	Teenu Arora	Released December 11, 2015
2015	The Last King (2015)	Co-Producer		Titan Films	With Jules Hartley, Steven Nijjar		Released November 6, 2015

=== As producer ===
Release	Movie	Role	Film label	Notes	Music	Status
2015	The Last King (2015)	Co-producer	Titan Films	With Jules Hartley, Steven Nijjar		Released November 6, 2015
2015	22g Tussi Ghaint Ho	Co-producer		With Bhagwant Mann	Teenu Arora	Released December 11, 2015

=== Selected music videos ===
Title	Artist	Co-director
Sheikh	Karan Aujla	Sukh Dhaliwal
Dont Look	Karan Aujla	Rubbal GTR
Hint	Karan Aujla	Rubbal GTR
Its Okay God	Karan Aujla	
No Need	Karan Aujla	
Na Na Na	Karan Aujla	
Haan Haige Aa	Karan Aujla	Sagar Deol
Chithiyan	Karan Aujla	Sukh Dhaliwal
2 AM	Karan Aujla	Rubbal GTR
Ink	Karan Aujla	Rubbal GTR
Chu Gon Do	Karan Aujla	
Click That B Kickin It	Karan Aujla	
Here & There	Karan Aujla	Aman & Amar Syaal
Addi Sunni	Karan Aujla	
It Ain’t Legal	Karan Aujla	
Ask About Me	Karan Aujla	
YKWIM	Karan Aujla	
Unity	Karan Aujla & Bohemia	
Shit Talk	Karan Aujla & Deep Jandu	
Pagol	Deep Jandu & Bohemia	Rubbal GTR
Up & Down	Deep Jandu & Karan Aujla	
Snake	Deep Jandu & Karan Aujla	Rubbal GTR & Director Whiz
Tension	Karan Aujla & Nijjar	
Alcohol 2	Paul G & Karan Aujla	
Crown Prince	Jazzy B & Bohemia	
Daaru Band	Mankirt Aulakh	
Glock	Mankirt Aulakh	Rubbal GTR
Closer	Mickey Singh & Dilpreet Dhillon	Rubbal GTR
Baby Gall Suno	Dilpreet Dhillon & Karan Aujla	Rubbal GTR
Sharata	Babbu Maan	Rubbal GTR
Koonj	Babbu Maan	
Still Around	Kulbir Jhinjher & Deep Jandu	
Punjabiyan Di Dhee	Guru Randhawa & Bohemia	
TBA	Diljit Dosanjh	
