= Naughty @ 40 =

- Theatrical release poster
- Directed by: Jagmohan Mundhra
- Based on: The 40-Year-Old Virgin by Judd Apatow; Steve Carell
- Produced by: Anuj Sharma; Kiran Sharma
- Starring: Govinda; Yuvika Chaudhary; Anupam Kher; Sayali Bhagat; Gurpreet Ghuggi; Shakti Kapoor; Smita Jaykar; Sanjai Mishra
- Cinematography: Kabir Lal
- Edited by: Ashfaque Makrani
- Music by: Monty Sharma
- Distributed by: Gangani Multimedia Corporations; Srishti Creations
- Release date: 29 April 2011
- Country: India
- Language: Hindi

Naughty @ 40 (also known as/earlier titled as Excuse Me Please) is a 2011 Hindi adult comedy film directed by Jagmohan Mundhra, while produced by Anuj Sharma under Gangani Multimedia Corporations and also distributed by Srishti Creations.

The film stars Govinda and Yuvika Chaudhary in the lead roles, with Anupam Kher, Gurpreet Ghuggi, Shakti Kapoor, Sanjai Mishra and Smita Jaykar in supporting roles. The film is a remake of the 2005 Judd Apatow buddy film, The 40-Year Old Virgin.

== Plot ==
Harvinder (Govinda) is a 40-year-old man living in London with his parents, Laxminarayan Srivastav (Anupam Kher) and Maya Srivastav (Smita Jaykar), an ardent lover of the Lord. He's still a virgin and sleepwalks in the nights. One night he sleepwalks into an unknown white woman's bedroom, causing mayhem for her lover until the white woman's husband shows up. Harvinder's father seeks the help of his employee Shafarat Ali (Shakti Kapoor) and his nephews to help Harvinder lose his virginity, but all their efforts are futile. This brings embarrassment to LM Kapoor.

Harvinder's friends attempt to hook him up, where one of his friends talks to a Chinese girl, who then leads Harvinder to her room. However, much to the dismay of Harvinder, he discovers "she" is a man. The next day, Randy, Sandy, and Shafarat Ali led Harvinder to the massage parlour. Harvinder then accidentally breaks the female massage parlour's nose. In a fit of fear, they break into a run. LM Kapoor then invites Harvinder to Uncle Chatur's (Sanjay Mishra) house, who is a heart patient, where Harvinder is head over heals over his daughter. However, one night, Harvinder ends up causing trouble for another woman due to sleeping on her bed. Because of his sleep-walking problem, girls reject him.

The family leaves for Manali, where Harvinder marries Gauri (Yuvika Chaudhary), a girl much younger than him. However, Gauri is up to childish pranks all the while, which results in Harvinder getting into a physical relationship with a London-based model who is in the town for a photo shoot. Harvinder thinks nobody will find out, but when Gauri does discover the truth, she gets a rude shock, which brings about a change in her attitude.

== Cast ==
- Govinda as Harvinder Srivastav (Happy Brother)
- Yuvika Chaudhary as Gauri Bahl
- Anupam Kher as Laxminarayan 'Allan' Srivastav (LM Kapoor)
- Shakti Kapoor as Sharafat Ali
- Smita Jaykar as Maya L. Srivastav
- Harish Kumar as Sandeep / Sandy (Sanjeev's cousin)
- Sanjay Mishra as Sanjeev's uncle
- Sayali Bhagat as Woman who rejects Sanjeev
- Rakesh Bedi as Dayashankar (Gauri's father)
- Gurpreet Ghuggi as Laxminarayan's employee
- Satwant Kaur as Sayali's mother
- Sudesh Lehri

== Soundtrack ==
The album consists of four tracks and was released on Venus music label.

Title	Singer(s)	Composer	Lyricist	Duration
"Bichhade Hue Tumse"	Shaan	Sayed Ahmed	Satya Prakash	04:34
"Thoda Main Adjust Karoo"	Sameer Tandon	Monty Sharma	Sayed Gulrez	03:51
"Der Se Sahi Main Samajh Gayi"	Shreya Ghoshal	Monty Sharma	Sayed Gulrez	03:24
"Hey Yaar Sunlo Jara"	Abhas Joshi, Rahul Mukherjee, Hrishikesh Chury	Monty Sharma	Sayed Gulrez	03:51

== Controversy ==
The film's release was delayed for over two years when the producers Anuj Sharma and Sandeep Kapoor had a fall out. Kapoor approached the Delhi High Court in 2009 seeking recovery of a loan of ₹ 1.32 crore which he had allegedly advanced to Sharma. Justice V.K. Jain allowed Sharma to go ahead with the film's release after his lawyer deposited a demand draft of ₹ 1 crore with the court registry. However, the court declined Kapoor's plea to release the amount to him stating "The question of release of money to the petitioner (Kapoor) would be decided after the entire amount is deposited with the court". He also asked Sharma to pay the remaining amount by 6 April 2011.

== Reception ==
Naughty @ 40 opened to mixed reviews from critics. Taran Adarsh of Bollywood Hungama rated the film with two stars out of five saying, "The film is for the hardcore masses who relish double entendres and saucy jokes." Rajeev Masand of CNN-IBN gave the film three stars out of 5 and stated, "Naughty @ 40 is a non-stop laughathon." Anupama Chopra of NDTV gave two and a half stars and commented, "Looked really good with all the trailers, but turned out as one of those rare films that barely get anything right!" Nikhat Kazmi of the Times of India awarded two and a half stars saying, "You have a film that can be an average weekend getaway. Nothing more, not even the plot of the laugh riot The 40-Year-old Virgin."
