= Hawayein (film) =

- Movie poster
- Directed by: Amitoj Mann
- Produced by: Nippy Dhanoa; Amitoj Mann; Babbu Maan
- Starring: Babbu Mann; Mahi Gill; Ammtoje Mann
- Music by: Babbu Mann
- Distributed by: Baldev Bhatti
- Release date: 22 August 2003
- Running time: 176 minutes
- Languages: Hindi; Punjabi

Hawayein (transl. Winds) is a 2003 Indian drama film directed by Amitoj Mann, who also stars along with Babbu Mann and Mahi Gill. The film is based on the 1984 Sikh Genocide and its aftermath, which led to its ban by the Congress government in Punjab and Delhi.

== Plot ==
Hawayein is a film that emerges from the consequences of Operation Blue Star and is based on the aftermath of India's Prime Minister, Indira Gandhi's assassination in 1984 – the 1984 Sikh genocide in Delhi and other places in India, and the subsequent victimization of the people of Punjab in the years that followed. This film depicts real-life events, and most of the situations shown are authentic, seen through the eyes of the "Sarabjeet." It is the story of his journey from innocence to disillusionment, from being a simple, music-loving student to becoming one of the most wanted militants in the country. This film is an honest exploration of the reasons that led to the angst of the youth of Punjab and the turmoils suffered by their families.

== Cast ==
- Ammtoje Mann as Sarabjeet
- Babbu Mann as Kanpuria
- Mukul Dev
- Tom Alter
- Mukesh Tiwari
- Sardar Sohi
- Kamini Kaushal
- Kulbhushan Kharbanda
- Mahi Gill
- Gursahib Singh Cheema
- Rama Vij
- Anandee Tripathi as muskan

== Track listing ==
Hawayein

Soundtrack album by Babbu Maan
- Released: 2003
- Genre: Feature film soundtrack
- Label: T-Series

No.	Title	Singer(s)	Length
1.	"Pabb Chak De"	Babbu Maan
2.	"Nachoongi Saari Raat"	Jaspinder Narula, Babbu Maan
3.	"Aaja O Yaara"	Sukhwinder Singh, Preeti Uttam, Babbu Maan
4.	"Teri Yaad"	Sukhwinder Singh, Preeti Uttam, Babbu Maan
5.	"Meri Muskaan"	Babbu Mann
6.	"Meri Muskaan 2"	Babbu Mann
7.	"Hawayein"	Sadhana Sargam, Babbu Maan
8.	"Bhangra Paa Laiye"	Sadhana Sargam, Bhavdeep, Babbu Maan
