= Late Bloomer (TV series) =

Canadian comedy-drama series

- Genre: Comedy drama
- Created by: Jasmeet Raina
- Written by: Jasmeet Raina
- Directed by: Peter Huang
- Starring: Jasmeet Raina; Baljinder Singh Atwal; Sandeep Bali; Ashley Ganger; Ahamed Weinberg; Sachin Mahashi; Sukhman Gill; Baldeep Sehmbi; Seher Khot
- Country of origin: Canada
- Original languages: English; Punjabi
- No. of seasons: 3
- No. of episodes: 24

Production
- Executive producers: Jasmeet Raina; Shebli Zarghami; Baljinder Dhawan; Laszlo Barna; Nicole Butler; Vanessa Steinmetz; Karen Tsang

Original release
- Network: Crave
- Release: January 19, 2024 – present

Late Bloomer is a Canadian comedy-drama series on Crave. Based on the life of comedian and YouTuber Jus Reign, the series follows Jasmeet Dutta, a turban-wearing millennial struggling to balance his ambitions for success with his commitment to his family, community, and culture.

The series was first announced in November 2020 as a project in development with CBC Television, and in 2023 it was announced the show would release on Crave streaming service, premiering on January 19, 2024. The series is produced by Pier 21 Films, with Russell Peters attached as an executive producer.

On June 6, 2024, Bell Media announced Late Bloomer was renewed for a second season. Season two premiered on April 11, 2025 with Jus Reign making his directorial debut.

In November 2025, Bell Media renewed the show for a third season, which premiered on April 24, 2026.

== Main cast ==
- Jus Reign as Jasmeet Dutta
- Baljinder Singh Atwal as Gurdeep Dutta
- Sandeep Bali as Supinder Dutta
- Ashley Ganger as Maanvi Dutta
- Ahamed Weinberg as Neal Soori
- Sachin Mahashi as Sunny
- Sugenja Sri as Chippy
- Sukhman Gill as Jaspreet Purewal
- Baldeep Sehmbi as Avtar
- Seher Khot as Rebecca
- Pragya Shail as Janat

== Production ==
The first season was shot in Toronto and Hamilton in the late winter of 2022 and early spring of 2023.

== Episodes ==
=== Season 1 ===
No. overall	No. in season	Title	Directed by	Written by	Original release date
1	1	"Nudes"	Peter Huang	Jasmeet Raina	January 19, 2024
When Jasmeet's laptop (which contains some very sensitive materials) goes missing, he weighs the dramatic repercussions of its contents spreading across the community. Terrified of the fallout and his family's reaction, Jasmeet tries to track it down with his cousin Neal, best friend Chippy and a stranger named Sunny.
2	2	"How To Be Viral"	Peter Huang	Jasmeet Raina	January 19, 2024
As Jasmeet looks for new ways to stand out and break out, he navigates seminars, influencers and agents who all have fresh, bold takes on how to be viral. Jasmeet wants to find his own path, but coupons and sales on milk get in his way.
3	3	"Turn Down for What"	Peter Huang	Shebli Zarghami	January 26, 2024
To celebrate a recent ad campaign that featured Jasmeet Dutta, Jasmeet, Chippy, and Neal went out to the club. By dressing and budgeting for the career he wants, they're building on his little success, and it gets out of hand quickly when Jasmeet realizes how far he still has to go and finds himself in debt.
4	4	"The Turban"	Peter Huang	Jagjiwan Sohal	January 26, 2024
Following a small child's observation of Jasmeet's turban, which seems to be a straightforward query about why he wears it, Jasmeet stumbles over his response and embarks on a mission to discover the actual significance of wearing it personally.
5	5	"Heat Check"	Peter Huang	Lakna Edirisinghe	February 2, 2024
As Jasmeet’s turban video blows up and a sea of positivity comes his way, he can’t see past a lone hater.
6	6	"Do Some Good"	Peter Huang	Cathryn Naiker & Shebli Zarghami	February 2, 2024
Gurdeep challenges Jasmeet to do some good for his community, but father and son interpret that very differently.
7	7	"The Rokha"	Peter Huang	Jasmeet Raina	February 9, 2024
It’s time for Maanvi’s rokha ceremony, and a reborn Jasmeet is trying to be the good son, putting family ahead of himself. It’s different.
8	8	"The Comedown"	Peter Huang	Jasmeet Raina	February 9, 2024
It’s the morning after the rokha, and the family’s trying to pick up the pieces.

=== Season 2 ===
No. overall	No. in season	Title	Directed by	Written by	Original release date
9	1	"Housing Crisis"	Peter Huang & Fawzia Mirza & Jasmeet Raina	Jasmeet Raina & Lakna Edirisinghe & Rahul Chaturvedi	April 11, 2025
When Jasmeet's new living arrangement complicates his relationship and career, he must make changes; when things go wrong, Jasmeet hopes his landlord is more forgiving than his parents.
10	2	"Poetry Slam"	Peter Huang	Jasmeet Raina & Masooma Hussain & Shebli Zarghami	April 11, 2025
After a financial reality-check, Jasmeet takes a paid gig where he finds himself in an uncomfortable run-in with his past.
11	3	"Not My Uncle"	Jasmeet Raina	Jasmeet Raina & Shebli Zarghami & Lakna Edirisinghe	April 18, 2025
In 2001, a young Jasmeet and Neal navigate middle school and the next step toward adulthood, their upcoming Dastar Bandi; the cousins tread new waters when they pursue the same crush, but everything is about to change.
12	4	"The Funeral"	Peter Huang	Jasmeet Raina & Shebli Zarghami & Lakna Edirisinghe	April 18, 2025
When a death in the family forces Jasmeet into an intimate setting with Neal and Gurdeep, he has to worry about keeping his relationship with Rebecca a secret; he isn't the only one with something to hide.
13	5	"Yoga"	Peter Huang	Lakna Edirisinghe & Shebli Zarghami & Rahul Chaturvedi	April 25, 2025
After a confusing yoga class, Jasmeet needs to catch a flight to an acting gig in LA, but he and Rebecca get caught in their first big fight over culture and ambition; Jaspreet takes up a lot of space at the Dutta house.
14	6	"New Canadian"	Jasmeet Raina	Jasmeet Raina & Rahul Chaturvedi & Shebli Zarghami	April 25, 2025
An international student works delivering food in between school and applying for office jobs; he runs into familiar faces as he bikes around the city, trying to save up for his girlfriend's arrival, but the odds keeping stacking up against him.
15	7	"Weekend at the Matthias'"	Peter Huang	Jasmeet Raina & Shebli Zarghami & Lakna Edirisinghe	May 2, 2025
Jasmeet spends a weekend with Rebecca's parents at their family cottage; Cornhole and French wine are unfamiliar family traditions to him, but Jasmeet is eager to make a good impression; if he could just shake this eerie feeling.
16	8	"For the Birds"	Peter Huang	Jasmeet Raina & Lakna Edirisinghe & Shebli Zarghami	May 2, 2025
Each at a crossroad, Jasmeet and his loved ones have to take a hard look at where they are and make some difficult decisions.

=== Season 3 ===
No. overall	No. in season	Title	Directed by	Written by	Original release date
17	1	"Search Party"	Jasmeet Raina	Jasmeet Raina; Neelu Handa	April 24, 2026
As Jasmeet recovers from a Rebecca-sized hole in his heart, the gang tries to lift his spirits on a special day.
18	2	"Not Another Bhangra Comp"	Fawzia Mirza	Jasmeet Raina	April 24, 2026
It's a bumpy road ahead as Jasmeet sets off to host yet another bhangra competition in the US.
19	3	"Rainbow Card"	Fawzia Mirza	Jasmeet Raina; Ameera Siddiqui	May 1, 2026
Jasmeet stars in his first Punjabi film, but last minute changes awaken Jasmeet to his community's questionable views.
20	4	"Don Dadi"	Fawzia Mirza	Nelu Handa	May 8, 2026
Maanvi counts on Jasmeet to distract Dadi so she can have her freedom - and her secrets.
21	5	"Crash the Stream"	Fawzia Mirza	Kaveh Mohebbi	May 15, 2026
Jasmeet takes a risk to reach a bigger audience, but at what cost? It's Prem's world and Jasmeet's just streaming in it.
22	6	"Crystals"	Jasmeet Raina	Jasmeet Raina; Jasleen Powar	May 22, 2026
Jasmeet takes a break from the internet when Maya comes to stay. But the length of her visit is just as unclear as her intentions.
23	7	"IPTV"	Jasmeet Raina	Jasmeet Raina; Neelu Handa	May 29, 2026
Flipping through IPTV channels, Jasmeet's friends and family hash out their problems in classic day-time TV shows.
24	8	"Punch Drunk Love"	Jasmeet Raina	Jasmeet Raina	June 5, 2026
Jasmeet and his loved ones grapple with tough choices and even harsher realities.

== Reception ==
=== Awards and nominations ===
For its first season, Late Bloomer was nominated for Best Comedy Series, Costume Design, Production Design/Art Direction in a Fiction Program or Series, Casting for a Fiction Series, Writing for Comedy Series, Photography in a Comedy Series, Editing in a Comedy Program or Series, Directing for Comedy Series for Peter Huang, and Best Writing for Comedy Series for Jus Reign for the 13th Canadian Screen Awards.
