= Yuvika Chaudhary =

Indian actress (born 1983)

- Chaudhary in 2018
- Born: 2 August 1983 (age 43); Baraut, Uttar Pradesh, India
- Other name: Uvika Choudhary
- Occupation: Actress
- Years active: 2004-present
- Spouse: Prince Narula (m. 2018)
- Children: 1

Yuvika Chaudhary (born 2 August 1983) is an Indian actress who has appeared in Hindi films such as Om Shanti Om, Summer 2007 and Toh Baat Pakki!. In 2009, she also acted in a Kannada film Maleyali Jotheyali, in a lead role opposite Ganesh. In 2015, she was a contestant in Colors TV's reality show Bigg Boss 9. In 2019, she participated in the dance reality show Nach Baliye 9 with her husband Prince Narula and emerged as the winner.

== Early life ==
Chaudhary was born on 2 August 1983. She hails from Baraut in Uttar Pradesh. Her father worked in the Department of Education.

== Career ==
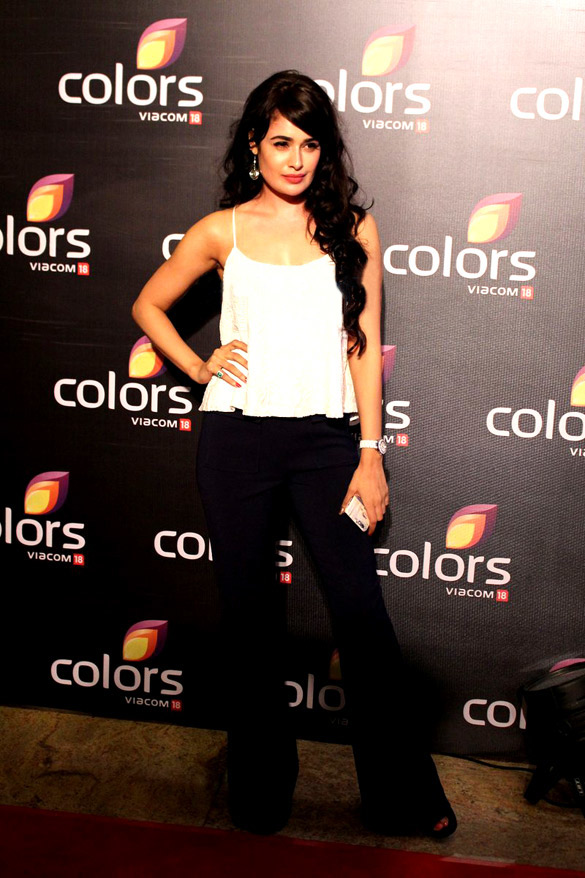
Chaudhary in 2016

Chaudhary started her television journey with the Zee TV talent hunt reality show Zee Cine Stars Ki Khoj in 2004. This led to an acting assignment for the TV serial Astitva...Ek Prem Kahani, in which she played Aastha. In 2006, she also appeared in Himesh Reshammiya's Music Video for the song "Wada Tainu" from the album Aap Kaa Surroor. She also appeared in a Coca-Cola advertisement opposite Kunal Kapoor. Farah Khan took notice of her and gave her a Bollywood break in Om Shanti Om (2007).

She later did films like Summer 2007 and Toh Baat Pakki. In 2011, she appeared in Naughty @ 40, her first role as a lead actress opposite Govinda, and in Khap opposite Manoj Pahwa. In Enemmy (2013), she acted opposite Kay Kay Menon.

Her most recent releases are The Shaukeens, Afra Tafri and Yaarana. She was also a part of Punjabi film Yaaran Da Katchup (2014).

Chaudhary made her comeback to television with Life OK's show Dafa 420 but was later replaced by Madhurima Tuli. In 2015, she took part in the reality TV show Bigg Boss 9. In 2018, she was seen in Zee TV's Kumkum Bhagya as Tina. She was also seen in an episode of Laal Ishq as Shikha opposite Prince Narula.

== Personal life ==
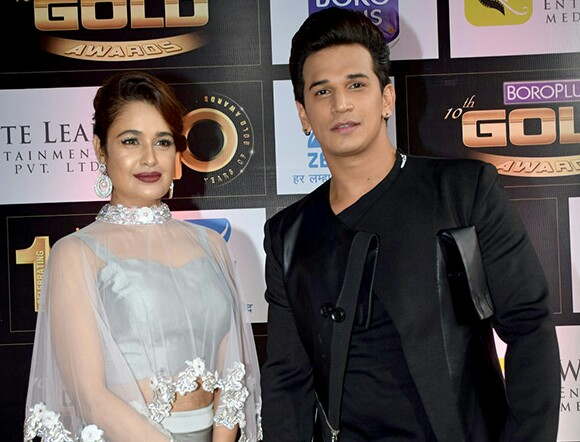
Yuvika with her husband Prince Narula

Chaudhari dated actor Vipul Roy for ten years. Chaudhary met Prince Narula during Bigg Boss 9. He proposed to her on 14 February 2018 and they got engaged. They were married on 12 October 2018 in Mumbai. The couple welcomed their first child, a girl, on 19 October 2024 via IVF.

== Filmography ==
=== Films ===
Year	Title	Role	Language
2007	Om Shanti Om	Dolly Arora	Hindi
2008	Summer 2007	Priyanka / Pepsi	Hindi
2009	Maleyali Jotheyali	Anjali	Kannada
2010	Toh Baat Pakki!	Nisha	Hindi
2011	Naughty @ 40	Gauri	Hindi
2011	Khap	Riya	Hindi
2013	Enemmy	Priya	Hindi
2013	Daddy Cool Munde Fool	Rinki	Punjabi
2014	The Shaukeens		Hindi
2014	Yaaran Da Katchup	Nona	Punjabi
2015	Yaarana		Punjabi
2016	Lakeeran	Roop	Punjabi
2018	Veerey Ki Wedding	Inspector Rani Chaudhary	Hindi
2019	S P Chauhan	Seema	Hindi
2020	Sab Kushal Mangal	Neelu	Hindi
2021	The Power	Shaila Thakur	Hindi
2021	Daketi	Chandini Singh	Hindi

=== Television ===
Year	Title	Role	Notes	Ref.
2004	India's Best Cinestars Ki Khoj	Contestant		
2005	Astitva...Ek Prem Kahani	Aastha		
2015	Dafa 420	Anusha		
2015	Bigg Boss 9	Contestant	16th place	
2016	Darr Sabko Lagta Hai	Riya		
2016	Comedy Classes	Herself	Guest	
2016	Yeh Vaada Raha	Herself	Guest	
2016	Amma	Rehana Sheikh		
2017	MTV Splitsvilla 10	Herself	Guest	
2018	Kumkum Bhagya	Tina		
2018	Laal Ishq	Shikha		
2018	MTV Love School 3	Herself	Guest	
2018	MTV Ace Of Space 1	Herself	Guest	
2019	Kitchen Champion 5	Herself	Guest	
2019	Nach Baliye 9	Contestant	Winner	
2019	MTV Ace Of Space 2	Herself	Guest	
2022	Cyber Vaar	Gauri		
2026	The 50	Contestant		

=== Web series ===
Year	Title	Role	Notes	Ref.
2022	Roohaniyat	Ishanvi Purohit	(Chapters 1–2)	

=== Music videos ===
Year	Title	Singer(s)	Ref.
2006	Wada Tainu	Himesh Reshammiya	
2017	Hello Hello	Prince Narula	
2018	Burnout	Prince Narula	
2019	Goldy Golden	Star Boy LOC	
2019	Lakk Boom Boom	Ishaan Khan, Abhinav Shekhar, Satwinder Noor, Charmaine Lobo	

== Awards and nominations ==
Year	Award	Category	Work	Result	Ref.
2020	Gold Glam and Style Awards	Stylish Couple (With Prince Narula)	—N/a	Won	
