= Bhid Ja =

- Directed by: Gautam Narwat
- Produced by: GW Films
- Starring: Baljinder Singh Darapuri; Bashir Khan; Michael; Himanshu Sharma
- Release date: 4 September 2015
- Country: India
- Language: Punjabi

Bhid Ja is a 2015 Indian Punjabi film based on Field hockey in Punjab, India and 23% of the film is self-shot as it is a one-man crew Punjabi film and without a cameraman.
