= Simranjit Singh Hundal =

Indian film director and writer

- Occupation: Director, Writer
- Years active: 2002–present
- Awards: Best debut director

Simranjit Singh Hundal is an Indian film director, writer working in Punjabi and Hindi film industry

== Career ==
Hundal started his career in 2002 and In 2013 before landing his first notable role in the Movie Jatt Boys -Putt Jattan De, for which he was nominated and won the PTC Punjabi Film Awards 2014 - Best Debut Director. He has directed more than 400 music videos and ten movies including Gun & Goal and 25 Kille.

== Filmography ==
Year	Title	Role	Language
2013	Jatt boys Putt Jattan De	Director	Punjabi
2015	Gun & Goal	Director	Punjabi
2016	25 Kille	Director	Punjabi
2019	Nanka Mel	Director	Punjabi
2022	Rabba Rabba Meeh Varsa	Director	Punjabi
2022	Kulche Chole	Director	Punjabi
2024	‘’ Haye Bibiye kithe Fas Gaye ‘’	Director	Punjabi
2025	‘’ Ziddi Jatt ‘’	Director	Hindi
2025	Constable Harjeet Kaur	Director	Punjabi

== Music Videos ==
Year	Title	Role	Language
2020	Kanwalpreet Singh feat. Ruma Sharma: Punjabi	Director	Punjabi
2020	Taveez Ranjha Vikram Singh and Sara Gurpal	Director	Punjabi
2021	Dhira Gill: Mehantan De Fal	Director	Punjabi
2022	Kachi Umar - Mannat Noor	Director	Punjabi
2022	Mutiyaar - Raj Bajwa	Director	Punjabi
2013	Hang -Garry Sandhu	Director	punjabi
2013	Sada Koi Vee Na Hoya	Director	punjabi
2017	Bhangra Paun Deyo - Navraj Hans	Director	punjabi
2019	Dj Utte - Feroz Khan	Director	punjabi
2019	Faraar - Dhira Gill	Director	Punjabi
2022	Bachcha - Simar Sethi	Director	Punjabi
2023	Rabb Lagda - Dilraj Grewal	Director	Punjabi
2018	Just Punjabi -Surinder Shinda	Director	Punjabi
2024	Jatt Kithe HAARDA - Dhira Gill	Director	Punjabi
2013	Yaar Bathere - Manjit Pappu	Director	punjabi
2023	Positive Vibes - Dhira Gill	Director	Punjabi
2017	25 Kille2 - Nishwan Bhullar	Director	punjabi
2013	Jatti End - Sippy Gill	Director	punjabi

== Awards and nominations ==
Year	Film	Award Ceremony	Category	Result
2014	Jatt Boys Putt Jattan De	PTC Punjabi Film Awards	Best Director Debut	Won
2015	25 Kille	Filmfare Award Punjabi	Best Action Director; Best Action K Ganesh Kumar for 25 Kille	Won
