= Lovely Te Lovely =

- Directed by: Minar Malhotra; S. Ravi Kumar
- Written by: Minar Malhotra
- Produced by: Vijay Dikka; Paramjeet Singh; Manish Madan
- Starring: Gurjit Singh; Kamz Singh; Hardeep Gill; Pooja Thakur
- Cinematography: Sonu Bains
- Music by: Pamma Singh; Nitesh Jyoti; Singh iqbal
- Production companies: SRK Creative Media; Parmyug Entertainment
- Release date: 24 July 2015
- Country: India
- Language: Punjabi

Lovely Te Lovely is a Punjabi feature film starring Gurjit Singh, Kamz Singh, Pooja Thakur and Hardeep Gill. Casting of the movie was done by Kamz Kreationz and Shaifali Srivastav. Music from the film was released on 18 July 2015. It was released on 24 July 2015.

== Cast ==
- Gurjit Singh
- Kamz Singh
- Hardeep Gill
- Pooja Thakur
- Sonika Chauhan
- Pamma Singh
