= Jus Reign =

Canadian comedian and actor

Jasmeet Raina
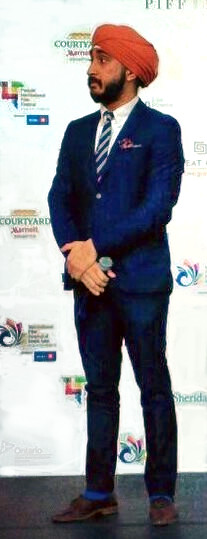
- Singh at the 2015 Punjabi International Film Festival
- Born: Jasmeet Singh Raina; November 4, 1989 (age 37); Guelph, Ontario, Canada
- Other name: Jus Reign

YouTube information
- Channel: JusReign
- Years active: 2009–2018, 2024–present
- Genre: Comedy
- Subscribers: 963 thousand
- Views: 189 million
- Last updated: April 14, 2026

Signature
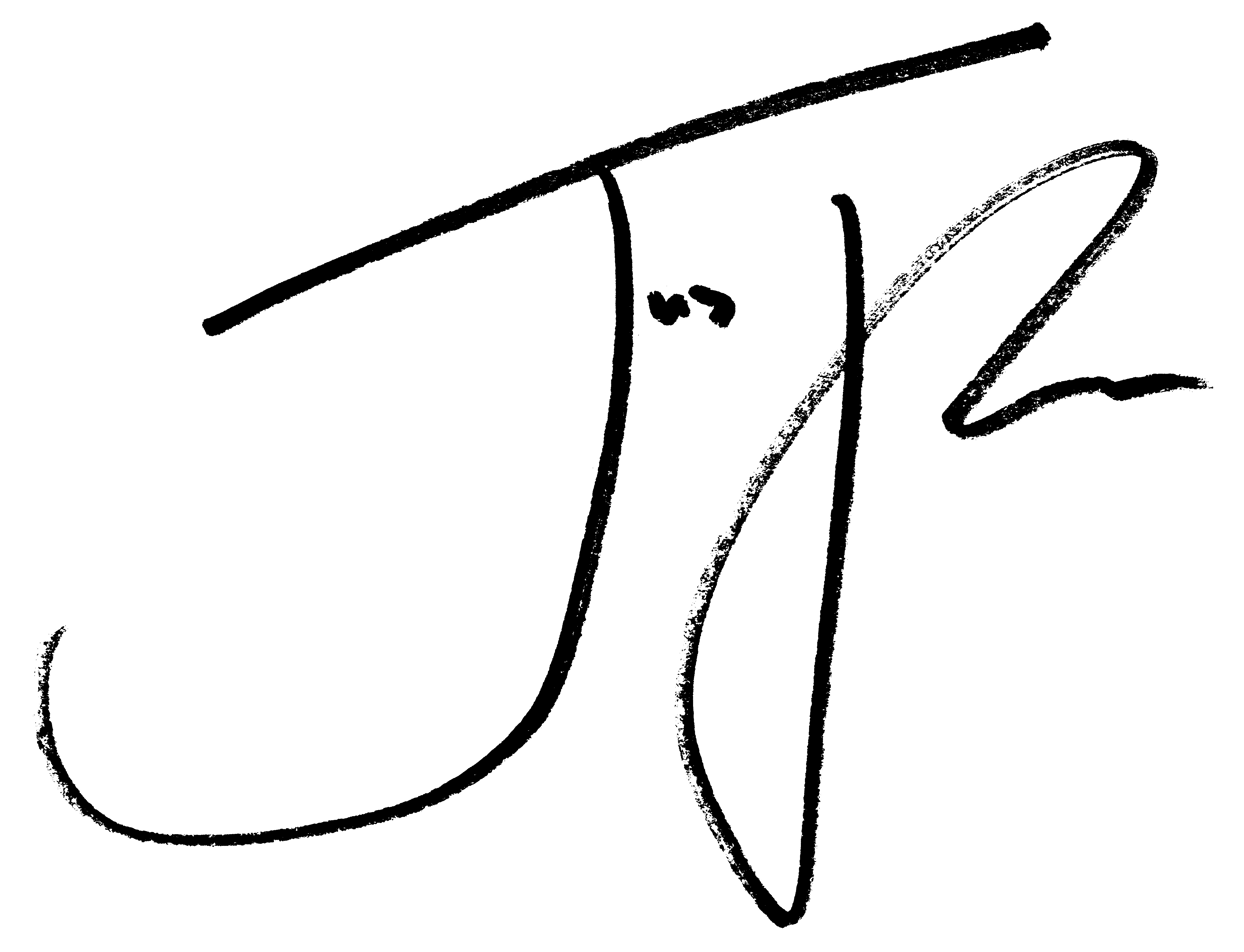

Jasmeet Singh Raina (born November 4, 1989) is a Canadian YouTuber, actor, screenwriter, comedian, and musician. He began making YouTube videos in 2009, under the name Jus Reign. He is also the creator, writer, executive producer, and lead actor of Canadian comedy-drama series Late Bloomer.

== Early life ==
Jasmeet Singh Raina was born and raised in Guelph, Ontario, Canada into an immigrant Punjabi Kashmiri Sikh family. When he was 5 years old, his father started paying a maestro to teach Jasmeet and his younger brother, Anmol, in Punjabi classical music. Jasmeet played the Tabla. He started to dislike playing it and as he has stated in his "Draw My Life" on YouTube, he argued with his teacher to the point where he got a tabla thrown at his face. He studied at the University of Guelph, where he originally studied to become a doctor to appease his parents' wishes. Eventually, the sketches Raina was creating on the side went viral and his parents accepted that their son had found success and have since been supportive of his YouTube career.

== Career ==
Raina's upbringing and his Kashmiri and Punjabi roots have provided material for his viral videos (his most popular being "THE SWAG SONG"). Most of his work contains pop culture parodies, while others provide commentary on race and his struggles with racism.

While attending the University of Guelph, Raina first met Rupan Bal and invited him to be in his YouTube video 'A-1 Shopping Cart Driving School'. Raina was impressed by Bal's natural comedic skills and decided to incorporate Bal further into his YouTube videos, creating the fictional character of Jus Reign's stereotypical Indian mother. The two worked together in a number of YouTube videos and later co-starred together in the Punjabi film 22g Tussi Ghaint Ho. This was Raina's only acting credit in the Punjabi film industry.

Raina is also one of Much Digital Studios' original creators, among a roster of various other online influencers.

In 2015, he was the red carpet correspondent for the Much Music Video Awards. Raina also starred in the web series Dhaliwal '15 where he played Bobby Dhaliwal, the first candidate of colour to run for prime minister in the 2015 Canadian federal election. The series was created and directed by Canadian filmmaker Amita Zamaana. He also collaborated with the Indian creative agency AIB in the same year, for the video "How To Cricket Basics and Training".

In June 2016, Raina was featured as a guest writer in 24 Hours Toronto's daily city snapshot "The Six in Toronto", highlighting hot spots to eat and hang out in Toronto. In summer 2016 Raina was included in The Bay St. Bull's "Power 50" list of most influential Canadians for his entrepreneurial skills and online notoriety. On June 19, 2016, he co-hosted the iHeartRadio Much Music Video Awards red carpet, speaking to stars like Shemar Moore and Tyler Posey. In 2016, Raina was featured in Playback Magazine's Top 5 to Watch. Also in 2016, he had co-hosted the Scotiabank Giller Prize.

Jus Reign made an appearance on Jimmy Kimmel Live!, in a creator edition of the show's Mean Tweets segment in June 2016.

In 2017, he and fellow comedian Wahlid Mohammad had started a podcast called Just 2 Boyz. Since 2018, he has been inactive on his YouTube channel.

In October 2019, Raina (along with other Canadian actors) starred in an interactive web-documentary by the National Film Board of Canada called Supreme Law. Raina plays the role of former Canadian Prime Minister, Pierre Elliott Trudeau.

In 2020, it was announced that Late Bloomer, a comedy series produced with fellow Indo-Canadian comedian Russell Peters, about Raina's rise to fame, was in development. The show premiered on the Crave streaming service, on January 19, 2024.

In 2024, following the premiere of Late Bloomer, Raina was named on View the VIBE's Power 60 list and one of their 2024 People to Watch, alongside Meredith Shaw and Nakissa "Keesa" Koomalsingh. The show was also nominated at the 13th and 14th Canadian Screen Awards, winning Best Writing in a Comedy Series in the former ceremony.

== Personal life ==
=== Turban controversy ===
On February 22, 2016, Raina was forced to remove his turban at San Francisco International Airport, an hour before boarding a flight to Toronto. Raina, who has a Sikh background, wears a turban for religious reasons. After being told to either remove his turban or book another flight, Raina complied, removing his turban in a private room.

After completing the security check, Raina asked if security officials could provide him with a mirror so he could re-tie his turban in private. But TSA agents refused, suggesting he walk across the terminal to a public restroom — his head still uncovered — and use a mirror there. Raina noted the experience was an embarrassing and sensitive ordeal, and that a simple fix, like adding a mirror to the private screening area or providing him with a handheld mirror, would have been more respectful.

The incident drew global attention.

== Filmography ==
=== Film ===
Year	Title	Role	Notes
2015	22g Tussi Ghaint Ho	Jaas	

=== Television ===
Year	Title	Role	Notes
2016	Jimmy Kimmel Live!	Himself	
2024–present	Late Bloomer	Jasmeet Dutta	Creator, writer, and executive producer

=== Web ===
Year	Title	Role	Notes
2015	Anarkali	Shaan	
2015	Dhaliwal '15	Bobby Dhaliwal	
2017	Robot Bullies	Robot 2	Short Film
2018	Ultimate Expedition	Himself	
2019	Supreme Law	Pierre Trudeau/ Himself	

== Awards and nominations ==
Year	Award Show	Category	Work	Result
2015	Shorty Awards	YouTube Comedian		Nominated
2016	Streamy Awards	Best Collaboration	JusReign and Timothy DeLaGhetto, YouTube Collaboration	Nominated
2025	Canadian Screen Awards	Best Comedy Series	Late Bloomer	Nominated
2025	Canadian Screen Awards	Best Writing in a Comedy Series	Late Bloomer	Won
2026	Canadian Screen Awards	Best Comedy Series	Late Bloomer	Nominated
2026	Canadian Screen Awards	Best Leading Performance in a Comedy Series	Late Bloomer	Nominated

== See also ==
- South Asian Canadians in the Greater Toronto Area
