= ATN PM One =

- ATN PM One logo
- Country: Canada
- Broadcast area: National
- Headquarters: Markham, Ontario

Programming
- Picture format: 480i (SDTV)

Ownership
- Owner: Asian Television Network

History
- Launched: September 29, 2009
- Replaced: ATN MH1 (2009-2017)

Links
- Website: ATN PM One

ATN PM One is a Canadian exempt Category B Punjabi language specialty channel owned by Asian Television Network (ATN). It broadcasts Punjabi music and family based entertainment programming.

ATN PM One originally launched as ATN MH 1 on September 29, 2009 and is available on Bell Fibe TV, Cogeco, Rogers Cable, Shaw Cable & Optik TV.

ATN MH 1 logo

In October 2017, ATN MH1 was renamed 'ATN PM One' due to loss of programming from MH1.
