= Gaddar: The Traitor =

Gadaar-The Traitor
- Directed by: Amitoj Maan
- Produced by: Saga Music; Grandson Films
- Starring: Harbhajan Mann; Amitoj Maan; Manpneet Grewal; Ashish Duggal; Evelyn Sharma; Girja Shankar; Shavinder Mahal
- Music by: Dr Zeus; Jaidev Kumar; Avishek Majumder
- Distributed by: Unisys Infosolutions Pvt Ltd.
- Release date: 22 May 2015
- Country: India
- Language: Punjabi

Gaddar: The Traitor (also rendered Gadaar: The Traitor) is a 2015 Indian Punjabi thriller starring Manpneet Grewal, Harbhajan Mann and Amitoj Mann. The film was released on 22 May 2015.

== Cast ==
- Manpneet Grewal
- Amitoj Maan as Shaheed Rashpal Singh
- Harbhajan Mann as Jai Singh
- Ashish Duggal as SP Sandhu
- Evelyn Sharma
- Satwant Kaur as Jai's mother
- Girjia Shankar
- Shavinder Mahal
- Rupinder Roopi
- Anita Meet
- Tarsem Paul CM Baldev Singh
- Balkaran Wadding
- Bobby Sandhu as Sandy
