= Motor Mitraan Di =

- Directed by: Amitoj Maan
- Screenplay by: Amitoj Mann
- Produced by: Poornima Bhattacharya (Supervising producer)
- Starring: Gurpreet Ghuggi; Happy Raikoti; Vikram Ranjha Singh; Sonia Mann; Yograj Singh
- Cinematography: Krishna Ramanan
- Edited by: Inder Singh Rattaul
- Music by: Jaidev Kumar
- Production company: Color 9 Entertainment
- Release date: 30 December 2016
- Country: India
- Language: Punjabi

Motor Mitraan Di is a Punjabi comedy film directed by Amitoj Mann starring Gurpreet Ghuggi, Happy Raikoti, Vikram Ranjha Singh, Sonia Mann, and Yograj Singh. It is a humorous expose of the self-styled Godmen who make their living by duping innocent people.

== Plot ==
Bhaajj (Gurpreet Ghuggi) is Punjabi man who owns a vehicle repair workshop and who hates women. Bhaajj's cousin Ravi works for him and his younger brother Rajveer is jobless. Rajveer seeks blessing from a local religious head Babaji (Yograj Singh) at his temple Ashram, Babaji's right hand preacher Swami gives his predicts to Rajveer that the latter will not find a job, but will start his own business.

Inspired by Swami, Rajveer buys a second hand bus from a client of his older brother's workshop, and asks his older brother Bhaajj to renew it so that they can drive it as business. Bhaajj reluctantly agrees. They give all female passengers 50% discount as promotional strategy. and their advertisement emphasize on that they will protect all female passengers, unlike other buses, where female passengers are often harassed by men. One of their passengers Preet therefore develops her feeling for Rajveer.

Soon, they find the business is hard for them as they can collect too few passengers each time, so they decide to use the bus as shuttle bus for Babaji's devotees.

Babaji gives a trunk to Swami and Deepak (Harsharan Singh) with a girl's dead body inside, asking them to deal with the body smoothly. They agree, hinting this is not the first murder they have committed. They decide to use Rajveer's bus to drop the body.

They load the trunk on the roof of the bus, planning to drop the body in a river when the bus crossing it. However, in the night, when the bus is passing a bridge and Deepak is almost dropping the body from the roof, Ravi, who is driving the bus at the time and very sleepy, suddenly hits the brake due to a sudden awake. Deepak unintentionally drops the body from the front side of the bus due to the shake.

Ravi, Bhaaj and Rajveer get off the bus to check what happened. They are all shocked to see a dead body lying in front of the bus—which is nobody but Preet—and think it's Ravi that hit her to death. They decide to load it to the roof and drop it somewhere so that nobody will know it.

The next day, they drop the trunk in a river when the bus is temporarily stopped. Two bums spot the scene, assuming the trunk is full of treasures and get it back. They catch another bus and on the roof to secretly open and share the "treasure". However, to their shock, it's dead body inside. When the bus stops, the bums move the trunk to the roof of another bus that is right beside theirs. The other bus happens to be Rajveer's.

Ravi and Deepak are later shocked and scared to see that the trunk containing the dead body is back on the bus roof, thinking it has become a ghost and will take revenge. However, Ravi and his men decide to drop it again. When they arrive a hospital, they take to dead body inside and put it on a patient bed.

== Cast ==
- Gurpreet Ghuggi as Bhaaji
- Sonia Mann as Preet
- Happy Raikoti as Ravi
- Vikram Singh as Rajveer
- Yograj Singh as Babaji
- Sardar Sohi as Swami
- Harsharan Singh as Deepak
- Anita Meet
- Prakash Singh Gaadu
- Gurmeet Saajan
- Jagdeep Lamba
- Gurpreet Tot
