= 22g Tussi Ghaint Ho =

2015 Indian-Punjabi political comedy film

- Directed by: Vishal Parasher
- Written by: Bhagwant Mann
- Produced by: Deepak Verma, Priya Verma and Kamayani Sharma
- Starring: Rupan Bal; Bhagwant Mann; Jasmeet Singh (Jus Reign); Upasana Singh
- Narrated by: Yogesh Grover
- Cinematography: Sapan Narula
- Edited by: Mukesh Thakur
- Music by: Teenu Arora
- Production companies: DEC Productions & OMKARA Productions Pvt. Ltd.
- Distributed by: Omjee Group
- Release date: 11 December 2015
- Running time: 120 minutes
- Country: India
- Language: Punjabi

22g Tussi Ghaint Ho is a 2015 Indian-Punjabi political comedy film written by Bhagwant Mann and directed by Vishal Parasher. It stars Bhagwant Mann, Rupan Bal, Upasana Singh, and Jus Reign in prominent roles.

== Cast ==
- Bhagwant Mann as Boota Singh
- Rupan Bal as Rupan
- Pooja Verma as Lovleen
- Jus Reign as Jass
- Upasana Singh as Gulabo - Boota's Wife
- Tej Sapru as Bhakhtawar Singh
- Rana Jung Bahadur as Professor
- Ravinder Mand as PA Bansi Sharma
- Tumul Balyan as Rocky
- Tejinder Singh as Constable Milkha singh
- Raghveer Boli as Constable Dara Singh
- Gurpreet Bhangu as Manjeet Kaur

== Reception ==
=== Critical response ===
Tahira Bhasin of ABP Sanjha called the film "entertaining and interesting". She also said that the film could work as a "good campaign for Bhagat Mann for the 2017 elections." Jasmine Singh of Tribune India gave the film 2 out of 5, writing, "The film is rich in content, has some hard-hitting dialogues and also some fun-evoking ones. However, director Vishal has ended up making this film like a promotional campaign for some party! Had he given it a seriously funny touch, the story would have been different".
