= Sonia Mann =

Indian actress and model

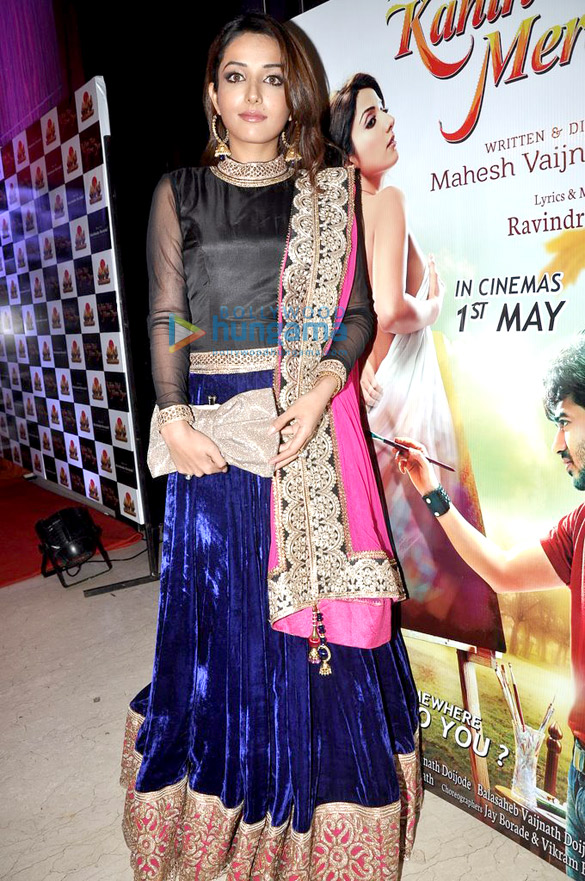
- Mann during Kahin Hai Mera Pyar in 2014
- Born: Haldwani, Uttarakhand, India
- Occupations: Actress, model
- Father: Baldev Singh Mann

Sonia Mann is an Indian actress and model. She has appeared in films and music videos.

== Early life and education ==
Sonia Mann was born in Haldwani to Baldev Singh Mann and Paramjit Kaur. Her father was a left wing activist. He was killed by Khalistani militants in Amritsar in 1986. She was brought up in Amritsar. She completed her school education from Holy Heart Presidency School. She then studied at BBK DAV College for Women, Amritsar.

== Career ==
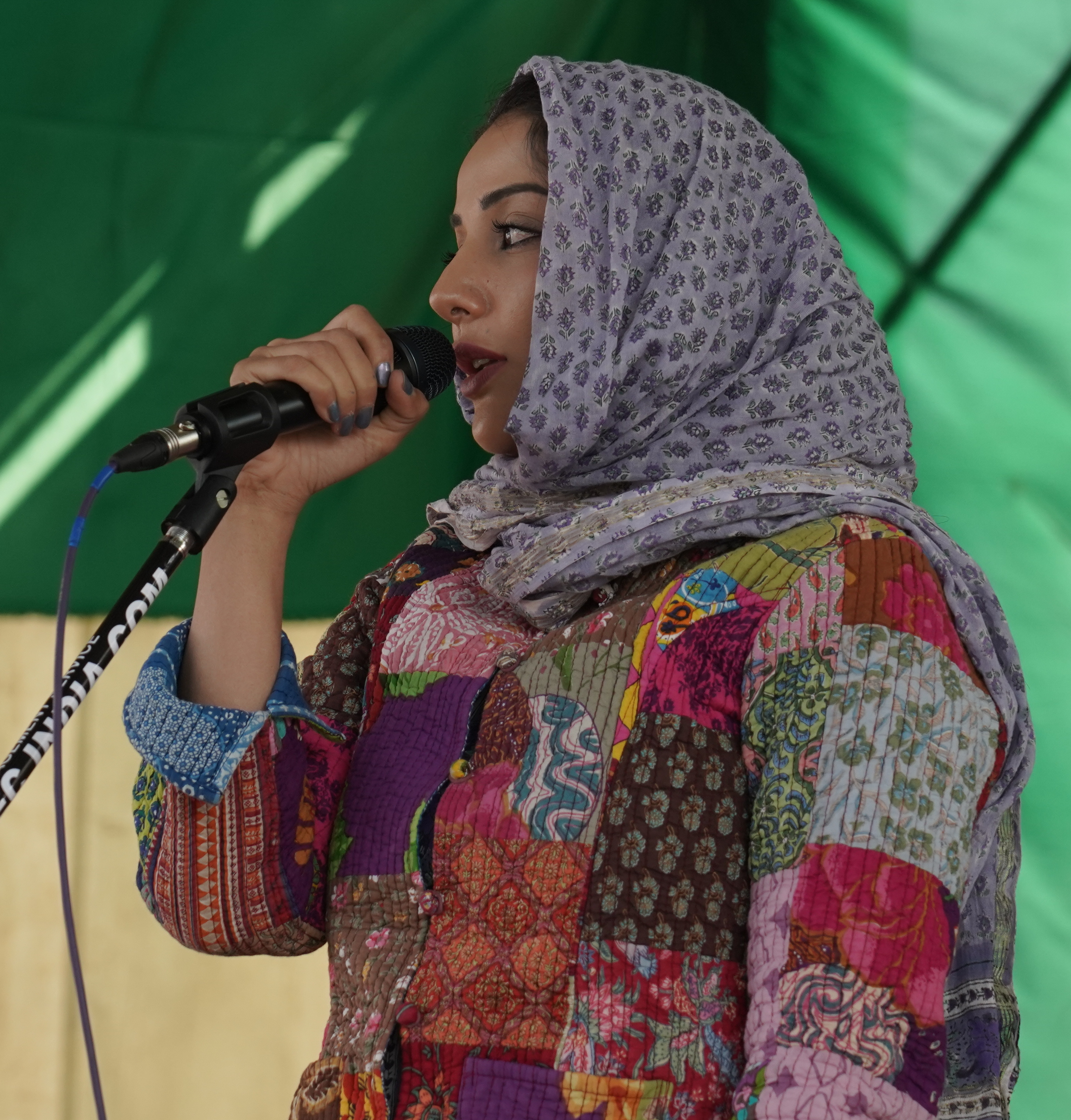
Mann at Indian Farmers' Protest (15 February 2021)

Mann appeared in many Punjabi music videos. Malayalam film Hide N' Seek in 2012 was her acting debut in film . Then, she appeared in another Malayalam film titled Teens which was released in 2013. She also appeared in a Punjabi film titled Haani which was released in 2013. Her Punjabi film Bade Changey Ne Mere Yaar Kaminey was released in 2014. She also appeared in a Hindi film in that year titled Kahin Hai Mera Pyar.

Mann's Telugu film Dhee Ante Dhee was released in 2015. Her Punjabi film 25 Kille was released in 2016. Another Punjabi film titled Motor Mitraan Di featuring her was also released in that year.

Mann did a cameo role on a Marathi film titled Hrudayantar in 2017. Her second Telugu film titled Dr. Chakravarthy was also released in that year. She was also a part of Hindi film Happy Hardy and Heer which was released on 31 January 2020.

== Political career ==
Mann joined Aam Aadmi Party (AAP) in the presence of AAP National Convenor & former Delhi CM Arvind Kejriwal on 23 February 2025.

== Filmography ==
Year	Film	Role	Language	Note
2012	Hide N' Seek		Malayalam	Malayalam debut
2013	Teens	Lekha	Malayalam	
2013	Haani	Preet	Punjabi	Punjabi debut
2014	Bade Changey Ne Mere Yaar Kaminey	Kamini	Punjabi	
2014	Kahin Hai Mera Pyar	Priya/Shanti	Hindi	Hindi debut
2015	Dhee Ante Dhee	Lakshmi Prasanna	Telugu	Telugu debut
2016	25 Kille	Sonia Mann	Punjabi	
2016	Motor Mitraan Di	Preet	Punjabi	
2017	Hrudayantar	Sonia	Marathi	Cameo appearance
2017	Dr. Chakravarty	Sonia	Telugu	
2020	Happy Hardy and Heer	Heer Randhawa	Hindi	

=== Music video appearances ===
Year	Title	With
2018	"Tochan"	Sidhu Moosewala
2018	"Difference"	Amrit Maan
2018	"Teeje week"	Jordan Sandhu
2021	"Dil Todna"	Singga
2022	"Dil Diwana Hai"	Jassi Gill
