= Kaafila =

2007 film by Ammtoje Mann

- Theatrical release poster
- Directed by: Amitoj Mann
- Screenplay by: Amitoj Mann
- Dialogues by: Varun Gautam
- Story by: Amitoj Mann
- Produced by: Tony Sandhu; Poornima Bhattacharya; Amrinder Singh Jackie
- Starring: Sunny Deol; Amitoj Mann; Polina Stoynova; Sana Nawaz; Sara Loren; Sudesh Berry
- Cinematography: Nazir Khan
- Edited by: Tirupathi Reddy
- Music by: Songs: Sukhwinder Singh; Score: Sanjoy Chowdhury
- Production company: Mannerism Films
- Distributed by: Zee Network
- Release date: 10 August 2007
- Country: India
- Language: Hindi

Kaafila (English: Caravan) is a 2007 Indian Hindi-language action film, directed by Amitoj Mann, released on 10 August 2007. The film stars Sunny Deol, Amitoj Maan, Polina Stoynova, Sana Nawaz, Sara Loren and Sudesh Berry.

== Plot ==
Kaafila is primarily a story about the devastating issue of illegal immigration (Dunki) and the desperation of people seeking a "better life" abroad. The film follows a large group of around 200 people, a "Kaafila" (Caravan), from India, Pakistan and Bangladesh, who are all lured by an unscrupulous agent with the promise of transporting them illegally to Western countries, such as the UK, for a utopian dream of a better life. These hopeful immigrants, who have put their families, careers, and savings at stake, include various characters like a disgraced Army officer, Captain Aman Sachdev, and a farmer, Santokh Singh.

The journey quickly turns into a nightmare, as the group is abandoned by their agents and left to fend for themselves in the harsh conditions of Eastern Europe. They are forced to traverse treacherous terrain, including cold Ukrainian forests and Russian snow fields, leading to immense suffering and the loss of many lives through hunger, illness, and accidents.

As the dwindling group continues its perilous trek, their struggles evolve into a fight for survival. They become entangled with the Russian mafia involved in a dangerous plutonium smuggling racket and face threats from militants on the Afghan borders.

At this point, a mysterious guide and secret agent, Colonel Sameer Ahmed Khan, an undercover Pakistan Army officer working for his country, enters their lives. He helps to bond the remaining members of the "Kaafila" and protect them from the dangers they face. He fights against their adversaries, leading them through various countries like Tajikistan, Russia, and Afghanistan.

Eventually, the contingent traces their way back to Pakistan. The end reveals a significant change of heart for the travellers, as the horrors and hardships they endured on their search for a foreign utopia make them realize the true value and importance of their own motherland, prompting their decision to return to their native homes.

== Cast ==
- Sunny Deol as Colonel Sameer Ahmed Khan
- Amitoj Mann as Aman Sachdev
- Polina Stoynova as Polina Khan – Sameer's wife
- Sana Nawaz (a.k.a. Sana Fakhar) as Alisha
- Sara Loren (a.k.a. Sara Hussain – introduced in this film as Mona Liza) as Niharika
- Sudesh Berry as Santokh Singh
- Satwant Kaur
- Ashish Duggal as Nawab Khan
- Anil Yadav as Bangladeshi
- Smeep Kang as Makhan Singh
- Girish Jain as Guppi
- Anand Mishra as Multani Baba
- Sachin Parikh as Jayesh
- Arun Kadam as Anna
- Jayant Das as Probir Chatterjee
- Girish Sahdev as Professor Girish
- Chandan Anand as Deep Singh
- Rana Jung Bahadur as Pakistani Police Officer
- Sambhavna Sheth (special appearance) as Dancer in a song

== Soundtrack ==
Kaafila

Soundtrack album by Sukhwinder Singh
- Released: July 7, 2007
- Length: 35:00
- Label: Pen Audio

The songs for the film were composed by Sukhwinder Singh and the lyrics were penned by Babu Singh Mann. The background score of the movie was done by Sanjoy Chowdhury.

No.	Title	Singer(s)	Length
1.	"Aayi Hai Hawa"	Sukhwinder Singh, Abhijeet Bhattacharya, Nabi Madjun	4:49
2.	"Chala Kaafila"	Shahaana Pandit	5:30
3.	"Hum Raks"	Sukhwinder Singh, Daler Mehndi	5:00
4.	"Hum Raks Mix"	Sukhwinder Singh, Daler Mehndi	5:26
5.	"Kabhi Kabhi Sapne"	Sukhwinder Singh, Abhijeet Bhattacharya, Mohammed Aziz, Gurusewak Mann	7:22
6.	"Lodhi Di Raat"	Dolly Sidhu, Abei	4:24
7.	"Hatho Mein Hath"	Sukhwinder Singh, Abhijeet Bhattacharya	2:57
Total length:			35:00
