= Kaun Kare Insaaf =

- Directed by: Baljit Singh
- Produced by: Avtar Singh Gill; Salinder Singh Salindra
- Starring: Varsha Choudhary; Lakha Lakhwinder Singh; Raj Dhaliwal
- Cinematography: Kamaldeep Singh
- Music by: Prince Sukhdev
- Production companies: Raj Mahal Production; Satluj Films
- Distributed by: Om Jee Group
- Release date: 25 September 2015
- Running time: 138 minutes
- Country: India
- Language: Punjabi

Kaun Kare Insaaf is a Punjabi directed by Baljit Singh and was released on 25 September 2015. The film is based on the 1984 Sikh genocide.

== Cast ==
- Varsha Choudhary
- Lakha Lakhwinder Singh
- Karan Sandhawalia
- Raj Dhaliwal
- Lakha Lehri
- Gurinder Makna
- Manjit Kala
- Girish
- Khushi
- Preet
- Elisha Shabdish
- Roopi Rupinder
- Balkar Singh
- Parminder Gill
