= 25 Kille =

2016 film directed by Simranjit Singh Hundal

- Directed by: Simranjit Singh Hundal
- Screenplay by: Harish Gargi; Surmeet Maavi
- Story by: Simranjit Singh Hundal
- Produced by: Shirin Morani; Ranjha Vikram Singh; Amanpreet Singh Sodhi
- Starring: Guggu Gill; Lakha Lakhwinder Singh; Yograj Singh; Jimmy Sharma; Sonia Mann; Ranjha Vikram Singh
- Edited by: Rohit Dhiman
- Music by: Jaidev Kumar
- Release date: 25 August 2016
- Running time: 140 minutes
- Country: India
- Language: Punjabi

25 Kille is a 2016 Punjabi drama film directed by Simranjit Singh Hundal and starring Guggu Gill, Yograj Singh, Ranjha Vikram Singh, Jimmy Sharma, Lakha Lakhwinder Singh, Sonia Mann, and Sapna Bassi.

Set for release on 25 August 2016, the film follows four Jatt brothers and their love and unity against the odds of mystery.

== Plot ==
The lives of four brothers change when they receive a letter from a chacha stating that they own an ancestral land of 25 kille which can be their own if they claim it. The land is in possession of Bachittar Singh and Santokh Singh, two brothers who are influential and ruthless feudal lords. How they get the land facing these two feudal lords and what they discover in the process forms the story.

== Cast ==
- Guggu Gill as Saudagar Singh
- Yograj Singh as Bachittar Singh Randhawa
- Lakha Lakhwinder Singh as Bhola
- Jimmy Sharma as Diljaan
- Ranjha Vikram Singh as Ransher/Gajjan Singh (Double role)
- Sonia Mann as Sonia
- Sapna Bassi as Sherry
- Hobby Dhaliwal as Santokh Singh Randhawa
- Prince Kj Singh as Bhinda
- Sardar Sohi as Kartar Singh Patwari
- Daljinder Basran as Sethi Advocate
- Sandeep Malhi as Advocate Navreet Kaur Dhillon
- Gurpreet Bhangu as Saudagar's Bhua (Village woman)
- Baljit Sidhu as Jung Randhawa
- Narinder Nina as Bachittar's father
- Rose J Kaur as Woman at Teeyan
- Aman Kotish
- Davinder Virk
- Sandeep Kaur Sandy as Bhabi
- Rajneet Kaur
- Sandeep Pateela
- Dilawar Sidhu

== Soundtrack ==
The Music Was Composed By Jaidev Kumar and Released by Saga Music.

25 Kille

Soundtrack album by Jaidev Kumar
- Released: 16 August 2016
- Recorded: 2016
- Genre: Soundtrack
- Length: 16:47
- Label: Saga Music
- Producer: Jaidev Kumar

Jaidev Kumar chronology
Chaar Sahibzaade: Rise of Banda Singh Bahadur (2016)	25 Kille (2016)	Wah Taj! (2016)

Track list
No.	Title	Lyrics	Singer(s)	Length
1.	"Wah Oye Rabba"	Babu Singh Maan	Feroz Khan, Gurjazz, Inderjit Nikku, Surinder Shinda	3:55
2.	"Door Ho Javanga"	Davinder Khannewala	Ustad Rahat Fateh Ali Khan, Jyotica Tangri	4:14
3.	"Zameen"	Happy Raikoti	Mika Singh, Surinder Shinda	4:52
4.	"Rabb Di Mehar"	Davinder Khannewala	Saanj, Shipra Goyal	3:46
Total length:				16:47
