= Gun & Goal =

- Directed by: Simranjit Singh Hundal
- Written by: Surmeet Mavi
- Produced by: Surinderjeet Singh Sarao
- Starring: Sumeet Sarao; Rishita Monga Sezal Sharma, Razia Sukhbir, Sandeepa Virk, Guggu Gill, Mukesh Tiwari, Surinder Shinda, Sardar Sohi, Sanjeev Attri, Rajveer Bawa
- Music by: Jaggi Singh, Onkar Singh, Vivek Kar
- Production company: Sarao Films
- Release date: 3 April 2015
- Country: India
- Language: Punjabi

Gun & Goal (2015) is a Punjabi sports drama film, directed by Simranjit Singh Hundal and starring Sumeet Singh Sarao, Sezal Sharma and Rishita Monga. The movie is based on the life of a football player.

== Cast ==
- Sumeet Singh Sarao
- Rishita Monga
- Sezal Sharma
- Sandeepa Virk
- Razia Sukhbir
- Mukesh Tiwari
- Guggu Gill
- Sardar Sohi
- Surinder Shinda
- Sanjeev Attri

== Soundtrack ==
Gun & Goal

Soundtrack album
- Released: 4 April 2015
- Genre: Feature film soundtrack
- Length: 17:10
- Label: Speed Records

The soundtrack was composed by Jaggi Singh, Onkar Singh, Vivek Kar and Santokh Singh.

No.	Title	Lyrics	Music	Singer(s)	Length
1.	"Zig Zag"	Kumaar	Vivek Kar	Meet Bros, Shipra Goyal	3:17
2.	"Ghatta Ghatt Kar Ke"	Rajveer Bawa	Jaggi Singh	Sonu Kakkar, Jaggi Singh	4:13
3.	"Bahan Goriyan"	Santokh Singh	Santokh Singh	Santokh Singh and Neha Kakkar	2:44
4.	"Mehboob"	Simranjit Singh Hundal	Onkar Singh	Shahid Mallya, Sarodee and Sarodee Borah	4:25
5.	"Sukke Patte"	Rajveer Bawa	Onkar Singh	Mohd. Irfan	3:11
Total length:					17:10
