= Mitti Na Pharol Jogiya =

- Directed by: Avtar Singh
- Written by: Avtar Singh
- Produced by: Ram Sidhu; Amrinder Laddi; Gurpreet Bab
- Starring: Japtej Singh; Amann Grewal; Lakha Lakhwinder Singh; Kartar Cheema
- Cinematography: Navneet Beohar
- Music by: Kannu Jimmy; Desi Crew
- Production companies: Ram Avtar Art Film; VIP Films & Entertainment
- Distributed by: Studio 7 Production; 360 Digitalz & Lokdhun
- Release date: 8 May 2015
- Countries: India; Pakistan
- Language: Punjabi

Mitti Na Pharol Jogiya (2015) is a Punjabi film based on a true story of 1947 Partition of India and showcases Indo-Pak harmony.

== Production ==
It is directed by Avtar Singh, Starring Kartar Chemma, Aman Grewal, and Japtej Singh in lead roles. The movie was produced under the banner of Ram Avtar Art Film.

== Cast ==
- Japtej Singh as Jagga
- Amann Grewal as
- Lakha Lakhwinder Singh as Lakha
- Kartar Cheema as Sucha Singh
- Rupinder Rupi
- Sanju Solanki
- Razia Sukhbir
- Damanpreet
- Navdeep Kaler

== Release ==
Mitti Na Farol Jogiya was released on 8 May 2015.

=== Home Media Release ===
The film is available on the Chaupal OTT platform for online streaming.
