= Lakeeran =

- Directed by: Bhupinder Sayan
- Produced by: Wonderland Productions
- Starring: Harman Virk; Yuvika Chaudhary; Shivendra Mahal; B.N. Sharma; Nirmal Rishi
- Cinematography: Nazir Khan; Anshul Chobey; João Monge
- Edited by: Biren Jyoti Mohanty
- Music by: Salil Amrute
- Production company: Wonderland Productions
- Release date: 21 October 2016
- Country: India
- Language: Punjabi

Lakeeran is a 2016 Punjabi film produced by Wonderland Amusement Parks Pvt. Ltd. It stars Harman Virk and Yuvika Chaudhary in lead roles with Gurinder Rai, Shivendra Mahal, B.N. Sharma and Nirmal Rishi in pivotal roles.

== Plot ==
The film revolves around a man who accidentally kills another man in Greece in a car accident. He comes to India where he falls in love with a widow, whose husband had met the same fate.

== Cast ==
- Harman Virk
- Yuvika Chaudhary
- Shivendra Mahal
- B.N. Sharma
- Nirmal Rishi
- Malkit Rauni
- Gurinder Rai
- Satwant Kaur

== Music ==
The music is given by Dr. Zeus, Santosh Kataria. There are 7 songs, including two short folk songs on the plight of destiny, composed by Arif Lohar. The songs are also sung by popular names like Zora Randhawa and Fateh for the modern audiences; while the traditional fans are catered with songs brought by Nachhatar Gill, Jaspinder Narula and Feroz Khan.

- "Sada Punjab" (Folk)
- "Viah" (Bolea)
- "Nima Nima"
- "Hok Tappa" – Arif Lohar
- "Wonderland"
- "Jindey Tappa"
- "Okay"
