= Karan Aujla discography =

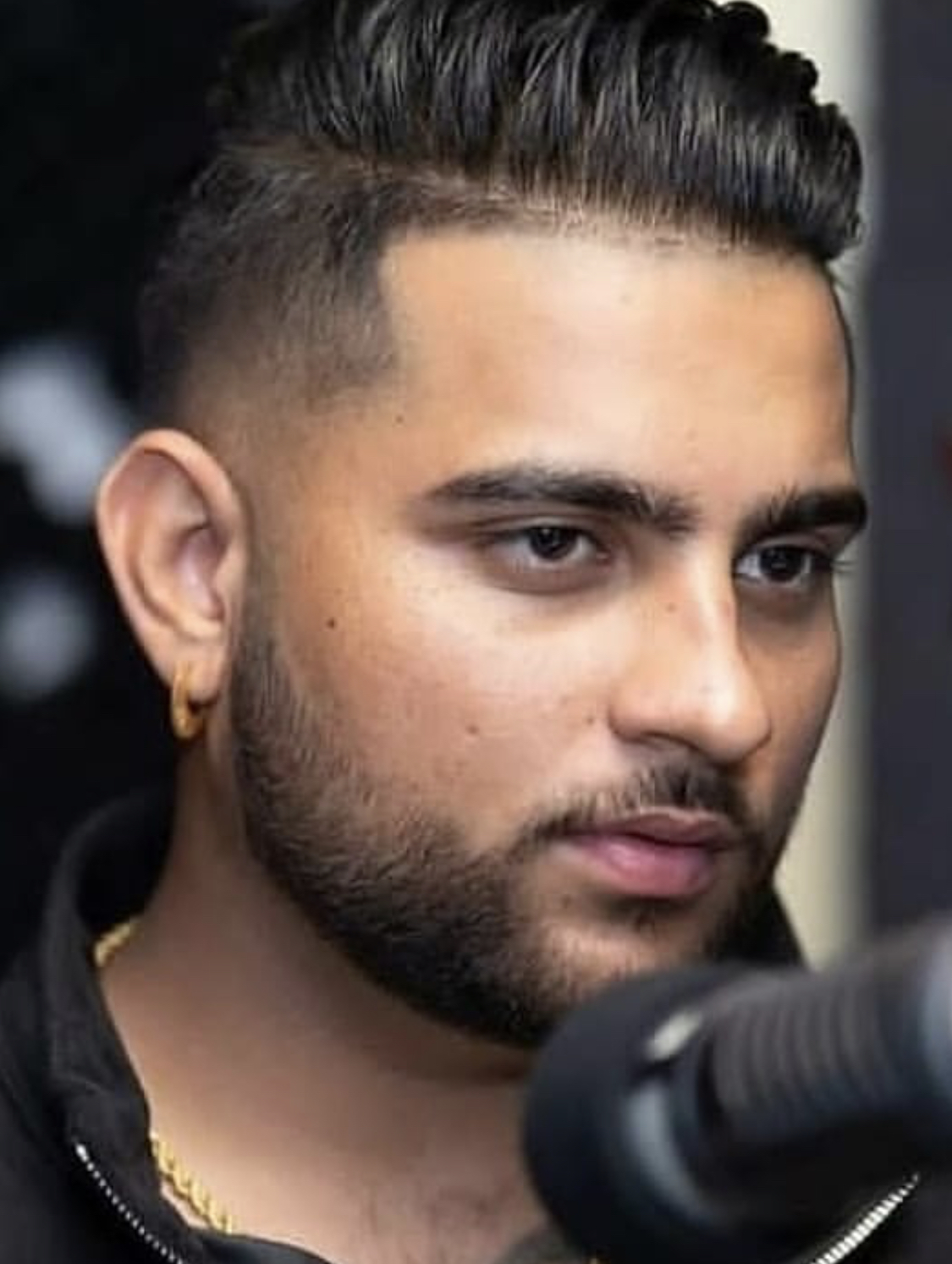
- Studio Albums: 4
- EPs: 4
- As lead artist: 59
- As featured artist: 54
- As songwriter: 35

Karan Aujla is an Indian singer, rapper, and songwriter in the Punjabi music industry. He has released over fifty-two singles as a lead artist and thirty-four as a songwriter. He has also featured on fifty-four songs as a guest artist. Eleven of his singles as a lead artist have been featured on the global YouTube music chart, while nineteen have been featured on the UK Asian music chart by the OCC.

== Albums ==
=== Studio albums ===
List of studio albums, with selected details and chart positions
Title	Album details	Peak chart positions					Certifications
Title	Album details	AUS	CAN	NZ	UK Digital	US World	Certifications
Bacthafucup	Released: 15 September 2021; Label: Times Music, Speed Records; Music: Tru Skool; Format: CD, digital download, streaming	—	20	34	25	—	
Making Memories (with Ikky)	Released: 18 August 2023; Music: Ikky; Label: Warner Music Canada, Warner Music India, Karan Aujla, Rehaan Records; Format: CD, digital download, streaming	—	5	14	80	—	MC: Platinum
Street Dreams (with Divine)	Released: 16 February 2024; Label: Mass Appeal India; Music: Yeah Proof, Jay Trak and Various.; Format: Digital download, streaming	—	22	27	—	—	
P-Pop Culture (with Ikky)	Released: 22 August 2025; Music: Ikky; Label: Warner Music Canada, Warner Music India, Karan Aujla, Rehaan Records; Format: CD, digital download, streaming	29	3	10	44	19	MC: Gold

== Extended plays ==
List of EPs, with selected details and chart positions
Title	EP details	Peak chart positions	
Title	EP details	CAN	NZ
Way Ahead	Released: 10 May 2022; Label: Rehaan Records; Music: Yeah Proof; Featured artists: YG, Ikka; Format: CD, digital download, streaming	36	—
Four You (with Ikky)	Released: 4 February 2023; Music: Ikky; Label: Karan Aujla; Format: Digital download, streaming	16	—
Four Me	Released: 26 June 2024; Music: Ikky, Yeah Proof, Kenny Beats; Label: Karan Aujla; Format: Digital download, streaming	—	—
Aujla SZN 1	Released: 25 September 2026; Music: Ikky, Mxrci; Featured artists: Azaad 4L; Label: Karan Aujla; Format: Digital download, streaming	7	8
"—" denotes a recording that did not chart or was not released in that territory.

== Singles ==
=== As lead artist ===
Title	Year	Music	Peak chart positions						Certifications	Label	Album
Title	Year	Music	CAN	NZ Hot	IND	UK Asian	UK Punjabi (OCC)	WW	Certifications	Label	Album
"Property of Punjab"	2016	Deep Jandu	—	—	—	—	—	—		Desi Beats Records	Non-album single
"Soch"	2016	Intense	—	—	—	—	—	—	MC: Gold	Intense Music	124 by Intense
"Black Money" (featuring Banka)	2017	Deep Jandu	—	—	—	—	—	—		Rehaan Production	Non-album single
"Weed" (featuring Deep Jandu & Elly Mangat)	2017	Harj Nagra	—	—	—	—	—	—		Game Killerz Records	Non-album single
"Dark Circle"	2017	Deep Jandu	—	—	—	—	—	—		Rehaan Records	Non-album single
"Shit Talk"	2017	Deep Jandu	—	—	—	—	—	—		Rehaan Records	Non-album single
"Yaarian Ch Fikk"	2017	Deep Jandu	—	—	—	—	—	—		Rehaan Records	Non-album single
"GolGappe Vs Daaru"	2017	Intense	—	—	—	—	—	—		Rehaan Records	Non-album single
"6 Bande"	2018	Harj Nagra	—	—	—	—	—	—		Rehaan Records	Non-album single
"Alcohol 2" (with Paul G)	2018	Harj Nagra	—	—	—	—	—	—		Rehaan Records	Non-album single
"Gun Shot"	2018	Deep Jandu	—	—	—	—	—	—		Rehaan Records	Non-album single
"Unity" (featuring Bohemia)	2018	Deep Jandu	—	—	—	—	—	—		Rehaan Records	Non-album single
"Weak Point"	2018	Deep Jandu	—	—	—	—	—	—		Rehaan Records	Non-album single
"Don't Worry" (featuring Gurlez Akhtar)	2018	Deep Jandu	—	—	—	36	—	—		Rehaan Records	Non-album single
"Rim vs Jhanjhar"	2018	Deep Jandu	—	—	—	—	—	—		Royal Music Gang	Non-album single
"Na Na Na"	2018	Deep Jandu	—	—	—	—	—	—		Rehaan Records	Non-album single
"Manja"	2019	Deep Jandu	—	—	—	—	—	—		Rehaan Records	Non-album single
"No Need"	2019	Deep Jandu	—	—	—	—	—	—		Rehaan Records	Non-album single
"Mafia" (feat. Karam Bajwa)	2019	Deep Jandu	—	—	—	—	—	—		Rehaan Records	Non-album single
"President"	2019	Deep Jandu	—	—	—	—	—	—		Rehaan Records	Non-album single
"Yaarian Ch Medal"	2019	Deep Jandu	—	—	—	—	—	—		Rehaan Records	Non-album single
"Don't Look"	2019	Jay Trak	—	—	—	14	—	—	MC: Gold	Rehaan Records	Non-album single
"Facts"	2019	Deep Jandu	—	—	—	—	—	—		Rehaan Records	Non-album single
"Hair"	2019	Deep Jandu	—	—	—	31	—	—		Rehaan Records	Non-album single
"Hisaab"	2019	Jay Trak	—	—	—	—	—	—		Royal Music Gang	New Kid on the Block by Jay Trak
"Scene" (with Deep Jandu feat. 6irds & SHV G)	2019	Jay Trak	—	—	—	—	—	—		Royal Music Gang	New Kid on the Block by Jay Trak
"Sikander"	2019	Deep Jandu • Manna Music	—	—	—	—	—	—		Geet Mp3	Sikander 2 soundtrack
"Koi Chakkar Nai"	2019	Deep Jandu	—	—	—	—	—	—		Rehaan Records	Non-album single
"2 AM" (feat. Roach Killa)	2019	Roach Killa	—	—	—	20	—	—		Rehaan Records	Non-album single
"Ink"	2019	J-Statik	—	—	—	28	—	—		Speed Records • Rehaan Records	Non-album single
"Hint"	2019	Jay Trak	—	—	—	13	5	—	MC: Gold	Rehaan Records	Non-album single
"Chitta Kurta" (feat. Gurlez Akhtar)	2019	Deep Jandu	—	—	—	20	—	—		Rehaan Records	Non-album single
"Deal"	2019	Manna Music	—	—	—	—	—	—		Royal Music Gang	Dreams by Manna Music
"Jhanjar"	2020	Desi Crew	—	—	—	9	5	—		Rehaan Records	Non-album single
"Red Eyes" (feat. Gurlez Akhtar)	2020	Yeah Proof	—	—	—	8	5	—		Speed Records	Non-album single
"Dream Gabru"	2020	Minister Music	—	—	—	—	—	—		Royal Music Gang	"Overdose" by Minister Music
"Sheikh"	2020	Manna Music	—	—	—	27	12	—		Rehaan Records	Non-album single
"Pray"	2020	Deep Jandu	—	—	—	—	—	—		Rehaan Records	Non-album single
"Let 'em Play"	2020	Yeah Proof	—	—	—	15	5	—		Rehaan Records	Non-album single
"So Far"	2020	J-Statik	—	—	—	5	3	—		Planet Recordz	Non-album single
"It's Okay God"	2020	Yeah Proof, Homeboy	—	—	—	—	—	—		Rehaan Records	Non-album single
"Haan Haige Aa" (feat. Gurlez Akhtar)	2020	Avvy Sra	—	—	—	16	9	—		Rehaan Records	Non-album single
"Kya Baat Aa"	2020	Desi Crew	—	—	—	9	7	—		Rehaan Records	Non-album single
"Koka vs Coca"	2020	Jay Track	—	—	—	—	—	—		Navrattan Music	Non-album single
"Adhiya"	2020	Yeah Proof	—	19	—	2	2	—	MC: Gold	Street Gang	Non-album single
"Chithiyaan"	2020	Desi Crew	—	—	—	2	2	—		Speed Records	Non-album single
"Hukam" (feat. Gianimane)	2021	Yeah Proof	—	15	—	4	4	—		Rehaan Records	Non-album single
"Mexico"	2021	Yeah Proof	—	—	—	10	4	—		Single Track Studios	Non-album single
"Chu Gon Do?" (feat. Satnam Singh 5 Rivers & Mad Yardies)	2021	Tru Skool	—	—	—	6	—	—		Speed Records	BacTHAfucUP
"Click That B Kickin It" (feat. Nave Sauve)	2021	Tru Skool	—	—	—	4	4	—		Speed Records	BacTHAfucUP
"Here & There"	2021	Tru Skool	—	—	—	10	7	—		Speed Records	BacTHAfucUP
"Addi Sunni"	2021	Tru Skool	—	—	24	14	—	—		Speed Records	BacTHAfucUP
"It Ain't Legal" (feat. Gurlez Akhtar)	2021	Tru Skool	—	—	—	19	10	—		Speed Records	BacTHAfucUP
"Ykwim" (with KR$NA, feat. Mehar Vaani)	2022	Yeah Proof	—	—	—	17	8	—		Rehaan Records	Non-album single
"Gangsta" (featuring YG)	2022	Yeah Proof	—	—	—	4	2	—	MC: Platinum	Rehaan Records	Way Ahead EP
"Oouuu"	2022	Yeah Proof	—	—	—	10	6	—		Rehaan Records	Way Ahead EP
"They Know"	2022	Yeah Proof	—	—	—	18	—	—		Rehaan Records	Way Ahead EP
"Game Over"	2022	Yeah Proof	—	—	—	31	13	—		Rehaan Records	Way Ahead EP
"Sheesha"	2022	J Statik	—	39	—	—	—	—		Karan Aujla Music	Non-album singles
"Laut Aana"	2022	Avvy Sra	—	—	—	—	—	—		Karan Aujla Music	Non-album singles
"On Top"	2022	Yeah Proof	88	5	16	6	6	—	MC: Gold	Karan Aujla Music	Non-album singles
"WYTB" (with Gurlez Akhtar)	2022	Yeah Proof	—	31	—	12	10	—		Rehaan Records	Non-album singles
"White Brown Black" (with Avvy Sra)	2022	Avvy Sra	—	—	—	3	1	—		Desi Melodies	Non-album singles
"Players" (with Badshah featuring Devika Badyal)	2022	Hiten Music	71	10	13	4	2	—	MC: Gold	Badshah	3:00 AM Sessions EP
"52 Bars" (with Ikky)	2023	Ikky	13	5	11	1	1	—	MC: Gold	Karan Aujla	Four You EP
"Take It Easy"	2023	Ikky	—	14	—	8	5	—		Karan Aujla	Four You EP
"Falling Apart"	2023	Ikky	—	32	—	—	14	—		Karan Aujla	Four You EP
"Yeah Naah"	2023	Ikky	—	19	—	16	8	—		Karan Aujla	Four You EP
"P.O.V (Point of View)" (with Yeah Proof)	2023	Yeah Proof	—	37	—	—	—	—		Karan Aujla	Non-album single
"Admirin' You" (featuring Preston Pablo)	2023	Ikky	29	28	—	10	5	—	MC: 2× Platinum	Karan Aujla	Making Memories
"Jee Ni Lagda"	2023	Ikky	—	—	20	16	6	—	MC: Platinum	Karan Aujla & Rehaan Records	Making Memories
"Try Me"	2023	Ikky	24	—	7	13	6	—	MC: Platinum	Karan Aujla & Rehaan Records	Making Memories
"Champion's Anthem"	2023	Ikky	—	—	18	—	14	—	MC: Platinum	Karan Aujla & Rehaan Records	Making Memories
"Softly"	2023	Ikky	76	11	5	3	2	—	MC: 2× Platinum	Karan Aujla & Rehaan Records	Making Memories
"Bachke Bachke" (with featuring Yarah)	2023	Ikky	—	—	19	26	13	—	MC: Platinum	Karan Aujla & Rehaan Records	Making Memories
"100 Million" (with Divine)	2024	Trox, Samarei	—	23	—	13	12	—		Mass Appeal India	Street Dreams
"Hisaab" (with Divine)	2024	Yeah Proof, Jay Trak	—	—	—	—	—	—		Mass Appeal India	Street Dreams
"Nothing Lasts" (with Divine)	2024	Umair, Rovalio	—	—	—	18	11	—		Mass Appeal India	Street Dreams
"Goin' Off"	2024	Mxrci	50	15	—	—	—	—			Non-album singles
"Winning Speech"	2024	Mxrci	—	7	—	—	—	—			Non-album singles
"On Top 2"	2024	Yeah Proof	—	—	—	—	—	—			Non-album singles
"Don't Look 2"	2024	G-Funk	—	—	—	—	—	—			Non-album singles
"IDK How"	2024	Ikky	—	18	—	3	3	—			For Me
"Tauba Tauba"	2024	Yeah Proof	25	8	1	—	14	68			Bad Newz
"Sifar Safar"	2024	Mxrci	—	11	—	—	—	—			Non-album singles
"Wavy"	2024	Jay Trak	7	2	10	—	—	—			Non-album singles
"Tell Me" (with One Republic)	2025	Ikky	54	—	—	—	—	—	MC: Gold		Non-album singles
"48 Rhymes"	2025	Manna Music	—	17	—	—	—	—	MC: Gold	Rehaan Records	Non-album singles
"Courtside"	2025	Signature by SB	28	10	15	—	—	—	MC: Platinum		Non-album singles
"At Peace"	2025	Ikky	8	11	12	—	—	—	MC: Platinum		Non-album singles
"MF Gabhru!"	2025	Ikky	46	8	—	—	—	—	MC: Platinum		P-Pop Culture
"For a Reason"	2025	Ikky	19	14	3	—	—	174	MC: Platinum	Rehaan Records	P-Pop Culture
"5–7"	2026	Mxrci	41	9	—	—	—	—		Rehaan Records	Non-album singles
"Top Fella"	2026	Mxrci	70	—	—	—	—	—			Non-album singles
"Low Fade"	2026	Mxrci	61	—	—	—	—	—			Non-album singles
"Ashke"	2026	Mxrci	13	5	9	—	—	—			Aujla SZN 1
"—" denotes a recording that did not chart or was not released in that territory.

=== As featured artist ===
Title	Year	Music	Peak chart positions				Label	Album
Title	Year	Music	CAN	NZ Hot	UK Asian (OCC)	UK Punjabi	Label	Album
"Cell Phone" (Mac Benipal feat. Karan Aujla)	2016	Jay R ▼	—	—	—	—	Rhythm Divine Records	
"Snitch" (Elly Mangat feat. Karan Aujla)	2017	Deep Jandu					Game Killerz	YEA Babby
Gunda Touch (Elly Mangat feat. Karan Aujla)	2017	Harj Nagra	—		—	—	Game Killerz	YEA Babby
Hummer (Elly Mangat feat. Deep Jandu & Karan Aujla)	2017	Harj Nagra ▼			—		Game Killerz	YEA Babby
"Alcohol" (Paul G feat. Karan Aujla)	2017	Harj Nagra					Rehaan Production	
"Scratch" (Gursewak Dhillon with Gurlez Akhtar feat. Karan Aujla)	2018	Deep Jandu	—	—	—	—	Rehaan Records	
"Approach" (Jovan Dhillon feat. Karan Aujla)	2018	Harj Nagra	—				Rehaan Records	
"Lafafe" (Sanam Bhullar feat. Karan Aujla)	2018	Mista Baaz ▼			—		Rehaan Records	
"By God" (Jayy Randhawa feat. Karan Aujla)	2018	MixSingh	—	—	—	—	TOB Gang	
"Tru Talk" (Jassie Gill feat. Karan Aujla)	2018	Sukhe	-	-	-	-	Speed Records	
"Squad Goals" (ATG Gucci feat. Karan Aujla)	2018	ATG BEATS	—	—	—	—	ATG Beats	
"Enough" (Gulab Sidhu feat. Karan Aujla)	2018	Dev Next Level ▼					Rehaan Records	
"Maybach" (J Swag feat. Karan Aujla)	2018	Dope Peppz					T-Series	
"Yaar Graribaaz" (Dilpreet Dhillon feat. Karan Aujla & Shree Brar)	2018	Desi Crew ▼					Saga Hits	
"Tension" (Nijjar feat. Karan Aujla)	2018	Deep Jandu	-	-	-	-	Rehaan Records	
"PCR" (Gurjas Sidhu feat. Karan Aujla)	2019	Turban Beats ▼					Single Track Studio	
"Expensive" (Binnie Ranu feat. Karan Aujla)	2019	YoungstarPop Boy					Rehaan Records	
"Snake" (Deep Jandu feat. Karan Aujla)	2019	Deep Jandu					Royal Music Gang	
"Supply" (Gurjas Sidhu feat. Karan Aujla)	2019	Deep Jandu					Single Track Studio	
"Gunday Hai Hum" (Dilpreet Dhillon feat. Karan Aujla)	2019	Deep Jandu	—	—	—	—	Rehaan Records	
"Doctor" (Penny feat. Karan Aujla)	2019	Deep Jandu ▼					Rehaan Records	
"Burn Out" (DJ Flow feat. Karan Aujla)	2019	DJ Flow					Single Track Studios	
"Vair" (Yaad feat. Karan Aujla)	2019	Deep Jandu					Royal Music Gang	
"Tibbeyan Ala Jatt" (Harf Cheema feat. Deep Jandu & Karan Aujla)	2019	Deep Jandu				—	Geet Mp3	
"No Dinero" (G Ranjha feat. Karan Aujla)	2019	Deep Jandu					Royal Music Gang	
"Kaim Life" (JP Randhawa feat. Karan Aujla)	2019	Deep Jandu					Rehaan Records	
"My Car" (Jay Trak and Deep Jandu feat. Karan Aujla)	2019	Jay Trak					Royal Music Gang	New Kid on the Block
"Love Hate" (Raj Dhillon feat. Karan Aujla)	2019	Deep Jandu	—	—	—	—	Rehaan Records	
"Red Light" (Deep Jandu feat. Gurlez Akhtar & Karan Aujla)	2019	Deep Jandu					Rehaan Records	
"Little Bit" (Jass Bajwa feat. Karan Aujla)	2019	Deep Jandu					Nupur Audio	
"12 AM to 12 PM" (Khan Bhaini feat. Karan Aujla)	2019	Syco Style ▼					Rehaan Records	
"Don't Tell Me" (Dilpreet Dhillon feat. Karan Aujla & Gurlez Akhtar)	2019	Desi Crew					Speed Records	
"Aukaat" (Deep Jandu feat. Karan Aujla)	2019	Deep Jandu					Royal Music Gang	
"Aukaat" (Jassie Gill feat. Karan Aujla)	2019	Desi Crew					Speed Records	
"Demand" (Kewal Bhullar feat. Karan Aujla)	2019	Deep Jandu					Rehaan Records	
"Yaar Yaar" (Manna Music and Deep Jandu feat. Karan Aujla)	2019	Manna Music					Royal Music Gang	Dreams
"My Name" (Deep Jandu feat. Gangis Khan & Karan Aujla)	2019	Deep Jandu					Geet Mp3	Down To Earth
"Mexico" (J Lucky feat. Karan Aujla)	2020	Deep Jandu					Royal Music Gang	
"Mind Games" (Vicky feat. Karan Aujla)	2020	Yeah Proof					Rehaan Records	
"Madam Ji" (Tushar feat. Karan Aujla)	2020	The Boss					Single Track Studio	
"Nanak Niva Jo Challe" (Bobby Sandhu feat. Karan Aujla)	2020	MXRCI ▼					Rehaan Records	
"Bar-Bar" (Navjot feat. Karan Aujla)	2020	Yeah Proof					Rehaan Records	
"Graribaaz" (Navjeet Kahlon feat. Karan Aujla)	2020	Deep Jandu					Arsara Music	
"Thaa Karke" (B Mohit feat. Karan Aujla)	2020	D Soldierz ▼					Rehaan Records	
"Ask 'Em" (Gippy Grewal feat. Karan Aujla)	2020	Yeah Proof					Geet Mp3	The Main Man
"Math" (Daljeet Cheema feat. Karan Aujla)	2020	Desi Crew					Rehaan Records	
"Don't Like" (Goldy feat. Karan Aujla)	2020	Desi Crew					Sony Music India	
"Ek Din" (Bohemia feat. The Game, Karan Aujla & J.Hind)	2020	Shaxe Oriah ▼	—	—	30		Saga Music	
"Guilty" (Inder Chahal feat. Karan Aujla)	2021	Yeah Proof					Savage Rechords	
"Jatt Te Jawani" (Dilpreet Dhillon feat. Karan Aujla)	2021	Desi Crew ▼	78	32	4	2	Speed Records	Next Chapter
"Few Days" (Amantej Hundal feat. Karan Aujla)	2021	Yeah Proof			17	9	Rehaan Records	
"She on It" (Ezu feat. Karan Aujla)	2021	Ezu ▼					Vip Records	En Route
"Bas" (Jaz Dhami feat. Karan Aujla)	2022	Yeah Proof	—	—	10		Jaz Dhami	
"Dream" (Inder Chahal feat. Karan Aujla)	2022	Yeah Proof					Savage Rechords	
"Ok Report" (DJ Flow feat. Karan Aujla)	2022	DJ Flow					DJ Flow	
"God Damn" (Badshah featuring Karan Aujla)	2024	Hiten						Ek Tha Raja
"House of Lies" (Ikka featuring Karan Aujla)	2024	Sanjoy						Only Love Gets Reply

Aujla also credited as songwriter for lead artist, except where mentioned ▼.

== Other charted and certified songs ==
Title	Year	Peak chart positions				Certifications	Album
Title	Year	CAN	NZ Hot	UK Asian	UK Punjabi	Certifications	Album
"Boli"	2021	—	—	27	16		Bacthafucup
"Unreachable" (featuring Ikka)	2022	—	—	—	14		Way Ahead
"You"	2023	—	—	—	20		Making Memories
"What?"	2023	—	—	—	10		Making Memories
"Top Class / Overseas" (with Divine)	2024	—	22	17	10		Street Dreams
"Straight Ballin'" (with Divine)	2024	—	28	—	16		Street Dreams
"Yaad" (with Divine featuring Jonita Gandhi)	2024	—	—	27	14		Street Dreams
"Tareefan" (with Divine)	2024	—	24	21	12		Street Dreams
"Who They?" (with Yeah Proof)	2024	—	16	10	6		Four Me
"Antidote"	2024	—	21	—	7		Four Me
"Y.D.G" (with Yeah Proof)	2024	—	26	—	8		Four Me
"I Really Do..." (with Ikky)	2025	—	19	—	—	MC: Platinum	P-Pop Culture
"Daytona" (with Ikky)	2025	—	11	—	—	MC: Gold	P-Pop Culture
"7.7 Magnitude" (with Ikky)	2025	—	20	—	—	MC: Gold	P-Pop Culture
"Real Bad Man"	2026	36	11	—	—		Aujla SZN 1
"Straight Up" (with Mxrci)	2026	28	9	—	—		Aujla SZN 1
"Rap Killa" (with Mxrci featuring Azaad 4L)	2026	38	—	—	—		Aujla SZN 1
"Aujla SZN" (with Mxrci)	2026	27	7	—	—		Aujla SZN 1

== Soundtrack contribution ==
Year	Film	Title	Music	Label
2019	Sikander 2	"Sikander"	Deep Jandu, Manna Music	Geet Mp3
2024	Bad Newz	"Tauba Tauba"	Karan Aujla, Yeah Proof	Saregama
2025	The Ba***ds of Bollywood	"Movie Scene"	Shashwat Sachdev, Karan Aujla	T-Series
2025	De De Pyaar De 2	"3 Shaukk"	Avvy Sra, DJ Chetas	T-Series

== Songwriting discography ==
As lyricist (songwriter)
Song	Year	Artist	Label	Music	Album	Additional songwriters
"Range"	2014	Jassi Gill	Speed Records	Preet Hundal	Replay- Return of Melody	
"Blessings of Baapu"	2015	Gagan Kokri	Speed Records	Laddi Gill		
Jimidaar Jattian	2016	Gagan Kokri	T-Series	Preet Hundal		
Yes Or No	2016	Elly Mangat			Game Killerz	
"Trendster"	2016	Jazzy B featuring Genghis Khan	Speed Records	Deep Jandu		Gangis Khan
OG (Original Gangland)	2017	Elly Mangat	Game Killerz	V Grooves	YEA Babby	Harf Cheema
Daku	2017	Elly Mangat	Game Killerz	Deep Jandu	YEA Babby	
"Gangster Scene"	2017	Gursewak Dhillon, Deep Jandu	Boombox Music	Deep Jandu		
"Kabza"	2017	Gagan Tung	Rehaan Production	Deep Jandu		
"Come Here" (featuring Dj K Square)	2017	Yashvi, Gangis Khan	Royal Music Gang	Deep Jandu		
"Cruising"	2017	Amantej Hundal	Game Killerz Records	Deep Jandu		
"Rule"	2017	Karn Sekhon	Amar Audio	Mr. VGROOVES		
"Dhakad"	2017	Gagan Tung	Rehaan Records	Harj Nagra		
"90 Di Bandook"	2018	Jazzy B	Jazzy B Records	Harj Nagra		
"Underestimate"	2018	Geeta Zaildar	Royal Music Gang	Deep Jandu		
"Stand"	2018	Lavi Jandali	Rehaan Records	Deep Jandu		
"Questions"	2018	Bal E Lasara	Royal Music Gang	Deep Jandu		
"Vaaj"	2018	Deep Jandu featuring Kanwar Grewal	Royal Music Gang	Deep Jandu		Kanwar Grewal
"Priority"	2018	Deep Kalsi	Rehaan Records	Deep Jandu		
"Blonde Baal" (featuring Fateh)	2018	Joti Dhillon	Royal Music Gang	Deep Jandu		
"Water"	2018	J Lucky	Royal Music Gang	Deep Jandu		
"Bukkal"	2018	Karam Bajwa	Defender Squad	Deep Jandu		
"No Entry"	2019	Sunny Patwalia	Royal Music Gang	Deep Jandu		
"Nature"	2019	Jayy Randhawa	TOB Gang	Gupz Shehra		
"Break Yaarian"	2019	J Lucky	Royal Music Gang	Deep Jandu		
"Tere Bina Yaara"	2019	Sukshinder Shinda	Sukshinder Shinda	Sukshinder Shinda		
"Khulla Sher"	2019	J Lucky	Royal Music Gang	Deep Jandu		
"Long Life"	2019	Harpreet Dhillon	Planet Recordz	Deep Jandu		
"Goli"	2019	Labh Heera	Royal Music Gang	Deep Jandu		Harf Cheema
"Akhan Terian Ch Roab"	2019	Puneet Riar		Deep Jandu		
"Simplicity"	2019	G Money	G Money Musik	J Stalik		
"Bombay to Punjab"	2019	Deep Jandu & DIVINE	Geet Mp3	Deep Jandu	Down to Earth	DIVINE
"Real Ustaad"	2019	Deep Jandu & Miss Pooja	Geet Mp3	Deep Jandu	Down to Earth	
"Chill"	2020	Krishna & Deep Jandu	Royal Music Gang	Deep Jandu		
"Committed"	2020	Naman Dhillon & Gurlez Akhtar	Royal Music Gang	Deep Jandu		
"G.O.A.T."	2020	Diljit Dosanjh	Famous Studios	G-Funk	G.O.A.T	
"Silent Mind"	2020	Jayvee	Hope Records	Gill Saab		
"Hard to Get"	2021	Subaig Singh	Mahaveer Records	Deep Jandu		
"That's It"	2021	Vicky, Simar Kaur	Rehaan Records	Yeah Proof		
"Varat"	2021	Deep Khosa, Mr Dhatt	Rehaan Records	Yeah Proof		
"Tasali"	2022	Vicky	Rehaan Records	Yeah Proof	Back Stage to Front Stage	

== Music videos ==
Title	Year	Video director(s)	Album
"Property of Punjab"	2016	Sukh Sanghera	
"Soch" (with Intense)	2016	Harman Aujla	124
"Black Money” (feat. Banka)	2017	Prism Media	
"Weed" (feat. Deep Jandu & Elly Mangat)	2017	Harry Chahal	
"Dark Circle"	2017	Sukh Sanghera	
"Shit Talk"	2017	Rupan Bal	
"Yaarian Ch Fikk"	2017	Sukh Sanghera	
Alcohol 2 (with Paul G)	2018		
"Gun Shot"	2018	Mani Sandhu, Joban Sandhu	
"Unity" (feat. Bohemia)	2018	Rupan Bal	
"Don't Worry" (feat. Gurlez Akhtar)	2018	Sukh Sanghera	
"Rim vs Jhanjhar"	2018	Sukh Sanghera	
"Na Na Na"	2018	Rupan Bal	
"No Need"	2019	Rupan Bal	
"Don't Look"	2019	Rupan Bal & Rubbal GTR	
"Facts"	2019	Mahi Sandhu, Joban Sandhu	
"Hair"	2019	Sukh Sanghera	
"Hisaab"	2019	Director whiz	New Kid on the Block
"Scene" (with Deep Jandu feat. 6irds & SHV G)	2019	Minister Music	New Kid on the Block
"Sikander"	2019	Manav Shah	Sikander 2 (soundtrack)
"Koi Chakkar Nai"	2019	Minister Music	
"2 AM" (feat. Roach Killa)	2019	Rupan Bal & Rubbal GTR	
"Ink"	2019	Rupan Bal & Rubbal GTR	
"Hint"	2019	Rupan Bal & Rubbal GTR	
"Chitta Kurta" (feat. Gurlez Akhtar)	2019	Sukh Sanghera	
"Jhanjar"	2020	Tru Makers	
"Red Eyes" (feat. Gurlez Akhtar)	2020	Jeona & Jogi	
"Sheikh"	2020	Rupan Bal	
"Let 'em Play"	2020	Sukh Sanghera	
"So Far"	2020	Archery Club	
"It's Okay God"	2020	Rupan Bal	
"Haan Haige Aa" (feat. Gurlez Akhtar)	2020	Rupan Bal & Sagar Deol	
"Kya Baat Aa"	2020	Sukh Sanghera	
"Koka vs Coca"	2020	Sagar Deol	
"Adhiya"	2020	Mahi Sandhu/ Joban Sandhu	
"Chithiyaan"	2020	Rupan Bal	
"Hukam" (featuring Gianimane)	2021	Sagar Deol	
"Mexico"	2021	Agam & Azeem Maan	
"Chu Gon Do?" (feat. Satnam Singh 5 Rivers & Mad Yardies)	2021	Rupan Bal	BacTHAfucUP
"Click That B Kickin It" (feat. Nave Sauve)	2021	Rupan Bal	BacTHAfucUP
"Here & There"	2021	Rupan Bal	BacTHAfucUP
"Addi Sunni"	2021	Rupan Bal	BacTHAfucUP
"It Ain't Legal" (feat. Gurlez Akhtar)	2021	Rupan Bal	BacTHAfucUP
"Ask About Me"		Rupan Bal	BacTHAfucUP
"Ykwim" (with KR$NA, feat. Mehar Vaani)	2022	Rupan Bal	
"Gangsta" (featuring YG)	2022	Rupan Bal	Way Ahead
"Game Over"	2022	Rupan Bal	Way Ahead
"Oouuu"	2022	Rupan Bal	Way Ahead
"Sheesha"	2022	Sagar Deol	
"Laut Aana"	2022	Amanninder Singh	
"On Top"	2022	Qarn Malhi	
"WYTB" (feat. Gurlez Akhtar)	2022	Qarn Malhi	
"52 Bars "	2023	Amrit Thind	Four You
"Take It Easy "	2023	Qarn Malhi	Four You
"Fallin Apart "	2023	Qarn Malhi	Four You
"Yeah Naah "	2023	Qarn Malhi	Four You
"Admirin' You"	2023	Rupan Bal	Making Memories
"Try Me"	2023	Amrit Thind	Making Memories
"Jee Ni Lagda"	2023	Rupan Bal	Making Memories
"Softly"	2023	Qarn Mallhi	Making Memories
"Bachke Bachke"	2023	Qarn Mallhi	Making Memories
"Champion's Anthem"	2023	Amrit Thind	Making Memories
"100 Million" (with Divine)	2024	Rupan Bal	Street Dreams
"Hisaab" (with Divine)	2024	Debjyoti Saha	Street Dreams
"Nothing Lasts" (with Divine)	2024	Joel D'souza	Street Dreams
"Goin Off"	2024	Boota Singh	
"Winning Speech"	2024	Qarn Mallhi	
"IDK How"	2024	Qarn Mallhi	Four Me
"Sifar Safar"	2024	Qarn Mallhi	
"Wavy"	2024	Qarn Mallhi	
