= Ikky =

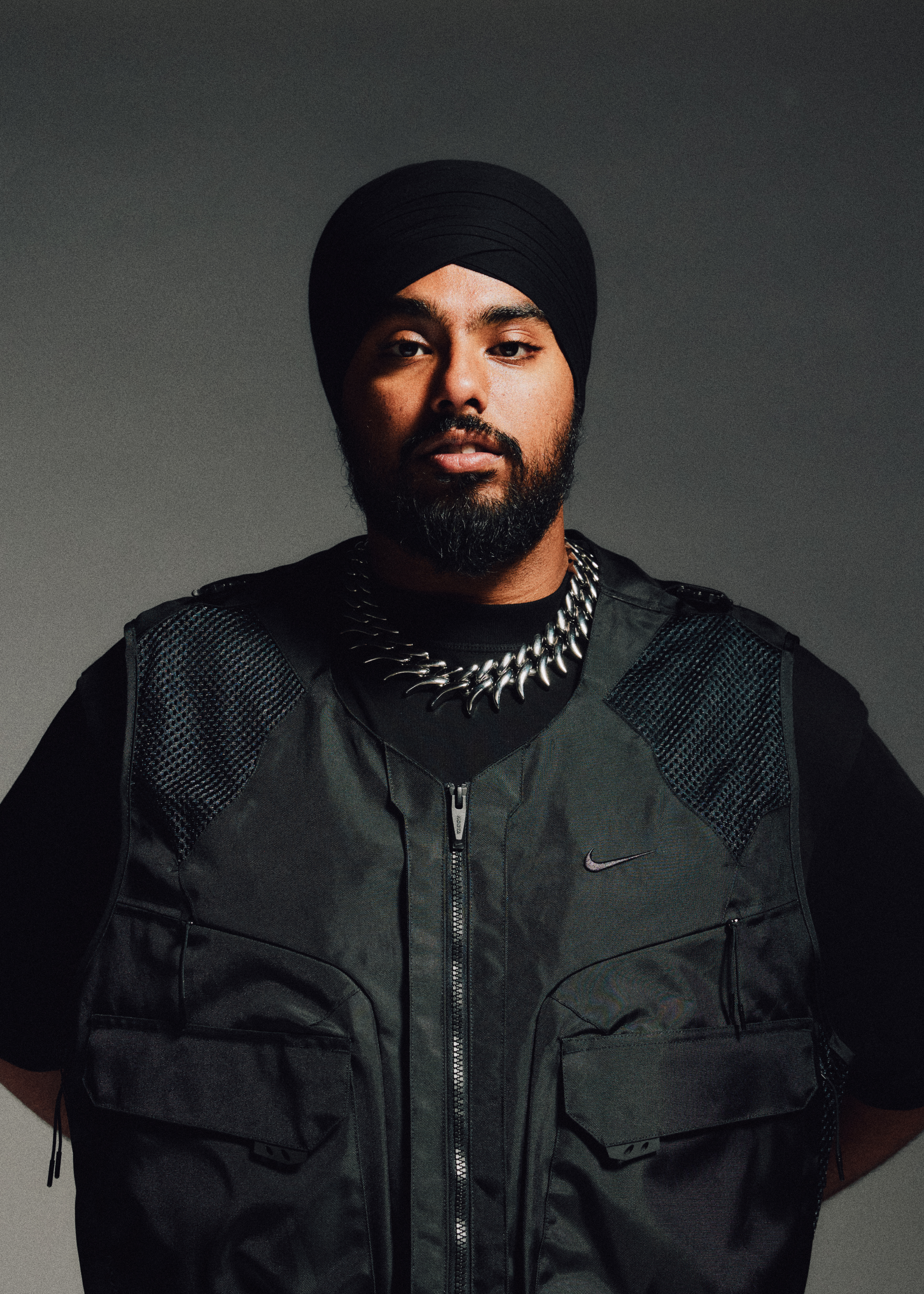
- Ikky in 2025

Background information
- Also known as: Man Like Ikky
- Born: Ikwinder Singh Sahota; 2000 (age 25–26); Toronto, Ontario, Canada
- Genres: Hip-hop, Pop
- Occupations: Record producer, record executive
- Years active: 2017–present
- Label: 4N Records

Ikwinder Singh Sahota (born 2000), known professionally as Ikky, is a Canadian musician and record producer associated with Punjabi music. He has produced for a variety of artists notably Tory Lanez, OneRepublic, Diljit Dosanjh, Sidhu Moose Wala, Shubh, Karan Aujla, Amrit Maan, Veet Baljit, Gurnam Bhullar, Himmat Sandhu, Garry Sandhu, Ammy Virk and Raf-Saperra among others.

His singles "Baller" with Shubh and "Chauffeur" with Diljit Dosanjh and Tory Lanez charted on the Canadian Hot 100. His EP Four You with Karan Aujla peaked at No. 16 on the Billboard Canadian Albums Chart.

== Early life ==
Ikwinder Singh Sahota was born in 2000 in the Rexdale neighborhood of Toronto, Ontario to Indian Sikh immigrants from India. His father was a writer in India before he decided to come to Canada He has one brother Sangtar who has a substantial following on social media, he is an actor and a self-described comedian. Ikky describes Jazzy B and Sukshinder Shinda as his biggest inspirations.

== Career ==
=== 2017-2020: Early beginnings and rise to fame ===
Ikky's first production credit appeared in 2017 on the song "Ford" by Aman Yaar, which was released by Jamifi Studios. He produced music for singles like "Bhangra Boliyan" by Prabh Saini, "Picka" by Veet Baljit, and the commercially successful "Diamond" by Gurnam Bhullar.

In 2018, he released "Yeah Baby", sung by Garry Sandhu and "Kamli", sung by Mankirt Aulakh.

In 2020, he worked with Punjabi artists Sidhu Moose Wala and Diljit Dosanjh for the song "Bambiha Bole" and the song "Akh Laal Jatt Di", respectively, the latter of which was released as a part of his eleventh studio album, G.O.A.T..

=== 2021-present: 4N Records and frequent collaborations with Karan Aujla ===
In 2021, Ikky launched his own label, 4N Records (pronounced foreign), a partnership with Warner Music India/Warner Music Canada and Coalition Music. "80 90" was the first release on the label, and featured Amrit Maan and Garry Sandhu in the spring of 2021. This release was followed by "Koi Na" with Nseeb, the lead single from the EP titled Say My Name.

In 2022, he released "Magical Love" and "Ranjhe". Ikky teamed up with Diljit Dosanjh and Tory Lanez on the release of "Chauffeur". His Spotify Singles were released later that year with a new version of "80 90" (Garry Sandhu) and a cover of "Ain't No Sunshine" featuring Himmat Sandhu and Preston Pablo. In the summer of 2022, Ikky released a song posthumously with Soni Pabla called "She's The One". The track used a demo that the singer had created before his death in 2006. Ikky continued releasing tracks in 2022, including "Baller" by Shubh and "Hello Hello Hola" by Las Villa featuring Garry Sandhu, MC Davo.

In February 2023, Ikky released an EP in collaboration with Karan Aujla titled Four You, preceded by the lead single "52 Bars". In March 2023, he collaborated with Bhalwaan, and released the track "On God (Freestyle)", produced by him. In June 2023, Ikky announced "4N Nights: Toronto" occurring at TD Music Hall at Massey Hall in Toronto. The series showcased 3-4 guest performances per show with additional surprise special guests. In August 2023, he released "Admirin' You" with Karan Aujla featuring Preston Pablo as the lead single for Karan's Making Memories album, which was also produced by him. In November 2023, he announced his Man Like Ikky Tour.

In February 2024, Ikky released his electronic/house EP Ikky's House. In April 2024, Ikky announced the US leg of his Man Like Ikky Tour.

In February 2025, Ikky along with Karan Aujla collaborated with OneRepublic for the song "Tell Me", which was accompanied by a music video featuring Indian actress Disha Patani. Few months later, Aujla announced his third studio album, P-Pop Culture, during his concert in Montreal, Canada on July 26, which was followed by a teaser release on YouTube, ahead of the release of the album's lead single, "MF Gabhru", on August 1. The album, produced entirely by Ikky, like Aujla's previous album, released as a double album on August 22, 2025, with five tracks on the first disc and six tracks on the second.

== Discography ==
=== Albums ===
List of albums, with selected details and peak chart positions
Title	Album details	Peak chart positions			
Title	Album details	AUS	CAN	NZ	UK Digital
Making Memories (with Karan Aujla)	Released: 18 August 2023; Label: Warner Music; Format: Digital download, streaming	—	5	14	80
P-Pop Culture (with Karan Aujla)	Released: 22 August 2025; Label: Warner Music; Format: Digital download, streaming	29	—	10	—

=== Extended plays ===
List of EPs, with selected details and chart positions
Title	EP details	Peak chart positions
Title	EP details	CAN
Say My Name (with Nseeb)	Released: 13 August 2021; Label: 4N Records; Format: Digital download, Streaming	—
Four You (with Karan Aujla)	Released: 4 February 2023; Label: Rehaan Records; Format: Digital download, Streaming	16
Ikky's House	Released: 23 February 2024; Label: 4N Records; Format: Digital download, Streaming	_

=== Singles ===
==== As lead artist ====
Title	Year	Peak chart position					Label	Album
Title	Year	CAN	NZ Hot	IND	UK Asian	UK Punjabi	Label	Album
"80 90" (with Amrit Maan & Garry Sandhu)	2021	—	—	—	16	11	4N Records	Non-album single
"Koi Na" (with Nseeb)	2021	—	—	—	—	—	4N Records	Say My Name
"Magical Love"	2022	—	—	—	—	—	4N Records	Non-album singles
"Ranjhé"	2022	—	—	—	—	—	4N Records	Non-album singles
"Chauffeur" (with Diljit Dosanjh & Tory Lanez)	2022	32	8	—	3	1	Warner Music	Non-album singles
"80 90" (with Garry Sandhu)	2022	—	—	—	—	—	4N Records	Non-album singles
"Ain't No Sunshine" (with Himmat Sandhu & Preston Pablo)	2022	—	—	—	—	—	4N Records	Non-album singles
"She's the One" (with Soni Pabla)	2022	—	—	—	—	—	4N Records	Non-album singles
"Baller" (with Shubh)	2022	68	10	11	2	1	Shubh	Non-album singles
"Hello Hello Hola" (with Garry Sandhu, Las Villa & MC Davo)	2022	—	—	—	—	—	4N Records	Non-album singles
"52 Bars" (with Karan Aujla)	2023	13	5	11	1	1	Karan Aujla	Four You
"Take It Easy" (with Karan Aujla)	2023	—	14	—	8	5	Karan Aujla	Four You
"Falling Apart" (with Karan Aujla)	2023	—	32	—	—	14	Karan Aujla	Four You
"Yeah Naah" (with Karan Aujla)	2023	—	19	—	16	8	Karan Aujla	Four You
"On God (Freestyle)" (with Bhalwaan)	2023	—	—	—	—	—	Bhalwaan & 4N Records	Non-album singles
"Challa" (with Gurdas Maan & Diljit Dosanjh)	2023	—	—	—	—	—	4N Records	Non-album singles
"Admirin' You" (with Karan Aujla featuring Preston Pablo)	2023	—	—	—	10	5	Karan Aujla	Making Memories
"Kamle" (with Gurnazar & Lavi Tibbi)	2023	—	—	—	—	—	Universal Music India Pvt. Ltd.	Non-album singles
"Ishq Hua (Love Happened)"	2024	—	—	—	—	—	4N Records	Non-album singles
"Poonian" (with Himmat Sandhu)	2024	—	—	—	—	—	Himmat Sandhu	Non-album singles
"Heartless" (with Jay Sean)	2024	—	—	—	—	—	3AM Ent.	Non-album singles
"Tell Me" (with Karan Aujla & OneRepublic)	2025	54	—	—	—	—	Karan Aujla	Non-album singles

== Production discography ==
List of tracks only credited as music producer
Title	Year	Artist(s)	Album
"Ford"	2017	Aman Yaar	Non-album singles
"Bhagra Boliyan"	2018	Prabh Saini	Non-album singles
"Pikka"	2018	Veet Baljit	Non-album singles
"Diamond"	2018	Gurnam Bhullar	Non-album singles
'"Yeah Baby"	2018	Garry Sandhu	Non-album singles
"Difference"	2018	Amrit Maan	Non-album singles
"Pariyan Ton Sohni"	2018	Amrit Maan	Non-album singles
"Kamli"	2018	Mankirt Aulakh	Non-album singles
"Wallah"	2020	Garry Sandhu	Non-album singles
"Bambiha Bole"	2020	Sidhu Moose Wala & Amrit Maan	Non-album singles
"Akh Laal Jatt Di"	2020	Diljit Dosanjh	G.O.A.T.
"Asi Oh Hunne Aa"	2020	Amrit Maan	Non-album single
"2 Seater"	2020	Gippy Grewal & Afsana Khan	The Main Man
"Gun Te Gulab"	2020	Gippy Grewal	The Main Man
"Piche Piche"	2020	Gippy Grewal, Bohemia	The Main Man
"Ayen Kiven"	2020	Gippy Grewal, Amrit Maan	The Main Man
"22-22"	2020	Gulab Sidhu, Sidhu Moose Wala	Non-album single
"All Bamb"	2021	Amrit Maan, Gurlez Akhtar	All Bamb
"Kaala Ghoda"	2021	Amrit Maan, Divine	All Bamb
"Softly"-Tiësto Remix	2023	Karan Aujla, Tiesto	Non-album singles
