= P-Pop Culture =

2025 album by Karan Aujla

Studio album by Karan Aujla and Ikky
- Released: 22 August 2025
- Recorded: 2023–2025
- Genre: Pop
- Length: 34:26
- Language: Punjabi
- Labels: Warner Canada; Warner India
- Producers: Euro; Ikky; Milano; Sandor Schwisberg; Stuckey

Karan Aujla chronology
Street Dreams (2024)	P-Pop Culture (2025)

P-Pop Culture is the third studio album by singer-songwriter Karan Aujla in collaboration with Canadian producer Ikky which was released on 22 August 2025. The album has eleven tracks, split into 2 discs by an interlude, and was released under exclusive license to Warner Music Canada and Warner Music India.

== Background ==
In 2025, Aujla announced his third studio album, P-Pop Culture, during his concert in Montreal, Canada on July 26, which was followed by a teaser release on YouTube, ahead of the release of the album's lead single, "MF Gabhru", on August 1.

== Release ==
The album released on August 22, 2025. The album debuted at No. 1 on Spotify in both India and Pakistan, and No. 4 in Canada, while also taking the No. 1 spot on Apple Music in all three countries. Upon release, all 11 songs on the album entered the Spotify Top 200 and Apple Music Top 50 charts in India, Canada, and Pakistan. In Canada, the project debuted at No. 3 on the Billboard Canadian Album charts with 12.4 million streams, marking the highest debut for a Punjabi-language album in Canadian history, a record that surpasses Aujla's second album Making Memories from 2023. In the United States, the album debuted at the No. 19 position on the US Billboard World Albums chart.

== Track listing ==
Disc 1
No.	Title	Writer(s)	Producer(s)	Length
1.	"I Really Do..."	Ikwinder Sahota; Jamal Europe; Khushi Kakkar; Elly Mangat; Ankush Raja	Ikky; Euro	3:13
2.	"For a Reason"	Sahota; Milan D'Agostini; Kakkar; Mangat; Raja	Ikky; Milano	3:00
3.	"You're You Tho"	Sahota; D'Agostini; Kakkar; Mangat; Raja	Ikky; Milano	3:03
4.	"Boyfriend"	Sahota; D'Agostini; Kakkar; Mangat; Raja	Ikky; Milano	2:40
5.	"Him."	Sahota; D'Agostini; Europe; Kakkar; Mangat; Raja	Ikky; Euro; Milano	3:11
Total length:				15:07

Disc 2
No.	Title	Writer(s)	Producer(s)	Length
1.	"Flip-Side (Sandy's Interlude)"	Sahota; Dawson Pablo; Sandor Schwisberg	Ikky; Schwisberg	1:53
2.	"I'ma Do My Thiiing"	Sahota; D'Agostini; Kakkar; Mangat; Raja; Schwisberg	Ikky; Schwisberg	3:13
3.	"Daytona"	Sahota; Kirk Grange; Kakkar; Mangat; Raja; Zachary Stuckey	Ikky	3:13
4.	"7.7 Magnitude"	Sahota; Kakkar; Mangat; Raja; Schwisberg	Ikky; Schwisberg	4:03
5.	"MF Gabhru!"	Sahota; Charanjit Ahuja; Kakkar; Mangat; Raja; Sahib Saabi; Stuckey	Ikky; Stuckey	3:20
6.	"P-Pop Culture"	Sahota; D'Agostini; Europe; Kakkar; Mangat; Raja; Stuckey	Ikky; Euro; Milano	3:31
Total length:				19:13

== Personnel ==
Credits adapted from Tidal.

=== Disc 1 ===
- Karan Aujla – lead vocals
- Ikwinder Sahota – drums, programming, engineering (all tracks); synthesizer (tracks 1, 4, 5), mixing (1), bass (4)
- Ankush Raja – vocals
- Elly Mangat –vocals
- Khushi Kakkar – vocals
- Chris Gehringer – mastering
- Jamal Europe – bass, synthesizer (1, 5); electric guitar, electric piano (5)
- Milan D'Agostini – guitar, synthesizer (2–5); bass, programming (2–4); backing vocals (2, 3), mixing (2, 5), drums (3, 5), keyboards (5)
- Josh Gudwin – mixing (3, 4)

=== Disc 2 ===
- Karan Aujla – lead vocals
- Ikwinder Sahota – drums, programming, engineering (all tracks); bass (1–5), mixing (1–4, 6)
- Chris Gehringer – mastering
- Ankush Raja – programming (1), vocals (2–6)
- Elly Mangat – programming (1), vocals (2–6)
- Khushi Kakkar – programming (1), vocals (2–6)
- Sandor Schwisberg – keyboards (1), synthesizer (1, 2, 4)
- Dawson Pablo – vocals (1)
- Milan D'Agostini – guitar (2, 6), synthesizer (6)
- Zachary Stuckey – guitar (3, 5)
- Kirk Grange – piano, synthesizer (3)
- Eric Ratz – mixing (5)
- Jamal Europe – synthesizer (6)

== Charts ==
Chart performance for P-Pop Culture
Chart (2025)	Peak position
Australian Albums (ARIA)	29
Australian Hip Hop/R&B Albums (ARIA)	2
Canadian Albums (Billboard)	3
New Zealand Albums (RMNZ)	10
UK Album Downloads (Official Charts)	44
US World Albums (Billboard)	19

== Certifications ==
Certifications for P-Pop Culture
Region	Certification	Certified units/sales
Canada (Music Canada)	Gold	40,000^{‡}
^{‡} Sales+streaming figures based on certification alone.
