= Shit Talk =

Shit talk is another term for trash talk.

Shit Talk may refer to:

- "Shit Talk" (Sufjan Stevens song), from the 2023 album Javelin
- "Shit Talk" (American Vandal), a 2018 television episode
- "Shit Talk", a 2017 single by Karan Aujla
- "Shit Talk", a 2019 single by Sworn In
