= Juno Fan Choice Award =

Canadian music award

The Juno Fan Choice Award is an annual Juno Award presented since 2003 by the Canadian Academy of Recording Arts and Sciences (CARAS) to the favourite artist or group of the year as voted by Canadian music fans. This is the only award that the winner is chosen by the fans. The nominees in the category are determined by sales, and the winner is chosen from among these nominees by an online vote open to the general public. From 2003 to 2011, the list of nominees was limited to five artists or groups, but it was expanded to ten in 2012.

== Achievements ==
The record for the most wins in this category is held by Justin Bieber, with 5 awards. Avril Lavigne and Shawn Mendes have won 4 awards each, while Michael Bublé has won 3 awards, followed by Nickelback and bbno$ with 2 awards. Justin Bieber has also received the most nominations overall, with 11.

== Recipients ==
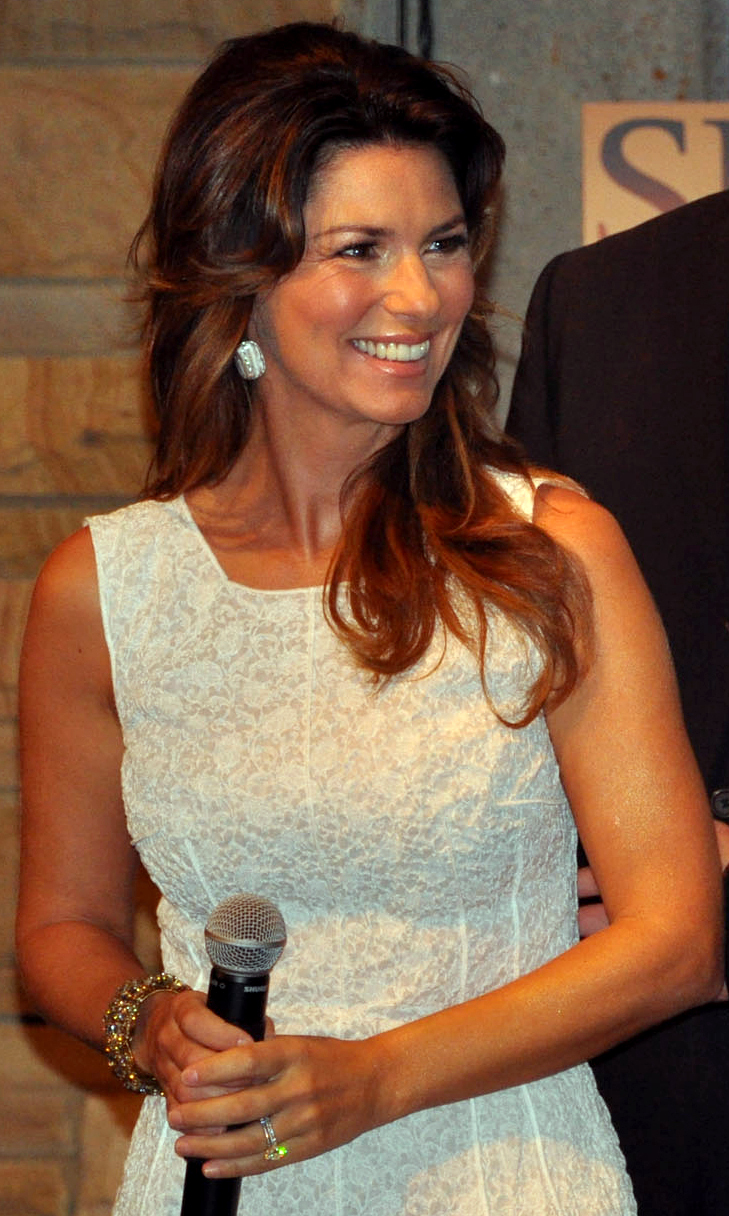
Inaugural winner Shania Twain

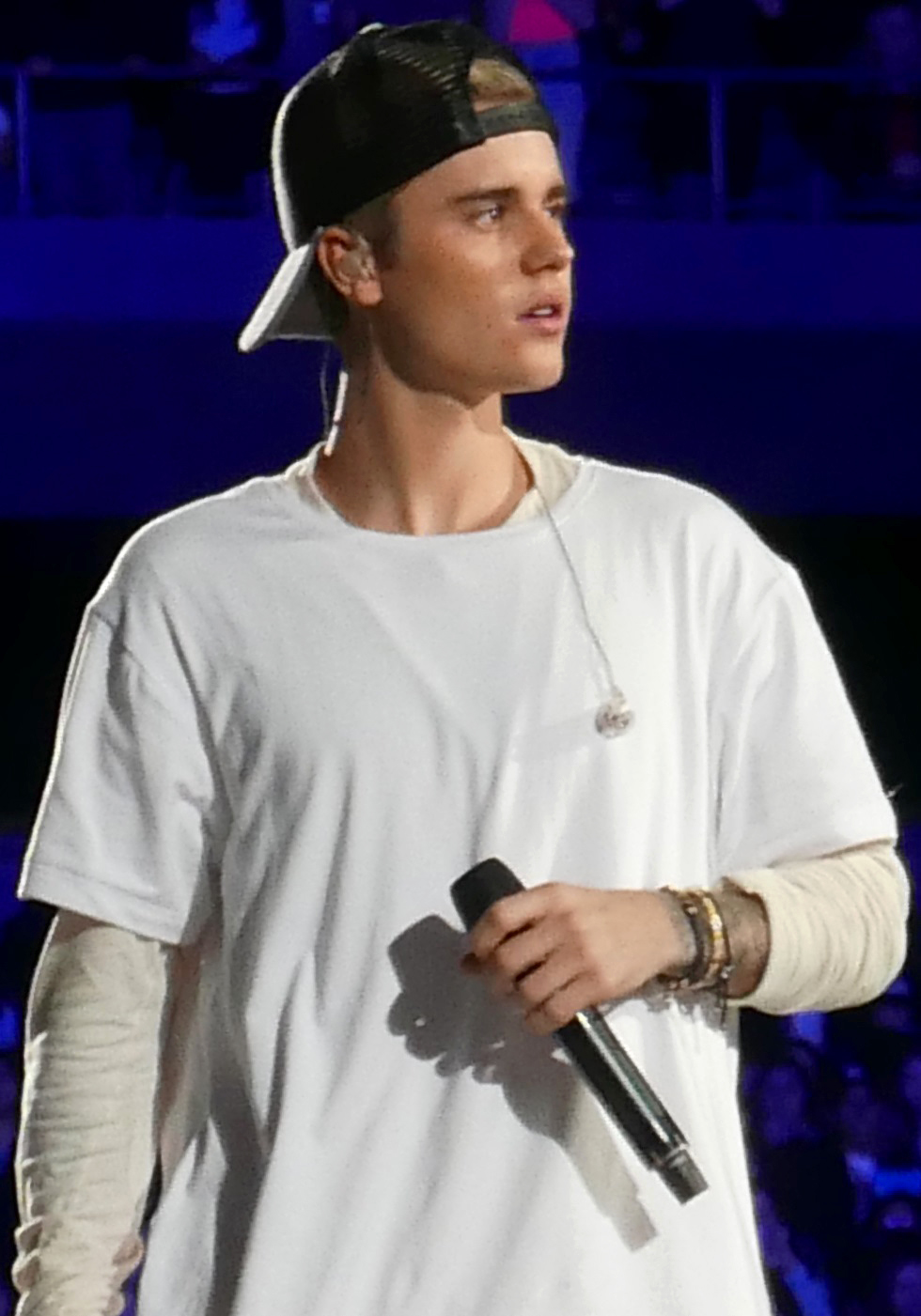
Five-time recipient Justin Bieber has the most wins in this category

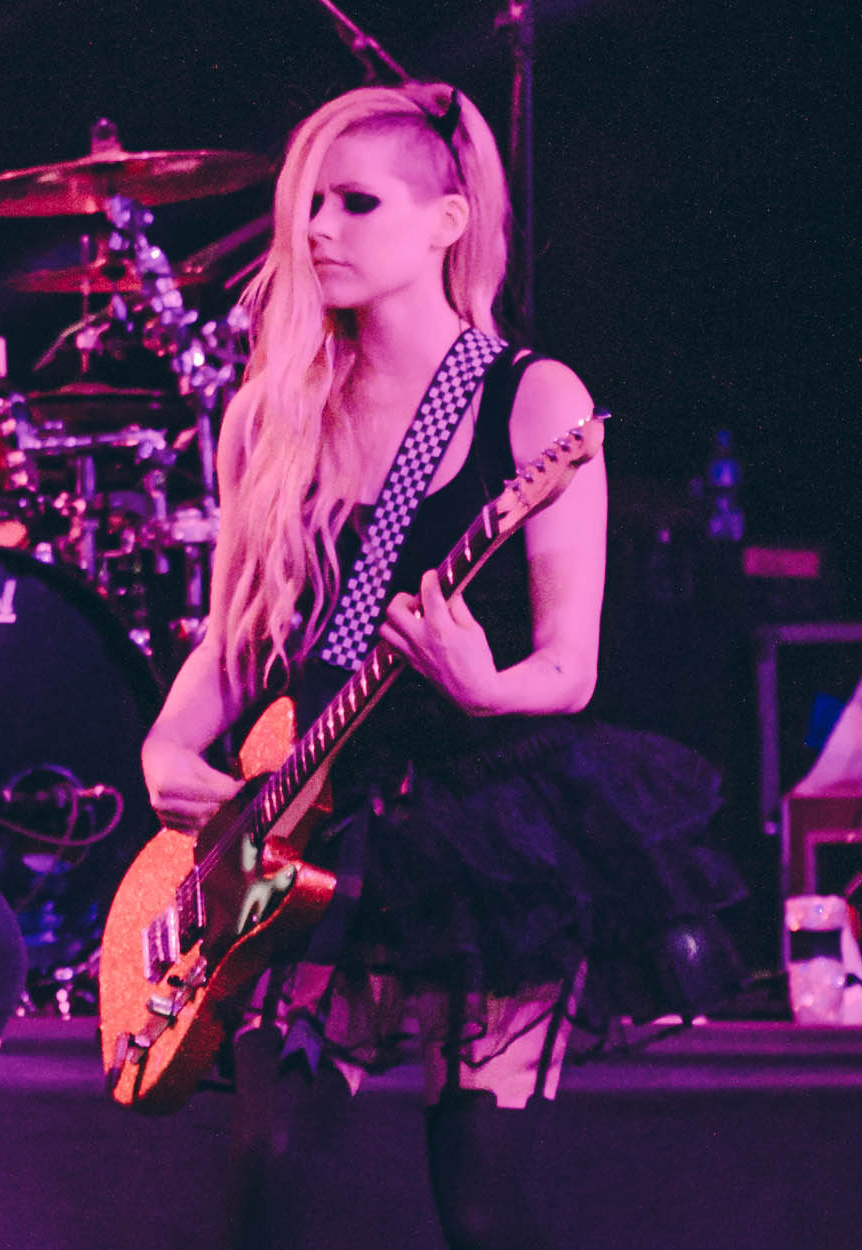
Four-time winner Avril Lavigne

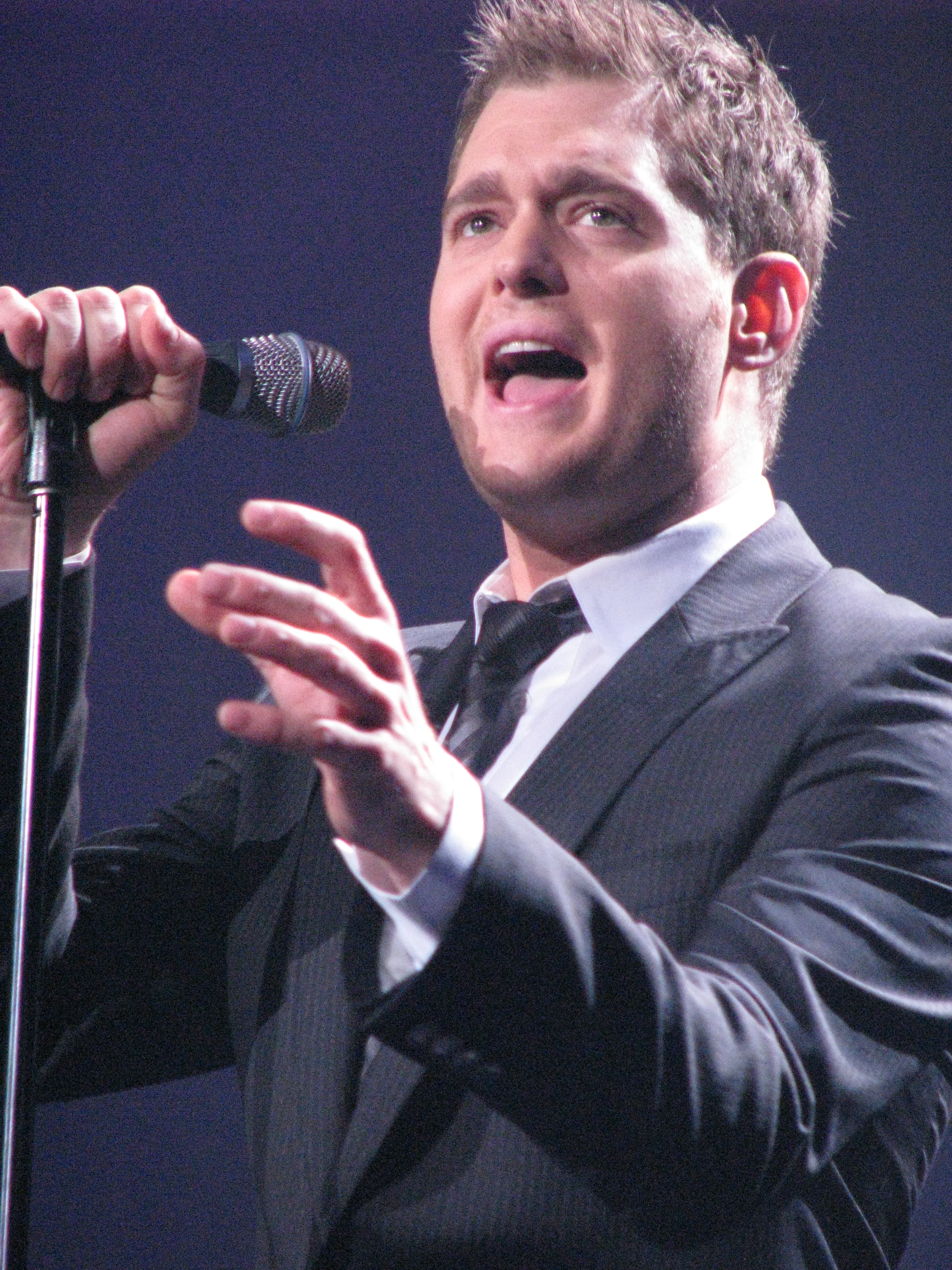
Three-time winner Michael Bublé

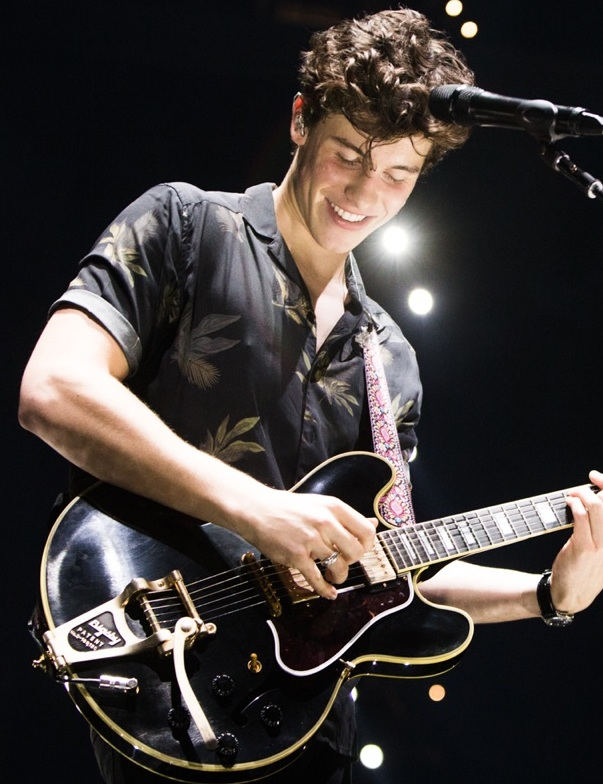
Four-time winner Shawn Mendes

thumb|234x234px|most recent winner bbno$ at Twitchcon 2024]

Year	Winner	Nominees	Refs.
2003	Shania Twain	Celine Dion; Diana Krall; Avril Lavigne; Nickelback	
2004	Nickelback	Celine Dion; Avril Lavigne; Sarah McLachlan; Shania Twain	
2005	Avril Lavigne	Diana Krall; Sarah McLachlan; Marie-Élaine Thibert; Shania Twain	
2006	Simple Plan	Celine Dion; Diana Krall; Michael Bublé; Nickelback	
2007	Nelly Furtado	Gregory Charles; Michael Bublé; Nickelback; Sarah McLachlan	
2008	Michael Bublé	Celine Dion; Claude Dubois; Nelly Furtado; Avril Lavigne	
2009	Nickelback	Celine Dion; Feist; Hedley; The Lost Fingers	
2010	Michael Bublé	Ginette Reno; Johnny Reid; Maxime Landry; Nickelback	
2011	Justin Bieber	Drake; Hedley; Johnny Reid; Michael Bublé	
2012	Justin Bieber	Arcade Fire; Avril Lavigne; City and Colour; deadmau5; Drake; Ginette Reno; Hedley; Michael Bublé; Nickelback	
2013	Justin Bieber	Michael Bublé; Leonard Cohen; Céline Dion; Drake; Hedley; Carly Rae Jepsen; Marianas Trench; Metric; Nickelback	
2014	Justin Bieber	Arcade Fire; Michael Bublé; Celine Dion; Drake; Hedley; Avril Lavigne; Serena Ryder; Robin Thicke; Walk Off the Earth	
2015	Michael Bublé	Arcade Fire; Bobby Bazini; Drake; Hedley; Leonard Cohen; Magic!; Nickelback; Serge Fiori; You+Me	
2016	Justin Bieber	Alessia Cara; Carly Rae Jepsen; Cœur de pirate; Dean Brody; Drake; Shawn Hook; Shawn Mendes; The Weeknd; Walk Off the Earth	
2017	Shawn Mendes	Alessia Cara; Belly; Drake; Hedley; Justin Bieber; Ruth B; The Strumbellas; The Weeknd; Tory Lanez	
2018	Shawn Mendes	Alessia Cara; Arkells; Jessie Reyez; Justin Bieber; Shawn Hook; The Weeknd; Theory; Walk Off The Earth	
2019	Avril Lavigne	bülow; Alessia Cara; Elijah Woods x Jamie Fine; Killy; Loud Luxury; Shawn Mendes; NAV; Tory Lanez; The Weeknd	
2020	Avril Lavigne	bbno$; Justin Bieber; Alessia Cara; Ali Gatie; Tory Lanez; Loud Luxury; Shawn Mendes; Nav; The Weeknd	
2021	Shawn Mendes	Justin Bieber; Les Cowboys Fringants; Ali Gatie; Tate McRae; NAV; JP Saxe; Lennon Stella; Curtis Waters; The Weeknd	
2022	Shawn Mendes	347aidan; bbno$; Charlotte Cardin; Forest Blakk; Jessia; Justin Bieber; Loud Luxury; Pressa; The Weeknd	
2023	Avril Lavigne	Tate McRae; Shawn Mendes; Preston Pablo; Mackenzie Porter; The Reklaws; Rêve; Tyler Shaw; Lauren Spencer-Smith; The Weeknd	
2024	Karan Aujla	Charlotte Cardin; Daniel Caesar; DVBBS; Josh Ross; Shubh; Tate McRae; The Weeknd; ThxSoMch; Walk Off the Earth	
2025	bbno$	Karan Aujla; Dean Brody; Les Cowboys Fringants; Jade Eagleson; Josh Ross; Tate McRae; Shawn Mendes; Preston Pablo; The Weeknd	
2026	bbno$	Karan Aujla; Justin Bieber; James Barker Band; Tate McRae; Shawn Mendes; Josh Ross; Shubh; The Weeknd; Cameron Whitcomb	
