= Semwal (musician) =

Indian musician and producer

- Born: Mumbai, India
- Occupations: Singer; Songwriter; Guitarist; Producer

Shubham Semwal, known professionally as Semwal, is an Indian singer-songwriter, guitarist, and music producer based in Chandigarh. He is active in the independent Punjabi pop music scene. He has released over 30 original tracks, blending Punjabi lyrics with R&B and electronic pop production. As a session musician and producer, Semwal has collaborated with artists such as Karan Aujla, Diljit Dosanjh, Arijit Singh, Badshah and Kaka.

== Career ==
=== Independent music and Elephant In The Room (2020-2021) ===
Semwal released his debut extended play (EP), Elephant In The Room, in 2021. The project was financed through a direct-to-consumer crowdfunding campaign that raised over ₹2.4 lakhs.

The EP features acoustic pop and indie-folk tracks in English and Hindi. Notable tracks include "Tishnagi" and "Take Me Home (Pahadon Mein)", a song written while he was stranded in Chandigarh during the COVID-19 lockdowns. The EP included collaborations with independent musicians Sparsh Dangwal and Julie Ngurang.

=== Mainstream Punjabi pop and production (2023-present) ===
In January 2023, Semwal released the Punjabi synth-pop track "Dil Da Pecha", co-produced with Agaazz and featuring lyrics by Hemant Vijh, with an accompanying music video starring travel vlogger Satya Saggar. The song charted at number one on Extragavanza's weekly "Top Indian Songs" chart. He subsequently released the R&B-influenced Punjabi tracks "Desire" and "Nedhe Nedhe".

In 2024 and 2025, Semwal continued to release collaborative and solo singles. His track "Zulfaan" (2024), a collaboration with Geet and 13 Jay, amassed over 1.1 million streams. In 2025, he released "Ni Billo", which featured live saxophone instrumentation by Dima Faust, and a music video starring television actress Sargun Kaur Luthra. He later compiled several singles into the EP Nishaniyan.

== Musical style and themes ==
Semwal's music incorporates elements of 1980s synth-pop, contemporary R&B, and neo-soul into modern Punjabi pop, diverging from traditional folk and trap-heavy beats.

Lyrically, his songs frequently discuss the complexities of modern digital dating culture. According to Rolling Stone India, tracks like "Dil Da Pecha" serve as a critique of online personas and advocate for traditional, organic relationships.

== Discography ==
Year	Song Name	Format
2026	Nakhre	Non-album single
2025	Tu Ni Jandi	Non-album single
2025	Baatein	Non-album single
2025	Nishaniyan	Nishaniyan
2025	Crazy 4 U	Nishaniyan
2025	Ni Billo	Nishaniyan
2025	Zulfaan	Nishaniyan
2025	Far Away	Nishaniyan
2024	Kinne Saal	Non-album single
2024	Offline	Non-album single
2023	Kinni Sohni	Non-album single
2023	Desire	Non-album single
2023	All Eyes On You	Non-album single
2023	Midnight Gedhi	Non-album single
2023	Nedhe Nedhe	Non-album single
2023	Rabb Rakha	Non-album single
2023	Dil Da Pecha	Non-album single
2022	I Need You	Non-album single
2022	Tishnagi	Elephant In The Room (Deluxe Edition)
2022	Pull Me In	Elephant In The Room (Deluxe Edition)
2022	By Your Side	Elephant In The Room (Deluxe Edition)
2022	Take Me Home(Pahadon Mein)	Elephant In The Room (Deluxe Edition)
2022	Whiskey Sour	Elephant In The Room (Deluxe Edition)
2022	Afsana	Elephant In The Room (Deluxe Edition)
2022	Asar Tera	Elephant In The Room (Deluxe Edition)
2022	Through These Years	Elephant In The Room (Deluxe Edition)
2022	Indian Summer	Elephant In The Room (Deluxe Edition)
2022	Tishnagi - Acoustic	Elephant In The Room (Deluxe Edition)
2022	Pull Me In - Orchestral Reimagination	Elephant In The Room (Deluxe Edition)
2022	Through These Years - Stripped	Elephant In The Room (Deluxe Edition)
2021	Deja Vu	Non-album single
