= Making Memories (album) =

Studio album by Karan Aujla and Ikky
- Released: 18 August 2023
- Recorded: 2023
- Genre: Contemporary Punjabi pop
- Length: 25:16
- Labels: Warner Music Canada, Warner Music India
- Producers: Ikky, Euro, Yeah Proof

Karan Aujla and Ikky chronology
Four You (EP) (2023)	Making Memories (2023)	Street Dreams (2024)

Making Memories is the second studio album by Indian singer-songwriter Karan Aujla in collaboration with Canadian producer Ikky. It was released on 18 August 2023 through Warner Music Canada and Warner Music India. The album comprises nine tracks featuring guest appearances from Yarah and Preston Pablo.

== Background and promotion ==
The project follows Aujla and Ikky's collaborative extended play Four You, released on 4 February 2023. Four You featured four tracks and marked the duo's first partnership, setting the stage for their full-length studio effort later that year.

The album was promoted with singles and music videos for tracks like "Admirin’ You" (featuring Preston Pablo) and "Try Me". These releases highlighted Aujla's lyrical themes of confidence and nostalgia, and were accompanied by visuals shot across urban and rural landscapes.

== Music ==
Musically, Making Memories has been described as a collection of contemporary Punjabi-pop tracks featuring summery motifs and a fusion of traditional folk elements with modern synth and guitar arrangements. Critics praised its seamless transitions and melodic consistency across songs such as "Girl, I Love You" and "What…?".

== Release and reception ==
Upon release, Making Memories debuted at number five on the Canadian Albums Chart, number fourteen on the New Zealand Albums Chart, and number eighty on the UK Digital Albums Chart. It debuted at No. 3 on the Spotify Global Top Albums chart and hit No. 1 on the Apple Music charts in India and Canada. Each of the eight songs from the album charted in the Top 200 in both India and Canada. In its first week, Making Memories earned 7.5 million streams in Canada alone, while globally it garnered over 24 million streams.

It received widespread acclaim for its production quality, catchy hooks, and Aujla's songwriting, leading to an acoustic reinterpretation of three songs from the album titled Making Memories (Unplugged), released in January 2024.

== Track listing ==
Making Memories track listing
No.	Title	Length
1.	"Girl, I Love You (Euro's Intro)"	1:03
2.	"What...?"	2:27
3.	"Admirin' You" (featuring Preston Pablo)	3:35
4.	"Jee Ni Lagda"	2:20
5.	"Try Me"	3:16
6.	"Champion's Anthem"	3:25
7.	"Softly"	2:35
8.	"You"	3:11
9.	"Bachke Bachke" (featuring Yarah)	3:31
Total length:		25:23

== Charts ==
Chart performance for Making Memories
Chart (2023)	Peak position
Canadian Albums (Billboard)	5
New Zealand Albums (RMNZ)	14
UK Album Downloads (Official Charts)	80

== Certifications ==
Certifications for Making Memories
Region	Certification	Certified units/sales
Canada (Music Canada)	Platinum	80,000^{‡}
^{‡} Sales+streaming figures based on certification alone.

== See also ==
- Karan Aujla discography
