= Shubh =

Indian singer-rapper (born 1997)

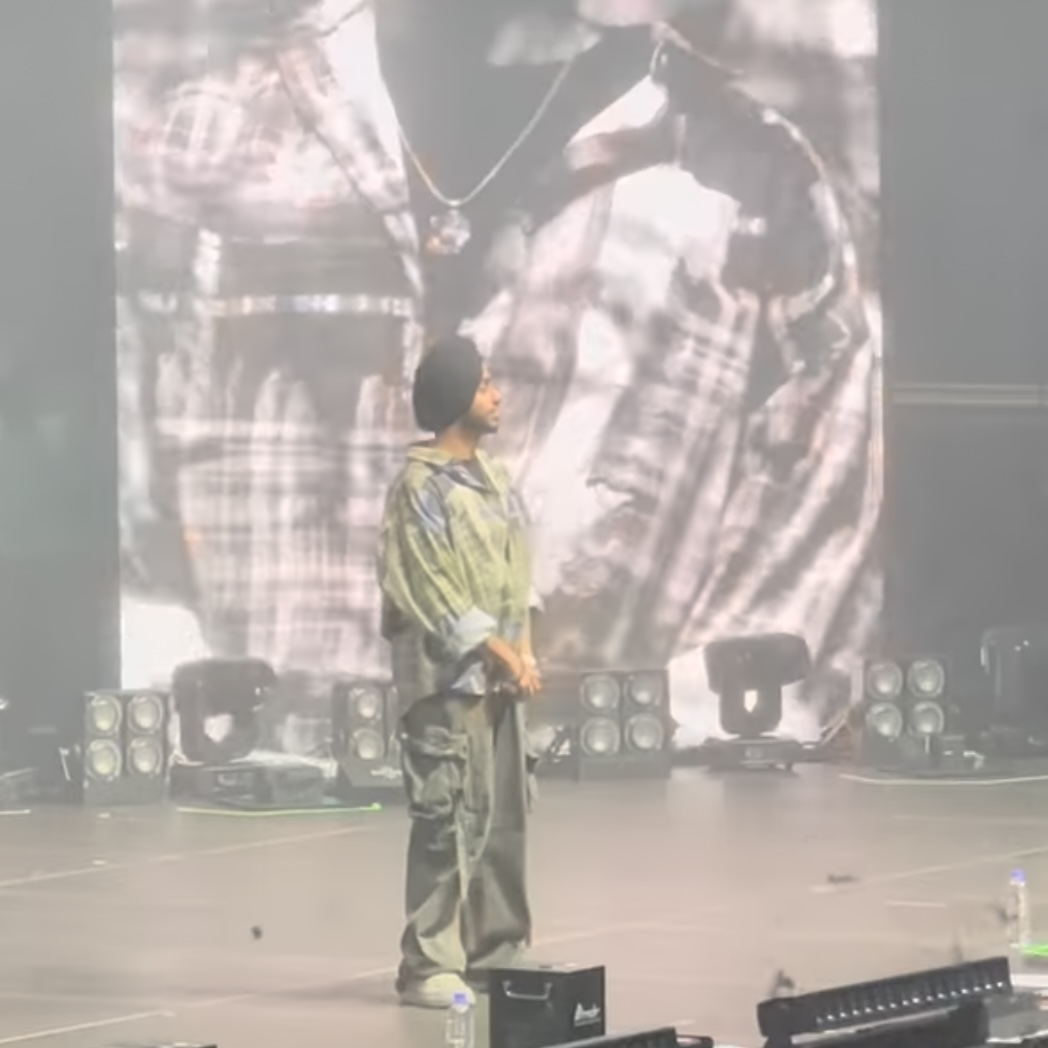
- Shubh, Auckland, 2024

Background information
- Born: Shubhneet Singh; 10 August 1997 (age 29); Nangal, Punjab, India
- Origin: Brampton, Ontario, Canada; Nangal Dam Punjab, India
- Genres: Hip hop; R&B; trap
- Occupations: Rapper; singer; songwriter
- Instrument: Vocals
- Years active: 2021–present

Shubhneet Singh (born 10 August 1997), popularly known as Shubh, is an Indian rapper, singer, and songwriter associated with Punjabi music. Based in Brampton, Ontario, Shubh rose to mainstream in 2021 with his single "We Rollin". He released his debut album Still Rollin in 2023. His numerous singles have charted on the Canadian Hot 100, New Zealand Chart, UK Singles Chart and Billboard India. His single "Baller" charted on the Canadian Hot 100. In 2023, the song "Cheques" from his debut album Still Rollin peaked at number 3 on Billboard India Songs, while album was charted on Canadian Albums Chart and New Zealand Albums Chart. He has officially crossed the 5 billion streams milestone on Spotify, with approximately 5.02 billion streams as of September 2026.

== Early life ==
Shubhneet Singh was born 10 August 1997 in the town of Nangal in Punjab, India, to a Punjabi Sikh family. He has an elder brother Ravneet Singh, who is also an actor, singer, vocalist and host. He moved to Brampton where his musical career started.

== Career ==
=== 2021–2022: musical breakthrough ===
Shubh started in 2021 with single "We Rollin", following which he released songs "Elevated" and "Offshore".

In 2022, Shubh released three singles "No Love", "Baller" and "Her". His song "Baller", with music producer Ikky became his most streamed track of all time. It charted on Canadian Hot 100 at 68.

=== 2023–present: Still Rollin, tour and more ===
In 2023, he released his debut album Still Rollin. The album debuted at number 16 on the Billboard Canadian Albums Chart. He released another single "One Love" in August.

In August 2023, Shubh announced his Still Rolling world tour across 7 countries including India, UK, Australia, New Zealand, UAE, USA and Canada, divided among 7 different phases. The tour came following the release of the album 'Still Rollin'.

Phase 1 is the Still Rolling India Tour, visiting 10 cities in India and including a cruise event. He is scheduled to perform as part of Cruise Control 4.0 event in Mumbai, organised aboard Cordelia Cruise. On 20 September 2023, BookMyShow announced the cancellation of Shubh's Still Rollin tour for India. Prior to this announcement, the electronics brand boAt revealed on X (formerly Twitter) that it had withdrawn its sponsorship of the tour due to the controversy.

The UK phase consisted of concerts in two cities, London and Birmingham.

By just one day prior announcement, Shubh released his first EP Leo on 5 January 2024 under his own label.

On 29 March 2024 Shubh released his another single "Bandana" without prior announcement.

On 10 April Shubh announced his Still Rolling world tour next phase of AUS/NZ in 4 cities in total which includes Melbourne, Brisbane, Auckland and with last concert in Sydney with tickets available on Shubhtour.com with beginning on 3 May 2024. The Brisbane Show held on 4 May was cancelled due to lack of communication between the promoter and venue and as well as due to promoter mismanagement the show permit was revoked. The venue load issues presented by the promoters would result in chaotic and unsafe show.

On Melbourne show 3 May Shubh sang his unreleased song MVP and later released the audio on his YouTube channel on 10 May 2024.

== Controversy ==
In March 2023, when Punjab Police was in search of a pro-khalistan separatist Amritpal Singh, curfew imposed in several districts and mobile internet services were shut down in Punjab, Shubh shared a portrait of an allegedly distorted map of India in his Instagram story titled "Pray for Punjab", created by Amandeep Singh, a graphic artist known by the pseudonym Inkquisitive. The portrait shows a police cop unplugging a light bulb, rendering the states of Punjab, Haryana and Himachal Pradesh dark, while Northeastern states, and the union territories of Jammu and Kashmir and Ladakh were omitted, garnering criticism for a wrong portrayal of the map of India. Notably, actress Kangana Ranaut alleged it was an indirect support of the Khalistan movement. Facing backlash, Shubh removed the story and replaced it with the words "Pray for Punjab" on a black background. Later, Inkquisitive apologised on social media, saying it was "not done intentionally to provoke any sort of separate state agenda" but to show a "blackout in Punjab".

In September 2023, Shubh announced his first Indian tour. The electronics brand boAt withdrew its sponsorship of Shubh's tour following criticism. Subsequently, on 20 September, the ticketing app BookMyShow announced the cancellation of the tour. Indian cricketers like Virat Kohli, KL Rahul, Hardik Pandya and Suresh Raina also unfollowed him on Instagram. On 19 September, Inkquisitive reiterated on social media that Shubh shared his artwork, and apologised saying it was to show a "blackout in Punjab". Showing solidarity to Shubh, Inkquisitive blamed Ranaut for giving it a "pro-khalistan angle". Later on 21 September, Shubh took to his Instagram to provide clarification as a concern for an internet shutdown in Punjab and expressed his disappointment over the cancellation of the tour saying, "India is my country too". Other artists like AP Dhillon, Karan Aujla and Sidhu Moose Wala's team publicly supported Shubh. Several politicians from Punjab, including Harsimrat Kaur Badal, Amrinder Singh Raja Warring, and Bikram Singh Majithia also supported him.

During a concert in London on 29 October 2023, Shubh held up a black hoodie thrown from the audience which allegedly had the date and an image showing assassination of former prime minister Indira Gandhi by her bodyguards Satwant Singh and Beant Singh on a map of Punjab. Later Shubh posted on social media that a lot of clothing, jewellery and phones were thrown at him showing support from the audience and he did not see what was on it along with video.

== Discography ==
=== Studio albums ===
Title	Album details	Peak chart positions	
Title	Album details	CAN	NZ
Still Rollin	Released: 19 May 2023; Label: Self-released; Format: Digital download, streaming	16	40
Sicario	Released: 17 January 2025; Label: Self-released; Format: Digital download, streaming	24	—

=== Extended plays (EPs) ===
Title	Album details	Peak chart positions
Title	Album details	CAN
Leo	Released: 5 January 2024; Label: Self-released; Format: Digital download, streaming	19
Chapter IV	Released: 10 April 2026; Label: Self-released; Format: Digital download, streaming	

=== Singles ===
==== As lead artist ====
List of singles as lead artist, with selected chart positions
Title	Year	Peak chart positions						Music	Certifications	Album
Title	Year	CAN	NZ Hot	IND	UK	UK Asian	UK Punjabi	Music	Certifications	Album
"We Rollin"	2021	—	—	—	—	—	—	Anabolic Beats	MC: Platinum	Non-album singles
"Elevated"	2021	—	—	—	—	—	11	Tatay Produciendo	MC: Platinum	Non-album singles
"Offshore"	2021	—	—	—	—	—	—	Thiarajxtt		Non-album singles
"No Love"	2022	—	—	12	—	—	2	Sosa	MC: Platinum	Non-album singles
"Baller" (with Ikky)	2022	68	10	11	—	2	1	Ikky	MC: Platinum	Non-album singles
"Her"	2022	—	36	—	—	3	2	Lavish Dhiman		Non-album singles
"Still Rollin"	2023	40	14	10	—	2	1	Beast Inside Beats, Lavish Dhiman	MC: Platinum	Still Rollin
"Ice"	2023	—	37	—	—	9	8	Lavish Dhiman		Still Rollin
"Cheques"	2023	77	28	3	—	7	3	Tatay Produciendo	MC: Platinum	Still Rollin
"OG"	2023	—	—	—	—	19	12	Karan Kanchan		Still Rollin
"Ruthless"	2023	—	—	—	—	—	15	Karan Kanchan		Still Rollin
"Dior"	2023	—	—	—	—	20	9	Lavish Dhiman		Still Rollin
"The Flow – Outro"	2023	—	—	—	—	—	20	Tatay Produciendo		Still Rollin
"One Love"	2023	—	—	5	—	17	9	konyalaprod	MC: Gold	Non-album single
"King Shit"	2024	13	3	11	97	2	2	Tatay Produciendo	MC: Gold	Leo
"Safety Off"	2024	—	6	—	—	6	6	Wait a Minute		Leo
"You and Me"	2024	—	7	—	—	3	3	Impala Beats		Leo
"Hood Anthem"	2024	—	9	—	—	—	9	xxDanyRose		Leo
"Bandana"	2024	—	20	—	—	—	—	Sickboi		Non-album singles
"MVP"	2024	—	40	—	—	—	—	Tatay Produciendo		Non-album singles
"Be Mine"	2024	—	26	—	—	—	—	Sickboi		Non-album singles
"Buckle Up"	2025	—	12	—	—	—	—	Sickboi		Sicario
"Carti"	2025	—	25	—	—	—	—	MakDouble		Sicario
"Bars"	2025	—	17	—	—	—	—	Sickboi		Sicario
"Fell for You"	2025	—	21	—	—	—	—	SOE	MC: Gold	Sicario
"Routine"	2025	—	—	—	—	—	—	Tatay Produciendo		Sicario
"Ruger"	2025	—	—	—	—	—	—	JayB, Stimena		Sicario
"In Love"	2025	—	—	—	—	—	—	konyalaprod		Sicario
"Aura"	2025	—	—	—	—	—	—	RSD		Sicario
"Top G"	2025	—	—	—	—	—	—	MakDouble		Sicario
"Reckless"	2025	—	—	—	—	—	—	MakDouble		Sicario
"Supreme"	2025	54	8	—	—	—	—	Kronic, Sickboi		Non-album singles
"Together"	2025	—	—	—	—	—	—	G-Funk, Sfinesse		Non-album singles
"Balenci"	2025	93	—	—	—	—	—	Offsneak, ProdGK		Non-album singles
"Ace"	2026	—	18	—	—	—	—	808K Antares		Chapter IV
"Bounce"	2026	—	36	—	—	—	—	Sickboi		Chapter IV
"Moves"	2026	97	17	—	—	—	—	Greco		Chapter IV
"Broken"	2026	—	—	—	—	—	—	Sickboi		Chapter IV
"Sohniye"	2026	—	22	—	—	—	—	Sickboi, ProdGK, Deetocx		Non-album singles
"Never Left"	2026	—	—	—	—	—	—	Abel Beats, Sickboi		Non-album singles

==== As featured artist ====
List of singles as featured artist
Title	Year	Music	Label
"Don't Look" (Irman Thiara featuring Shubh)	2021	Thiarajxtt	Irman Thiara
