= Forest Blakk =

Canadian singer and songwriter

Forest Blakk is a Canadian pop singer and songwriter.

== Career ==
In 2015 he released "Love Me", his first single. The song reached #34 on the Canadian hot adult contemporary charts in Billboard. His second single, "Where I First Found You", followed in 2017, and the EP Minutes was released in 2018.

His second EP, Sideways, followed in 2020. In 2021, a remix of his single "If You Love Her" as a duet with Meghan Trainor peaked #61 on the Canadian Hot 100, and scored him his first Billboard chart placements in the United States on the Emerging Artists and Adult Top 40 Airplay charts. "If You Love Her" has now been certified double Platinum by the RIAA in the US for sales equivalents over two million copies. Forest's single "Fall Into Me," co-written with Rob Thomas of Matchbox Twenty, has been certified Gold in the US by the RIAA.

He was a nominee for the Juno Fan Choice Award at the Juno Awards of 2022.

== Discography ==
=== Studio albums ===
- Every Little Detail (2022)
- Undone (Love & Loss)[Deluxe] (2024)

=== EP ===
- Minutes (2018)
- Sideways (2020)
- Wake Up! (It's Christmas Time) (2023)
- songs i sped up (2024)
- Oh Joy! (It's Christmas Time) (2024)

=== Singles ===
- "Love Me" (2017)
- "Where I First Found You" (2017)
- "Swipe Right" (2018)
- "Find Me" (2018)
- "Breathe" (2018)
- "Put Your Hands Up" (2019)
- "Wildfire" (2020)
- "Foolish" (2020)
- "Both Sides" (feat. Kamilah Marshall) (2020)
- "If You Love Her" (2020)
- "If You Love Her" (feat. Meghan Trainor) (2021)
- "The Most Beautiful Thought" (2021)
- "Sing Along With Me" (2021)
- "Fall Into Me" (2021)
- "Give You Love" (2022)
- "Another Love Song" (Tep no Remix) (2022)
- "Another Love Song" (Acoustic) (2022)
- "I Choose You" (2023)
- "I Choose You" (Wedding Version) (2023)
- "Love Somebody Again" (2023)
- "Long Story Short" (2024)
- "You Were Mine" (2024)
- "DON’T" (2024)
- "Make It Better" (2024)
