= Preston Pablo =

Canadian singer and songwriter (born 2001)

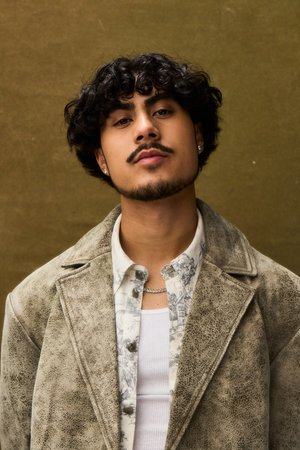
- Preston Pablo 2023
- Born: April 30, 2001 (age 25); Timmins, Ontario, Canada
- Occupations: Singer; songwriter
- Years active: 2020–present
- Musical career
- Labels: Universal Music Canada, Universal Music Group

Preston Pablo (born April 30, 2001) is a Canadian singer-songwriter from Timmins, Ontario. He is most noted as a three-time Juno Award nominee at the Juno Awards of 2023, winning the Breakthrough Artist of the Year award, and receiving nods for Single of the Year for "Flowers Need Rain", and the Fan Choice Award.

== Early life ==
Preston Pablo was born on the 30th of April, 2001 in Timmins, Ontario to parents of Filipino and Ukrainian ancestry. He was introduced to drums at age 13 and learned to play the guitar at home. He wrote songs in his teens and released music in high school. At age 17, he made his solo debut "OMO" on various online platforms.

== Career ==
Montreal-based producers Banx & Ranx discovered Preston through social media and signed him to their label 31 East under Universal Music Canada. In January 2022, he released his first single, "Don't Break (My Soul)" under Universal Music Canada.

In April 2022, he released the single "Flowers Need Rain". The platinum-selling single reached a Top 5 spot at Top 40 radio in Canada and Top 10 at Hot AC and Mainstream AC. He then released "Love You Bad" in October 2022.

In January 2023, he released the single "Ay Ay Ay". He also participated in an all-star recording of Serena Ryder's single "What I Wouldn't Do", which was released as a charity single to benefit Kids Help Phone's Feel Out Loud campaign for youth mental health.

In February 2023, he featured on Lili-Ann De Francesco's song "IDC (Reprise)". In March 2023, he featured on Ikky's song "Ain't No Sunshine" along with Himmat Sandhu.

In April 2023, he opened for SonReal's western Canadian dates.

In May 2023, he released the single "For Keeps".

In August 2023, Pablo featured on Karan Aujla's Punjabi pop song "Admirin' You", produced by Pablo's close friend Ikky. This song is a single from Aujla's studio album, Making Memories.

In September 2023, Pablo released his single "Believe".

In December 2023, he released his latest single, "Dance Alone". In April 2024, he released a remixed afrobeats version of his single "Dance Alone" featuring Qing Madi and Nonso Amadi.

In March 2024, Pablo supported Jon Vinyl on The Heartbreak Hill Tour.

In May 2024, Pablo released another remix of "Dance Alone" featuring Juliana.

In February 2026, Pablo released his latest single, "Cause I Do".

== Discography ==
=== Extended plays ===
List of extended plays, with selected details
Title	Details
She Tried It (with Pablø)	Released: October 23, 2020; Label: SauceOnly; Format: Digital download
Dance Alone	Released: January 31, 2024; Label: Universal Music Group; Format: Digital download
Anywhere but Here	Released: October 25, 2024; Label: 31 East Inc., Universal Music Canada; Format: Digital download
Almost Always	Released: July 3, 2026; Label: 31 East Inc., Universal Music Canada; Format: Digital download

=== Charted singles ===
List of charted singles, with selected chart positions and certifications, showing year released and album name
Title	Year	Peak chart positions			Certifications	Album
Title	Year	CAN	SUR	TUR Int. Air.	Certifications	Album
"Flowers Need Rain" (with Banx & Ranx)	2022	9	—	—	MC: 4× Platinum	Dance Alone
"For Keeps"	2023	59	—	—		Dance Alone
"Admirin' You" (with Karan Aujla and Ikky)	2023	29	—	—	MC: Gold	Making Memories
"Dance Alone"	2023	66	10	4	MC: Gold	Dance Alone and Anywhere but Here
"Cause I Do"	2026	54	—	—		Almost Always
"—" denotes a recording that did not chart or was not released in that territory.

== Awards and nominations ==
List of awards and nominations for Preston Pablo
Year	Award	Category	Work	Result
2023	Juno Awards	Breakthrough Artist	Himself	Won
2023	Juno Awards	Juno Award for Single of the Year	Flowers Need Rain	Nominated
2023	Juno Awards	Juno Fan Choice Award	Himself	Nominated
2023	SOCAN Awards	No. 1 Song Award	Flowers Need Rain	Won
2023	SOCAN Awards	Anglophone Popular Music Award	Flowers Need Rain	Won
2025	Juno Awards	TikTok Juno Fan Choice		Nominated
2025	Juno Awards	Pop Album of the Year	Anywhere But Here	Nominated

=== Listicles ===
Name of publisher, name of listicle, year(s) listed, and placement result
Publisher	Year	Listicle	Placement	Ref.
Forbes	2023	30 Under 30 Local: Toronto	Placed	
