= Sandeep Rehaan =

Indian record producer

- Born: Sandeep Singh Rehaan; Jalandhar, India
- Occupation: Producer
- Years active: 2017–present
- Known for: Rehaan Records
- Notable work: Chitta Kurta, Kya baat Hain & Gangsta by Karan Aujla, YG (rapper)
- Title: Owner of Rehaan Records

Sandeep Rehaan is an Indian producer. He is the owner of Rehaan Records. He is best known for his works in the Punjabi music industry.

== Background ==
Rehaan was born in Lambra, Jalandhar. He moved to Vancouver, Canada in 2000.

== Career ==
Rehaan began producing songs in 2017 with the song Soch by Karan Aujla. He owns Rehaan Records (music company). Singer Karan Aujla is associated with Rehaan and they are working together since 2017. Rehaan is best known for producing many single tracks, 14 of which have been featured in the UK Asian chart by Official Charts Company, while seven have featured in the Global YouTube music chart. He has Produced songs like Don't Worry, Jhanjhar, Kya Baat Aa, Sheikh, Hint, Chitta Kurta, Maxico and It Ain't Legal featured in various music charts.

== Produced songs ==
=== Singles ===
Title	Year	Singer	Lyrics	Music	UK Asian (OCC)	UK Punjabi (OCC)	NZ Hot	YouTube charts					Notes	Ref.
"Don't Worry"(featuring Gurlez Akhtar)	2018	Karan Aujla	Karan Aujla	Deep Jandu	36	—	—	—	—	—	—	—	featuring Gurlez Akhtar	
"No Need"	2019	Karan Aujla	Karan Aujla	Deep Jandu	—	—	—	—	89	60	—	42		
"Don't Look"	2019	Karan Aujla	Karan Aujla	Jay Trak	14	—	—	—	—	—	—	—		
"Hair"	2019	Karan Aujla	Karan Aujla	Deep Jandu	31	—	—	—	—	—	—	—	Video by Sukh Sanghera	
"2 AM	2019	Karan Aujla	Karan Aujla	Roach Killa	20	—	—	—	43	24	45	24		
"Hint"	2019	Karan Aujla	Karan Aujla	Jay Trak	13	5	—	75	14	9	27	5		
"Chitta Kurta"(featuring Gurlez Akhtar)	2019	Karan Aujla	Karan Aujla	Deep Jandu	20	—	—	35	15	13	9	6	featuring Gurlez Akhtar	
"Jhanjar"	2020	Karan Aujla	Karan Aujla	Desi Crew	9	5	—	26	15	6	8	9		
"Sheikh"	2020	Karan Aujla	Karan Aujla	Manna	27	12	—	—	54	33	65	23		
"Let 'em Play"	2020	Karan Aujla	Karan Aujla	Yeah Proof	15	5	—	79	21	10	16	9		
"Haan Haige Aa"(featuring Gurlez Akhtar)	2020	Karan Aujla	Karan Aujla	Avvy Sra	16	9	—	52	25	11	14	13		
"Kya Baat Aa"	2020	Karan Aujla	Karan Aujla	Desi Crew	9	7	—	19	6	6	3	4		
"—" denotes a recording that did not chart or was not released in that territory.
