= We Rollin =

Single by Shubh
- Language: Punjabi
- Released: 17 September 2021
- Genre: Hip hop; pop rap; Indian hip-hop
- Length: 3:19
- Label: Shubh
- Songwriter: Shubh
- Producer: Anabolic Beats

Music video
- "We Rollin" on YouTube

"We Rollin" is a single by Punjabi rapper-singer Shubh. The song was music composed by Anabolic Beatz, and written by Shubh, The song was released on 17 September 2021. The song appeared in the UK Asian Music Chart and UK Punjabi Chart and Apple Music India Daily Chart. We Rollin has Crossed 264 Million views on YouTube May 2025.

== Certifications ==
Certifications for We Rollin
Region	Certification	Certified units/sales
Canada (Music Canada)	Platinum	80,000^{‡}
^{‡} Sales+streaming figures based on certification alone.
