= Bacthafucup =

Studio album by Karan Aujla
- Released: 15 September 2021
- Genre: Punjabi folk; bhangra; hip hop
- Length: 49:15
- Language: Punjabi
- Label: Times Music; Speed Records
- Producer: Tru Skool

Singles from Bacthafucup
- 1. "Chu Gon Do?" Released: 8 July 2021; 2. "Click That B Kickin It" Released: 9 September 2021; 3. "Here and There" Released: 23 September 2021; 4. "Addi Sunni" Released: 30 September 2021; 5. "It Ain't Legal" Released: 7 October 2021; 6. "Ask About Me" Released: 14 October 2021

Bacthafucup (stylized as BacTHAfucUP, BacTHAfu*UP or B.T.F.U) is the first studio album by Indian singer and songwriter Karan Aujla, with music produced by Tru Skool. The album was released on 15 September 2021 by Times Music and Speed Records, with the music video for "Chu Gon Do?" releasing on 8 July 2021. It consists of 13 tracks, and features Harjit Harman, 5 Rivers, Nave Suave, Gurlez Akhtar, and Amaal. The album was streamed more than 95 million times on Spotify.

== Background ==
In November 2020, Karan Aujla announced that he was working on his debut album, and revealed Tru Skool as producer of the album. In May 2021, Aujla titled the album as BacDAfucUP, and in June 2021, the album's intro was released by Speed Records under its final title, BacTHAfucUP. Aujla released the track listing on 2 July 2021. On 8 July 2021, Aujla released "Chu Gon Do"'s music video, directed by Rupan Bal. In an interview Aujla disclosed that each track from the album is of a different kind, and also disclosed that there would be a surprise collaboration on the album. In an interview with Red FM Canada, Karan said that the album would be out on 30 July 2021. However, the album was delayed.

On 2 September, Karan released the second intro for album, "Vibe Check", and stated that the album would be about Punjabi folk music. He also showed some snippets of 3-4 songs from the album. In the intro he announced that the official video of the song "Click that B Kickin It" would be released on 9 September, and the full album will be out on 15 September.

On 9 September 2021, the official video for "Click That B Kickin it" was released, which was directed by Rupan Bal.

The full album was released on all streaming platforms on 15 September 2021.

== Chart performance ==
The track "Chu Gon Do" debuted at number 6 on the UK Asian chart published by the Official Charts Company. The album charted on the Billboard Top Canadian Albums at #19. On 27 September Karan Aujla Became No 1 Digital Artist In India. And 37 In The World.

== Track listing ==
All tracks are written by Karan Aujla.

Bacthafucup track listing
No.	Title	Producer(s)	Length
1.	"Intro"	Tru Skool	1:45
2.	"Here & There"	Tru Skool	4:05
3.	"Addi Sunni"	Tru Skool	4:02
4.	"Boli"	Tru Skool	4:49
5.	"Click That B Kickin It" (featuring Nave Suave)	Tru Skool	4:07
6.	"It Ain't Legal" (featuring Gurlez Akhtar)	Tru Skool	3:34
7.	"Ford"	Tru Skool	3:28
8.	"Chu Gon Do?" (featuring Satnam 5 Rivers & Mad Yardies)	Tru Skool	3:20
9.	"Feel That Flava"	Tru Skool	4:19
10.	"Sharab" (featuring Harjit Harman)	Tru Skool	3:35
11.	"Itz a Hustle"	Tru Skool	3:39
12.	"80 Degrees" (Featuring Amaal)	Tru Skool	4:05
13.	"Ask About Me"	Tru Skool	4:19
Total length:			49:15

== Personnel ==
- Karan Aujla – vocals, writer
- Harjit Harman – featured artist
- Gurlez Akhtar – featured artist
- Amaal Nuux – featured artist
- Satnam Singh 5 Rivers – featured artist
- Mad Yardies – featured artist
- Nave Suave – featured artist
- Ashu Sharma - featured artist
- Kala Cobra - director

=== Technical personnel ===
- Tru Skool – producer
- Teel L – mixing and mastering

=== Video directors ===
- Rupan Bal – for tracks "Chu Gon Do", "Click That B Kickin It", "Here & There", "Addi Sunni", "It Aint Legal" and "Ask About Me"
- Sagar Deol & Janik Rai – for tracks "Intro", "Vibe Check" (second intro)
- B2getherpros – for "Intro"
- Saffron Studios – for "Vibe Check" (second intro)

=== Others ===
- Sandeep Rehaan – presentation
- Deep Rehaan and Mangal Suniel – projection
- Dilpreet VFX – editor, colorist, VFX for videos
- Simar – visuals
- The Atomic Agency – album art
- Chholla – timepasser
- Sunder Bhai - teacher

== Charts ==
Chart performance for Bacthafucup
Chart (2021)	Peak position
Canadian Albums (Billboard)	20
New Zealand Albums (RMNZ)	34
UK Album Downloads (OCC)	24
