= Sheikh (song) =

2020 single by Karan Aujla

Single by Karan Aujla

from the album Sheikh
- Language: Punjabi
- Released: April 19, 2020
- Length: 4:16
- Label: Rehaan Records
- Songwriter: Karan Aujla
- Producers: Manna; Sandeep Rehaan (exec.)

Karan Aujla singles chronology
"Red Eyes" (2020)	"Sheikh" (2020)

Music video
- "Sheikh" on YouTube

Sheikh is a song by Indian singer and lyricist Karan Aujla. The song was written by Aujla and music was composed by Manna. The music video was directed by Rupan Bal, and was shot in Dubai and Punjab, India. The song was released on 19 April 2020, along with its music video by Rehaan Records. The official poster of the song was released by Aujla on 20 March 2020.

== Background ==
"Sheikh"'s audio was leaked in early February 2020. Aujla started filming its music video in March 2020. He released the song's cover on 20 March 2020 on his Instagram handle. On 17 March 2020, the song's music video was leaked on YouTube. Following the leak, Aujla announced the release of the original song and its music video. Some of the regional Punjabi channels accused Karan Aujla's co-artist Deep Jandu of leaking the song. However, Aujla and Jandu both rubbished the news, and stated it was false. Jandu is also credited as a co-composer on Gaana.

== Music video ==
The music video was directed by Rupan Bal, and was shot in Dubai and Punjab, India. Aujla himself starred in it, and a 18K hand crafted GTR and a Bugatti were used in the music video. The song's audio and video were leaked before its original release. One of the leaked version audios on YouTube was viewed over eight million times. Following the leak, additional visual effects were added to the music video, which includes large whales floating in the sky. A chained tiger and a monkey also appeared in the music video. Its official music video was released on 19 April 2020 on YouTube, by Rehaan Records. It topped the trending list in India; and was viewed over three million times within twenty-four hours of its release.

== Reception ==
The older version of the song debuted at number 99 on Apple Music daily charts in India, upon release of the music video. And, it jumped to number 43 on the next day. In United Kingdom, the song debuted at number 32 on Asian music chart, and entered top 30 in next week. On The Official Punjabi chart by Official Charts Company and BritAsia TV, the song debuted at number 12.
