= G.O.A.T. (Diljit Dosanjh album) =

Studio album by Diljit Dosanjh
- Released: July 30, 2020
- Genres: Bhangra; pop; hip-hop
- Length: 66:50
- Language: Punjabi
- Label: Diljit Dosanjh
- Producers: Urban King; G-Funk; The Kidd; Desi Crew; Gupz Sehra; Intense; Young Starr Pop Boy; Ikky; Mr Rubal; Black Virus; Deep Jandu

Diljit Dosanjh chronology
Roar (2018)	G.O.A.T. (2020)	Moonchild Era (2021)

Singles from G.O.A.T.
- 1. "G.O.A.T." Released: July 29, 2020; 2. "Clash" Released: August 11, 2020; 3. "Peed" Released: August 21, 2020; 4. "Born To Shine" Released: September 5, 2020

G.O.A.T. is the eleventh studio album by Indian-American Punjabi vocalist Diljit Dosanjh, released on July 30, 2020, by Famous Studios. The title track of the album and its music video was released a day prior to the album's release. The songs were written by Karan Aujla, Raj Ranjodh, Amrit Maan, among various other artists. The album was produced by various artists including Desi Crew and The Kidd.

The album cover draws inspiration from Roxette's 1988 album Look Sharp!.

== Background ==
The album was announced by Dosanjh in 2018.

== Track listing ==
Track listing and credits as per Diljit Dosanjh's Instagram:

No.	Title	Lyrics	Music	Length
1.	"Intro"	G. Sidhu	Urban King	1:58
2.	"G.O.A.T."	Karan Aujla	G-Funk	3:43
3.	"Clash"	Raj Ranjodh	The Kidd	2:56
4.	"Navi Navi Yaari"	Rony Ajnali, Gill Michhrai	Desi Crew	3:35
5.	"Peed"	Raj Ranjodh	Gupz Sehra	3:37
6.	"Taare"	Happy Raikoti	Intense	3:23
7.	"Track Suit" (featuring Nimrat Khaira)	Laadi Chahal	Desi Crew	3:18
8.	"Faraar"	Ranbir Singh	YoungStarr Pop Boy	3:13
9.	"Jatti"	Shree Brar	Desi Crew	2:59
10.	"Akh Laal Jatt Di"	Amrit Maan	Ikky	4:00
11.	"Pyaar"	D Harp	Mr. Rubal	3:56
12.	"Habit"	Manjinder Brar	The Kidd	3:03
13.	"Range"	Shree Brar	Black Virus	2:52
14.	"Patola" (featuring Kaur B)	Shree Brar	Deep Jandu	3:34
15.	"Whiskey"	Laadi Chahal	Desi Crew	3:25
16.	"Born to Shine"	Amrit Maan	Desi Crew	3:33
Total length:				54:08

== Personnel ==
- Diljit Dosanjh – vocals, executive producer
- Nimrat Khaira – featured artist (track 7)
- Kaur B – featured artist (track 14)
- J Roe & I Am Fame – additional vocals (track 2.1)
- Adonis – additional vocals (track 2.2)

=== Technical personnel ===
- Dense – engineer (track 3, 16)
- Q Made the Beat – engineer (1,4,6,7,8,9,10,11,12,13,14,15)
- Desi Crew – producer (tracks 4, 7, 15, 16)
- G-Funk – producer (track 2)
- Sumit Grover – engineer (track 5)
- Intense – producer (track 6)
- Deep Jandu – producer (track 14)
- Urban King – producer (track 1)
- The Kidd – producer (tracks 3, 12)
- Tom Lowry – engineer (track 2)
- YoungStarr Pop Boy – producer (track 8)
- Mr. Rubal – producer (track 11)
- Gupz Sehra – producer (track 5)
- Ikwinder Singh – producer (track 10)
- Black Virus – producer (track 13)

== Charts ==
=== Album ===
Chart (2020)	Peak position
Canadian Albums (Billboard)	16
UK Album Downloads (Official Charts)	47

=== Singles ===
Title	Chart (2020)	Peak position
"G.O.A.T."	New Zealand Hot Singles(RMNZ)	13
"G.O.A.T."	Top Triller Global (Billboard)	1
"G.O.A.T."	Top Triller U.S. (Billboard)	7
"G.O.A.T."	UK Asian (OCC)	1
"G.O.A.T."	UK Punjabi (OCC)	1
"Clash"	UK Asian (OCC)	3
"Clash"	UK Punjabi (OCC)	4
"Peed"	UK Asian (OCC)	2
"Peed"	UK Punjabi (OCC)	2
"Navi Navi Yaari"	UK Punjabi (OCC)	7
"Track Suit"	UK Punjabi (OCC)	8
"Patola"	UK Punjabi (OCC)	17

== Reception ==
The title track "G.O.A.T." was trending in various countries on YouTube. The song debuted at number 1 on Apple Music chart in India. Also, "Clash" and "Navi Navi Yaari" from the album debuted in top 5. The album topped most of the platform charts in India. The song "G.O.A.T." debuted at number 2 on UK Asian chart by Official Charts Company and number 13 on New Zealand Hot Singles by Recorded Music NZ. Also, Dosanjh entered Social 50 chart by Billboard, following the release of the album. Also, the album entered top 20 on Canadian Albums Chart.
