= Jhanjar =

2020 single by Karan Aujla

Single by Karan Aujla
- Released: January 18, 2020
- Length: 3:22
- Label: Rehaan Records
- Composer: Desi Crew
- Lyricist: Karan Aujla
- Producer: Sandeep Rehaan

Karan Aujla singles chronology
"Chitta Kurta" (2019)	"Jhanjar" (2020)	"Red Eyes" (2020)

Music video
- "Jhanjar" on YouTube

"Jhanjar" is a song by Indian singer and lyricist Karan Aujla. The song was written by Aujla and music was composed by Desi Crew. The music video was directed by Tru Makers. Produced by Sandeep Rehaan under Rehaan Records, the song was released on 18 January 2020, on occasion of Aujla's birthday.

The song hit various YouTube music charts upon its release. It was ranked No. 26 on Global and No. 8 on India YouTube weekly music charts.

== Music video ==
The music video of the song was shot in January 2020 in India by Tru Makers(Dilsher Singh and Khushpal Singh). It starred Aveera Singh Masson in female lead. The music video was released on 18 January 2020 on YouTube by Rehaan Records. It was viewed over five million times within twenty-four hours of its release. Also, it topped the trending lists in Australia, Canada, and India. As of January 2025, it has been viewed over 200 million times on YouTube.
