= Chitta Kurta =

2019 single by Karan Aujla ft. Gurlez Akhtar

Single by Karan Aujla

from the album Chitta Kurta
- Released: December 3, 2019
- Recorded: November 2019
- Genre: Punjabi
- Length: 3:37
- Label: Rehaan
- Composer: Deep Jandu
- Lyricist: Karan Aujla
- Producer: Sandeep Rehaan

Karan Aujla singles chronology
| "Hint" (2019) | "Chitta Kurta" (2019) | "Jhanjar" (2020) |

Music video
- "Chitta Kurta" on YouTube

"Chitta Kurta" (transl. "White Kurta") is a song by Indian singer and lyricist Karan Aujla featuring Gurlez Akhtar. The song was written by Aujla and music was composed by Deep Jandu . The music video was directed by Sukh Sanghera and starred Tanu Grewal as the female lead in it. The song was released on 3 December 2019 by Rehaan Records. The lyrics and Video describe how Aujla's new white clothes got dirty while dealing with his enemies.

The song hit various charts upon its release. It appeared on Global, Australia, Canada, India, and New Zealand YouTube weekly charts. Also, the song appeared in the UK Asian music chart (BBC) and Apple Music India daily chart. In December 2019, the song and Aujla were the most-listened song and artist respectively on YouTube in Punjab, India and Chandigarh. However, the song was criticized for promoting violence. It was also said that he replied to his rival Sidhu Moose Wala's song 'Dhakka' which was released on the same day.

== Music video ==
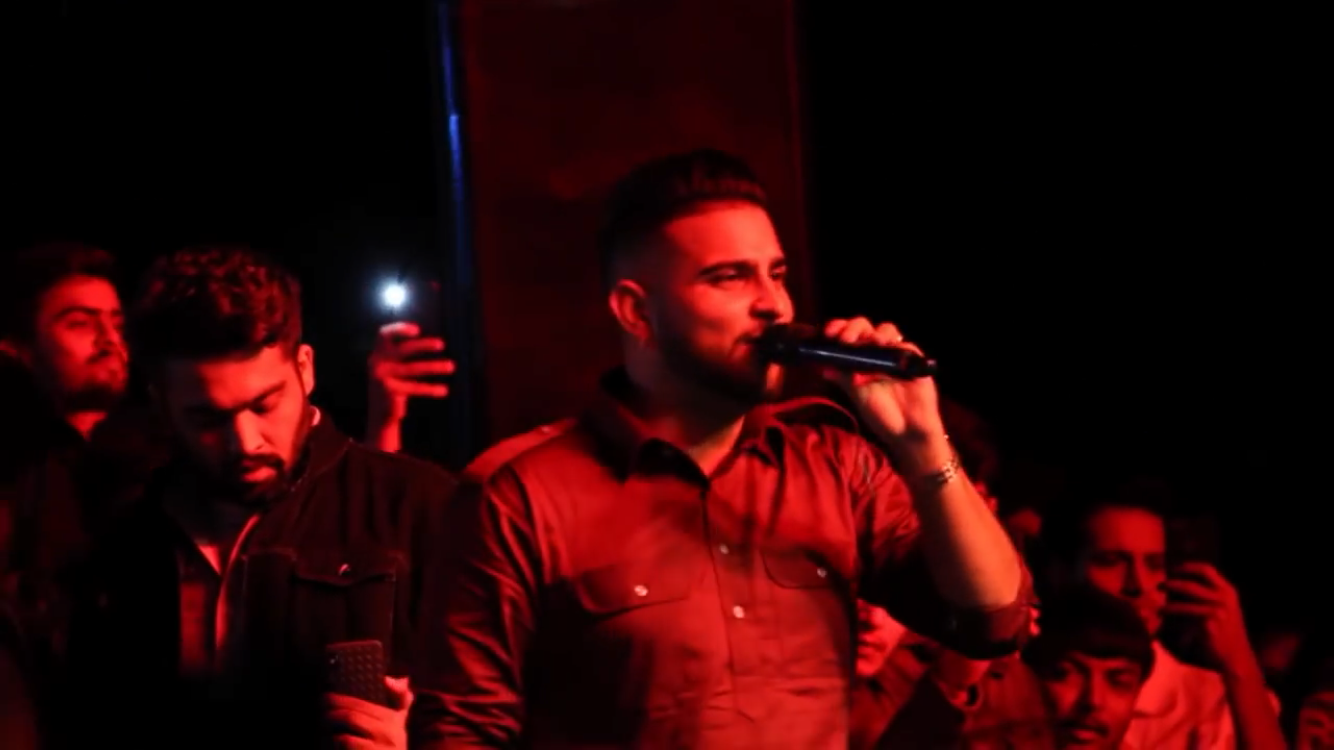
Aujla performed "Chitta Kurta" in his live performance at Chandigarh on 29 November 2019

The music video of the song was directed by Sukh Sanghera, who also served as cinematographer. The filming of the video lasted for two days in November 2019 in Canada. Sanghera in his vlog disclosed Gurlez Akhtar was selected as a female singer after the filming of music video. Karan Aujla and Tanu Grewal acted as lead artists in the music video. The music video was released on YouTube on 3 December 2019 by Rehaan Records and it trended for over nine days in Punjab, India. As of January 2025, it has been viewed over 300 million times.

== Accolades ==
Karan Aujla and Gurlez Akhtar were nominated for Best Duet Vocalists at PTC Punjabi Music Awards.
