= Red Eyes (song) =

2020 single by Karan Aujla ft. Gurlez Akhtar

Single by Karan Aujla

from the album Red Eyes
- Released: February 25, 2020
- Recorded: February 2020
- Length: 2:43
- Label: Rehaan
- Composer: Proof
- Lyricist: Karan Aujla
- Producer: Proof

Karan Aujla singles chronology
"Jhanjar" (2019)	"Red Eyes" (2020)	"Sheikh" (2020)

Music video
- "Red Eyes" on YouTube

"Red Eyes" is a song by Indian singer and lyricist Karan Aujla with Gurlez Akhtar. The song was written by Aujla and music was composed by Proof. The music video was directed by Jeona & Jogi. The song was released on 25 February 2020 by released by Speed Records, Times Music, and Rehaan Records. The song hit various charts upon its release. It appeared on Global, Australia, Canada, India, and New Zealand YouTube weekly charts. Also, the song appeared in the UK Asian music chart (BBC) and Apple Music India daily chart. On 20 March 2020, Speed Records released a remix version of the song.

== Music video ==
The music video of the song was directed by Jeona & Jogi, whereas Sukh Kamboj served as cinematographer. The filming of the video began in early February 2020. Karan Aujla and Ginni Kapoor acted as lead artists in the music video. The music video was released on YouTube on 25 February 2020 by Rehaan Records. As of April 2025, it has been viewed over 100 million times on YouTube.

== Chart performance ==
The song debuted at number eight on the UK Asian music chart by Official Charts Company, becoming Aujla's second top 10 in the chart after "Jhanjar".
