= Pandit Rao Dharennavar =

Indian professor

- Born: Shirashyad Salotagi, Bijapur, India
- Education: Jawahar Lal Nehru University, Delhi
- Occupations: Professor, Writer
- Writing career
- Genre: Translating Sikh religious texts to Kannada

Prof. Pandit Rao Dharennavar is an Indian lecturer, known for his translation of social and religious literature between Kannada and Punjabi languages. He is serving as an assistant professor at Government College, Chandigarh.

== Birth ==
He was born at Shirashyad Salotagi of Indi taluk in Bijapur district in 1975. He completed his M. Phil in Sociology from Jawaharlal Nehru University, New Delhi. He joined Government College, Sector 26, Chandigadh in 2003. He is working on translation of Guru Granth Sahib to Kannada for which he received 1 Lakh funds from UT administrator Shivraj Patil.

== Works ==
Translation of following works from Kannada to Punjabi:

- Vachana sahitya
- Dasa sahitya and Tatva-vada by Allama Prabhu
- Basava
- Akka Mahadevi
- Sarvajna
- Kanaka Dasa
- Purandara Dasa,
- Shishunala Sharif
- Bhimashankar Maharaj.

Translation of following Punjabi works to Kannada:

- Japji Sahib
- Sukhmani Sahib
- Zafarnama (letter)
