= Warner Music India =

Indian record label

- Founded: 2020; 6 years ago
- Founder: Warner Music Group
- Distributor: Warner Music Group
- Genre: Pop, Hip-hop, Rock, Bollywood, and Folk music
- Country of origin: India
- Official website: www.warnermusicindia.co

Warner Music India (WMI) is a branch of the global music company Warner Music Group (WMG) focused on the Indian music market. It was officially launched in March 2020, by Jay Mehta.

== About ==
In the Indian music scene, Warner Music India is a part of the larger Warner Music Group. Their vision is to take the Indian sound global. Warner Music India is home to a curated catalogue of diverse artists across genres, categories and voices. The music promoted is intended to drive an entertainment culture, holding authenticity, originality and creativity at its core, speaking to a multitude of audiences that spans across all generations of listeners. WMI is also home to the label MAATI that is producing folk recordings.

== Artists ==
- Darshan Raval
- Diljit Dosanjh
- Armaan Malik
- Guru Randhawa
- King
- Reet Talwar
- Munawar Faruqui
- Sid Sriram
- Ravi Singhal
- Aditya Bhardwaj
- Srushti Tawade
- Himonshu Parikh
