= Karan Aujla =

Indian singer and rapper (born 1997)

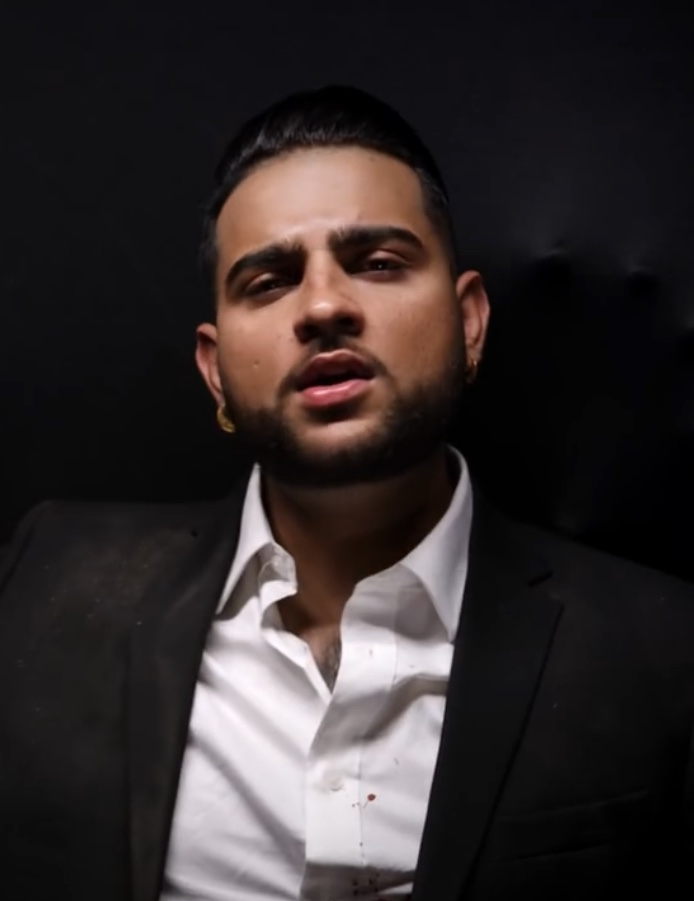
- Aujla in 2020

Background information
- Also known as: Geeta Di Machine
- Born: Jaskaran Singh Aujla; 18 January 1997 (age 29); Ludhiana district, Punjab, India
- Genres: Pop rap; hip-hop; pop; R&B
- Occupations: Rapper; singer; songwriter
- Years active: 2014–present
- Labels: Rehaan Records; Warner Music; Geet MP3; Speed Records (Times Music)
- Spouse: Palak Aujla (m. 2023)
- Website: www.karanaujlamusic.com

Jaskaran Singh Aujla (born 18 January 1997) is an Indian rapper, singer and songwriter who is primarily associated with Punjabi music. He is known for his numerous tracks which have charted on the UK Asian chart published by the Official Charts Company, while seven have charted on the Global YouTube music chart. His debut album Bacthafucup peaked at number 20 on Billboard Canadian Albums chart and 34th on the New Zealand albums chart, earning him the title of the Largest Digital Artist 2021 on Spotify and had been listed in their Most Popular Artists in Punjabi Music Industry.

Aujla started as a songwriter for Jassi Gill's "Range", from his album Replay. He worked as a songwriter for various other artists including Deep Jandu and Elly Mangat. In 2016, he released his debut song "Property of Punjab" as a lead artist, and started featuring as guest artist in songs. He came into limelight with his tracks like "Yaarian Ch Fikk", "Unity", "Alcohol 2", and "Lafaafe"; subsequently he achieved mainstream popularity in 2018 with "Don't Worry", his first song to enter UK Asian chart. In 2020, his singles "Jhanjar", "Red Eyes" and "Kya Baat Aa" entered top 10 in the chart, while "So Far" entered top 5.

== Early life ==
Jaskaran Singh Aujla was born on 18 January 1997 in the Ghurala village of Ludhiana district in Punjab, India, to Balwinder Singh Aujla and Rajinder Kaur. Aujla lost both of his parents at a young age; his father died in a bike accident when Aujla was 9, with his mother subsequently dying of cancer when he was 14. Aujla was raised by his sisters and uncle.

While studying in 9th grade, Aujla met Jassi Gill in a wedding ceremony and offered him the lyrics of the song Range, which Gill sang and became popular locally. In 2014, Aujla moved to Canada, where he lived with his sister in Vancouver, British Columbia, and attended Burnaby South Secondary School in Burnaby. Aujla worked part-time as a longshoreman in Surrey.

== Career ==
=== 2014–2017: Early career ===
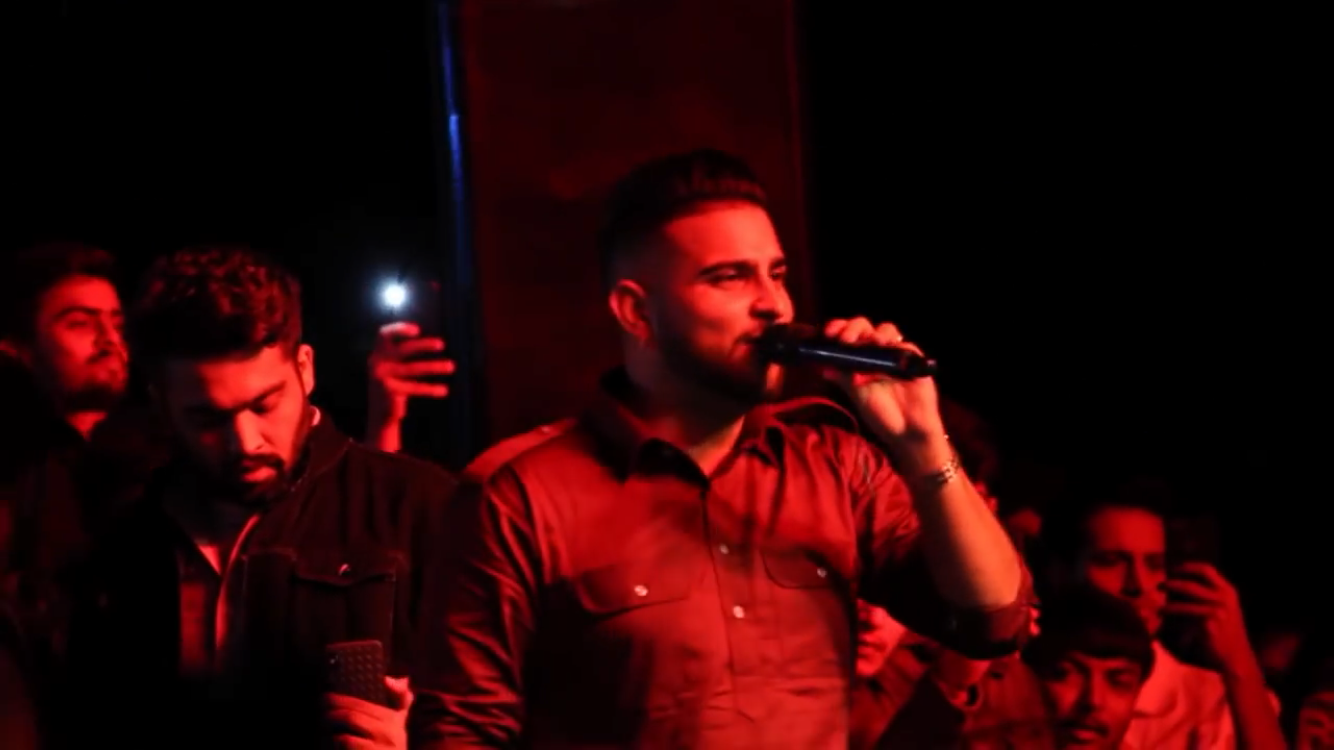
Aujla performing live at Chandigarh in 2019

His debut song "Cell Phone" with Mac Benipal was released in 2014, it was a commercial failure, and had just a few thousand views, Aujla started to attended studio sessions with Deep Jandu and Elly Mangat in Toronto, Ontario. He started to work as a songwriter for artists including Gill, Mangat, Gagan Kokri, Jazzy B, Bohemia and Sukh-E. One of his songs "Blessings of Bapu", sung by Kokri was well received by audience. Later in 2016, he released his debut song "Property of Punjab" as a lead artist; (Note: Although his debut song as a lead artist was "Cell Phone" released in 2014, but the song wasn't released by himself or any major record label.) started featuring and performing raps in the songs. Soon after, he released tracks as a lead artist. His recordings include "Alcohol 2", "Yaarian Ch Fikk", "Shit Talk", "Up & Down", and "Lafaafe".

=== 2018–2019: Rise to fame ===
Aujla got his breakthrough with the song "Don't Worry", featuring Gurlez Akhtar. The song's music video has been viewed over hundred million times on YouTube, and became Aujla's first song to enter UK Asian music chart.

The song was followed by other successes "Rim vs Jhanjhar", "Na Na Na", and "No Need". "Rim vs Jhanjhar" was included in Apple Music 2010s Punjabi essentials playlist. His song "Don't Look" remained in Asian Music Chart for more than twenty-four weeks. The song also appeared in 2019 Apple Music India charts. Also, his songs "Don't Worry", "Hair", "2AM", and "Hint" have been ranked on the chart. In July 2019, Aujla released a title track for the film Sikander 2. His song "Hint" trended for over five days on YouTube in India. Also the song was ranked various charts. The song was debuted at No. 13 on Asian music chart while at number 75 on Global, 27 in India, 9 in Canada, 14 in Australia, and 5 in New Zealand on YouTube charts respectively. Aujla also become the most-listened artist in Punjab, India in December 2019 on YouTube. His next "Chitta Kurta" was also peaked at number 35 and 9 on Global and Indian YouTube charts respectively. In 2019, Spotify included Aujla in the list of the most popular artists in Punjab. Also, he was nominated for Best Singer - Punjabi category at Gaana User's Choice Icons award.

=== 2020–present: Established artist ===
In January 2020, the music video for his song "Jhanjar" was viewed over five million times within 24 hours on YouTube, and topped the trending lists in Australia, Canada, and India. The song debuted at number 26 on Global and number 8 on India YouTube Music charts. Also, it entered top 10 on UK Asian music chart. His next "Red Eyes" peaked at number 8 on UK Asian and also appeared on other YouTube charts. In March 2020, his mixtape titled Geetan Di Machine was released unofficially on various music platforms, which consists of his unreleased and leaked songs, and the album was later removed. In April 2020, his song "Sheikh" along with an accompanying music video was leaked. Within the few hours of leak, Aujla announced the official release of the original audio and music video. In May 2020, his four singles "Red Eyes", "Sheikh", "Chitta Kurta", and "Jhanjar" appeared simultaneously on UK Asian chart. In the same month, Aujla on his Instagram live stated that he is working on his debut album. In June 2020, his "Let 'em Play" peaked at number 14 on Apple Music chart, and debuted at number 15 on UK Asian chart. In July 2020, "So Far" became his first track to enter top 5 on UK Asian chart.

His "Haan Haige Aa" was viewed around eleven million times in twenty-four hours. In the same month, his written "G.O.A.T." from Diljit Dosanjh's album of the same name was released, it became a major commercial success. Also, the song debuted at number 13 on New Zealand Hot Singles by Recorded Music NZ, and topped UK Asian, UK Punjabi, and Top Triller Global chart by Billboard, and became his first song to appear on any New Zealand and Billboard official chart. It debuted at number one on Apple Music chart in India. In August 2020, "Kya Baat Aa" starring Tania in its music video, was released with no prior announcement. The song peaked at number one on Spotify chart in India. His next song "Adhiya" released on YouTube in October 2020. His song "Chithiyan", launched 10 November 2020 by Speed Records, gathered 32 million views within a fortnight of being released. In December, he collaborated with Bohemia, The Game and J. Hind, for a single "Ek Din". He released his single, "Hukam", on 4 February 2021 on YouTube through Rehaan Records. He went on to collaborate with Dilpreet Dhillon for the fifth time for the latter's song "Jatt Te Jawani" released on 23 April 2021.

Later in 2021, he announced his debut album named Bacthafucup (B.T.F.U.) produced by Tru Skool. In June he released "Intro", which was followed by the release of "Chu Gon Do", the album's first single, in the following month. He released the full album on 15 September 2021. The album reached the Trending chart and peaked on many mainstream charts on Apple Music, iTunes and Spotify.

On 16 September 2021, Karan Aujla became India's Biggest Digital Artist with a world ranking of 38. His debut album charted at No. 6 on Spotify Global Debut Album chart and on No. 19 on Billboard Canadian Album charts.

In January 2022, he released his collaboration "YKWIM" with rapper KR$NA and announced his debut EP Way Ahead at the end of song, which released in May. This EP was followed by his EPs Four You, which released in the following year and Four Me, which released in 2024.

In 2023, he released his sophomore studio album Making Memories, which debuted on No. 5 on the Billboard Canadian Album charts. The album featured a collection of contemporary Punjabi-pop tracks featuring summery motifs and a fusion of traditional folk elements with modern synth and guitar arrangements. It received widespread acclaim for its production quality, catchy hooks, and Aujla’s songwriting, leading to an acoustic reinterpretation of three songs from the album titled Making Memories (Unplugged), which released in January 2024.

In February 2024, he collaborated with Mumbai rapper Divine on the album Street Dreams, which fused harder hip-hop and smooth R&B pop and debuted on No. 22 on Billboard Canadian Album charts.

In 2025, Aujla announced his third studio album, P-Pop Culture, during his concert in Montreal, Canada on 26 July, which was followed by a teaser release on YouTube, ahead of the release of the album's lead single, "MF Gabhru", on 1 August. The double album released on 22 August 2025, comprising five tracks on the first disc and six tracks on the second.

In October 2025, he featured on singer-songwriter Ed Sheeran's EP, Play (The Remixes). In August 2026, he appeared as a guest judge on the second season of the show, India's Got Latent. He is now set to headline the hip-hop festival, Rolling Loud India, for the second time.

== Personal life ==
In 2019, Aujla got a tattoo of his mother's face on his right arm. He also has a tattoo of his father on the same arm. In March 2020, he got tattoos of Indian freedom fighters Bhagat Singh and Udham Singh on his left arm. Aujla has expressed his willingness to collaborate with rappers 50 Cent and Drake.

Aujla married his long-term girlfriend, Palak, in 2023.

=== Relocation to Dubai ===
In June 2019, reports speculated that Aujla was attacked in Surrey, British Columbia on 8 June 2019. A Punjab-based gang took responsibility of the attack, but later retracted their involvement. Aujla wrote that the incident was a rumour. In November 2019, the leader of the Punjab-based gang, Sukhpreet Budda, was arrested by Interpol in Armenia for relations to the gang attack.

In an interview with The Hollywood Reporter India, Aujla revealed that he has been experiencing multiple extortion calls and death threats while living in Surrey, British Columbia, culminating in him acquiring a possession and acquisition licence.

In 2023, Aujla moved with his family to the United Arab Emirates, settling in Dubai, following another attack on his property in Canada.

== Controversies ==
=== Feuds ===
Aujla had a well-known public rivalry with fellow rapper Sidhu Moose Wala. Both had been taking shots at each other via their songs and both the artists have been criticised for songs promoting violence. Elly Mangat, who had previously worked with both the artists, disclosed in an interview that the dispute began when Sidhu's video targeting Aujla in his song was leaked to Aujla's management, and they threatened to attack Sidhu. Following the incident, both started targeting each other on social media. The rivalry was resolved temporarily until Karan Aujla released a track called "Lafaafe" with Sanam Bhullar. Followed by this, Moose Wala released his diss track "Warning Shots" featuring Sunny Malton, claiming Aujla's song was about him. Subsequently, Aujla stated in an interview that he didn't write the track "Lafaafe", and refused to comment further regarding their rivalry. In 2022, after Moose Wala's death, Aujla paid tribute to him with the song "Maa".

=== Complaints in India ===
On numerous occasions while performing in India, Aujla has received complaints by locals and authorities regarding his lyrics and stage demeanor.

In February 2020, Chandigarh Police advised him not to sing any of his songs promoting violence, guns or drugs during his concert at DAV College, Chandigarh. Aujla complied.

In September 2021, after the release of his debut album Bacthafucup (B.T.F.U.), a complaint was filed by the Punjab State Commission For Women over the song "Sharab", against himself, Harjit Harman and the record label, Speed Records for comparing women to alcohol, drugs and guns in the song. Later the issue was resolved through communication with the complainant.

On 2 December 2024, ahead of his show in Chandigarh, Pandit Rao Dharennavar, a resident of Chandigarh, filed a police complaint against Karan Aujla, accusing him of promoting harmful content and encouraging alcohol, drugs, and violence through his songs. He asked him to refrain from performing tracks like "Chitta Kurta," "Adhia," "Few Days," "Alcohol 2," "Gangsta," and "Bandook" during his Chandigarh show.

In August 2025, The Punjab State Commission for Women issued a suo motu notice, taking serious note of the use of "objectionable language" in his song, "MF Gabhru!" and summoned him to appear before the commission.

== Other ventures ==
=== Hukam clothing ===
Aujla launched his own clothing brand named "Hukam Clothing" on 25 November 2021.

=== Apple Music Up Next Program ===
Karan Aujla produced a short film as a part of the global initiative Apple Music Up Next. It was released through Apple Music alongside his EP Four Me in 2024.

=== Two EPs, One Room ===
In September 2026, he organised an exhibition, "Two EPs, One Room", to reveal the artworks of his upcoming EP duology, Aujla SZN 1 and Aujla SZN 2, ahead of their release, in Nexus Select Citywalk, New Delhi. The venue had a vintage monitor showcasing B-roll footage from music videos and a diary with lyrics to one of the songs handwritten in Punjabi by Aujla.

== Discography ==
Studio albums

- Bacthafucup (2021)
- Making Memories (2023)
- P-Pop Culture (2025)

Collaborative albums

- Street Dreams (with Divine) (2024)

== Accolades ==
Award	Year (Note: Indicates the year of ceremony. Each year is linked to the article about the awards held that year, wherever possible.)	Recipient(s) and nominee(s)	Category	Result	Ref.
Gaana User's Choice Icons	2019	Karan Aujla	Best Singer - Male	Nominated	
PTC Punjabi Music Awards	2020	"Don't Look"	Most Popular Song of the Year	Nominated	
PTC Punjabi Music Awards	2020	"Don't Look"	Best New Age Sensation	Won	
PTC Punjabi Music Awards	2020	Karan Aujla and Gurlez Akhtar (for "Chitta Kurta")	Best Duet Vocalists	Nominated	
Juno Awards	2024	Karan Aujla	Breakthrough Artist of the Year	Nominated	
Juno Awards	2024	Karan Aujla	Fan Choice Award	Won	
