= Ajj Aakhaan Waris Shah Nu =

Punjabi-language poetic dirge by Amrita Pritam

- by Amrita Pritam
- Original title: ਅੱਜ ਆਖਾਂ ਵਾਰਸ ਸ਼ਾਹ ਨੂੰ
- Language: Punjabi
- Publication date: 1948

Ajj Aakhaan Waris Shah Nu (Punjabi: اَج آکھاں وارث شاہ نُوں, ਅੱਜ ਆਖਾਂ ਵਾਰਸ ਸ਼ਾਹ ਨੂੰ, romanized: Ajj ākhāṁ Vāris Śāh nūṁ; transl. 'Today, I Say Unto Waris Shah' or 'Today, I Invoke Waris Shah') is a Punjabi-language poetic dirge by Punjabi author Amrita Pritam about the horrors of Punjab's partition during the 1947 partition of India. The poem is addressed to the 18th-century Punjabi poet Waris Shah, who wrote the most popular version of the Punjabi romance tragedy, Heer Ranjha. It appeals to Waris Shah to arise from his grave, record the Punjab's tragedy and turn over a new page in Punjab's history.

== Summary ==
In the poem the poet invokes Waris Shah, a historic Punjabi poet, who wrote a popular version of the Punjabi romance tragedy Heer Ranjha. Pritam asks him to witness and record the miserable condition of Punjab and its people after its partition in 1947 and start a new page of his book of love. In the story of Heer Ranjha, Shah narrated the misery of a woman (Heer), but a million of daughters of Punjab, Pritam feels, were crying to Shah.

The fields are lined up with dead bodies, and the Chenab is filled with blood. Someone unknown poured poison in the water of the five rivers, and the deadly water is destroying the land. The land, which used to be fertile, is sprouting venom, and the sky has turned red from endless cries and tears.

== Lyrics ==
These are the lyrics of the poem:

Punjabi - Gurmukhi script

ਅੱਜ ਆਖਾਂ ਵਾਰਸ ਸ਼ਾਹ ਨੂੰ ਕਿਤੋਂ ਕਬਰਾਂ ਵਿਚੋਂ ਬੋਲ।
ਤੇ ਅੱਜ ਕਿਤਾਬੇ ਇਸ਼ਕ ਦਾ ਕੋਈ ਅਗਲਾ ਵਰਕਾ ਫੋਲ।
ਇਕ ਰੋਈ ਸੀ ਧੀ ਪੰਜਾਬ ਦੀ ਤੂੰ ਲਿਖ ਲਿਖ ਮਾਰੇ ਵੈਣ।
ਅਜ ਲੱਖਾਂ ਧੀਆਂ ਰੋਂਦੀਆਂ ਤੈਨੂ ਵਾਰਸ ਸ਼ਾਹ ਨੂੰ ਕਹਿਣ।
ਉੱਠ ਦਰਦਮੰਦਾਂ ਦਿਆ ਦਰਦੀਆ ਉੱਠ ਤੱਕ ਆਪਣਾ ਪੰਜਾਬ।
ਅਜ ਬੇਲੇ ਲਾਸ਼ਾਂ ਵਿਛੀਆਂ ਤੇ ਲਹੂ ਦੀ ਭਰੀ ਚਨਾਬ।
ਕਿਸੇ ਨੇ ਪੰਜਾਂ ਪਾਣੀਆਂ ਵਿੱਚ ਦਿੱਤੀ ਜ਼ਹਿਰ ਰਲ੍ਹਾ
ਤੇ ਉਹਨਾ ਪਾਣੀਆਂ ਧਰਤ ਨੂੰ ਦਿੱਤਾ ਪਾਣੀ ਲਾ

ਇਸ ਜ਼ਰਖੇਜ਼ ਜ਼ਮੀਨ ਦੇ ਲੂੰ ਲੂੰ ਫੁਟਿਆ ਜ਼ਹਿਰ
ਗਿਠ ਗਿਠ ਚੜ੍ਹੀਆਂ ਲਾਲੀਆਂ ਫੁੱਟ ਫੁੱਟ ਚੜ੍ਹਿਆ ਕਹਿਰ
ਵਿਹੁ ਵਲਿੱਸੀ ਵਾ ਫਿਰ ਵਣ ਵਣ ਵੱਗੀ ਜਾ
ਉਹਨੇ ਹਰ ਇਕ ਵਾਂਸ ਦੀ ਵੰਝਲੀ ਦਿੱਤੀ ਨਾਗ ਬਣਾ

ਪਹਿਲਾ ਡੰਗ ਮਦਾਰੀਆਂ ਮੰਤ੍ਰ ਗਏ ਗੁਆਚ
ਦੂਜੇ ਡੰਗ ਦੀ ਲੱਗ ਗਈ ਜਣੇ ਖਣੇ ਨੂੰ ਲਾਗ
ਲਾਗਾਂ ਕੀਲੇ ਲੋਕ ਮੂੰਹ ਬੱਸ ਫਿਰ ਡੰਗ ਹੀ ਡੰਗ
ਪਲੋ ਪਲੀ ਪੰਜਾਬ ਦੇ ਨੀਲੇ ਪੈ ਗਏ ਅੰਗ

ਗਲਿਓਂ ਟੁੱਟੇ ਗੀਤ ਫਿਰ ਤ੍ਰਕਲਿਓਂ ਟੁੱਟੀ ਤੰਦ
ਤ੍ਰਿੰਜਣੋ ਟੁੱਟੀਆਂ ਸਹੇਲੀਆਂ ਚਰੱਖੜੇ ਘੂਕਰ ਬੰਦ
ਸਣੇ ਸੇਜ ਦੇ ਬੇੜੀਆਂ ਲੁੱਡਣ ਦਿੱਤੀਆਂ ਰੋੜ੍ਹ
ਸਣੇ ਡਾਲੀਆਂ ਪੀਂਘ ਅੱਜ ਪਿੱਪਲਾਂ ਦਿੱਤੀ ਤੋੜ

ਜਿਥੇ ਵਜਦੀ ਸੀ ਫੂਕ ਪਿਆਰ ਦੀ ਵੇ ਉਹ ਵੰਝਲੀ ਗਈ ਗੁਆਚ
ਰਾਂਝੇ ਦੇ ਸਭ ਵੀਰ ਅੱਜ ਭੁੱਲ ਗਏ ਉਸਦੀ ਜਾਚ
ਧਰਤੀ ਤੇ ਲਹੂ ਵੱਸਿਆ ਕਬਰਾਂ ਪਈਆਂ ਚੋਣ
ਪ੍ਰੀਤ ਦੀਆਂ ਸ਼ਾਹਜ਼ਾਦੀਆਂ ਅੱਜ ਵਿੱਚ ਮਜ਼ਾਰਾਂ ਰੋਣ

ਅੱਜ ਸੱਭੇ ਕੈਦੋ ਬਣ ਗਏ, ਹੁਸਨ ਇਸ਼ਕ ਦੇ ਚੋਰ
ਅੱਜ ਕਿਥੋਂ ਲਿਆਈਏ ਲੱਭ ਕੇ ਵਾਰਿਸ ਸ਼ਾਹ ਇਕ ਹੋਰ

ਅੱਜ ਆਖਾਂ ਵਾਰਸ ਸ਼ਾਹ ਨੂੰ ਤੂੰਹੇਂ ਕਬਰਾਂ ਵਿਚੋਂ ਬੋਲ!
ਤੇ ਅੱਜ ਕਿਤਾਬੇ ਇਸ਼ਕ ਦਾ ਕੋਈ ਅਗਲਾ ਵਰਕਾ ਫੋਲ!

Punjabi - Shahmukhi script

اجّ آکھاں وارث شاہ نوں، کِتوں قبراں وِچّوں بول!
تے اجّ کتابِ عشق دا کوئی اگلا ورقہ پھول!
اِک روئی سی دھی پنجاب دی، توں لِکھ لِکھ مارے وَیݨ
اجّ لکّھاں دھیاں روندیاں ،تینوں وارث شاہ نوں کہݨ:

اُٹھ دردمنداں دیئا دردِیا! اُٹھ تکّ اپݨا پنجاب
اجّ بیلے لاشاں وِچھیاں تے لہو دی بھری چناب
کِسے نے پنجاں پاݨیاں وچ دِتی زہر رلؕا
تے اوہناں پاݨیاں دھرت نوں دِتا پاݨی لا

اِس زرخیز زمین دے لُوں لُوں پُھٹیا زہر
گِٹھ گِٹھ چڑھیاں لالِیاں ،پُھٹ پُھٹ چڑھیا قہر
وِہو ولِسّی وا پھر وݨ وݨ وگّی جا
اوہنے ہر اِک وانس دی ونجھلی دِتّی ناگ بݨا

پہلا ڈنگ مداریاں، منتر گئے گواچ
دوجے ڈنگ دی لگّ گئی جݨے کھݨے نوں لاگ
لاگاں کِیلے لوک مونہہ، بس پھر ڈنگ ہی ڈنگ
پلو پلی پنجاب دے نیلے پَے گئے انگ

گلیؤں ٹُٹے گیت پھر، ترَکلیئوں ٹُٹی تند
ترِنجݨو ٹُٹیاں سہیلیاں، چرکھڑے گُھوکر بند
سݨے سیج دے بیڑیاں لُڈݨ دِتیاں روڑھ
سݨے ڈالیاں پینگھ اجّ پِپلاں دِتی توڑ

جِتّھے وجدی سی پُھوک پیار دی، اوہ ونجھلی گئی گواچ
رانجھے دے سبھ وِیر اجّ بُھل گئے اُسدی جاچ
دھرتی تے لہو وسّیا، قبراں پئیاں چوݨ
پریت دیاں شاہزادیاں اجّ وِچّ مزاراں روݨ

اجّ سبّھے قیدو بݨ گئے، حسن عشق دے چور
اجّ کِتھوں لیائیئے لبّھ کے وارث شاہ اِک ہور

اجّ آکھاں وارث شاہ نوں، توں ہی قبراں وِچوں بول!
تے اجّ کتابِ عشق دا کوئی اگلا ورقہ پھول!

The poem was also translated into English by Amrita Pritam herself.

== In popular culture ==
The poem found resonance in both Punjabs - Indian and Pakistani. It featured in the Pakistani Punjabi film, Kartar Singh, where it was performed by Inayat Hussain Bhatti. It is one of the most widely read poems in modern Indian literature.

Pakistani band, Mekaal Hasan Band included a 7-minute, 27 second song "Waris Shah" on their albums Sampooran and Saptak. Javed Bashir was the vocalist. The band also released an animated video for this song, which was directed by Zeeshan Pervaiz.

== See also ==
- Indian Poetry
