= Mohanjit =

Indian poet

Dr. Mohanjit is a Punjabi poet. He won the Sahitya Akademi Award in 2018 for his poetry collection Kone Da Suraj.

== Biography ==
Mohanjit is from village Adliwala, Amritsar district, Punjab, India. His first poems were published in 1956. During the Indo-Pakistani war of 1971, his writings were published in Nagmani magazine under the title ‘Dispatches from the Western Front’.

He is based in Delhi and was a lecturer at the Delhi University's Deshbandhu College.

He won the Sahitya Akademi Award for the poetry collection Kone Da Suraj in 2018. In 2020, he announced that he had returned his award in support of the 2020-2021 Indian farmers' protest.

== Sahitya Akademi Award controversy ==
Mohanjit said that he got the award at the late age of 80 because the gang that was controlling the Punjabi Sahitya Akademi Award was opposed to him.

== Works ==
=== Collections of poems ===
- Sehkada Shehir
- Ohle Ch Ojiara
- Kone Da Suraj
