= Legacy of the British Raj =

Impact of 1858–1947 colonial rule in India

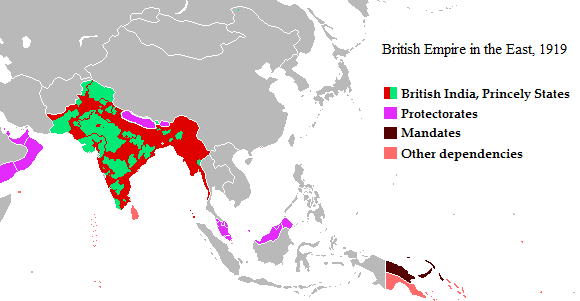
1. Afghanistan • 2. Bhutan • 3. Nepal • 4. Oman • 5. UAE • 6. Yemen • 7. Bahrain • 8. Qatar • 9. Malaysia 10. Singapore • 11. Brunei • 12. India • 13. Pakistan 14. Myanmar 15. Bangladesh

The British Raj left a significant impact on the Indian subcontinent, Southeast Asia and Middle East, and through the region's role in the British Empire, on the world. There are total of 15 countries that were part of the erstwhile British Raj, together as post-British Raj states.

Following the partition of the Raj, the post-British Raj states and the international community de jure and de facto, recognized India as the actual continuator state to the British Raj as a whole, because both the countries share a common rules and law in terms of administration, army and asset formation, religion, UN and UNSC membership and position etc. Other states (including Pakistan) were recognized only as successor states only in terms of land. All other 14 states, except India, are considered only successor states but not continuator states.

== History ==
=== Colonial era ===
The Indians will, I hope, soon stand in the same position towards us in which we once stood towards the Romans. [...] From being obstinate enemies, the Britons soon became attached and confiding friends; and they made more strenuous efforts to retain the Romans, than their ancestors had done to resist their invasion.

— Sir Charles Trevelyan (1838)

Colonial officials in British India, faced with an unprecedented task in governing an unfamiliar and vast land, often referred back to their own European history to adjudge how to leave a positive legacy behind in India. In deciding and justifying policy, they often made references to the impact of the Roman Empire in ancient Britain.

=== Contemporary era ===
Upon India's independence, British Prime Minister Clement Attlee dubbed India the "Light of Asia", implying that it would act as a model of liberal democracy. He described a variety of positive contributions made by the British to India's future, ranging from the economic to the societal. India then further separated from British involvement in 1950 by becoming a republic.

== Economic impact ==
The English language serves as a distinguishing feature in India's modern economic life, with Indian men who speak fluent English earning 34% higher hourly salaries than men who don't speak English.

=== Science and technology ===
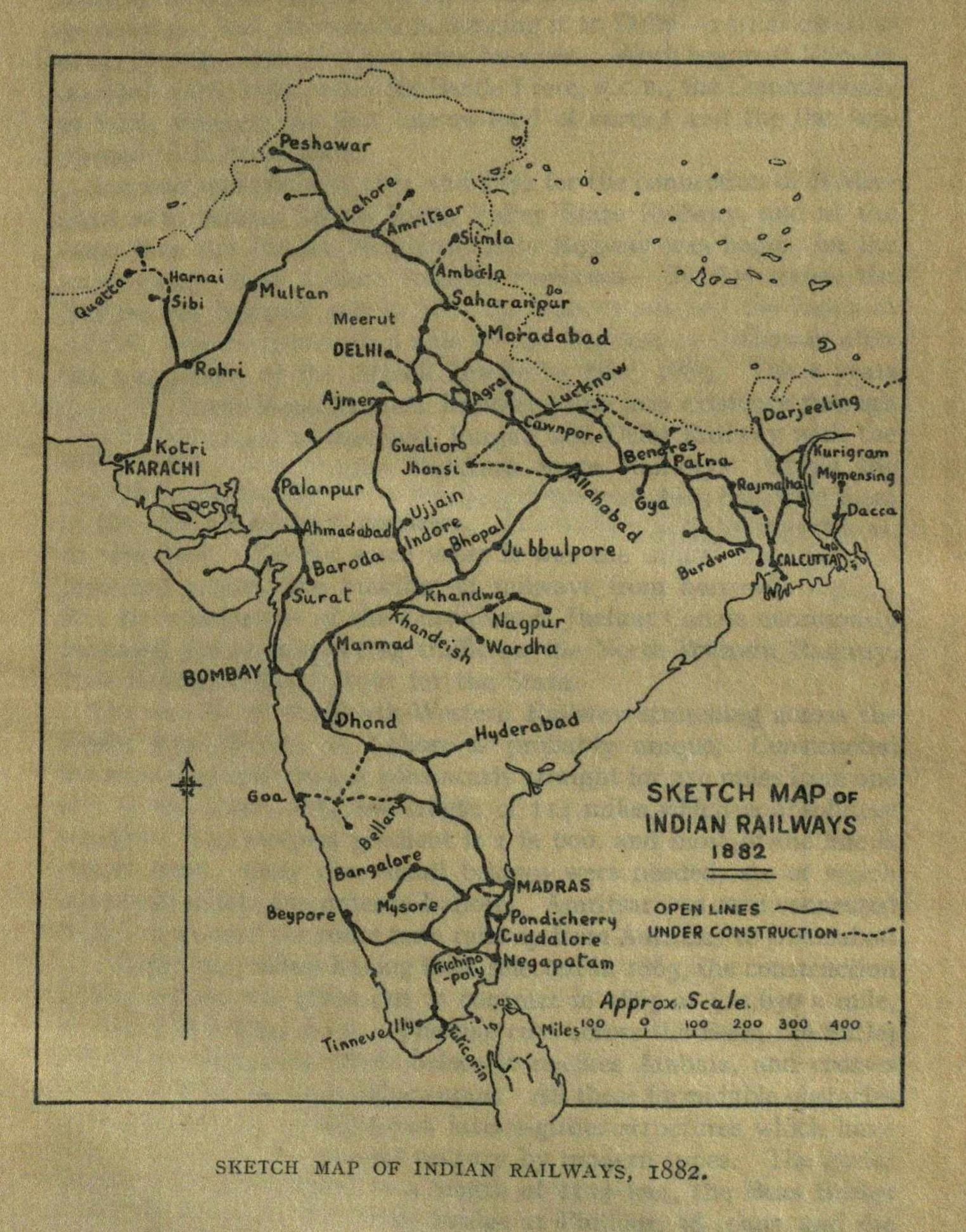
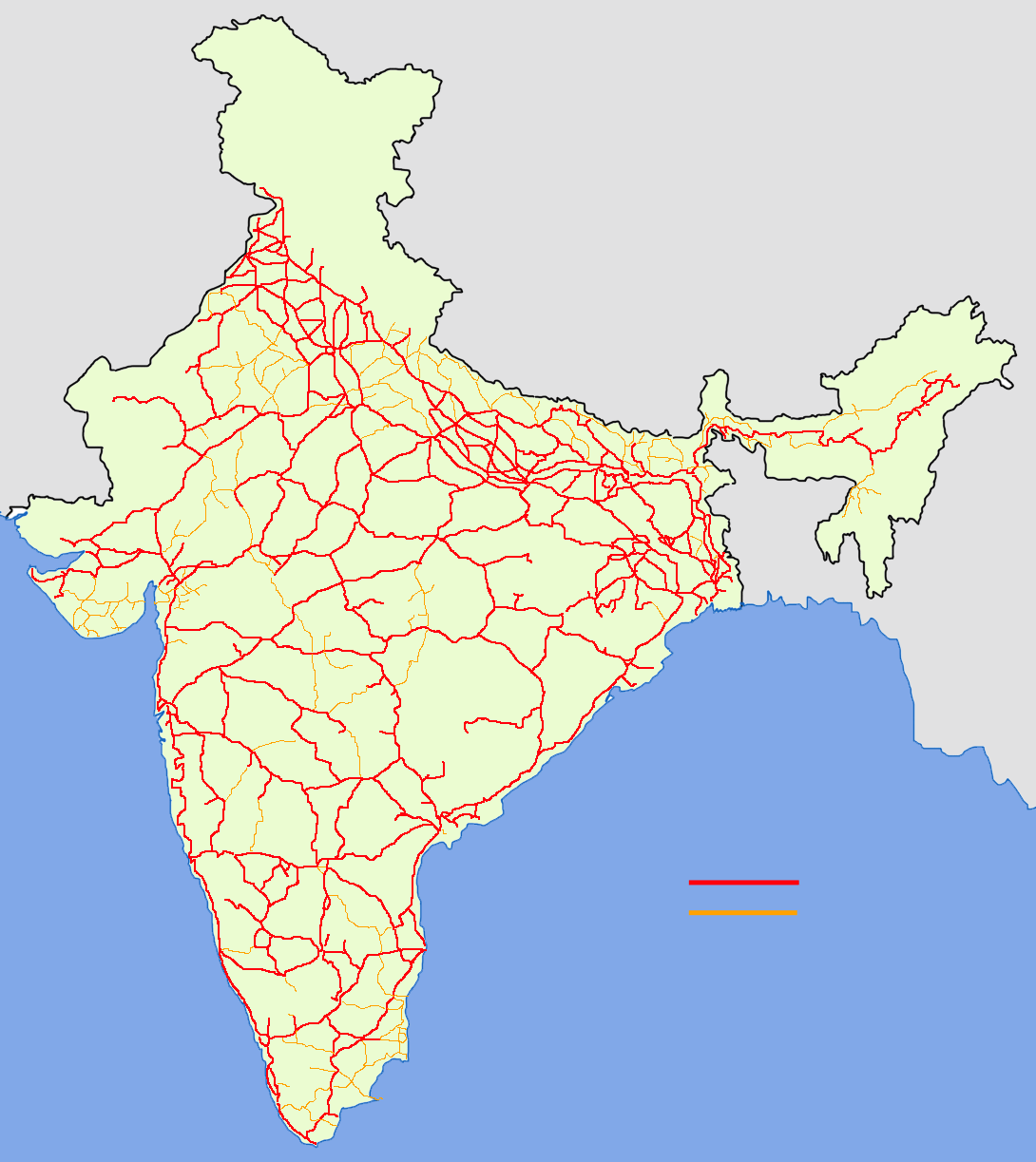
The Indian railways in 1882 (left) and 2005

Revenues from British trade with India played a significant role in funding the Industrial Revolution in UK.

The British-built railways transformed Indian society in a number of ways, allowing for new forms of transregional and international commerce to emerge. However, the British banned Indians from manufacturing their own locomotive technology in 1912; this meant that Indians had to re-learn this craft from the British after independence in 1947. Indian Railways, a state company in postcolonial India, is now one of the world's biggest employers.

== Ideological impact ==
The Indian administrative apparatus was initially created by the British. The Indian Penal Code (IPC), instituted in the colonial era, went on to serve as the foundation for legal codes passed by the British in several of their other colonies.

=== Religion ===
Christianity began to be perceived negatively by many Indians during British rule, as it was seen as part of the imperialist project. However, aspects of Christianity, such as its emphasis on monotheism, influenced Hindu beliefs. Christian pacifism also found indirect expression in the Indian Independence movement, with Gandhi having held an appreciation of Jesus and certain passages from the Bible.

Islamic legacies in India also came to be perceived more negatively, as the British, influenced by their European Christian history of conflict with Muslims and also seeking to justify their control of India, portrayed the Indo-Muslim period in a more negative light and made themselves out to be the saviours of the Hindu community. In the aftermath of Partition, independent India's historians sought to downplay atrocities in the Indo-Muslim period to maintain communal harmony, though with the rise of Hindu nationalism in the 21st century, the negative aspects of the Indo-Muslim period came to be focused on to a disproportionate extent.

Zinkin argues that certain British political ideologies took root even among Hindu nationalists in the Bharatiya Janata Party, which specifically emphasises Hindu traditions.

== Geopolitical impact ==
Mughal India (left), British India (centre - including princely states), and present-day India (right)

One major change in India was the rejection of its former separate princely states; British India, which became the modern nations of India, Pakistan, and Bangladesh, encompassed more territory than its pan-Indian predecessor, Mughal India. The formation of British India and its frontiers was accompanied by a conscious policy of creating buffer states that could shield against rivals such as the Russian Empire; this elevated the concept of buffer states to international vogue in the 1880s.

British India's record of helping the British Empire expand plays a role in the deterioration of modern China–India relations, as Chinese strategists were wary of postcolonial India attempting to resume an outsized role in Asia. Negative Afghanistan–Pakistan relations also trace back to the extension of British India's borders into Pashtunistan.

=== Military ===
The British introduced the idea of separating the political and military spheres of government into South Asia; however, this did not remain in effect in the post-independent Pakistan.

Throughout history, India had mainly faced threats of land-based invasion, which meant that it did not have a naval focus until the colonial era, when the British took steps to guard the maritime routes to India. The Royal Indian Navy's size was restricted during that time to reduce the chance of a mutiny; in the first few decades of India's independence, the Indian Navy was still dependent on the United Kingdom for training and support. However, lack of Western support during the Cold War then pushed India toward the Soviet Union for help in building its navy. Only in the aftermath of the Cold War, during which India had been concentrated on land-based threats from its neighbours Pakistan and China and had been maintaining its nonalignment policy in the Indian Ocean, did the Indian Navy become more important to the country's military planning.

== Demographic impact ==
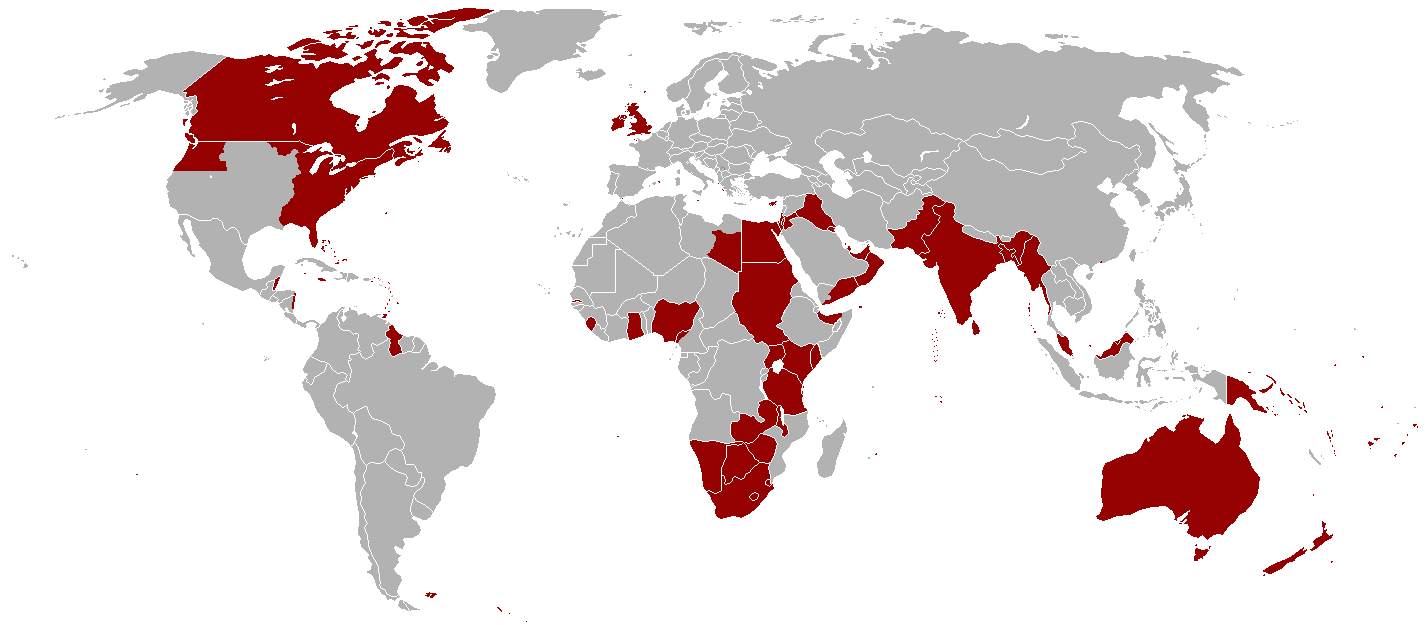
The Indian diaspora (left) is substantially based in former British colonies (right); this influenced India to maintain ties to them through Commonwealth membership

Much of the roots of the modern South Asian diaspora can be traced to British India, as the British relied on merchants, indentured labourers, and other groups of Indians to expand the British Empire.

=== Communal relations ===
The introduction of census-based demography and electoral politics in the colonial era, along with the increase in reservation quotas for lower castes after independence, played a substantial role in defining religious and caste-based identities in modern India. Ideas around race, which were used in the colonial era to explain the vast European empires and the apparent long-term downfall of India, factored into the martial race theory and further social categorisations.

The 1947 Partition of India, cleaving the Muslim- and non-Muslim-majority regions of British India, resulted in 15 million people migrating between the newly independent nations of India and Pakistan, which is the largest mass migration in human history.

== Cultural impact ==
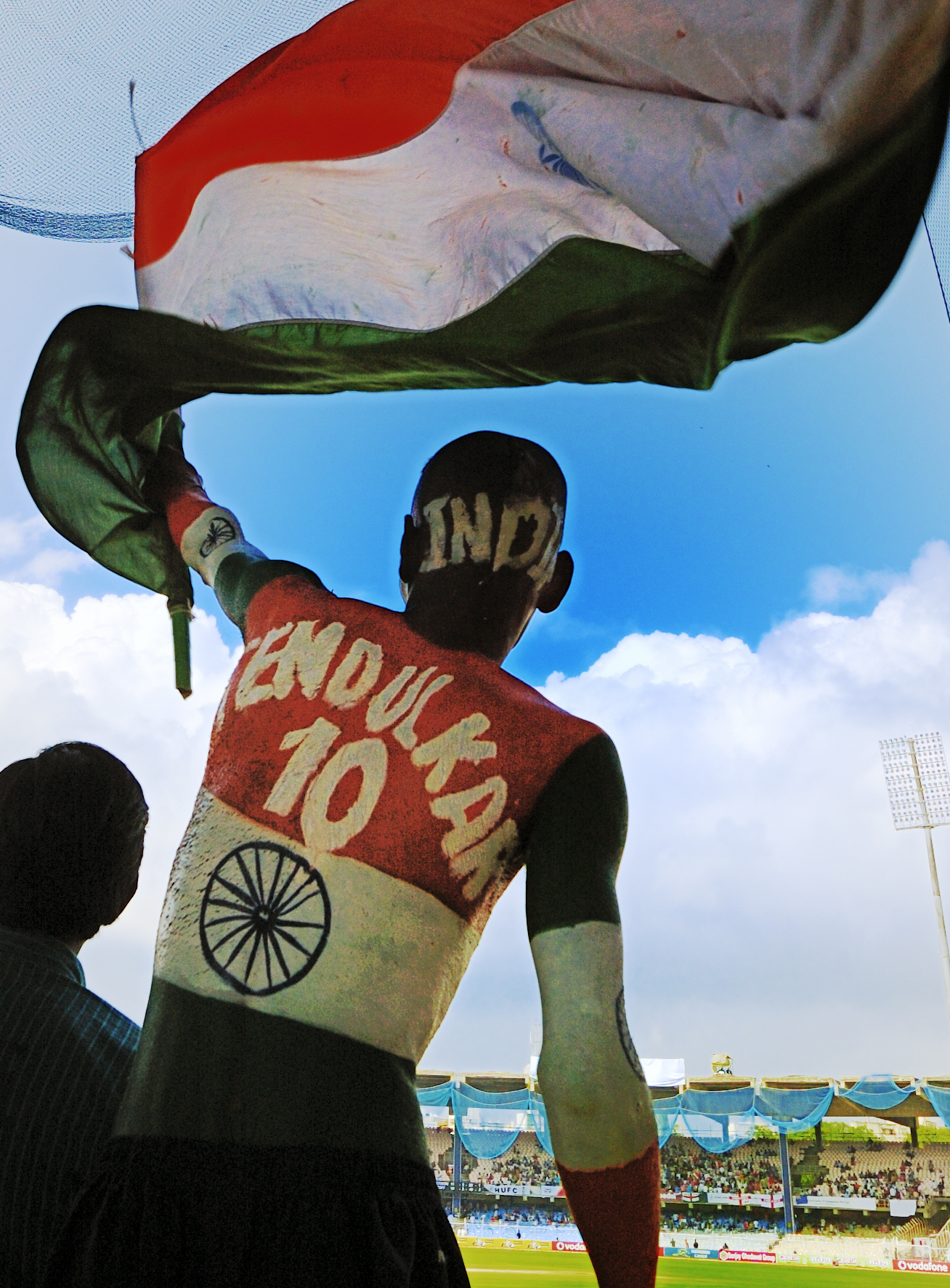
A supporter of the Indian cricket team at a match. Cricket, a British-origin sport, has been described as a major unifying force in South Asia

The British colonisation of India influenced South Asian culture noticeably. The most noticeable influence is the English language which emerged as the administrative and lingua franca of India and Pakistan (and which also greatly influenced the native South Asian languages; see also: South Asian English) followed by the blend of native and gothic/sarcenic architecture. Similarly, the influence of the South Asian languages and culture can be seen on Britain, too; for example, many Indian words entering the English language, and also the adoption of South Asian cuisine.

Modern Indian attitudes around sexuality have become more rigid since the colonial era due to the absorption of Victorian-era British Christian ideas around the modesty of the body.

British sports (particularly hockey early on, but then largely replaced by cricket in recent decades, with football also popular in certain regions of the subcontinent) were cemented as part of South Asian culture during the British Raj, with the local games having been overtaken in popularity but also standardised by British influences. Elements of Indian physical culture, such as Indian clubs, also made their way to the United Kingdom.

British archaeologists and cultural enthusiasts played a significant role during the colonial era in rediscovering and publicising some of India's pre-Islamic heritage, which had begun to disappear during the Indo-Muslim period, as well as preserving some of the Mughal monuments.

== See also ==
- Legacy of the British Empire
