= Anglo-Indian (disambiguation) =

Anglo-Indian is a term used to refer to a community of people of mixed British and Indian ancestry. Historically, these people were called "Eurasian" and "Anglo-Indian" meant people of European descent born in India.

Anglo-Indian may also refer to language topics such as:

- Indian English
- Regional differences and dialects in Indian English
- Hinglish
- Indian English literature
- List of English words of Indian origin
- List of English words of Persian origin

Anglo-Indian may also refer to:

- Britons in India
- Anglo-Indian wars
- India–United Kingdom relations
- Anglo-Indian Canadian
- Anglo-Indian cuisine
