= Andholan =

Studio album by Mekaal Hasan Band
- Released: September 17, 2014
- Genre: Alternative rock Jazz fusion Sufi rock
- Length: 42:20
- Label: Times Music
- Producer: Mekaal Hasan

Mekaal Hasan Band chronology
Saptak (2009)	Andholan (2014)

Andholan is the third album by the Indo-Pak band, Mekaal Hasan Band, after Sampooran (2004) and Saptak (2009). This album was released in 2014, by Times Music.

== Release ==
Mekaal Hasan Band started working on the album in 2013. At first, MHB's old vocalist Javed Bashir was to be the vocalist on the album. Later, Mekaal confirmed that Javed Bashir would not be a part of the album. Instead, the album would feature a new line-up with new band members, with Sharmistha Chatterjee as the lead vocalist. The album was released on iTunes on 17 September 2014. The physical CDs were released soon after.

== Track listing ==
1. Ghunghat
2. Champakalli
3. Bheem
4. Sayon
5. Maalkauns
6. Sindhi
7. Megh
8. Kinarey

== Album description ==
Andholan contains eight tracks and is described in this way on the band's official website:

When a multinational group with eclectic influences gears up to put out an album, you can bet that it'll be a masterpiece of a release. Mekaal Hasan Band's (MHB's) third studio album, Andholan is the first release of theirs to feature a new and improved Indo-Pak line-up that features the recorded debut and introduction of Indian singer, Sharmistha Chatterjee on lead vocals. Mekaal Hasan and Mohammad Ahsan Papu, who were the founding members of this critically acclaimed music group, reprise their roles as lead guitarist and flautist, respectively, with Indian heavyweights and band members Gino Banks and Shledon D'Silva joining them on their live performances. The innovative songwriting process that went into the making of this album incorporates the sounds of classic jazz-rock groups from the 70's, classical/Sufi music melodies and a dash of rock fusion to make this a thoroughly exquisite album. From the adrenalin-pumping introductory song "Ghungat" to the tranquility-evoking, conclusive track "Kinarey", this album will leave you in a state of spellbinding bliss.

== Personnel ==
- Mekaal Hasan - Guitar
- Ahsan Papu - Flute
- Sheldon D'Silva - Bass
- Gino Banks - Drums
- Sharmistha Chatterjee - Vocals
