= Saptak (album) =

Studio album by Mekaal Hasan Band
- Released: October 16, 2009
- Recorded: 2006–2008 at Digital Fidelity Studio in Lahore, Pakistan
- Genres: Alternative rock Jazz fusion Sufi rock
- Length: 35:22
- Labels: EMI, MHB Music
- Producer: Mekaal Hasan

Mekaal Hasan Band chronology
Sampooran (2004)	Saptak (2009)	Andholan (2014)

Singles from Saptak
- 1. "Jhok Ranjhan" Released: January 1, 2006; 2. "Andholan" Released: October 24, 2006; 3. "Huns Dhun" Released: October 28, 2007; 4. "Chal Bulleya" Released: October 2, 2009

Saptak (Urdu: سپتاک, literal English translation: "gamut") is the second studio album by the Pakistani rock band, Mekaal Hasan Band, released in October 2009. The album also contained the hit track "Chal Bulleya", and new versions of a couple of songs from the previous MHB album Sampooran.

== Track listing ==
All music composed by Mekaal Hasan Band.

Saptak
No.	Title	Writer(s)	Length
1.	"Chal Bulleya"	Bulleh Shah	4:30
2.	"Bandeya"		4:46
3.	"Ranjha"		4:00
4.	"Jhok Ranjhan"	Shah Hussain	4:25
5.	"Sanwal"	Farhat Abbas Shah	4:43
6.	"Bhageshwari"		4:46
7.	"Huns Dhun"		5:21
8.	"Waris Shah"	Amrita Pritam	7:27
9.	"Andholan"		6:23
10.	"Mahi"		6: 28
11.	"Albaella"		9:57

== Personnel ==
All information is taken from the CD.

Mekaal Hasan Band

- Mekaal Hasan – lead guitar
- Javed Bashir – lead vocals
- Mohammad Ahsan Papu – flute

Additional musicians

- Drums: John "Gumby" Louis Pinto
- Drums & Percussion on "Albaella" by Pete Lockett
- Drums & Percussion on "Andholan" & "Huns Dhun" by Javed Akhtar
- Guitars and Bass: Amir Azhar

Production

- Produced by Mekaal Hasan
- Recorded & Mixed at Digital Fidelity Studio, Lahore, Punjab
- Guitar sound engineer: Mekaal Hasan
- Assisted by Adnan Peter Gill
- Album artwork by Mehreen Murtaza
