= Javed Bashir =

Pakistani playback singer

- جاوید بشیر
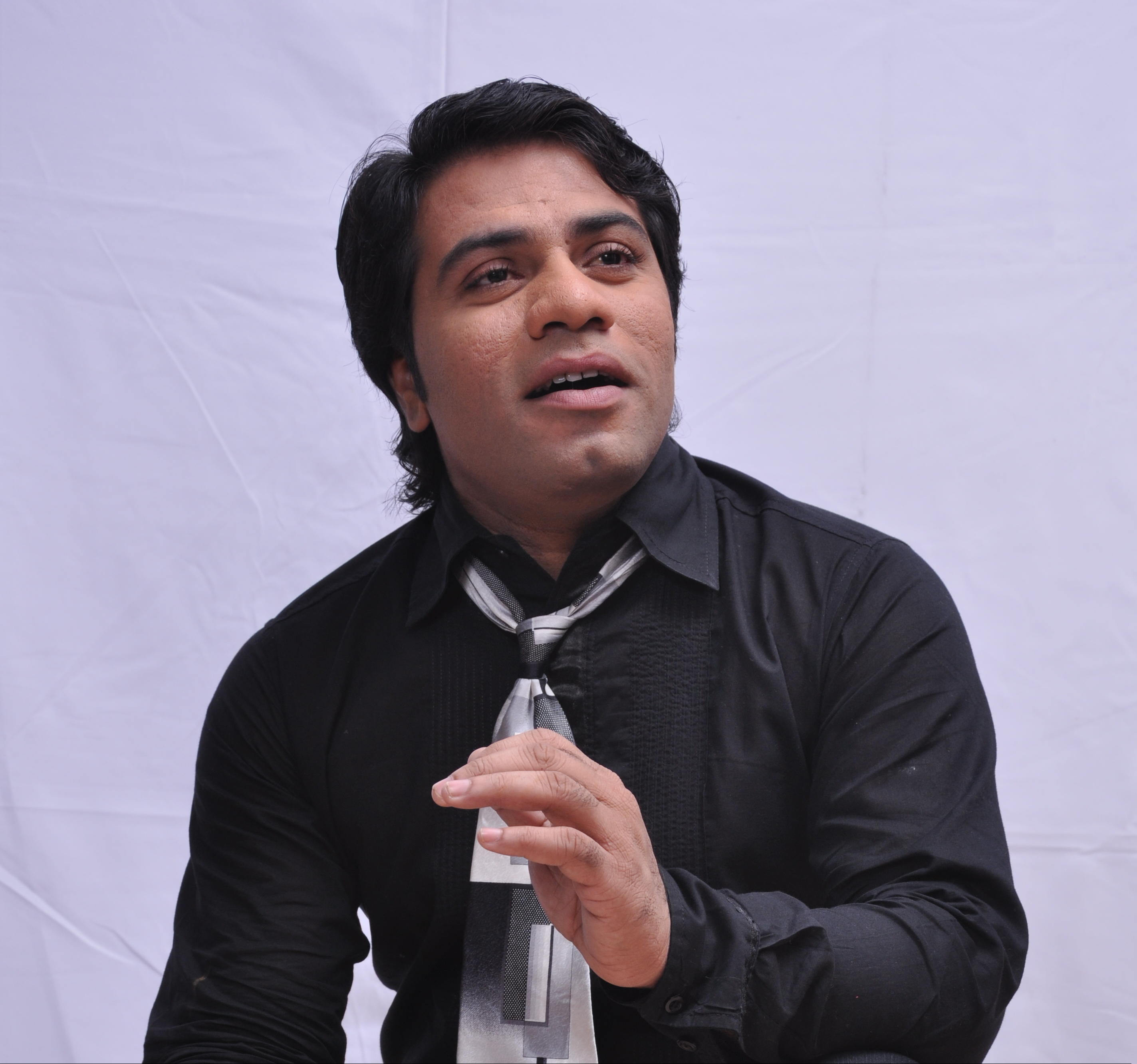
- Born: 8 August 1973 (age 53); Lahore, Punjab, Pakistan
- Occupations: Singer of: Sufi music; qawwali; classical; pop; rock
- Years active: 2001–present
- Notable credits: Mekaal Hasan Band; Shankar–Ehsaan–Loy; Pritam Chakraborty; Coke Studio Pakistan (Season 2); Coke Studio Pakistan (Season 7); Coke Studio Pakistan (season 9); Coke Studio Pakistan (season 10); Sanjay Leela Bhansali; Vishal–Shekhar; Alhamra Unplugged Season 2

Javed Bashir (Punjabi, Urdu: جاوید بشیر; born 8 August 1973) is a Pakistani playback singer who mainly sings classical songs. Javed has sung songs for many Bollywood movies including Cocktail, Kahaani, Rush, Bombay Talkies, Bhaag Milkha Bhaag, Once Upon ay Time in Mumbai Dobaara! and Bajirao Mastani.

== Early life ==
Javed Bashir's parents moved from Jalandhar, Punjab, India, to Pakistan during the Partition in 1947.

Though he has been singing since childhood, the professional training of qawwali began from 1992 with his father Ustad Bashir Ahmed Khan, himself a well-known qawwal. Javed Bashir also took classical vocal training from his paternal uncle Ustad Mubarak Ali Khan. His younger brother Akbar Ali is a qawwal as well, and both have performed together, notably for the season 10 of Coke Studio Pakistan, with the song "Naina Moray".

== Music career ==
Javed Bashir started his solo singing career in 2001 by singing his debut song "Deewane Nachde" from the album Anything But Silent by Bally Sagoo. Javed Bashir's lucky break came when Mekaal Hasan of the Mekaal Hasan Band called him on board to join his band. He was featured on Sampooran, the band's first full-length album in 2004, It landed Bashir mainstream success and appreciation. The band's popular song "Chal Bulleya" was released in 2009 from the album Saptak in collaboration with Mekaal Hasan Band. After the release of "Chal Bulleya", Javed and the band parted ways owing to differences on musical terms. Javed has since been working on a musical project for Indo-Pak peace in collaboration with Shankar Mahadevan.

== Discography ==
=== Coke Studio Pakistan ===
Season	Episode	Song	Artists	Composer	Music
2	1	"Aje Latha Naeeo"	Javed Bashir	Nusrat Fateh Ali Khan	Rohail Hyatt
2	3	"Chal Diyay"	Javed Bashir, Zeb & Haniya	Zeb & Haniya	Rohail Hyatt
2	5	"Rona Chhorr Dia"	Javed Bashir, Zeb & Haniya	Zeb & Haniya	Rohail Hyatt
7	2	"Charkha"	Javed Bashir	Javed Bashir	Strings
7	4	"Ambwa Talay"	Javed Bashir, Humera Channa	Javed Bashir	Strings
7	6	"Yaad"	Javed Bashir	Javed Bashir	Strings
9	1	"Aye Rah-e-Haq- Ke Shaheedo"	Javed Bashir & Others	Traditional	Strings
9	2	"Man Kunto Maula"	Javed Bashir & Ali Azmat	Jaffer Zaidi	Strings
9	5	"Jhalliya"	Javed Bashir & Masuma Anwar	Faakhir Mehmood	Strings
10	1	"Qaumi Taranah"	Javed Bashir & Others	Ahmed Ghulamali Chagla	Strings
10	4	"Naina Moray"	Javed Bashir & Akbar Ali	Traditional	Jaffer Zaidi

=== Albums and singles ===
Year	Song	Album / Single / Lyrics	Artist	Music / Composer
2001	"Deewane Nachde"	Album - Anything But Silent	Javed Bashir	Bally Sagoo
2001	"Naiyo Dil Lagda"	Album - Anything But Silent	Javed Bashir	Bally Sagoo
2002	"Nahin Tere Jeha Hor Disda"	Album - Simply Rich	Javed Bashir	Rishi Rich
2004	"Sampooran"	Full Album - Sampooran	Mekaal Hasan Band	Mekaal Hasan Band
2006	"Dialogue"	Full Album - Dialogue	Javed Bashir, Sondre Bratland	Javed Bashir, Sondre Bratland
2007	"Dil Da Tu Jaani"	Single feat. Jinx	Javed Bashir	Surinder Rattan
2009	"Saptak"	Full Album - Saptak	Mekaal Hasan Band	Mekaal Hasan Band
2010	"Tumhe Dillagi"	Album - Livewire	Javed Bashir	Amit Rai
2011	"Naina More"	Album - Subrang	Javed Bashir, Akbar Ali	Javed Bashir
2013	"Electro Mahiya"	Single	Javed Bashir	Panjabi Hit Squad
2015	"Akhan Ladiyan"	Single	Javed Bashir	J R Dread
2015	"Dholna"	Full Album - Dholna	Javed Bashir & Fariha Pervez	Sahir Ali Bagga
2015	"Jeene Nahi Diya"	Full Album - Jeene Nahi Diya	Javed Bashir & Fariha Pervez	Sahir Ali Bagga
2015	"Aao Ji"	Single	Javed Bashir & Fariha Pervez	Harpreet
2017	"MHB Andholan"	Full Album - Remastered Edition	Javed Bashir	Mekaal Hasan Band
2017	"Dil Say Pakistan"	Single	Javed Bashir, Haroon, Muniba Mazari & Farhan Bogra	Haroon & Shuja Haider
2017	"Yeh Hai Shaan-e-Pakistan"	Album - Shaan-e-Pakistan	Javed Bashir	Javed Bashir & Amir Azhar
2018	"Sufi Saroor"	Album - Sufi Saroor Album	Javed Bashir & Richa Sharma (singer)	Kanu Jimmy
2018	"Allah Hoo Haq Allah Hoo"	Single	Javed Bashir	Anthony Soshil
2018	"Ki Milya Teri Hoke"	Single	Javed Bashir & Akbar Ali	Jaidev Kumar
2018	"Maala"	Single	Javed Bashir	Anthony Soshil
2018	"Main Sadkay"	Single	Javed Bashir	Aditya Dev
2019	"Ya Allah" - Hamd	Single	Javed Bashir	Amir Azhar / Javed Bashir
2021	Balma (Thumri)	Sufi Score	Javed Bashir	Javed Bashir
2021	Thaiya the Fusion	Single	Javed Bashir & Sanam Marvi	Javed Bashir
2022	Haniya	Single	Javed Bashir	Roach Killa
2022	Salaam Salaam	Single	Rahat Fateh Ali Khan & Javed Bashir	Akbar Ali / Syed Ali Shahrukh
2022	Ya Ali (r.a) Tere Sadqe Jaavan	Single	Javed Bashir	Kamran Akhtar
2023	Dil Lagaya	Single	Javed Bashir	Amir Azhar
2023	Brixton Fish Fry	Single	Steve Mason & Javed Bashir	Steve Mason
2023	No More	Single	Steve Mason & Javed Bashir	Steve Mason
2023	Yaara	Single	Javed Bashir	Javed Bashir, Kamran Akhtar
2023	Ashak	Single	Javed Bashir	Javed Bashir, Amir Azhar
2023	Door Rehna	Single	Javed Bashir, Akbar Ali	Akbar Ali, Sonu Ali
2023	Jogi	Single	Javed Bashir	Javed Bashir, Kamran Akhtar
2024	Yaara (Groove Mix)	Single, Javed Bashir	Ustad Javed Bashir Khan	Javed Bashir & Shani Arshad
2024	Yaara Hindi (Thumri Mix)	Single, Karamat Ali Asad	Ustad Javed Bashir Khan	Javed Bashir & Shani Arshad
2024	Kuch Bhi Nahi	Single	Ustad Javed Bashir Khan	Javed Bashir & Zonaib
2024	Khamshi	Single, Jaun Elia	Ustad Javed Bashir Khan	Javed Bashir & Mujtaba Ali Choni
2024	Hum Tumharay Hain	Single, Jaun Elia	Ustad Javed Bashir Khan	Javed Bashir & Mujtaba Ali Choni
2024	Beqarari	Single, Jaun Elia	Ustad Javed Bashir Khan	Javed Bashir & Mujtaba Ali Choni
2024	Aajao	Single, Jaun Elia	Ustad Javed Bashir Khan	Javed Bashir & Mujtaba Ali Choni
2024	Tera Hijar	Single, Jaun Elia	Ustad Javed Bashir Khan	Javed Bashir & Amir Azhar
2024	Kuin Krain Ham	Single, Jaun Elia	Ustad Javed Bashir Khan	Javed Bashir & Daman
2024	Masjid Mandir	Single	Ustad Javed Bashir Khan	Javed Bashir & Shani Arshad
2025	Naat Sharif	Single	Ustad Javed Bashir Khan, Moman Bashir	Rakae & Kami Paul
2026	Naat Sharif	Single	Ustad Javed Bashir Khan	Kamran Akhter

=== Television and reality shows ===
Javed Bashir has also sung a couple of original sound tracks for Pakistani TV Serials.

Year	Song	Serial	Artist	Lyrics	Music director
2012	"Yaar-e-Man"	Aik Nayee Cindrella	Javed Bashir	Sabir Zafar	Amir Qureshi
2014	"Laa"	Laa	Javed Bashir	Sarmad Sehbai	Sahir Ali Bagga
2014	"Sard Makdiyon Ne"	Tare-Ankboot	Javed Bashir, Nandini Srikar	Faseeh Bari Khan	Sahir Ali Bagga
2016	"Rangreza"	Ghayal	Javed Bashir	Sabir Zafar	Asim Azhar & Qasim Azhar
2016	"Lagi Walay"	Bhai	Javed Bashir, Akbar Ali & Beena Khan	Traditional	Naveed Nashad
2017	"Dildar Ka Gham"	Zakham	Javed Bashir	Sabir Zafer	Waqar Ali
2019	"Ankh Uthi"	Ishq Zaat	Javed Bashir	Purnam Allahabadi	Imran Ali
2022	"Rabba Mere"	Ajani Records Season 1	Javed Bashir	Shahbaz Alig	Hussain Ajani
2024	"Charkha"	Akhara	Javed Bashir	Ahad Ali Siddiqui	Schumaila Rehmat Hussain, Faraz Rizvi
2025	"Pal Do Pal"	Pal Do Pal	Javed Bashir	Qamar Nashad	Naveed Nashad
2025	"Sanwal Yaar Piya"	Sanwal Yaar Piya	Javed Bashir	Qamar Nashad	Naveed Nashad
2026	"Rang De"	Har Pal	Javed Bashir	Qamar Nashad	Naveed Nashad

=== Lollywood (Pakistani cinema) ===
Javed Bashir has recently made his debut in the movie Moor. He has also sung a song in the movie Manto.

Year	Song	Film	Composer
2015	"Talabgar"	Moor	Strings
2015	"Jogiya"	Moor	Strings
2015	"Kaun Hai Yeh Gustakh"	Manto	Jamal Rahman
2016	"Chali Re"	Hijrat	Sahir Ali Bagga
2022	Dard	Gabrana Nahi Hai	Shuja Haider

=== Pollywood (Indian Punjabi cinema) ===
Bashir made his debut in the Punjabi movie Mitti Na Pharol Jogiya. He has sung the title song of this movie.

Year	Song	Film	Composer
2015	"Heer (Mitti Na Pharol Jogiya)"	Mitti Na Pharol Jogiya	Kannu Jimmy
2015	"Vichhad Na Javin"	Ramta Jogi	Harry Anand
2015	"Mere Sayian"	Shareek	Jaidev Kumar
2017	"Zindagi Bana Laya"	Dushman	Jaidev Kumar

=== Bollywood ===
Javed Bashir made his entry in Bollywood through A. R. Rahman's scored movie Yuva, in which his presence was heard in background score where he sang Alaps and Sargams. He debuted in Bollywood as playback singer with Kahaani's "Piya Tu Kaahe Rootha Re" composed by Vishal–Shekhar. Next came "Tera Naam Japdi Phiran" from Cocktail. Pritam composed the music for that film. He also sang "O Re Khuda" for him for another film that year, Rush. The year 2013 began with the solo track "Murabba" from Bombay Talkies. His latest songs include "Mera Yaar" and "O Rangrez" from the movie Bhaag Milkha Bhaag, composed by Shankar–Ehsaan–Loy, and "Ye Tune Kya Kiya" from Once Upon Ay Time in Mumbai Dobaara!, with music by Pritam.

Year	Song	Film	Composer	Featured artists
2012	"Piya Tu Kaahe Rootha Re"	Kahaani	Vishal–Shekhar	
2012	"Tera Naam Japdi Phiran"	Cocktail	Pritam	
2012	"O Re Khuda"	Rush	Pritam	
2013	"Murabba"	Bombay Talkies	Amit Trivedi	
2013	"O Rangrez"	Bhaag Milkha Bhaag	Shankar–Ehsaan–Loy	
2013	"Mera Yaar"	Bhaag Milkha Bhaag	Shankar–Ehsaan–Loy	
2013	"Ye Tune Kya Kiya"	Once Upon Ay Time in Mumbai Dobaara!	Pritam	
2014	"Jigariyaa"	Jigariyaa	Agnel – Faizan	
2015	"Daak Ticket"	Hawaizaada	Rochak Kohli	
2015	"Tujhse Door'	Love Exchange	Jaidev Kumar	
2015	"Aaj Ibadat"	Bajirao Mastani	Sanjay Leela Bhansali	
2016	"Jugni"	Jugni	Clinton Cerejo	
2016	"Dilan De Saudey"	Jugni	Clinton Cerejo	
2016	"Mann Ka Mirga"	Bollywood Diaries	Vipin Patwa	
2016	"Tu Hi Bata Mere Khuda"	Wah Taj	Vipin Patwa	
2017	"Seene Mein Lagi Aag"	Mirza Juuliet	Krishna Solo	
2018	"Tain Ton Uttay"	Daas Dev	Vipin Patwa	
2018	Album	Yeh Kaisa Tigdam	Ismail Darbar & Javed Bashir	
2018	"Chalakta Jaam"	Yeh Kaisa Tigdam	Ismail Darbar & Javed Bashir	
2018	"Andhere Mien Rehne Do"	Yeh Kaisa Tigdam	Ismail Darbar & Javed Bashir	Anvisha
2018	"Jogi Bana Dega"	Yeh Kaisa Tigdam	Ismail Darbar & Javed Bashir	
2018	"Dil Baag Baghicha"	Yeh Kaisa Tigdam	Ismail Darbar & Javed Bashir	

== Awards and nominations ==
Javed Bashir's first Bollywood nomination was in Mirchi Music Awards in the category of Upcoming Male Vocalist of the Year in 2012 for his song "Tera Naam Japdi Phiran" from the film Cocktail followed by his nomination in Global Indian Music Awards in the category of Best Duet for the film Bhaag Milkha Bhaag.

Year	Award	Category	Song	Film/Album	Lyricist	Music	Result
2010	Lux Style Awards	Best Singer of the Year	"Chal Bulleya"	Saptak	Bulle Shah / Bhagat Kabir	Mekaal Hasan Band	Won
2012	Mirchi Music Awards	Upcoming Male Vocalist of the Year	"Tera Naam Japdi Phiran"	Cocktail	Irshad Kamil	Pritam	Nominated
2014	Global Indian Music Awards	Best Debut	"O Rangrez"	Bhaag Milkha Bhaag	Prasoon Joshi	Shankar–Ehsaan–Loy	Nominated
2014	Zee Cine Awards	Best Playback Singer	"Mera Yaar"	Bhaag Milkha Bhaag	Prasoon Joshi	Shankar–Ehsaan–Loy	Nominated
2014	Mirchi Music Awards	Vocalist (Male) Of The Year	"O Rangrez"	Bhaag Milkha Bhaag	Prasoon Joshi	Shankar–Ehsaan–Loy	Nominated
2014	Mirchi Music Awards	Raag Based Song	"O Rangrez"	Bhaag Milkha Bhaag	Prasoon Joshi	Shankar–Ehsaan–Loy	Nominated
2014	Mirchi Music Awards	Song Representing Sufi Tradition	"O Rangrez"	Bhaag Milkha Bhaag	Prasoon Joshi	Shankar–Ehsaan–Loy	Nominated
2014	Mirchi Music Awards	Song Representing Sufi Tradition	"Mera Yaar"	Bhaag Milkha Bhaag	Prasoon Joshi	Shankar–Ehsaan–Loy	Won
2016	Mirchi Music Awards	Raag Based Song	"Aaj Ibadat"	Bajirao Mastani	A.M Turaz	Sanjay Leela Bhansali	Nominated
2016	Lux Style Awards	Best Singer (Male)	"Talabgaar"	Moor	Anwar Maqsood	Strings	Nominated
2016	Lux Style Awards	Song of the Year	"Jogiya"	Moor	Anwar Maqsood	Strings	Nominated
2024	Sitara-i-Imtiaz (Star of Excellence) Award	Best Singer (Sitara-i-Imtiaz)	National Award (Pakistan)				Won
