= Pinjar (novel) =

1950 Punjabi-language novel by Amrita Pritam

- Author: Amrita Pritam
- Original title: ਪਿੰਜਰ
- Translator: Khushwant Singh (in English); Denis Matringe (in French)
- Language: Punjabi
- Genre: Social
- Publisher: Tara Press (reprint)
- Publication date: 2009 (reprint)
- Publication place: India
- Media type: Print
- ISBN: 978-81-83860-97-0

Pinjar (Punjabi: ਪਿੰਜਰ; English/Translation: The Skeleton) is a 1950 Punjabi-language novel written by notable Indian poet and novelist Amrita Pritam. In 2009, Pinjar was translated into English by Khushwant Singh. The novel depicts the conditions and nature of the Indian society during the partition of India in 1947. Amrita Pritam has poured her own experiences in the novel. It is the story of a Hindu woman, Puro, abducted by a Muslim man, Rashid; Puro's parents refuse to accept the "defiled" woman when she manages to escape from Rashid. Pinjar is widely considered one of the outstanding works of Indian fiction set during the Partition of India.

== Main characters ==
- Puro (age: approx. 15)(later, Hamida): main protagonist
- Rashid (age: approx. 22-24): Muslim man who kidnapped Puro
- Ramchand: Puro's fiancé
- Lajjo: sister of Ramchand & wife of Trilok
- Trilok: Puro's brother
- Rajjo: younger sister of Puro
- Tara (Puro's Mother)
- Mohanlal (Puro's Father)
- Shyamlal (Ramchand's Father)
- Pagali
- Javed: Puro's son with Rashid

== Adaptation ==
The novel was adapted in the 2003 Hindi film of the same title (Pinjar), starring Urmila Matondkar, Manoj Bajpai and Sanjay Suri in the lead roles. After receiving critical acclaim, the film went on to win the National Film Award for Best Feature Film on National Integration. A Pakistani television series based on the novel titled Ghughi premiered on 25 January 2018 on TVOne Pakistan.
