= Chal Bulleya =

Single by Mekaal Hasan Band

from the album Saptak
- Released: 20 September 2009
- Length: 4:31 (single); 4:52 (video)
- Songwriters: Kabir; Bulleh Shah

"Chal Bulleya" is a single by the Pakistani band Mekaal Hasan Band from their album Saptak. Javed Bashir was on the vocals. The lyrics were taken from the verses written by Bulleh Shah and Kabir.

== Video ==
The video was shot and directed by Bilal Lashari. It featured Moammar Rana, Meera, Rabia Butt, Juggun Kazim, Aaminah Haq, and Ahmed Ali Butt.

The video portrayed the seven deadly sins. It is based in a hotel, with seven different characters, alone in seven different rooms, indulging in their own sin. They are all interlinked by a hotel maid who walks in and out of their rooms. She eventually weaves these characters together by being the last sin (envy) to this seven-headed dragon of a video.

== Accolades ==
In the 9th Lux Style Awards, Bashir won the Best Singer Award for the song, while Lashari was nominated in the category for Best Music Video Director. In an online poll by DAWN, the video was voted as the best music video of 2010.
