= Mekaal Hasan Band =

Pakistani sufi rock band

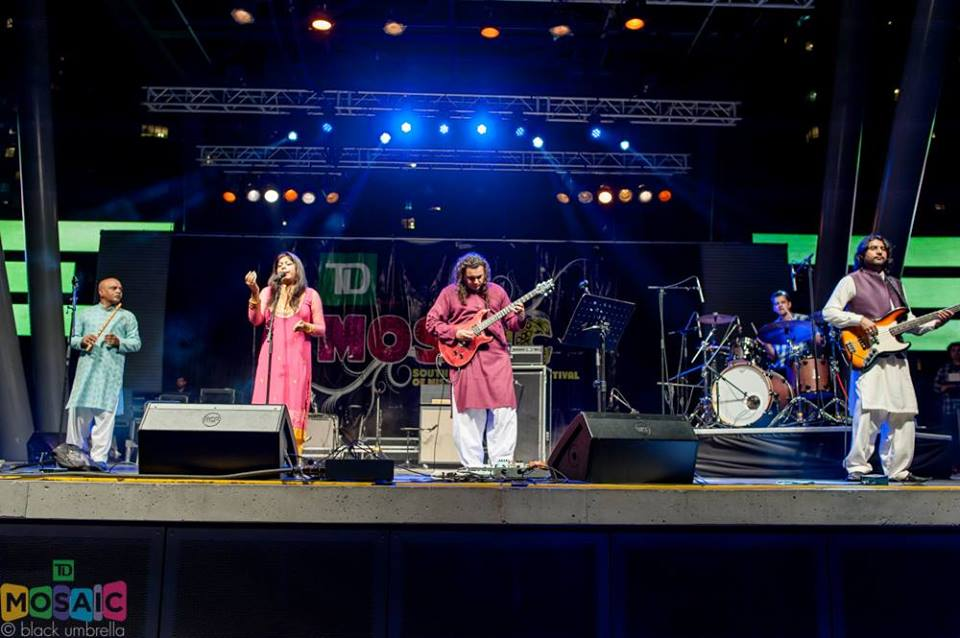
- Mekaal Hasan Band - Live in Canada at Celebration Square, Mississauga

Background information
- Origin: Lahore, Punjab, Pakistan
- Genres: Alternative rock, Sufi rock, Jazz
- Years active: 2000 – present
- Labels: Sadaf Stereo, ARY Musik The Musik Records, EMI/Virgin Records, Times Music
- Members: Mekaal Hasan; Mohammad Ahsan Papu; Sharmistha Chatterjee; Sheldon D'Silva; Gino Banks; Agha Ibrahim Akram; Amir Azhar
- Past members: Asad Abbas; Riaz Ali Khan; Sameer Ahmed; Javed Bashir; Kami Paul
- Website: mekaalhasanband.com

Mekaal Hasan Band (Urdu: میکال حسن بینڈ), sometimes shortened to MHB, is a progressive rock band, founded in 2001 by Pakistani guitarist, composer and producer Mekaal Hasan. The Mekaal Hasan Band is known for being innovators of a progressive style of music which finds its melodic roots in South Asian traditional musical and literary art forms, some of which include Qawali, Sufiana Kalam and traditional material from Indian and Pakistani culture and folkloric traditions. This also led to the formation of a super group called Mekaalians led by Wazir Taqi and Najeeb Ur Rehman from Islamabad.

Founded in Lahore, Pakistan in 2001 by Mekaal Hasan, the band has comprised a revolving cast of Pakistani and international artists, musicians, visual artists and other creators.

The band's music is rooted in the South Asian culture, while managing to communicate to modern audiences in contemporary musical settings. The band members have roots in different genres, including Jazz, Indian/Pakistani traditional classical, 70's progressive rock, old school RnB, 70's funk and soul.

== History ==
=== Early years (1995–2004) ===
Songwriter Mekaal Hasan, born in Lahore, Pakistan, was surrounded by music since childhood. His mother was a Christian and father, Masood Hasan, a Muslim, passionate for jazz music who influenced him throughout his early years. After graduating from Government College, Lahore, Mekaal studied music at the Berklee College of Music, Boston, US, and his stay there exposed him to a wide variety of music and influences from other musicians. He returned to Lahore in 1995 after his parents offered to build him a studio. After some initial struggle, he had a musical breakthrough in Pakistan in 2004.

In March 2001, Mekaal collaborated with Pete Lockett in a series of concerts countrywide featuring music written for Pete and classical artists by Mekaal.

Mekaal Hasan has worked with many other fellow-musicians like Ali Azmat, Atif Aslam, Jal Band, Noori, Zeb and Haniya, Meesha Shafi, Poor Rich Boy, Fareed Ayaz and Abu Mohammad Qawwal and many more musicians.

=== Pepsi Battle of the Bands ===
The band entered the first season of the music television series Pepsi Battle of the Bands, in an effort to win the competition and earn a lucrative album deal from Pepsi. The band finished third, behind Aaroh and Entity Paradigm who finished first and second respectively.

=== Sampooran (2004–2008) ===
Mekaal Hasan Band released their debut album, Sampooran, in 2004 through EMI/Virgin Records.

=== Saptak (2009–2010) ===
Mekaal Hasan Band, released their second album in October 2009. They also released their video of a single "Chal Bulleya" on 2 October 2009.

On 3 February 2010, the band's vocalist Javed Bashir decided to part ways after working along with the band for 8 years. On 26 December, in an online poll by Dawn, the band's video for their single, "Chal Bulleya", was voted as the best music video of 2010.

=== Andholan (2014) ===
Mekaal Hasan Band's latest album featuring the all new lineup was released September 2014 in Pakistan and India across iTunes, Taazi, Amazon Music, and other platforms. Mekaal Hasan Band released just one video from a live performance of the track "Ghunghat". Despite being a live performance, it won song of the year in The Express Tribune's Critics Choice and in the reader polls, and was also declared 2014's song of the year by Dawn. The album was removed from GIMA Awards for having "foreign roots", although the album featured Indian vocalist Sharmistha Chatterjee in all the songs.

== Discography ==
Studio albums

- Sampooran (2004)
- Saptak (2009)
- Andholan (2014)

== Band members ==
Current

- Mekaal Hasan – lead guitar (2001–present)
- Mohammad Ahsan Papu – flute (2001–present)
- Sharmistha Chatterjee – lead vocals (2013–present)
- Sheldon D'Silva – bass (2013–present)
- Gino Banks – Drummer (2013–present)

Former

- Riaz Ali Khan – lead vocals (2001–2002)
- Sameer Ahmed – bass guitar (2001–2009)
- Asad Abbas – lead vocals (2010–2011)
- Javed Bashir – lead vocals (2002–2010,2011–2013)
- Amir Azhar – bass (2009–2013)
- Kami Paul – Drummer (2012–2013)

== See also ==
- List of Pakistani music bands
