= Pinjar (2003 film) =

2003 Indian film by Chandraprakash Dwivedi

- Directed by: Chandraprakash Dwivedi
- Written by: Chandraprakash Dwivedi
- Story by: Amrita Pritam
- Based on: Pinjar by Amrita Pritam
- Produced by: Vishnu Manchu
- Starring: Urmila Matondkar; Manoj Bajpayee; Sanjay Suri; Kulbhushan Kharbanda; Isha Koppikar; Farida Jalal; Sandali Sinha; Priyanshu Chatterjee
- Cinematography: Santosh Thundiyil
- Edited by: Ballu Saluja
- Music by: Uttam Singh
- Production company: Lucky Star Entertainment
- Distributed by: 20th Century Fox India
- Release date: 24 October 2003
- Running time: 188 minutes
- Country: India
- Languages: Hindi; Punjabi

Pinjar (transl. The Skeleton) is a 2003 Indian Hindi-language historical drama film written and directed by Chandraprakash Dwivedi. The film revolves around the Hindu-Muslim problems during the partition of India and is based on a Punjabi novel of the same name, written by Amrita Pritam. It stars Urmila Matondkar, Manoj Bajpayee, Sanjay Suri, Sandali Sinha, and Priyanshu Chatterjee. Upon release, the film received critical acclaim, winning the National Film Award for Best Feature Film on National Integration and the Special Jury Award for Bajpayee.

== Plot ==
Set during the 1947 Partition of India, Puro is a young Hindu woman who lives a happy, comfortable life with her family. She is engaged to a kind young man, Ramchand, who is from an upstanding family. While on an outing with her younger sister Rajjo, Puro is suddenly kidnapped by a mysterious man, Rashid. Rashid's family has an ancestral dispute with Puro's family. In the past, Puro's family had made Rashid's family homeless by taking over their property. Puro's uncle had even kidnapped Rashid's aunt and then released her after raping her. The task of exacting revenge is given to Rashid, and his family tells him to kidnap Puro, to settle the score.

Rashid goes through with the kidnapping but cannot bring himself to rape Puro, since he is drawn to her. One night, Puro manages to escape and return to her parents. Her parents woefully turn away their daughter, explaining that if Puro were to stay, their family name will be tarnished because she spent days in a man's house and her younger sisters will never be able to get married. Even when Puro cries desperately that she is untouched, her family does not open their door to her and heartbreakingly tell her to never come back there. Left with no support, Puro returns to Rashid who is well-aware of Puro's escape; he knew she wouldn't be let in by her parents and had been waiting for her nearby.

After a few months, Puro's family marries their son Trilok to Ramchand's younger sister, Lajjo, while Rajjo is married to Ramchand's cousin. Meanwhile, Rashid marries Puro, and they settle into an uneasy routine of husband and wife, during which time Puro becomes pregnant but miscarries their child.

The British colonialists leave India and the Subcontinent reels under the effects of the partition. Ramchand's uncle, cousin and Rajjo leave for India and are safe while Ramchand, his parents and Lajjo are caught in the communal riots. Ramchand hurriedly leaves for India with his younger sister and mother; his father is already missing. Shortly after, Lajjo is kidnapped by rioters. Puro meets Ramchand, who woefully tells her of Lajjo's plight. Puro finds Lajjo and helps her escape with Rashid's assistance. This incident brings Puro and Rashid closer, and Puro sees Rashid's loyalty towards her and his care for her family. They bring Lajjo to Lahore where Trilok and Ramchand come to receive her.

Trilok has a tearful reunion with Puro and explains to her that if she so chooses, she can start a new life, as Ramchand is ready to accept her even now. Puro surprises Trilok by refusing and saying that after everything that has happened, she is where she belongs. Ramchand responds with tremendous empathy to Puro, as he sees that she has accepted Rashid. Meanwhile, Rashid slowly tries to merge into the crowd, making it easier for Puro to leave with her family. He is heartbroken, as he is deeply in love with her, but wants her to be happy. However, Puro seeks Rashid out and the two tearfully bid Ramchand, Trilok, and Lajjo farewell forever.

== Cast ==
- Urmila Matondkar as Puro/Hamida
- Manoj Bajpayee as Rashid
- Sanjay Suri as Ramchand
- Sandali Sinha as Laajo
- Priyanshu Chatterjee as Trilok
- Isha Koppikar as Rajjo
- Lilette Dubey as Tara, Puro's mother
- Kulbhushan Kharbanda as Mohanlal, Puro's father
- Alok Nath as Shyamlal, Ramchand's father
- Farida Jalal as Ramchand's mother
- Seema Biswas as Pagli, Mad Woman
- Dina Pathak as Rashid's aunt
- Sudha Shivpuri as Rashid's mother
- Pradeep Kuckreja as Hukamchand
- Salima Raza as Hukamchand's wife
- Ghulam Arif as Managing director
- Rohitash Gaud as Rashid's brother
- Shefali Rana as Pagli's friend
- Saurabh Bavaliya as Laajo's cousin
- Niharika as Kamla
- Savita Bajaj as Daai, a midwife
- Parveena Bano as Rahim's wife

== Soundtrack ==
Pinjar

Soundtrack album by Uttam Singh
- Released: 31 August 2003
- Genre: Feature film soundtrack
- Length: 50:57
- Languages: Hindi, Punjabi
- Label: Saregama

All of the tracks were composed by Uttam Singh, with lyrics by Gulzar. The tracks "Charkha Chalati Maa" and "Waris Shah Nu" have lyrics by Amrita Pritam.

Tracklist
No.	Title	Lyrics	Singer(s)	Length
1.	"Shaba Ni Shaba"	Gulzar	Udit Narayan, Kavita Krishnamurthy & Sadhana Sargam	05:40
2.	"Maar Udari"	Gulzar	Jaspinder Narula, Preeti Uttam, Amey Date & Nihar S.	05:26
3.	"Haath Choote" (Duet)	Gulzar	Jagjit Singh & Preeti Uttam	06:52
4.	"Vatna Ve"	Gulzar	Uttam Singh & Roop Kumar Rathod	05:30
5.	"Darda Marya"	Gulzar	Wadali Brothers & Jaspinder Narula	06:31
6.	"Charkha Chalati Maa"	Amrita Pritam	Preeti Uttam	04:56
7.	"Sita Ko Dekhe"	Zehra Nigah	Suresh Wadkar & Sadhana Sargam	03:10
8.	"Shabad"	Traditional	Preeti Uttam	03:36
9.	"Waris Shah Nu"	Amrita Pritam	Wadali Brothers & Preeti Uttam	09:03
10.	"Haath Choote"	Gulzar	Jagjit Singh	06:52
Total length:				50:57

== Reception ==
Amberish K Diwanji of Rediff praised the acting performances of Urmila Matondkar, Priyanshu Chatterjee, Manoj Bajpai and the art direction of Muneesh Sappel but criticized the climax of the film. The critic gave the film a rating of 4 out of 5 saying that, "Pinjar is a must-see. Don't miss it." Derek Elley of Variety reviewed the film saying that, "A handsomely shot drama centered on a Hindu woman's travails during the 1947 Partition, "Pinjar" ranks as one of the better Bollywood treatments of this still hot-button issue. Good performances, especially by lead actress Urmila Matondkar and by Manoj Bajpai as her Muslim partner, compensate for a slightly wobbly structure". Kshama Rao of Glamsham said that, "The music (Uttam Singh), the painstaking research (Muneesh Sappel) that has gone into the costumes and set designs is remarkable. Last but not the least, Dr Dwivedi almost had a winner on hand if he had not taken too long to build up the drama." Anupama Chopra of India Today said that, "While Matondkar struggles to rise above her natural artifice Manoj Bajpai is superb as the angst-ridden Muslim abductor. But the sweat and hard work is stunted by the screenplay. Finally, what could have been a great film remains only a commendable effort."

Taran Adarsh of Bollywood Hungama praised the performances of Urmila Matondkar and Manoj Bajpai but criticized the long length of the movie and its slow pace specially towards the climax. The critic gave the film a rating of 3 out of 5 saying that, "On the whole, PINJAR caters more to the thinking audience. Also, it’s for those who like period fares." Kunal Shah of Sify gave the film a rating of 2 out of 5 saying that, "Overall, the film is brilliantly executed and handled with utmost sensitivity but its length is one factor, which might affect its prospects in the long run." Chitra Mahesh of The Hindu praised the acting performances but criticized the pacing of the film which she found slow and in conclusion said that, "one cannot help admiring the way he(The Director) has put together a team that has brought out such a visually, beautiful film."

== Awards ==
- 2004: Filmfare Best Art Direction Award - Munish Sappal
- 2004: National Film Award - Special Jury Award - Manoj Bajpayee

== See also ==
- List of Asian historical drama films
