= Kagaj te Canvas =

Collection of poems by Amrita Pritam

Kagaj te Canvas is a book collection of poems by Amrita Pritam for which she got Jnanpith Award, India's Highest Literary Award in 1981.
