= Imroz (painter) =

Indian artist and poet (1926–2023)

- Born: Inderjeet Singh; 26 January 1926; Lyallpur, Punjab Province, British India
- Died: 22 December 2023 (aged 97); Mumbai, Maharashtra, India
- Occupations: Artist (painter, illustrator, poet, and editor)
- Partner: Amrita Pritam
- Writing career
- Period: 1960s–2000s
- Notable works: Jashan Jaari Hai; Manchaaha Hi Rishta; Rang Tere Mere

Inderjeet Singh (26 January 1926 – 22 December 2023), also known as Imroz, was an Indian visual artist and poet. He was the partner of the poet, novelist, and writer Amrita Pritam, and they lived together until Pritam's death in 2005. He ran a monthly literary magazine Nagmani along with Pritam for 37 years.

== Biography ==
Inderjeet Singh was born in 1926 at Chowk number 36 in Lyallpur of undivided Punjab.

In 1966, Singh started illustrating editions of Amrita Pritam's Nagmani magazine. It was at this time that he changed his name to Imroz.

He spent his final years in Mumbai, maintaining a close relationship with Pritam's children and grandchildren.

== Personal life ==
Imroz met Amrita Pritam while she was working for All India Radio in Delhi as a presenter for the Punjabi service, after which a romantic relationship between the two developed. Pritam was married at the time but she shortly divorced her husband in 1961. Imroz and Pritam were long-term partners; they lived together in Hauz Khas from 1964 until Pritam's death in October 2005.

Over the course of their relationship, both wrote many poems dedicated to the other and Pritam was the subject of many of Imroz's paintings. Pritam's final literary work entitled "Main tainu pher milangi" (I Will Meet You Again) was dedicated to Imroz. She wrote and admired how Imroz loved her in the same way as she loved Sahir Ludhianvi. With a strong belief that she will be back, in a nazm for Imroz in 2004, she wrote, “Main tainu pher milangi, Kithe… kis tarah… pata nahi… par tainu zaroor milangi…(I will meet you again… Where.. How?… I know not.. but I will meet you again).”

After Pritam started getting sick, Imroz started composing poems, and he continued to do so even after she died. Several of his poems were dedicated to her. He wrote poems for Pritam in all four of his poetry volumes. These include "Jashan Jaari Hai", "Manchaaha Hi Rishta", and "Rang Tere Mere", for which he received recognition. "Kabhi kabhi khoobsurat khyaal, khoobsurat badan bhi akhtiyaar kar lete hain," Imroz wrote in a nazm titled "Amrita", beautiful bodies can sometimes be shaped by beautiful thoughts.

The book Amrita Imroz: A Love Story written by Uma Trilok recounts their love story.

== See also ==
- Amrita Pritam
- Sahir Ludhianvi
