= Anglo-Indian Canadians =

Canadians of Anglo-Indian ancestry

Total population
- 3,340 (2021)

Regions with significant populations
- Throughout Canada, Winnipeg

Languages
- Canadian English, French, British English, Punjabi, see Languages of India

Religion
- Anglicanism, Presbyterianism, Baptism, Methodism and Roman Catholicism

Related ethnic groups
- English Canadians, Indo-Canadians, Tamil Canadians, Pakistani Canadians, Indian diaspora

Anglo-Indian Canadians are Canadian citizens of Anglo-Indian heritage. Many Anglo-Indian Canadians have roots in the Indian subcontinent. Some of the earlier generations of Indians have British Indian heritage.

== History ==
Indians from the subcontinent have migrated overseas to many countries such as South Africa, Great Britain, Oceania, Caribbean, North America, and South East Asia due to political conflicts, economic opportunities, education and search of a better life. Indian migration to Canada recently is due to economic opportunities as well as education.

== Notable Anglo-Indian Canadians ==
- Crystal Ferrier, comedian
- Joseph Harris (born 1965), Indian-born Canadian cricketer
- Boris Karloff (born 1887, died 1969), British-Canadian actor
- George Marthins (1905 – 1989), Indian field hockey player, 1928 Olympian, emigrated to Canada
- Russell Peters (born 1970), Canadian comedian
- Sydney Greve (1925-2015) prominent Indian-born two-time Olympian representing Pakistan, he later emigrated to Canada alongside his family.
