= Culture of South Asia =

A depiction of South Asia (mostly orange) and its influence on neighbouring parts of Asia (lighter-orange).

The culture of South Asia, also known as Indospheric culture, is a mixture of several cultures in and around the Indian subcontinent. Ancient South Asian culture was primarily based in Hinduism, which itself formed as a mixture of Vedic religion and indigenous traditions (like Dravidian folk religion), and later Buddhist influences. From the medieval era onwards, influences from the Muslim world (particularly Central Asia and the Middle East) and then Europe (primarily British) also became prevalent.

South Asian culture has influenced other parts of Asia, particularly Southeast Asia (see Greater India).

== Overview ==
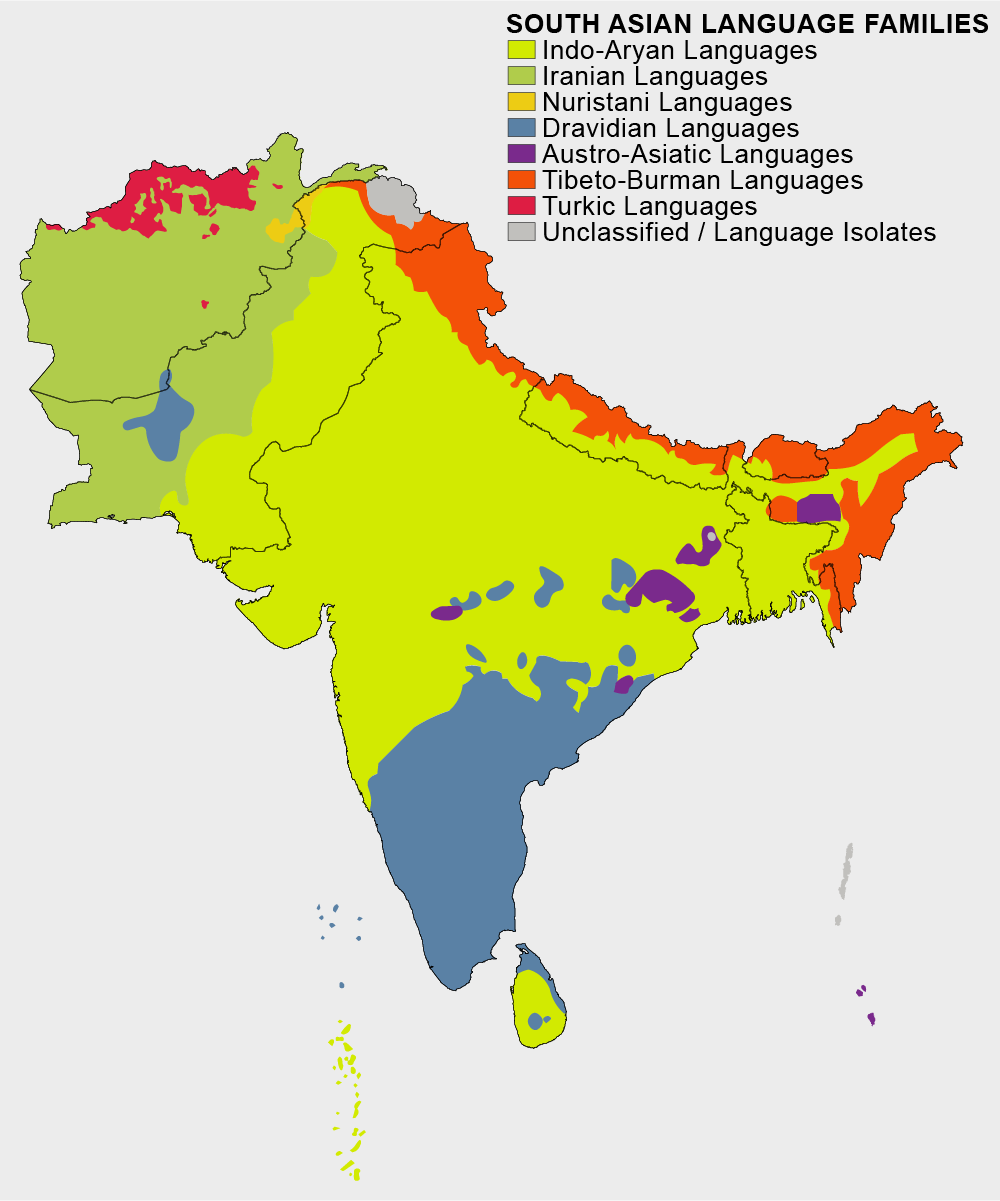
Language families in South Asia

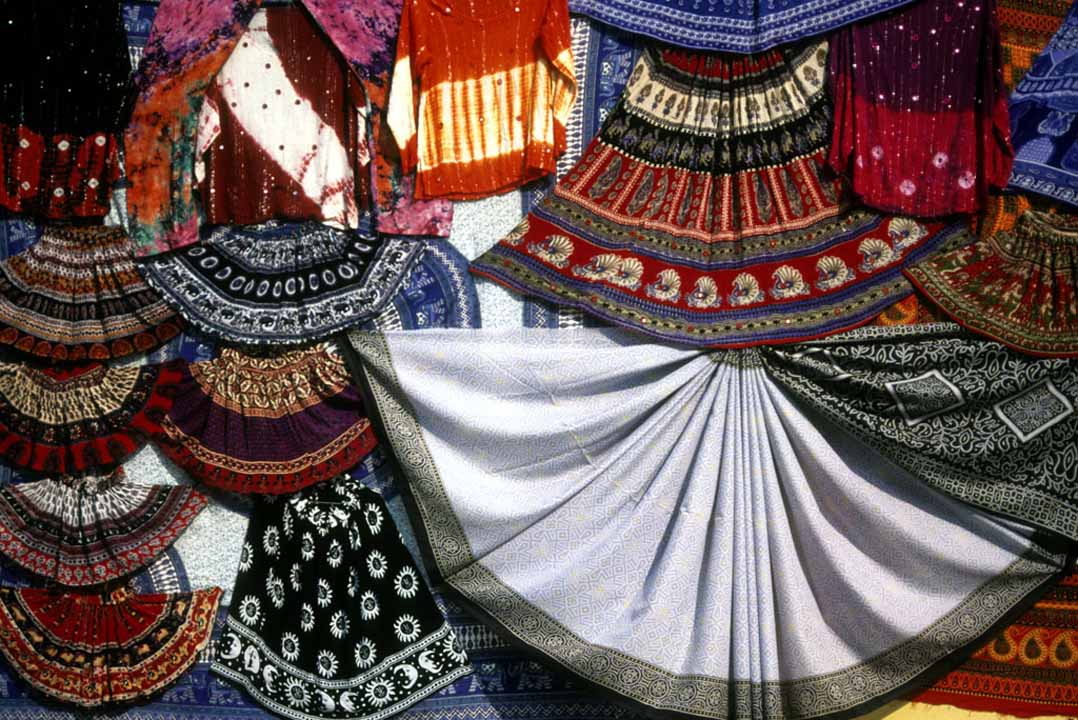
Traditional Rajasthani garments from Jaipur, Rajasthan

Evidence of Neolithic culture has been found throughout the modern states Afghanistan, Bangladesh, Bhutan, Maldives, Nepal, India, Pakistan and Sri Lanka that represent South Asia (also known as the Indian subcontinent). Since 3,300 B.C. in modern-day northeastern Afghanistan, in Pakistan and northwestern India a sophisticated Bronze Age cultural tradition emerged, that after only a few centuries fully flourished in urban centers. Due to the high quality of its arts, crafts, metallurgy and buildings, the accomplishments in urban planning, governance, trade and technology etc. it has been classified as one of the principal Cradles of civilization. Referred to as the Indus Valley civilisation or Harappan Civilisation it thrived for almost 2.000 years until the onset of the Vedic period (c. 1500 – c. 600 B.C.). The great significance of the Vedic texts (that don't mention cities or urban life) for South Asian culture, their impact on family, societal organisation, religion, morale, literature etc. has never been contested. The Indus Valley Civilisation on the other hand has only come to light by means of 20th century archaeology. Scholars, who employ several periodization models argue over whether South Asian tradition is consciously committed to the Harappan culture.

Declining climatic conditions, (aridification) and population displacement (Indo-Aryan migration) are regarded as to have caused the fatal disruption of the Harappa culture, that was superseded by the rural Vedic culture.

Following the Indo-Aryan settlement in the Indo-Gangetic Plain and the establishment of the characteristic social groups (Brahmanas, Kshatriyas, Vaishyas and Shudras) in the caste system based on the Jāti model in the Varna order, the tribal entities variously consolidated into oligarchic chiefdoms or kingdoms (the 16 Mahajanapadas), beginning in the sixth century B.C. The late Vedic political progress results in urbanization, strict social hierarchy, commercial and military rivalries among the settlers, that have spread all over the entire sub-continent. The large body of Vedic texts and literature, supported by the archaeological sequence allows researchers to reconstruct a rather accurate and detailed image of the Vedic culture and political organisation. The Vedas constitute the oldest work of Sanskrit literature and form the basis of religious, ethic and philosophic ideas in South Asia. They are widely, but not exclusively regarded the basics and scriptural authority on worship, rituals, ceremonies, sacrifices, meditation, philosophy and spiritual knowledge for the future Hindu and Buddhist cosmology. Commentaries and discussions also focus on the development of valid political ideas and concepts of societal progress and ethic conformity.

Hinduism, Buddhism, Jainism and Sikhism are major religions of South Asia. After a long and complex history of cosmological and religious development, adoption and decline, the Hindu-synthesis and the late but thorough introduction of Islam about 80% of modern-day Indians and Nepalis identify as Hindus. In Sri Lanka and Bhutan most people adhere to various forms of Buddhism. Islam is the predominant religion in Afghanistan, the Maldives (99%), Pakistan (96%) and Bangladesh (90%).

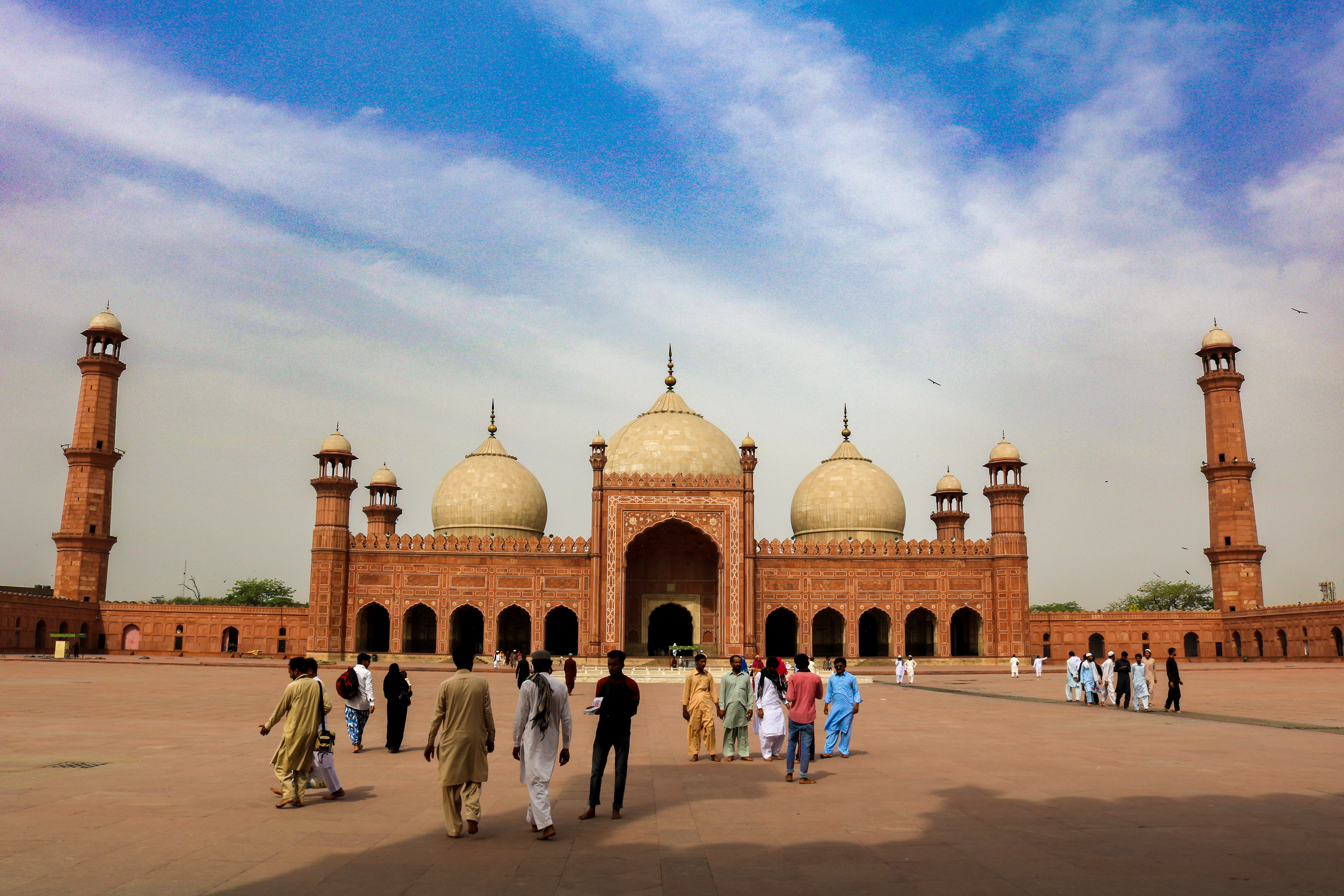
Badshahi Mosque built under the Mughal emperor Aurangzeb in Lahore, Pakistan

Afghanistan and Pakistan are situated at the western periphery of South Asia, where the cultural character has been made by both the Indosphere and Persia. Pakistan is split with its two western regions of Baluchistan and Khyber Pakhtunkhwa sharing a greater Iranic heritage due to the native Pashtuns and Baloch people of the regions. Its two eastern regions of Punjab and Sindh share cultural links to Northwest India. Bangladesh and the Indian state of West Bengal share a common heritage and culture based on the Bengali language. The culture of India is diverse and a complex mixture of many influences. Nepal is culturally linked to both India and Tibet and the varied ethnic groups of the country share many of the festivals and cultural traditions used and celebrated in North and East India and Tibet. Nepali, the dominant language of Nepal uses the Devanagari alphabet which is also used to write many North Indian languages. Bhutan is a culturally linked to Tibet and India. Tibetan Buddhism is the dominant religion in Bhutan and the Tibetan alphabet is used to write Dzongkha, the dominant language of Bhutan. There is a cultural and linguistic divide between North and South India. Sri Lanka is culturally tied to both India and Southeast Asia. Sinhala, the dominant language in the country is written in Sinhala script which is derived from the Kadamba-Pallava alphabet, certain cultural traditions, and aspects of its cuisine, for example, show South Indian influences. Cultural festivals, aspects of its cuisine and Theravada Buddhism, the dominant religion in Sri Lanka, show a Southeast Asian affinity.

Indo-Aryan languages are spoken in Pakistan, Bangladesh, the Maldives, Sinhala of Sri Lanka and most of North, West and East India and Nepal. Dravidian languages namely Telugu, Tamil, Kannada and Malayalam languages are spoken across South India and in Sri Lanka by the Tamil community while Brahui is spoken in Balochistan, Pakistan. Tibeto-Burman languages are spoken in Nepal, Bhutan, North Pakistan and North & North East India. Iranic Languages are spoken in Baluchistan and Khyber Pakhtunkhwa in Pakistan. The main languages of Afghanistan are Pashto and Dari.

== History ==
=== Medieval era ===
The Delhi Sultanate, having conquered most of India by the 13th century, ushered in over five centuries of Indo-Muslim rule, and helped turn Delhi into a cosmopolitan and powerful hub in the Islamic world.

The Mughal Empire played a role in consolidating the political structure that defines South Asia until the present-day, having brought various South Asian subregions' focuses to bear on each other, rather than on neighbouring Afro-Eurasian regions.

=== Colonial era ===
The introduction of census-based demography and local elections in the 19th century created harder boundaries between various communities in newly political ways. European Christian history, which featured a substantial streak of conflict with Islam, also influenced local perceptions of Indo-Muslim history to become more negative.

The British colonisation of India influenced South Asian culture noticeably. The most noticeable influence is the English language which emerged as the administrative and lingua franca of India and Pakistan (and which also greatly influenced the native South Asian languages; see also: South Asian English) followed by the blend of native and gothic/sarcenic architecture. Similarly, the influence of the South Asian languages and culture can be seen on Britain, too; for example, many Indian words entering the English language, and also the adoption of South Asian cuisine.

=== Contemporary era ===
The 1947 partition of India resulted in cultural divergence among the newly created countries of India and Pakistan. Cultural and linguistic disputes also characterised the 1971 secession of Bangladesh (then East Pakistan) from Pakistan.

Competing forms of nationalism, be they civic, religious, ethnocultural or otherwise, have increasingly shaped cultural debates in various South Asian countries.

== Religion ==
In 2010, South Asia had the world's largest population of Hindus, about 510 million Muslims, over 27 million Sikhs, 35 million Christians and over 25 million Buddhists. Hindus make up about 68 percent or about 900 million and Muslims at 31 percent or 510 million of the overall South Asia population, while Buddhists, Jains, Zoroastrians, Sikhs, and Christians constitute most of the rest. The Hindus, Buddhists, Jains, Sikhs, Zoroastrians, and Christians are concentrated in India, Nepal, Sri Lanka and Bhutan, while the Muslims are concentrated in Afghanistan (99%), Bangladesh (91%), Pakistan (96%) and Maldives (100%).

Indian religions (also known as Dharmic religions) are the religions that originated in the Indian subcontinent; namely Hinduism, Jainism, Buddhism and Sikhism. The Indian religions are distinct yet share terminology, concepts, goals and ideas, and from South Asia spread into East Asia and Southeast Asia. Early Christianity and Islam were introduced into coastal regions of South Asia by merchants who settled among the local populations. Later Sindh, Balochistan, and parts of the Punjab region saw conquest by the Arab caliphates along with an influx of Muslims from Persia and Central Asia, which resulted in spread of both Shia and Sunni Islam in parts of northwestern region of South Asia. Subsequently, under the influence of Muslim rulers of the Islamic sultanates and the Mughal Empire, Islam spread in South Asia. About one-third of the world's Muslims are from South Asia.

== Languages ==
South Asia is home to several hundred languages, spanning the countries of Afghanistan, Bangladesh, Bhutan, India, the Maldives, Nepal, Pakistan, and Sri Lanka. It is home to the third most spoken language in the world, Hindi–Urdu; the seventh most spoken language, Bengali; and thirteenth most spoken language, Punjabi. (Note: combining both western and eastern Punjabi) Languages like Bengali, Tamil and Nepali have official/national status in more than one country of this region. The languages in the region mostly comprise Indo-Iranic and Dravidian languages, and further members of other language families like Austroasiatic, and Tibeto-Burman languages.

== Art ==
The earliest Indian art originated during the prehistoric settlements of the 3rd millennium BCE, such as the rock shelters of Bhimbetka, which contain some of the world's oldest known cave paintings. On its way to modern times, Indian art has had cultural influences, as well as religious influences such as Hinduism, Buddhism, Jainism, Sikhism and Islam. In spite of this complex mixture of religious traditions, generally, the prevailing artistic style at any time and place has been shared by the major religious groups.

== Cinema ==
Cinema is prominent in South Asia, with the Bollywood (representing the most-spoken language in the region of Hindi) and South Indian film industries being the most dominant. Pakistan's Lollywood also is growing, while historically, Bengali cinema was highly acclaimed by international film circles.

== Cuisine ==
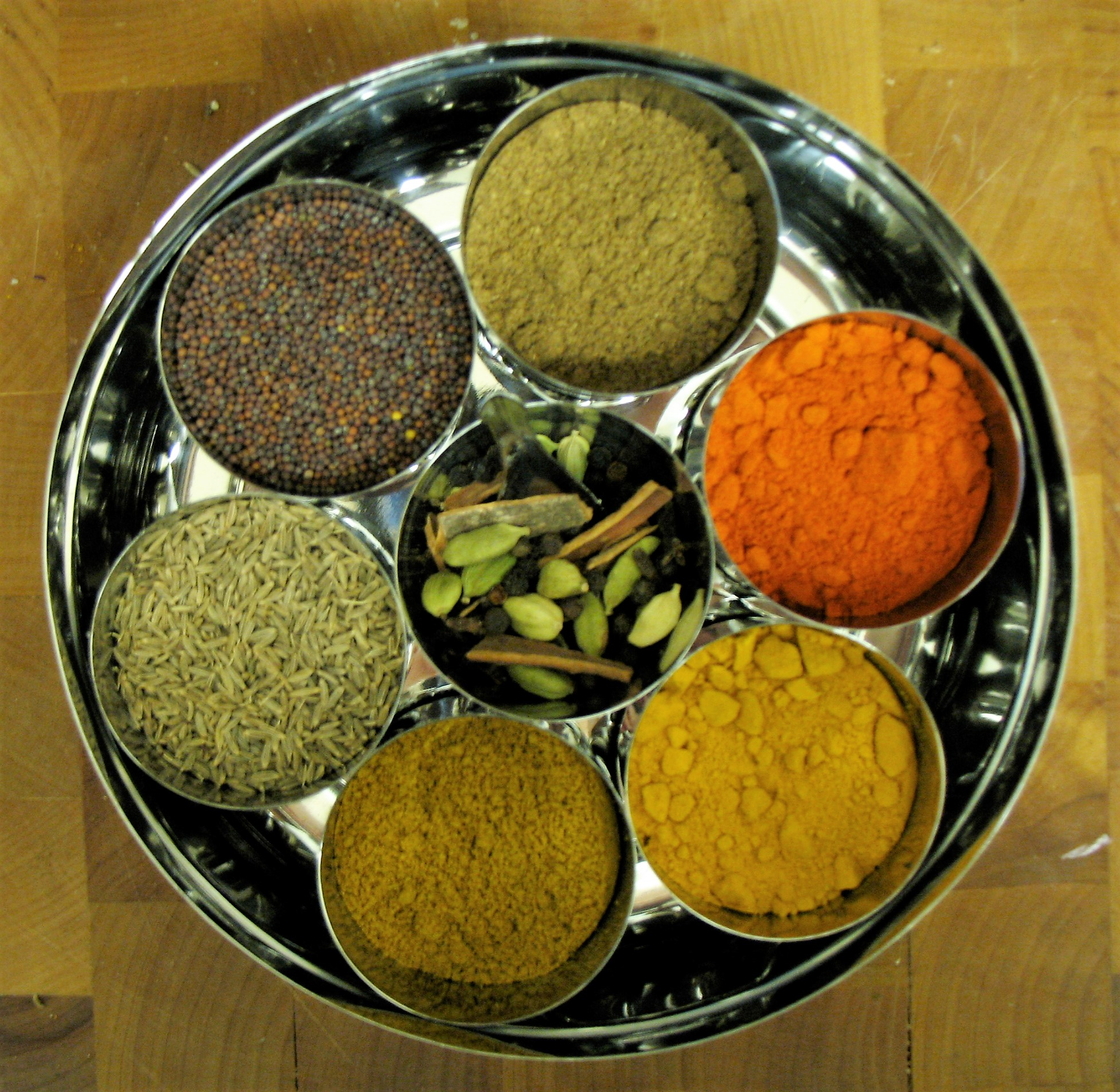
An assortment of spices and herbs. Spices are an indispensable food ingredient in much of the Indian subcontinent.

Chapati, a type of flat bread, is a common part of meals to be had in many parts of the Indian subcontinent. Other staples from many of the cuisines include rice, roti made from atta flour, and beans.

Foods in this area of the world are flavoured with various types of chilli, black pepper, cloves, and other strong herbs and spices, along with the flavoured butter ghee. Ginger is an ingredient that can be used in both savory and sweet recipes in cuisines from the subcontinent. Chopped ginger is fried with meat, and pickled ginger is often an accompaniment to boiled rice. Ginger juice and ginger boiled in syrup are used to make desserts. Turmeric and cumin are often used to make curries.

Common meats include goat, fish, chicken and beef. Beef is less common in India than in other South Asian cuisines because cattle have a special place in Hinduism. Prohibitions against beef extend to the meat of (water) buffalo and yaks to some extent. Lamb is common in certain regions but not always prominent. Pork is considered a taboo food item by all Muslims. However it is avoided by Hindus despite not being taboo, though it is commonly eaten in some regions like Northeast India and Goa. A variety of very sweet desserts which use dairy products is also found in the cuisines of the Indian subcontinent. The main ingredients in desserts of the Indian subcontinent are reduced milk, ground almonds, lentil flour, ghee and sugar. Kheer, a dairy-based rice pudding, is a common dessert.

== Sports ==
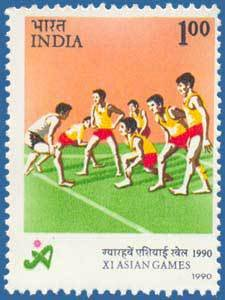
Kabaddi, a native South Asian sport, made its inaugural appearance at the Asian Games in 1990.

Many sports are played in South Asia, with cricket being the most popular of them; 90% of the sport's worldwide fans live in South Asia. Football is followed passionately in some parts of South Asia, such as Kerala and Bengal. Field hockey was popular for several decades, with some of South Asia's greatest sporting accomplishments having taken place in this sport. Some native South Asian games are played professionally in the region, such as kabaddi and kho-kho, and also feature in regional competitions such as the South Asian Games and Asian Games.

=== Ancient era ===
Some traditional South Asian games, such as kabaddi, kho-kho, and atya-patya, are believed to be thousands of years old, finding mention in historical scriptures and dating back to ancient India. Kho-kho, for example, dates back to at least the fourth century BC. Many South Asian games likely reflect characteristics of traditional life in the subcontinent; for example, the Bengali hopscotch game of ekka-dokka (related to Stapoo and Chindro) may reflect the concepts of land division and ownership of property in ancient times.

=== Modern era ===
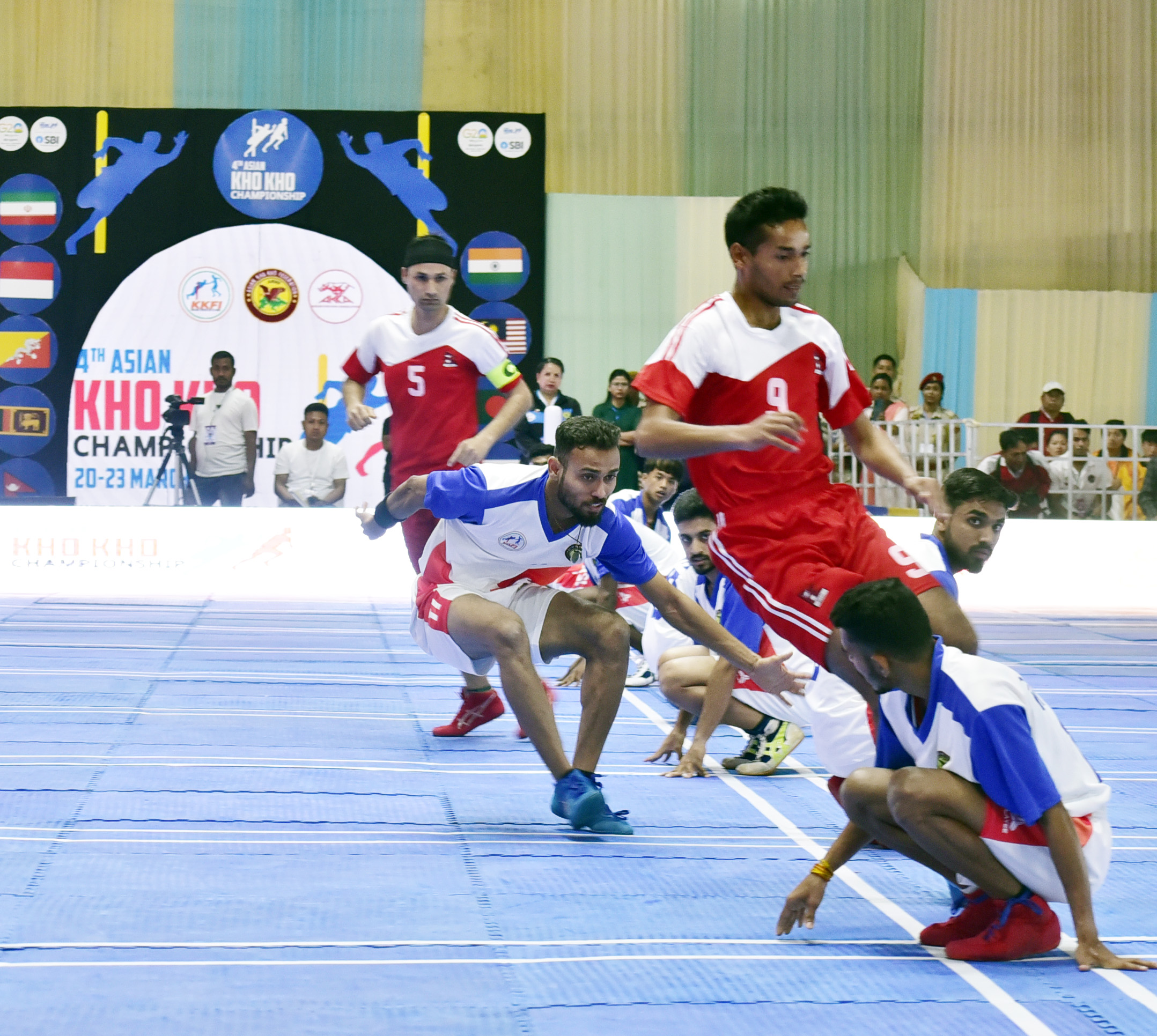
India vs Iran at the 2023 Asian Kho Kho Championship. Kho kho is South Asia's second-most popular tag game.

After the British colonisation of the subcontinent which peaked from the 19th century to 1947, Western sports such as cricket, football, and hockey began to be followed to a greater extent, to the detriment of the traditional games. The modern advent of urbanisation, globalisation (which attracted people towards more globally popular games), and technology (which gave people digital forms of entertainment such as the Internet, television, and video games) have further diminished the traditional South Asian sports. Additional reasons include religious extremism in some areas, which has restricted people from playing certain games, and lack of governmental support.

However, the affordability of the traditional games saw them prioritised for physical education purposes by some thinkers of the early postcolonial period, and some professional leagues are now being started for traditional sports, such as the Pro Kabaddi League, Ultimate Kho Kho, and Pro Panja League, which are beginning to revive interest in these sports and even globalise them. These leagues are now some of the most-watched competitions in India.

== Martial arts ==
Indian martial arts refers to the fighting systems of the Indian subcontinent. A variety of terms are used for the English phrases "Indian martial arts", deriving from ancient sources. While they may seem to imply specific disciplines (e.g. archery, armed combat), by Classical times they were used generically for all fighting systems.

Among the most common terms today, śastra-vidyā, is a compound of the words śastra (weapon) and vidyā (knowledge). Dhanurveda derives from the words for bow (dhanushya) and knowledge (veda), the "science of archery" in Puranic literature, later applied to martial arts in general. The Vishnu Purana text describes dhanurveda as one of the traditional eighteen branches of "applied knowledge" or upaveda, along with shastrashāstra or military science. A later term, yuddha kalā, comes from the words yuddha meaning fight or combat and kalā meaning art or skill. The related term śastra kalā (lit. weapon art) usually refers specifically to armed disciplines. Another term, yuddha-vidyā or "combat knowledge", refers to the skills used on the battlefield, encompassing not only actual fighting but also battle formations and strategy. Martial arts are usually learnt and practiced in the traditional akharas.

== Music ==
South Asian music comprises a range of prominent musical genres and styles that are unique to the countries in and around the Indian subcontinent. This subregion of Asia includes countries such as India, Afghanistan, Bangladesh, Bhutan, Maldives, Nepal, Pakistan, and Sri Lanka, with each region one possessing its own distinct musical traditions. South Asian styles of music reflect a diverse range of local customs, regional languages and historical traditions, that have shaped the musical practices which are still seen today. Throughout history, South Asian musicians have emulated religious and spiritual beliefs into their compositions, resulting in the creation of musical styles such as Qawwali, Ghazal and Hindustani classical music. The development of forms of mass media in the 1980s and 1990s contributed to a new type of South Asian musical culture, as the rise of cinema and television resulted in the popularity of genres such as Bollywood and Lollywood. As a result of social media and modern streaming networks, folk and ritual music styles are still widely appreciated today, with many modern artists taking inspiration from the classical traditions that defined the history of South Asian music.

== Architecture ==
=== Pakistani architecture ===
Pakistani architecture is intertwined with the architecture of the broader Indian subcontinent. The major architectural styles popular in the past were Temple, Indo-Islamic, Mughal and Indo-Saracenic architecture, all of which have many regional varieties. In the mid-3rd millennium BC, the land that is now Pakistan witnessed the rise of the Indus Civilization—South Asia's first great urban culture—marked by advanced city planning and enduring architectural marvels, some of which survive to this day. This was followed by the Gandhara style of Buddhist architecture that borrowed elements from Ancient Greece. These remnants are visible in the Gandhara capital of Taxila.

=== Indian architecture ===
Indian architecture is rooted in the history, culture, and religion of India. Among multiple architectural styles and traditions, the best-known include the many built in accordance to Indian religion and philosophy with Hindu, Jain, Buddhist, and Sikh styles of architecture being the most prevalent in India, with Indo-Islamic architecture, Rajput architecture, Mughal architecture, South Indian architecture, and Indo-Saracenic architecture having a strong presence as well.

Early Indian architecture was made from wood, which did not survive due to rotting and instability in the structures. Instead, the earliest surviving examples of Indian architecture are Indian rock-cut architecture, including many Buddhist, Hindu, and Jain temples.

Hindu temple architecture is traditionally divided into two main architectural styles: the Dravidian style of southern India and Nagara style of northern India, with several regional variations that combine elements of both. Other regional styles, such as the Vesara style of the Deccan plateau and the Kalinga style of eastern India, developed through local tastes. In addition to temple architecture, domestic housing styles in India also vary widely between regions, reflecting differences in climate, geography, building materials, and cultural traditions.

The first major Islamic empire in India was the Delhi Sultanate, which led to the development of Indo-Islamic architecture, combining Indian and Islamic architectural features. The rule of the Mughal Empire, when Mughal architecture evolved, is regarded as the zenith of Indo-Islamic architecture, with the Taj Mahal being the high point of their contribution. Indo-Islamic architecture influenced Rajput and Sikh architecture as well.

During the British colonial period, European styles including Neoclassical, Gothic Revival, and Baroque became prevalent across India. The amalgamation of Indo-Islamic and European styles led to a new style, known as the Indo-Saracenic style. Following the events succeeding India's independence from Britain, new European modernist ideas spread amongst Indian architects as a means of progressing as a new republic. Swiss-French architect Le Corbusier was commissioned by the Indian government to design the city of Chandigarh, which influenced a generation of architects towards modernism in the 20th century. The continued economic reforms further bolstered modern architecture and the urban layout of India, as the country became more integrated with the world's economy.

=== Dravidian architecture ===
Dravidian architecture, or the Southern Indian temple style, is an architectural style in Hindu temple architecture that emerged from Southern India, reaching its final form by the sixteenth century.

In contrast with North Indian temple styles, Dravidian architecture uses shorter and more pyramidal towers, called vimana, over the garbhagriha or sanctuary, where the north has taller towers, usually curving inwards as they rise, called shikharas. Larger modern Dravidian style temples, however, include one or more high gopura or gatehouse entrances to the compound as their dominating feature; large temples have several dwarfing the vimana, although these are a much more recent development. There are numerous other distinct features, such as the dvarapalakas – twin guardians at the main entrance and the inner sanctum of the temple, and goshtams – deities carved in niches on the outer side walls of the garbhagriha.

Mentioned as one of three styles of temple building in early texts on vastu shastra or Hindu temple architecture, the majority of existing structures are in the Southern Indian states of Andhra Pradesh, Karnataka, Kerala, Tamil Nadu, Telangana, some parts of Maharashtra, Odisha and Sri Lanka. Various kingdoms and empires such as the Satavahanas, the Vakatakas of Vidarbha, the Cholas, the Cheras, the Kakatiyas, the Reddis, the Pandyas, the Pallavas, the Gangas, the Kadambas, the Rashtrakutas, the Chalukyas, the Hoysalas and Vijayanagara Empire among others have made substantial contribution to the evolution of Dravidian architecture.

=== Bengali architecture ===
The architecture of Bengal, which comprises the modern country of Bangladesh and the Indian states of West Bengal and Assam's Karimganj district, has a long and rich history, blending indigenous elements from the Indian subcontinent, with influences from different parts of the world. Bengali architecture includes ancient urban architecture, religious architecture, rural vernacular architecture, colonial townhouses and country houses and modern urban styles. The bungalow style is a notable architectural export of Bengal. The corner towers of Bengali religious buildings were replicated in medieval Southeast Asia. Bengali curved roofs, suitable for the very heavy rains, were adopted into a distinct local style of Indo-Islamic architecture, and used decoratively elsewhere in north India in Mughal architecture.

Bengal is not rich in good stone for building, and traditional Bengali architecture mostly uses brick and wood, often reflecting the styles of the wood, bamboo and thatch styles of local vernacular architecture for houses. Decorative carved or moulded plaques of terracotta (the same material as the brick) are a special feature. The brick is extremely durable and disused ancient buildings were often used as a convenient source of materials by local people, often being stripped to their foundations over the centuries

== Clothing ==
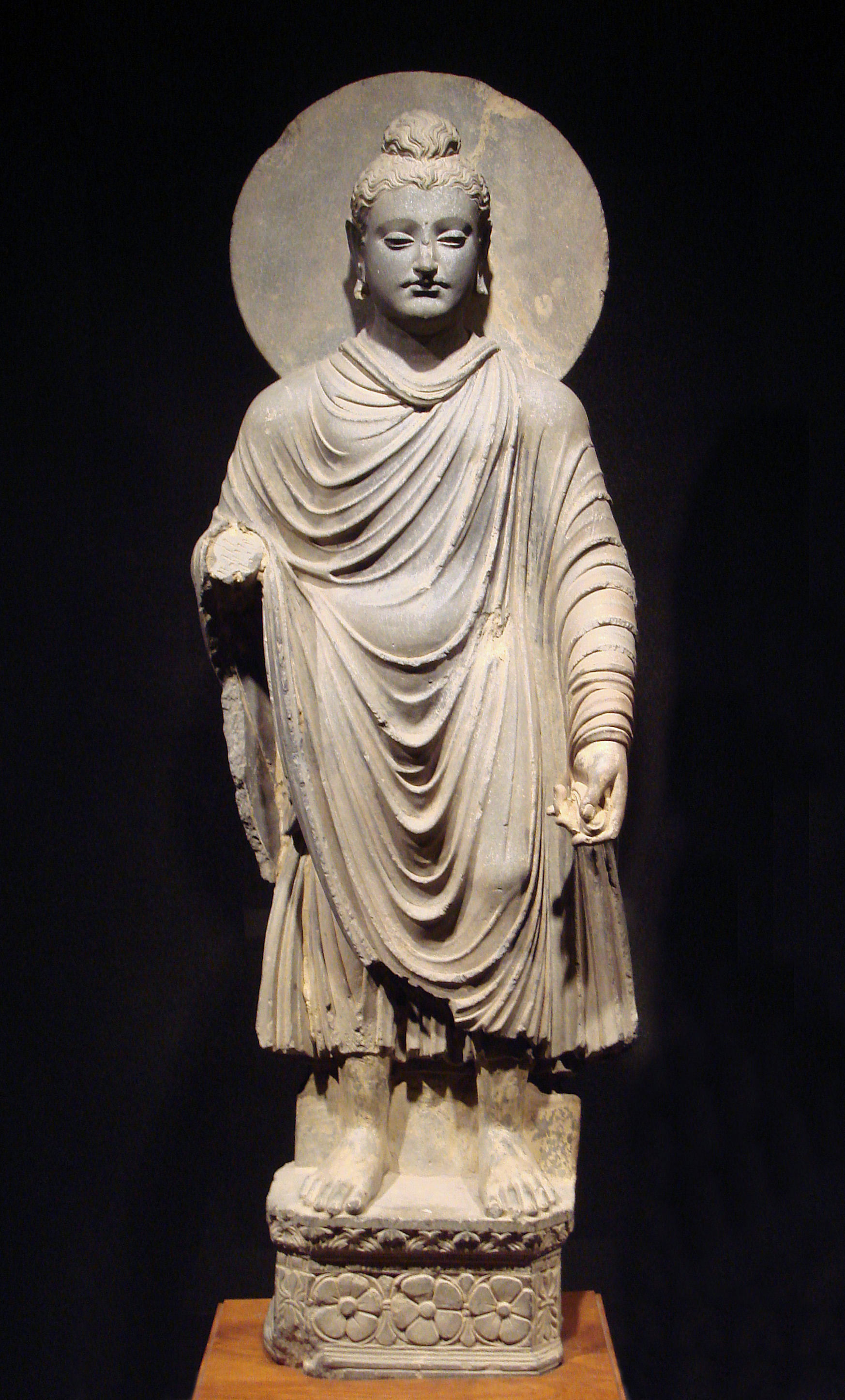
The Buddha wearing kāṣāya robes, Gandhara, 1st-2nd century CE. Height about 1 metre. Tokyo National Museum

History of clothing in the Indian subcontinent can be traced to the Indus Valley Civilisation (3300 BCE-1300 BCE) or earlier. Indians have mainly worn clothing made up of locally grown cotton. India was one of the first places where cotton was cultivated and used even as early as 2500 BCE during the Harappan era. The remnants of the ancient Indian clothing can be found in the figurines discovered from the sites near the Indus Valley civilisation, the rock-cut sculptures, the cave paintings, and human art forms found in temples and monuments. These scriptures view the figures of human wearing clothes which can be wrapped around the body. Taking the instances of the sari, the bandana, to that of the turban and the dhoti; the traditional Indian wears were mostly tied around the body in various ways.

== Literature ==
South Asian literature refers to the literature that is composed by authors in the Indian subcontinent and its diaspora. It has an extensive history with some of the earliest known pieces of literature. South Asia has many different languages that have been spoken due to its size and how long people have been inhabiting it. This has caused the region to be the most linguistically diverse region in the planet, and as well as having four language families (Dravidian, Indo-European, Austro-Asiatic and Tibeto-Burman), hundreds of languages and thousands of dialects. Many modern pieces of South Asian literature are written in English for a global audience. Many of the ancient texts of the subcontinent have been lost due to the inability to preserve verbally transmitted literature. South Asia has many significant authors that shaped the postcolonial period and response to the British establishment in the subcontinent. Modern South Asian literature has a deep focus on independence from Britain, mainly expressed in prose, this literature commonly discusses the partition of India and how different South Asian nations, religions, and cultures interact with each other. Countries to which South Asian literature's writers are linked include India, Pakistan, Bangladesh, Sri Lanka and Nepal. Works from Bhutan, Myanmar, Tibet, and the Maldives are sometimes also included.

== Philosophy ==
Indian philosophy consists of philosophical traditions of the Indian subcontinent. These philosophical traditions are often called darśana, meaning "to see" or "looking at." Ānvīkṣikī means “critical inquiry” or “investigation." Unlike darśana, ānvīkṣikī was used to refer to Indian philosophies by classical Indian philosophers, such as Chanakya in the Arthaśāstra.

A traditional Vedic classification divides āstika and nāstika schools of philosophy, depending on one of three alternate criteria: whether it believes the Vedas as a valid source of knowledge; whether the school believes in the premises of Brahman and Atman; and whether the school believes in afterlife and Devas. (though there are exceptions to the latter two: Mimamsa and Samkhya respectively).

There are six major (āstika) schools of Vedic philosophy—Nyaya, Vaisheshika, Samkhya, Yoga, Mīmāṃsā and Vedanta—and five major non-Vedic or heterodox (nāstika or sramanic) schools—Jain, Buddhist, Ajivika, Ajñana, and Charvaka. The āstika group embraces the Vedas as an essential source of its foundations, while the nāstika group does not. However, there are other methods of classification; Vidyaranya for instance identifies sixteen schools of Indian philosophy by including those that belong to the Śaiva and Raseśvara traditions.

The main schools of Indian philosophy were formalised and recognised chiefly between 500 BCE and the late centuries of the Common Era. Some schools like Jainism, Buddhism, Yoga, Śaiva and Vedanta survived, but others, like Ajñana, Charvaka and Ājīvika did not.

Ancient and medieval era texts of Indian philosophies include extensive discussions on ontology (metaphysics, Brahman-Atman, Sunyata-Anatta), reliable means of knowledge (epistemology, Pramanas), value system (axiology) and other topics.

== See also ==
- Culture of Asia
- Category:Culture of South Asia
- Individual South Asian countries' cultures:
  - Culture of Afghanistan
  - Culture of Bangladesh
  - Culture of Bhutan
  - Culture of India
  - Culture of the Maldives
  - Culture of Nepal
  - Culture of Pakistan
  - Culture of Sri Lanka

== Referenced works ==
- Kenoyer, Jonathan Mark (1991), "The Indus Valley tradition of Pakistan and Western India", Journal of World Prehistory, 5 (4): 1–64, doi:10.1007/BF00978474, S2CID 41175522
- Coningham, Robin; Young, Ruth (2015), Archaeology of South Asia: From the Indus to Asoka, c.6500 BCE–200 CE, Cambridge University Press
- Singh, Upinder (2008), A History of Ancient and Early Mediaeval India: From the Stone Age to the 12th Century, Pearson Education India, ISBN 978-81-317-1120-0
- Bowker, John, ed. (1999). The Oxford Dictionary of World Religions. Oxford University Press. ISBN 978-0-19-866242-6.
- Doniger, Wendy (2014). On Hinduism. Oxford University Press. ISBN 978-0-19-936008-6. Archived from the original on 30 January 2017.
- Nicholson, Andrew J. (2010). Unifying Hinduism: Philosophy and Identity in Indian Intellectual History. Columbia University Press. ISBN 978-0-231-14987-7.
- Acharya, Mādhava (1894). The Sarva-darśana-samgraha: Or, Review of the Different Systems of Hindu Philosophy. Translated by Cowell, E. B.; Gough, A. E. London: Trübner & Company.
- Perrett, Roy W. (1984). "The Problem of Induction in Indian Philosophy". Philosophy East and West. 34 (2): 161–174. doi:10.2307/1398916. JSTOR 1398916.
- Perrett, Roy W., ed. (2000). Indian Philosophy : A Collection of Readings, Volume 3: Metaphysics. Garland. ISBN 978-0-8153-3608-2.
- Acharya, Mādhava (1894). The Sarva-darśana-samgraha: Or, Review of the Different Systems of Hindu Philosophy. Translated by Cowell, E. B.; Gough, A. E. London: Trübner & Company.
- Cowell, E. B.; Gough, A. E. (2001). The Sarva-Darsana-Samgraha or Review of the Different Systems of Hindu Philosophy. Trubner's Oriental Series. Taylor & Francis. ISBN 978-0-415-24517-3.
