= Nagmani (magazine) =

Nagmani (Urdu: ناگ منی) was a Punjabi literary magazine started by writer and Sahitya Akademi Award winner, Amrita Pritam. The magazine is believed to have inspired and established many Punjabi writers such as Gurdial Singh, Dalip Kaur Tiwana and Shiv Kumar Batalvi.

== History ==
Nagmani was started in 1966 and it is believed that it was Sati Kumar's idea, a Punjabi writer and friend of Amrita Pritam. It was designed by Imroz.

The last issue was released in 2001–2002 as Amrita's health started deteriorating.
