= Adliwala =

Village in Punjab, India

Adliwala ਆਦੀਵਾਲਾ
- Village

Punjabi transcription(s)
  - Latin: Ādīvālā
  - Shahmukhi: آدی والا
- Interactive map of Adliwala
- Coordinates: 31.7286°N 74.8299°E
- Country: India
- State: Punjab
- Division: Jalandhar
- District: Amritsar
- Tehsil: Ajnala

Area
  - Total: 708 ha (1,750 acres)

Population (2011)
  - Total: 3,949
  - Density: 558/km^{2} (1,440/sq mi)

Sex
  - Male: 2,122
  - Female: 1,827
  - Sex ratio: 860.98
- Time zone: UTC+05:30 (IST)
- PIN: 143101

Adliwala village is located in Ajnala tehsil in the Amritsar district of Punjab, 16 km away from the district headquarters of Amritsar. As of 2011, the total population of the village was 3,949 (2,122 men and 1,827 women) living in 849 households.
