= Sampooran =

Studio album by Mekaal Hasan Band
- Released: January 8, 2004 (re-released on October 12, 2007 in India)
- Recorded: 2002–2003 at Digital Fidelity Studio in Lahore, Pakistan
- Genres: Alternative rock Jazz fusion Sufi rock
- Length: 51:58
- Labels: EMI, Sadaf Stereo
- Producer: Mekaal Hasan

Mekaal Hasan Band chronology
Sampooran (2004)	Saptak (2009)

Singles from Sampooran
- 1. "Rabba" Released: December 19, 2003; 2. "Sajan" Released: May 23, 2004

Sampooran (Urdu: سمپورن, literal English translation: "complete/perfect") is the debut album of the Pakistani rock band Mekaal Hasan Band, released on January 8, 2004. Singles from the album included "Rabba", released in 2003 and "Sajan", released in 2004.

== Track listing ==
All music composed by Mekaal Hasan Band.

Sampooran
No.	Title	Writer(s)	Length
1.	"Sajan"	Shah Hussain	7:07
2.	"Waris Shah"	Amrita Pritam	7:26
3.	"Rabba"	Shah Hussain	6:55
4.	"Sanwal"	Farhat Abbas Shah	6:31
5.	"Sampooran"		8:13
6.	"Darbari"		5:16
7.	"Ya Ali"		7:22
8.	"Late Moon"	Mekaal Hasan	5:37

== Personnel ==
All information is taken from the CD.

Mekaal Hasan Band

- Mekaal Hasan – lead guitar
- Javed Bashir – lead vocals
- Mohammad Ahsan Papu – flute
- Sameer Ahmed – bass guitar

Additional musicians

- Keyboards: Farhan Albert
- Drums: John "Gumby" Louis Pinto
- Drums & Percussion: Pete Lockett
- Guitars and Bass: Michael Mondesir

Production

- Produced by Mekaal Hasan
- Recorded & Mixed at Digital Fidelity Studio, Lahore, Punjab
- Guitar sound engineer: Mekaal Hasan
- Assisted by Mekaal Hasan
