= Pete Lockett =

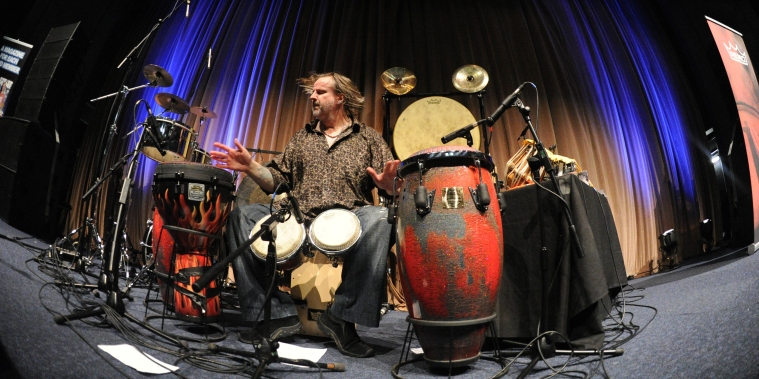

Background information
- Born: Peter Lockett; Portsmouth, United Kingdom
- Occupations: Musician, composer
- Instruments: Drums, percussion
- Years active: 1983–present
- Website: petelockett.com

Pete Lockett is an English percussionist and recording artist. He retired from performance and commercial recording in 2022. Lockett is known as a versatile and prolific percussionist, collaborating with many artists. He is well-versed in percussion traditions from music cultures around the world, from traditional Carnatic and Hindustani music of North and South India to traditional Japanese taiko drumming, with a style ranging from blues, funk and rock to classical, folk and ethnic and from Arabic to Electronic. His instruments include tabla, mridangam, kanjira, ghatam, vocal percussion, dholak, naal, bhangra dhol from north and south India; darabuka, req, bendir, frame-drums from the Middle East; congas, bongos, timbales and berimbau from Latin American; as well as the Irish bodhran, Nigerian udu, West African djembe, Japanese taiko, Western drum set, and many custom percussion effects and self-built instruments. He also works extensively with electronics and samplers, both live and in the studio, to create densely alternative percussion fabrics.

== Youth ==
Lockett grew up in Portsmouth, Hampshire, to a non-musical family. He began studying at the age of 19 when he passed a drum shop one day and took a lesson. Lockett found music to be exhilarating, eventually moving to London two years later to pursue a career in the field. He stumbled upon Indian music in the (nineteen) eighties at a Festival of India concert featuring Ali Akbar Khan and Zakir Hussain and became curious about the musical legacies of the country." He then studied with “Yousuf Ali Khan" and “Karaikudi Krishnamurthy.”

== Career ==
He has recorded and/or performed with many artists including, Björk, Afro Celt Sound System, Peter Gabriel, Robert Plant, The Verve, Amy Winehouse, Pet Shop Boys, Sinéad O'Connor, Nitin Sawhney, Zakir Hussain, Steve Smith, U Shrinivas, Amit Chatterjee, Jeff Beck, Royal Philharmonic Orchestra, Mekaal Hasan, Craig Armstrong, Roxy Music’s Phil Manzarena and A.R. Rahman amongst many others. He has also worked extensively in the film industry, playing on a number of Bond movies including Quantum of Solace, Die Another Day, The World is Not Enough, Tomorrow Never Dies and Casino Royale. Among other films Lockett has worked on are Moulin Rouge!, The Insider, City of Angels, The Bone Collector and the Guy Ritchie movie Snatch. He was voted the best percussionist in the world by Rhythm magazine. His first educational book, Indian Rhythms For The Drumset was released on Hudson music. Lockett retired from performance and commercial recording in 2022.
