= Amrita Pritam =

Indian writer (1919–2005)

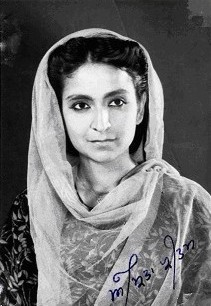
- Pritam c. 1948
- Born: Amrit Kaur; 31 August 1919; Gujranwala, Punjab Province, British India (now Punjab, Pakistan)
- Died: 31 October 2005 (aged 86); Delhi, India
- Occupations: Novelist, poet, essayist
- Spouse: Pritam Singh
- Partner(s): Sahir Ludhianvi; Imroz
- Children: 2
- Writing career
- Period: 1936–2005
- Genres: Poetry, prose, autobiography
- Subjects: Partition of India, women, dreams
- Notable works: Pinjar (novel); Ajj aakhaan Waris Shah nu (poem); Suneray (poem)
- Notable awards: Sahitya Akademi Award (1956); Padma Shri (1969); Bharatiya Jnanpith (1981); Shatabdi Samman (2000); Padma Vibhushan (2004)
- Movement: Romantic-Progressivism

Member of Parliament, Rajya Sabha
- In office 12 May 1986 – 11 May 1992
- Nominated by: Giani Zail Singh
- Constituency: Nominated

Amrita Pritam ([əm.mɾɪt̪ɑː pɾiːt̪əm]; 31 August 1919 – 31 October 2005) was an Indian novelist, essayist and poet, who wrote in Punjabi and Hindi. A prominent figure in Punjabi literature, she is the recipient of the 1956 Sahitya Akademi Award. Her body of work comprised over 100 books of poetry, fiction, biographies, essays, a collection of Punjabi folk songs and an autobiography that were all translated into several Indian and foreign languages.

Pritam is best remembered for her poignant poem, Ajj aakhaan Waris Shah nu (Today I invoke Waris Shah – "Ode to Waris Shah"), an elegy to the 18th-century Punjabi poet, and an expression of her anguish over massacres during the partition of British India. As a novelist, her most noted work was Pinjar ("The Skeleton", 1950), in which she created her memorable character, Puro, an epitome of violence against women, loss of humanity and ultimate surrender to existential fate; the novel was made into an award-winning film, Pinjar (2003).

When British India was partitioned into the independent states of India and Pakistan in 1947, she migrated from Lahore to India, though she remained equally popular in Pakistan throughout her life.

Pritam's magnum opus, the long poem Sunehade, won her the 1956 Sahitya Akademi Award, making her the first and the only woman to have been given the award for a work in Punjabi. She received the Jnanpith Award, one of India's highest literary awards, in 1982 for Kagaz Te Canvas ("The Paper and the Canvas"). She was awarded the Padma Shri in 1969, and the Padma Vibhushan, India's second highest civilian award, in 2004. In that same year she was honoured with India's highest literary award given by the Sahitya Akademi (India's Academy of Letters), the Sahitya Akademi Fellowship, awarded to the "immortals of literature" for lifetime achievement.

== Biography ==
=== Background ===
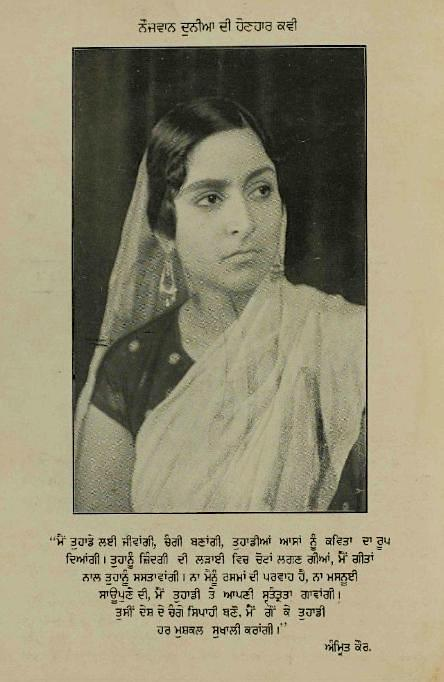
Amrit Kaur alias Amrita Pritam in Preetlari in May 1936

Amrita Pritam was born as Amrit Kaur in 1919 in Gujranwala, Punjab, in British India into a Sikh family. She was the only child of Raj Bibi, a school teacher, and Kartar Singh Hitkari, a poet and a scholar of the Braj Bhasha language, and the editor of a literary journal. Besides this, he was a pracharak – a preacher of the Sikh faith. Amrita's mother died when she was eleven. Soon after, she and her father moved to Lahore, where she lived till her migration to India in 1947. Confronting adult responsibilities and besieged by loneliness following her mother's death, she began to write at an early age. Her first anthology of poems, Amrit Lehran ("Immortal Waves") was published in 1936, at age sixteen, the year she married Pritam Singh, an editor to whom she was engaged in early childhood and changed her name from Amrit Kaur to Amrita Pritam. Half a dozen collections of poems followed between 1936 and 1943.

Though she began her journey as a romantic poet, she soon shifted gears, and became part of the Progressive Writers' Movement. The effect was seen in her collection, Lok Peed ("People's Anguish", 1944), which openly criticised the war-torn economy after the Bengal famine of 1943. She was also involved in social work to a certain extent, and participated in such activities wholeheartedly after Independence, when social activist Guru Radha Kishan took the initiative to bring the first Janta Library in Delhi. This was inaugurated by Balraj Sahni and Aruna Asaf Ali, and she contributed to the occasion. This study centre cum library is still running at Clock Tower, Delhi. She also worked at a radio station in Lahore for a while, before the partition of India.

M. S. Sathyu, the director of the partition movie Garam Hava (1973), paid a theatrical tribute to her through his performance 'Ek Thee Amrita'.

=== Partition of India ===
One million people, Hindus, Sikhs and Muslims died in communal violence that followed the partition of India in 1947, and left Amrita Pritam a Punjabi refugee at age 28, when she left Lahore and moved to New Delhi. Subsequently, in 1947, while she was pregnant with her son, and traveling from Dehradun to Delhi, she expressed anguish on a piece of paper like the poem, "Ajj Aakhaan Waris Shah Nu" (I ask Waris Shah Today); this poem was to later immortalize her and become the most poignant reminder of the horrors of Partition. The poem was addressed to the 18th-century Sufi poet Waris Shah, author of the tragic saga of Heer and Ranjha and with whom she shares her birthplace.

Amrita Pritam worked until 1961 in the Punjabi service of All India Radio, Delhi. After her divorce in 1960, her work became more feminist. Many of her stories and poems drew on the unhappy experience of her marriage. A number of her works have been translated into English, French, Danish, Japanese, Mandarin, and other languages from Punjabi and Urdu, including her autobiographical works Black Rose and Rasidi Ticket (Revenue Stamp).

The first of Amrita Pritam's books to be filmed was Dharti Sagar te Sippiyan, as Kadambari (1975), followed by Unah Di Kahani, as Daaku (Dacoit, 1976), directed by Basu Bhattacharya. Her novel Pinjar (The Skeleton, 1950) narrates the story of partition riots along with the crisis of women who suffered during the times. It was made into an award-winning Hindi movie by Chandra Prakash Dwivedi, because of its humanism: "Amritaji has portrayed the suffering of people of both the countries." Pinjar was shot in a border region of Rajasthan and Punjab.

She edited Nagmani, a monthly literary magazine in Punjabi for several years, which she ran together with Imroz, for 33 years; though after Partition she wrote prolifically in Hindi as well. Later in life, she turned to Osho and wrote introductions for several books of Osho, including Ek Onkar Satnam, and also started writing on spiritual themes and dreams, producing works like Kaal Chetna ("Time Consciousness") and Agyat Ka Nimantran ("Call of the Unknown"). She had also published autobiographies, titled, Kala Gulab ("Black Rose", 1968), Rasidi Ticket ("The Revenue Stamp", 1976), and Aksharon kay Saayee ("Shadows of Words").

=== Awards and honors ===
Amrita was the first recipient of Punjab Rattan Award conferred upon her by Punjab Chief Minister Capt. Amarinder Singh. She was the first female recipient of the Sahitya Akademi Award in 1956 for Sunehadey (poetic diminutive of the Punjabi word "ਸੁਨੇਹੇ" (Sunehe), Messages), Amrita Pritam received the Bhartiya Jnanpith Award, India's highest literary award, in 1982 for Kagaj te Canvas (Paper and Canvas). She received the Padma Shri (1969) and Padma Vibhushan (2004), India's second highest civilian award, and Sahitya Akademi Fellowship, India's highest literary award, also in 2004. She received D.Litt. honorary degrees, from many universities including, Delhi University (1973), Jabalpur University (1973) and Vishwa Bharati (1987).

She also received the international Vaptsarov Award from the Republic of Bulgaria (1979) and Degree of Officer dens, Ordre des Arts et des Lettres (Officier) by the French Government (1987). She was nominated as a member of Rajya Sabha 1986–92. Towards the end of her life, she was awarded by Pakistan's Punjabi Academy, to which she had remarked, Bade dino baad mere maike ko meri yaad aayi.. (My motherland has remembered me after a long time); and also Punjabi poets of Pakistan, sent her a chaddar, from the tombs of Waris Shah, and fellow Sufi mystic poets Bulle Shah and Sultan Bahu.

== Personal life ==
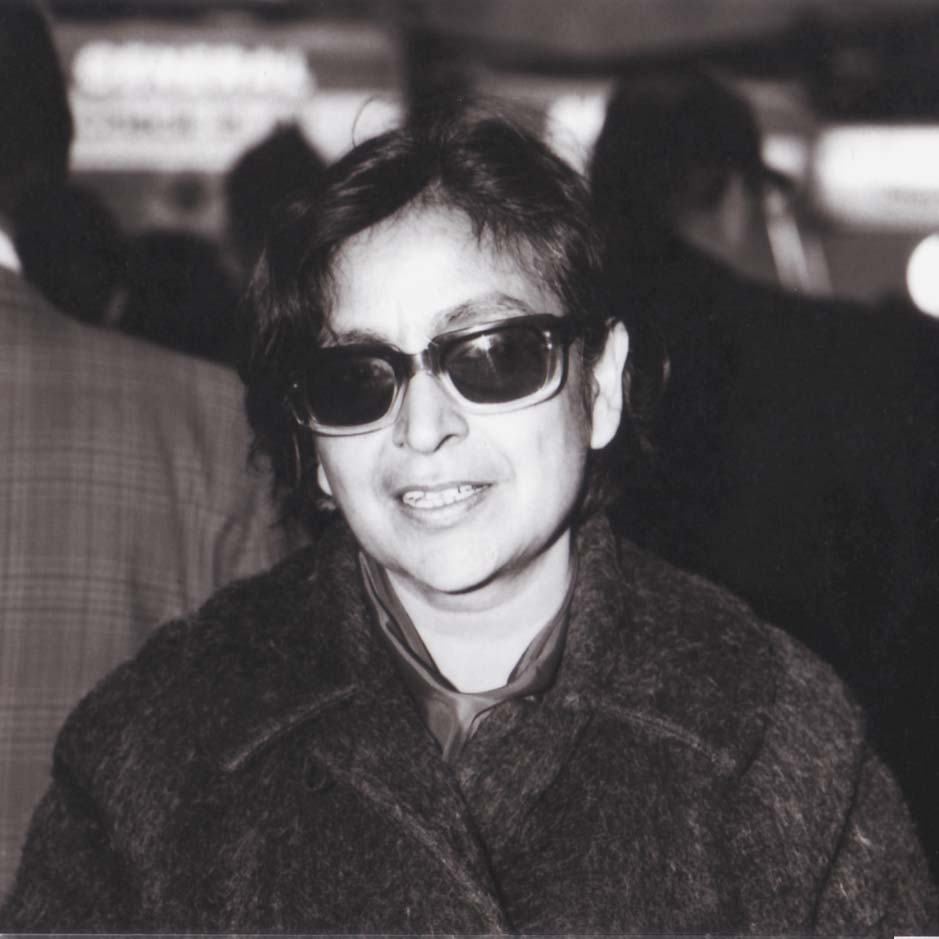
Amrita Pritam at Heathrow Airport, London in 1971.

In 1935, Amrita married Pritam Singh, son of a hosiery merchant of Lahore's Anarkali Bazaar. They had two children together, a son and a daughter. She had an unrequited affection for poet Sahir Ludhianvi. The story of this love is depicted in her autobiography, Rasidi Ticket (Revenue Stamp). When another woman, singer Sudha Malhotra came into Sahir's life, Amrita found solace in the companionship of the artist and writer Inderjeet Imroz. She spent the last forty years of her life with Imroz, who also designed most of her book covers and made her the subject of several of his paintings. Their life together is also the subject of a book, Amrita Imroz: A Love Story.

She died in her sleep on 31 October 2005 at the age of 86 in New Delhi, after battling a long illness. She was survived by her partner Imroz, daughter Kandlla, son Navraj Kwatra, daughter-in-law Alka, and her grandchildren, Kartik, Noor, Aman and Shilpi. Navraj Kwatra was found murdered in his Borivali apartment in 2012. Three men were accused of the murder but were acquitted due to lack of evidence.

== Legacy ==
In 2007, an audio album titled, 'Amrita recited by Gulzar' was released by noted lyricist Gulzar, with poems of Amrita Pritam recited by him. A film on her life is also in production. On 31 August 2019, Google honoured her by commemorating her 100th birth anniversary with a Doodle. The accompanying write-up read, "Today’s Doodle celebrates Amrita Pritam, one of history’s foremost female Punjabi writers, who 'dared to live the life she imagines.' Born in Gujranwala, British India, 100 years ago today, Pritam published her first collection of verse at the age of 16."

== Bibliography ==
Novels

- Pinjar
- Doctor Dev
- Kore Kagaz, Unchas Din
- Dharti, Sagar aur Seepian
- Rang ka Patta
- Dilli ki Galiyan
- Terahwan Suraj
- Yaatri
- Jilavatan (1968)
- Hardatt Ka Zindaginama

Autobiographies

- Black Rose (1968)
- Rasidi Ticket (1976)
- Shadows of Words (2004)

Short stories

- Kahaniyan jo Kahaniyan Nahi
- Kahaniyon ke Angan mein
- Stench of Kerosene

Poetry anthologies

- Amrit Lehran (Immortal Waves) (1936)
- Jiunda Jiwan (The Exuberant Life) (1939)
- Trel Dhote Phul (1942)
- O Gitan Valia (1942)
- Badlam De Laali (1943)
- Sanjh de laali (1943)
- Lok Peera (The People's Anguish) (1944)
- Pathar Geetey (The Pebbles) (1946)
- Punjab Di Aawaaz (1952)
- Sunehade (Messages) (1955) – Sahitya Akademi Award
- Ashoka Cheti (1957)
- Kasturi (1957)
- Nagmani (1964)
- Ik Si Anita (1964)
- Chak Nambar Chatti (1964)
- Uninja Din (49 Days) (1979)
- Kagaz Te Kanvas (1981) - Bhartiya Jnanpith
- Chuni Huyee Kavitayen
- Ek Baat

Literary journals

- Nagmani, poetry monthly

== See also ==
- List of Indian writers
- List of Indian poets
