= List of English words of Indian origin =

This is a list of words in the English language that originated in the languages of India.

== Other languages ==
- Adda, from Bengali, a group of people
- Bhut jolokia, from Assamese (ভূত জলকীয়া Bhut Zôlôkiya), a hot chili found in Assam and other parts of Northeast India
- Jute from Bengali, a fiber

== Marathi ==
- Doolally, from Marathi word देवळाली. "mad, insane" from the town of Deolali
- Mongoose, from Marathi word मुंगूस (Muṅgūsa)
