= List of Hindi films of 2007 =

This is a list of Bollywood films that were released in 2007.

== Box office figures ==
Top 10 highest grossing Hindi films of 2007.

Rank	Title	Director	Worldwide gross
1	Om Shanti Om	Farah Khan	₹152 crore
2	Welcome	Anees Bazmee	₹122 crore
3	Chak De! India	Shimit Amin	₹109 crore
4	Partner	David Dhawan	₹101 crore
5	Taare Zameen Par	Aamir Khan	₹98.48 crore
6	Heyy Babyy	Sajid Khan	₹84 crore
7	Guru	Mani Ratnam	₹83.67 crore
8	Bhool Bhulaiyaa	Priyadarshan	₹83 crore
9	Namastey London	Vipul Amrutlal Shah	₹71.4 crore
10	Ta Ra Rum Pum	Siddharth Anand	₹70 crore

== List of released films ==
=== January–March ===
Opening		Title	Director	Cast	Genre	Production house
J A N	12	Anwar	Manish Jha	Siddharth Koirala, Rajpal Yadav, Nauheed Cyrusi, Vijay Raaz, Manisha Koirala, Sudhir Pandey, Hiten Tejwani, Rasika Dugal	Drama	Dayal Creations
J A N	12	Guru	Mani Ratnam	Abhishek Bachchan, Aishwarya Rai, Arjan Bajwa, Mithun Chakraborty, Vidya Balan, R. Madhavan	Drama, romance	Madras Talkies
J A N	19	Risk	Vishram Sawant	Vinod Khanna, Randeep Hooda, Tanushree Dutta, Seema Biswas	Action, drama	K Sera Sera
J A N	25	Salaam-e-Ishq: A Tribute to Love	Nikhil Advani	Salman Khan, Akshaye Khanna, Priyanka Chopra, Anil Kapoor, Ayesha Takia, Juhi Chawla, Vidya Balan, John Abraham, Sohail Khan, Isha Koppikar, Govinda, Shannon Esra, Vishal Malhotra, Anjana Sukhani	Romance	Eros International, Orion Pictures, MAD Entertainment
F E B	2	Traffic Signal	Madhur Bhandarkar	Kunal Khemu, Neetu Chandra, Naseer Abdullah, Vinay Apte, Konkona Sen Sharma, Ranvir Shorey, Gopal K Singh	Drama	Percept Picture Company, Bhandarkar Entertainment
F E B	9	Black Friday	Anurag Kashyap	Kay Kay Menon, Pavan Malhotra, Aditya Srivastava, Imtiaz Ali, Pratima Kazmi, Zakir Hussain	Crime, drama, historical	Adlabs, Mid Day Multimedia
F E B	16	Eklavya: The Royal Guard	Vidhu Vinod Chopra	Amitabh Bachchan, Sharmila Tagore, Sanjay Dutt, Saif Ali Khan, Vidya Balan, Jimmy Sheirgill, Jackie Shroff, Raima Sen	Drama	Eros International, Vinod Chopra Films
F E B	23	Haseena	Vicky Ranawat	Isha Koppikar, Raj Babbar, Kiran Janjani, Preeti Jhangiani	Thriller	Sanjay Entertainment Pvt. Ltd.
F E B	23	Honeymoon Travels Pvt. Ltd.	Reema Kagti	Shabana Azmi, Boman Irani, Amisha Patel, Sandhya Mridul, Diya Mirza, Minissha Lamba, Kay Kay Menon, Arjun Rampal, Ranvir Shorey, Raima Sen, Karan Khanna, Vikram Chatwal, Ayaz Khan, Abhay Deol	Comedy, drama, romance	Excel Entertainment
M A R	2	Nehlle Pe Dehlla	Ajay Chandhok	Sanjay Dutt, Saif Ali Khan, Bipasha Basu, Kim Sharma	Comedy	Dhariwal Films
M A R	2	Nishabd	Ram Gopal Varma	Amitabh Bachchan, Jiah Khan, Aftab Shivdasani, Revathi	Drama	Adlabs, RGV Film Factory
M A R	9	Water	Deepa Mehta	Seema Biswas, Lisa Ray, John Abraham, Waheeda Rehman, Sarala Kariyawasam, Manorama, Raghubir Yadav, Vinay Pathak	Drama	Fox Searchlight Pictures, B.R. Films, Mongrel Media, Hamilton/Mehta Productions, Telefilm Canada, Noble Nomad Pictures, Echo Lake Entertainment
M A R	9	1971	Amrit Sagar	Manoj Bajpai, Ravi Kishan, Manav Kaul, Bikramjeet Kanwarpal, Deepak Dobriyal, Piyush Mishra	War	Sagar Arts, Studio 18
M A R	9	Red: The Dark Side	Vikram Bhatt	Aftab Shivdasani, Amrita Arora, Celina Jaitly	Thriller	T.A Shah Group of Companies, Horseshoe Pictues Pvt. Ltd
M A R	16	Hattrick	Milan Luthria	Paresh Rawal, Rimi Sen, Kunal Kapoor, Nana Patekar, Danny Denzongpa, Asawari Joshi, John Abraham, Manoj Pahwa	Comedy	UTV Motion Pictures
M A R	16	Just Married	Meghna Gulzar	Fardeen Khan, Esha Deol, Eijaz Khan, Anupam Kher, Kirron Kher, Satish Shah	Drama, romance, social, comedy	Pritish Nandy Communications
M A R	23	My Bollywood Bride	Rajeev Virani	Jason Lewis, Kashmera Shah, Sanjay Suri, Gulshan Grover	Romance	Hiskarma Productions, Dream Team Films
M A R	23	Namastey London	Vipul Amrutlal Shah	Akshay Kumar, Katrina Kaif, Rishi Kapoor, Upen Patel, Riteish Deshmukh, Javed Sheikh, Clive Standen, Nina Wadia	Romance, comedy, drama, social	Adlabs Films, Blockbuster Movie Entertainers, Eros International
M A R	23	The Namesake	Mira Nair	Kal Penn, Tabu, Irrfan Khan, Sahira Nair	Drama	Fox Searchlight Pictures, UTV Motion Pictures, Mirabai Films, Entertainment Farm
M A R	30	Delhii Heights	Anand Kumar	Jimmy Sheirgill, Neha Dhupia, R Madhavan, Rohit Roy, Simone Singh, Om Puri	Drama	Sivaji Productions, Madhu Entertainment
M A R	30	Say Salaam India	Subhash Kapoor	Sanjay Suri, Sandhya Mridul, Aditya Seal, Milind Soman	Cricket	Credence Motion Pictures, Speaking Tree Films

=== April–June ===
Opening		Title	Director	Cast	Genre	Production house
A P R	6	Shakalaka Boom Boom	Suneel Darshan	Bobby Deol, Upen Patel, Kangana Ranaut, Celina Jaitly, Anupam Kher, Govind Namdev	Drama, social, musical, romance	Shree Krishna International, Shemaroo Entertainment
A P R	13	Big Brother	Guddu Dhanoa	Sunny Deol, Priyanka Chopra, Danny Denzongpa, Raju Srivastava	Action, drama, romance, crime	Vijayta Films, Bhagwan Chitra Mandir
A P R	13	Bheja Fry	Sagar Ballary	Vinay Pathak, Sarika, Ranvir Shorey, Rajat Kapoor, Milind Soman	Comedy	Handmade Films, Adlabs
A P R	13	Life Mein Kabhie Kabhiee	Vikram Bhatt	Dino Morea, Aftab Shivdasani, Anjori Alagh, Nauheed Cyrusi, Sameer Dattani, Anuj Sawhney	Thriller	Gangani Multimedia Corporations, Srishti Creations
A P R	20	Aur Pappu Paas Ho Gaya	S. Soni	Krishna Abhishek, Kashmera Shah, Sikandar Kharbanda, Jackie Shroff	Comedy	Real Square Production
A P R	20	Kya Love Story Hai	Lovely Singh	Tusshar Kapoor, Ayesha Takia, Kareena Kapoor, Shahid Kapoor	Romance	Studio 18, Adlabs, VR Entertainers
A P R	27	Ta Ra Rum Pum	Siddharth Anand	Saif Ali Khan, Rani Mukerji, Javed Jaffrey, Shruti Seth, Master Ali Haji, Aarti Chabria	Romance, drama, social	Yash Raj Films
M A Y	4	Yatra	Gautam Ghose	Rekha, Nana Patekar, Deepti Naval	Drama	Shree Venkatesh Films
M A Y	11	Good Boy, Bad Boy	Ashwini Chaudhary	Emraan Hashmi, Tusshar Kapoor, Isha Sharvani, Tanushree Dutta, Paresh Rawal	Comedy	Mukta Arts
M A Y	11	Life in a... Metro	Anurag Basu	Dharmendra, Irrfan Khan, Kay Kay Menon, Sharman Joshi, Shiney Ahuja, Shilpa Shetty, Kangana Ranaut, Konkana Sen Sharma, Ashwin Mushran, Manoj Pahwa	Drama	UTV Motion Pictures
M A Y	18	Ek Chalis Ki Last Local	Sanjay Khanduri	Abhay Deol, Neha Dhupia, Deepak Shirke, Ashwin Mushran, Nawazuddin Siddiqui, Snehal Dabi, Ashok Samarth, Sunita Rajwar	Comedy, thriller	Quartet Films
M A Y	18	Raqeeb	Anurag Singh	Rahul Khanna, Jimmy Sheirgill, Sharman Joshi, Tanushree Dutta	Romance, thriller	Inderjit Films Combine
M A Y	25	Cheeni Kum	R. Balki	Amitabh Bachchan, Tabu, Paresh Rawal, Zohra Sehgal	Romance, comedy, drama	Eros International, MAD Entertainment
M A Y	25	Shootout at Lokhandwala	Apoorva Lakhia	Amitabh Bachchan, Sanjay Dutt, Sunil Shetty, Vivek Oberoi, Tusshar Kapoor, Arbaaz Khan, Abhishek Bachchan, Neha Dhupia, Dia Mirza, Aarti Chabria, Amrita Singh, Rohit Roy	Action, crime, drama	White Feather Films, Balaji Motion Pictures
J U N	1	Fool & Final	Ahmed Khan	Arbaaz Khan, Sunny Deol, Shahid Kapoor, Vivek Oberoi, Ayesha Takia, Jackie Shroff, Paresh Rawal, Sameera Reddy, Gulshan Grover, Om Puri, Sharmila Tagore, Johnny Lever	Action, comedy, romance, musical	Base Industries Group
J U N	8	Dharm	Bhavna Talwar	Pankaj Kapur, Hrishitaa Bhatt, Supriya Pathak	Drama	WSG Pictures
J U N	8	MP3: Mera Pehla Pehla Pyaar	Robbie Grewal	Ruslaan Mumtaz, Hazel Crowney, Gaurav Gera, Manoj Pahwa	Romance	Percept Picture Company
J U N	8	Red Swastik	Vinod Pande	Sherlyn Chopra, Deepshika	Erotic, thriller	Rainspirit Films
J U N	8	Swami	Ganesh Acharya	Manoj Bajpai, Juhi Chawla	Drama	Pushpa Krishna Creations
J U N	8	The Train	Hasnain Hyderabadwala, Raksha Mistry	Emraan Hashmi, Geeta Basra, Rajat Bedi, Sayali Bhagat, Suresh Menon	Drama, romance, thriller	Siddhi Vinayak Films
J U N	15	Jhoom Barabar Jhoom	Shaad Ali	Abhishek Bachchan, Preity Zinta, Bobby Deol, Lara Dutta, Amitabh Bachchan, Piyush Mishra	Romance, comedy	Yash Raj Films
J U N	22	Chain Kulii Ki Main Kulii	Karanjeet Saluja	Zain Khan, Rahul Bose, Meera Vasudevan, Nassar Abdullah	Fantasy, sports comedy, cricket	Saregama Films
J U N	29	Aap Kaa Surroor	Prashant Chadha	Himesh Reshammiya, Hansika Motwani, Mallika Sherawat, Darshan Jariwala, Raj Babbar	Drama, thriller, romance	Mehboob Studio, Adlabs
J U N	29	Apne	Anil Sharma	Dharmendra, Sunny Deol, Bobby Deol, Shilpa Shetty, Katrina Kaif, Divya Dutta, Kirron Kher, Kurush Deboo, Aryan Vaid, Victor Banerjee	Family, drama, sports	Prime Focus, Glamour Entertainment
J U N	29	Awarapan	Mohit Suri	Emraan Hashmi, Shriya Saran, Salil Acharya, Mrinalini Sharma, Ashish Vidyarthi, Ashutosh Rana, Purab Kohli, Rehan Khan	Action, drama	Vishesh Films

=== July–September ===
Opening		Title	Director	Cast	Genre	Production house
J U L	6	Journey Bombay to Goa	Raj Pendurkar	Sunil Pal, Raju Shrivastav, Asrani, Vijay Raaz, Tinu Anand, Ehsaan Qureshi, Aasif Sheikh	Comedy	Eros International
J U L	6	My Friend Ganesha	Rajiv S Ruia	Ahsaas Channa, Kiran Janjani, Shital Shah, Upasana Singh	Children, animation	Radiant Animation, Koffee Break Pictures
J U L	6	Jahan Jaaeyega Hamen Paaeyega	Janmendra Ahuja	Govinda, Sakshi Sivanand, Krishna Abhishek, Vinay Anand, Sharat Saxena, Mukesh Rishi, Kader Khan, Raju Srivastav	Comedy	L.R.B International
J U L	13	Naqaab	Abbas Mustan	Bobby Deol, Akshaye Khanna, Urvashi Sharma, Vishal Malhotra, Vikas Kalantri	Romance, thriller	Tips Industries
J U L	20	Partner	David Dhawan	Salman Khan, Govinda, Lara Dutta, Katrina Kaif, Aarti Chabria, Rajat Bedi, Rajpal Yadav, Dalip Tahil	Comedy, romance	Eros International, K Sera Sera, Sohail Khan Productions
A U G	3	Cash	Anubhav Sinha	Ajay Devgn, Sunil Shetty, Zayed Khan, Riteish Deshmukh, Esha Deol, Shamita Shetty, Dia Mirza, Ayesha Takia	Thriller, action	Adlabs, Seven Entertainment Ltd, Sohail Maklai Entertainment Pvt Ltd
A U G	3	Gandhi, My Father	Feroz Abbas Khan	Akshaye Khanna, Shefali Shah, Bhumika Chawla, Darshan Jariwala	Drama, historical	Eros International, Anil Kapoor Films Company
A U G	10	Chak De! India	Shimit Amin	Shah Rukh Khan, Sagarika Ghatge, Vivan Bhatena, Vidya Malvade, Chitrashi Rawat, Seema Azmi, Nakul Vaid, Vibha Chibber	Sports	Yash Raj Films
A U G	10	Kaafila	Ammtoje Mann	Sunny Deol, Sara Loren, Chandan Anand, Sudesh Berry, Sana Nawaz	Action, patriotic	Mannerism Films
A U G	17	Buddha Mar Gaya	Rahul Rawail	Ranvir Shorey, Rakhi Sawant, Anupam Kher, Om Puri, Paresh Rawal	Comedy	Eros International, Rahul Theaters International
A U G	17	Marigold	Willard Carroll	Salman Khan, Ali Larter	Romantic, musical	Adlabs
A U G	24	Heyy Babyy	Sajid Khan	Akshay Kumar, Riteish Deshmukh, Fardeen Khan, Vidya Balan, Boman Irani, Anupam Kher, Vrajesh Hirjee, Muskaan Mihani	Comedy, drama, romance	Eros International, Nadiadwala Grandson Entertainment
A U G	31	Aag	Ram Gopal Varma	Amitabh Bachchan, Urmila Matondkar, Ajay Devgn, Sushmita Sen, Nisha Kothari, Mohanlal, Prashant Raj Sachdev, Rajpal Yadav	Action, thriller	Adlabs, RGV Film Factory
A U G	31	Dhokha	Pooja Bhatt	Muzammil Ibrahim, Tulip Joshi, Ashutosh Rana, Anupam Kher, Gulshan Grover, Aushima Sawhney	Action, thriller	Vishesh Films, Fish Eye Network
A U G	31	Victoria No. 203	Anant Mahadevan	Om Puri, Anupam Kher, Jimmy Sheirgill, Preeti Jhangiani, Kamal Sadanah, Javed Jaffrey, Johnny Lever	Comedy	T.A Shah Group of Companies
S E P	7	Apna Asmaan	Kaushik Roy	Irrfan Khan, Shobana, Nassar Abdullah, Anupam Kher, Rajat Kapoor	Drama, children	ImaginationWorks
S E P	7	Darling	Ram Gopal Verma	Fardeen Khan, Isha Koppikar, Zakir Hussain, Esha Deol, Nisha Kothari	Thriller, horror, romance, mystery	T-Series Films, Balaji Motion Pictures
S E P	7	Dhamaal	Indra Kumar	Javed Jaffrey, Sanjay Dutt, Riteish Deshmukh, Arshad Warsi, Aashish Chaudhary, Manoj Pahwa, Murali Sharma, Asrani, Vijay Raaz, Kurush Deboo	Comedy	Maruti International
S E P	14	Aggar	Anant Mahadevan	Shreyas Talpade, Tushar Kapoor, Udita Goswami, Vikas Kalantri, Suresh Menon	Drama, thriller	Siddhi Vinayak Creations
S E P	14	Nanhe Jaisalmer	Samir Karnik	Bobby Deol, Dwij Yadav, Katrina Kaif, Sharat Saxena	Drama	Eros International, K Sera Sera
S E P	21	Dhol	Priyadarshan	Sharman Joshi, Tusshar Kapoor, Kunal Khemu, Rajpal Yadav, Tanushree Dutta, Murli Sharma, Om Puri, Arbaaz Khan	Comedy	Percept Picture Company, Adlabs
S E P	21	Manorama Six Feet Under	Navdeep Singh	Abhay Deol, Nawazuddin Siddiqui, Raima Sen, Gul Panag, Vinay Pathak	Thriller	Shemaroo Entertainment
S E P	28	Dil Dosti Etc	Manish Tiwary	Shreyas Talpade, Nikita Anand, Imaad Shah, Smriti Mishra, Ishita Sharma	Drama, coming-of-age	Prakash Jha Productions, Adlabs
S E P	28	Johnny Gaddaar	Sriram Raghavan	Neil Nitin Mukesh, Dharmendra, Vinay Pathak, Zakir Hussain, Rimi Sen, Dayanand Shetty	Thriller	Adlabs

=== October–December ===
Opening		Title	Director	Cast	Genre	Production house
O C T	5	Chhodon Naa Yaar	Dillip Sood	Jimmy Sheirgill, Kim Sharma, Kabir Sadanand	Horror	Swadeshi Entertainment
O C T	5	Go	Manish Shrivastava	Gautam Gupta, Nisha Kothari, Ravi Bhatia, Kay Kay Menon, Rajpal Yadav	Romance, drama	RGV Films
O C T	5	50 Lakh	Chandra Sekhar Yeleti	Pawan Malhotra, Mohit Chadda, Shashank, Abhishek, Janardhan, and Sindhu Tolani	Thriller	Just Yellow Media
O C T	12	Bhool Bhulaiyaa	Priyadarshan	Akshay Kumar, Vidya Balan, Rajpal Yadav, Amisha Patel, Shiney Ahuja, Kaveri Jha, Paresh Rawal, Vineeth	Mystery, thriller, comedy	T-Series Films, Balaji Motion Pictures, Raksha Entertainment
O C T	12	Laaga Chunari Mein Daag	Pradeep Sarkar	Jaya Bachchan, Rani Mukerji, Abhishek Bachchan, Konkona Sen Sharma, Kunal Kapoor, Anupam Kher	Drama	Yash Raj Films
O C T	19	Speed	Vikram Bhatt	Sanjay Suri, Zayed Khan, Urmila Matondkar, Sophie Choudry, Aftab Shivdasani, Tanushree Dutta, Amrita Arora, Aashish Chaudhary	Action, thriller	Baweja Studios
O C T	26	Bal Ganesh	Pankaj Sharma	Ashar Shaikh, Adarsh Gautam, Namrata Sawhney	Animation	Shemaroo Entertainment, Astute Media Vision/Pankaj Productions
O C T	26	Jab We Met	Imtiaz Ali	Shahid Kapoor, Kareena Kapoor, Tarun Arora, Saumya Tandon, Pawan Malhotra, Dara Singh	Romance, comedy	Shree Ashtavinayak Cine Vision, Indian Films
O C T	26	Mumbai Salsa	Manoj Tyagi	Vir Das, Linda Arsenio, Manjari Phadnis, Dilip Thadeshwar	Romance, drama	BVG Films, ASA Productions and Enterprises
O C T	26	No Smoking	Anurag Kashyap	John Abraham, Ayesha Takia, Paresh Rawal, Ranvir Shorey, Bipasha Basu	Drama, thriller	Eros International, Big Screen Entertainment, Vishal Bhardwaj Films
N O V	9	Om Shanti Om	Farah Khan	Shah Rukh Khan, Deepika Padukone, Arjun Rampal, Shreyas Talpade, Kiron Kher, Asawari Joshi, Bindu, Yuvika Chaudhary, Satish Shah	Action, romance, comedy, drama	Eros International, Red Chillies Entertainment
N O V	9	Saawariya	Sanjay Leela Bhansali	Ranbir Kapoor, Sonam Kapoor, Rani Mukerji, Salman Khan	Drama, romance	Columbia Pictures, Sanjay Leela Bhansali Films
N O V	23	Goal	Vivek Agnihotri	John Abraham, Bipasha Basu, Kushal Punjabi, Arshad Warsi, Boman Irani	Sports	UTV Motion Pictures, Bindass
N O V	30	Aaja Nachle	Anil Mehta	Madhuri Dixit, Akshaye Khanna, Vinay Pathak, Kunal Kapoor, Konkona Sen Sharma, Ranvir Shorey, Irrfan Khan, Jugal Hansraj	Musical	Yash Raj Films
N O V	30	Gauri: The Unborn	Akku Akbar	Rituparna Sengupta, Atul Kulkarni	Horror	Shogun Films
D E C	7	Dus Kahaniyaan	Sanjay Gupta, Apoorva Lakhia, Meghna Gulzar, Rohit Roy, Hansal Mehta, Jasmeet Dhodhi	Sanjay Dutt, Sunil Shetty, Arbaaz Khan, Nana Patekar, Dino Morea, Manoj Bajpai, Aftab Shivdasani, Diya Mirza, Amrita Singh, Neha Dhupia, Minissha Lamba, Tarina Patel, Naseeruddin Shah, Shabana Azmi, Anupam Kher, Natassha	Drama	White Feather Films, Eros International
D E C	7	Khoya Khoya Chand	Sudhir Mishra	Shiney Ahuja, Soha Ali Khan, Sushmita Mukherjee, Vinay Pathak, Rajat Kapoor, Sonya Jehan	Romance, drama	Adlabs, Prakash Jha Productions
D E C	14	Strangers	Aanand L. Rai	Jimmy Sheirgill, Kay Kay Menon, Nandana Sen, Sonali Kulkarni	Drama	Rise2Shine Productions, Indorama Films
D E C	21	Taare Zameen Par	Aamir Khan	Aamir Khan, Darsheel Safary, Tisca Chopra, Vipin Sharma, Tanay Chheda, Sachet Engineer	Drama	UTV Motion Pictures, Aamir Khan Productions, PVR Pictures
D E C	21	Welcome	Anees Bazmee	Akshay Kumar, Nana Patekar, Anil Kapoor, Katrina Kaif, Mallika Sherawat, Paresh Rawal, Feroz Khan	Comedy	Base Industries Group, UTV Motion Pictures, Indian Films
D E C	28	Return of Hanuman	Anurag Kashyap	Pinky Rajput, Malak Shah, Suraj, Uday Sabnis, Dhananjai Shrestha, Ayesha Raza, Chetanya Adib, Rajeev Raj, Sudesh Bhosale, Rajendra Gupta	Animation, children	Percept Picture Company, Toonz Animation, Anurag Kashyap Films
D E C	28	Showbiz	Raju Khan	Tushar Jalota, Mrinalini Sharma, Gulshan Grover, Delnaaz Irani, Sushant Singh	Musical, drama	Vishesh Films

== See also ==
- List of Bollywood films of 2008
- List of Bollywood films of 2006
