= Deepak Saraswat =

Indian actor

- Occupations: Social activist Film maker
- Years active: 2011–present

Deepak Saraswat is an Indian Social activist and Film maker who raised funds for people stuck in Lockdown due to COVID-19 in India. He has directed and produced some movies and TV programs.

== Career ==
Deepak Saraswat started his career as an actor with Savdhaan India, Crime Patrol. Later he worked in Zee TV's Jodha Akbar and other TV serials. Saraswat raised funds for needles in the COVID-19 lockdown in India. He has also produced the film Roohani.

== Filmography ==
=== Television ===
Year	Title	Channel	Note
2011-2014	Savdhaan India	Life OK	As an actor
2015	Jodha Akbar	Zee TV	Jahandar Shah
2015-2016	Crime Patrol	Sony TV	As an actor
2017	Baal Krishna	Big Magic	Singhasur
2021	Vighnaharta Ganesh	Sony TV	Kinthur

== Movies ==
Key
†	Denotes films that have not yet been released

Year	Film	Notes
2019	Roohani	starring Sunil Pal, Ahsaan Qureshi
