= Nafisa =

Nafisa or also spelled as Nafeesa, Nafesa and Nafisah is an Arabic feminine given name meaning valuable, precious, extremely desired. Its literal meaning is "something so good and valuable that people compete for it", derived from the N-F-S root ("to breathe, to compete"), which is mentioned in many places in the Quran.

== People with the given name ==
Notable people with the name include:

=== Nafisa ===
- Nafisa Abdullaeva (born 1978), Uzbek lawyer
- Nafisa Abdullahi, (born 1991) Nigerian Kannywood actress
- Nafisa al-Bayda (1743–1816), Egyptian diplomat and philanthropist
- Nafisa Abu Bakr al-Malik (born 1932), Sudanese political figure and teacher
- Nafisa Ali (born 1957), Indian actress and model
- Nafisa Ameen, Pakistani politician
- Nafisa Joseph (1978–2004), Indian model and television personality
- Nafisa Kamal (born 1989), Bangladeshi businessperson and cricket franchise owner
- Nafisa Muminova (born 1990), Uzbekistani chess player
- Nafisa Naomi, known simply as "Nafisa", Indian Australian artist, finalist in the 2010 Archibald Prize
- Nafisa Shah (born 1968), Pakistani politician
- Nafisah Ahmad Zen Shahab, Indonesian businessperson
- Nafisa Sheripboeva (born 2001), Uzbekistani Paralympic judoka

=== Nafeesa ===
- Nafeesa Inayatullah Khan Khattak, Pakistani politician
- Nafeesa Shayeq (fl. 1970s), Afghan magazine editor and feminist

=== Nafisah ===
- Nafisah Ahmad al-Amin, Sudanese politician
- Nafisah Ahmad Zen Shahab (born 1946), Indonesian businessperson

== People with the surname ==
- Haniya Nafisa (born 2003), Indian actress and singer
- Sayyida Nafisa (d. 830 CE), Muslim scholar
