= Hello Kaun? Pehchaan Kaun! =

- Promotional image
- Country of origin: India
- Original language: Hindi

Original release
- Network: STAR One
- Release: 27 December 2008 – 5 April 2009

Hello Kaun? Pehchaan Kaun! (transl. Hello, Who Is It? You Guess!) is an Indian game show where the contestants impersonate a famous celebrity. The show aired on STAR One from 27 December 2008 to 5 April 2009.

== Overview ==
The show is hosted by well-known impersonator Navin Prabhakar, who first shot to fame from his celebrated appearances in the show The Great Indian Laughter Challenge (season one). Prabhakar mimics different celebrities in different episodes. He has mimicked well-known actors Jeetendra, Pran, Johnny Walker, Kamal Hasan, Sunil Dutt, and several others. His own performance is inarguably one of the best mimicries in the entire show. The show is innovative as the first a mimicry contest on Indian TV.

The show is judged by Chunky Pandey and Suresh Menon.

The name of the show is a take on the catchphrase Pehchan Kaun (translation: Guess Who?) first popularized by Navin Prabhakar in his appearances in The Great Indian Laughter Challenge. After several dialogues of Sholay entered into the psyche and mannerisms of Indians, this is perhaps the first catchphrase to do so.

== Contestants ==
- Rooesh Mirkap as Hrithik Roshan
- Vishal Gaba as Himmesh Reshammia
- Sumedh as Aamir Khan
- Rameshwar Mahajan as Johnny Lever
- Raja Sagoo as Salman Khan
- Sanjay Keni as Arshad Warsi
- Mukesh Patel as Dhoni
- Deepak Kumar as Ritesh Deshmukh
- KT as Ajay Devgan
- Abhin Sinha as Akshaye Khanna
- Sandeep as Jim Carrey
- Rajkumar Prashad as Baba Ramdev
- Rajat Bhaghat as Salmaan khan
- Siraj Khan as Laloo Yadav & Nana Patekar

== Hosts ==
- Navin Prabhakar
- Aishwarya Sakhuja

== Judges ==
- Chunky Pandey
- Suresh Menon

== See also ==
- The Great Indian Laughter Challenge
