= Ab Hoga Dharna Unlimited =

- Theatrical release poster
- Directed by: Deepak Tanwar
- Written by: Naveen Batra
- Produced by: Chandra Bhushan Singh; Deepak Tanwar
- Starring: Saurabh Malik; Rekha Rana; Omkar Das Manikpuri; Sunil Pal; Ehsaan Qureshi
- Cinematography: Basha Lal
- Music by: Shankar Sahney
- Release date: 13 April 2012
- Country: India
- Language: Hindi

Ab Hoga Dharna Unlimited (transl. Now there will be justice unlimited) is a 2012 Bollywood comedy-drama film directed by Deepak Tanwar. The film stars Sunil Pal, Ehsaan Qureshi, Omkar Das Manikpuri, Rekha Rana, and Saurabh Malik.

== Cast ==
- Saurabh Malik as Rahul
- Rekha Rana as Priya
- Omkar Das Manikpuri as Satya
- Manoj Bakshi as Kantelel
- Milind Gunaji as Minister
- Sunil Pal as Lakshman Dev Baba
- Ehsaan Qureshi as Tillu
- Sunil Parashar
- Mushtaq Khan
- Chandra Bhushan Singh
- Deepak Tanwar

== Critical response ==
Srijana Mitra Das of The Times of India gave 2.5 out 5 and said " It has rather modest production values but some great lines. It retains the traditional love-story (to its detriment) but goes out on a limb satirizing the political. It's commenting on what's currently happening but in ways not everyone's going to like. It's a cheeky little film - but you may find the laughter a challenge".
