= Money Back Guarantee (2014 film) =

- Poster of the film
- Directed by: Sunil Pal
- Written by: Sunil Pal
- Screenplay by: Sunil Pal
- Story by: Sunil pal
- Produced by: Sarita Pal
- Starring: Sunil Pal; Ganesh Acharya; Ahsaan Qureshi; Yashpal Sharma; Mukesh Khanna
- Edited by: Santosh Kumar (Promos)
- Music by: Deen Mohd; Saral-Prabal
- Release date: 14 November 2014
- Running time: 119 minutes
- Country: India
- Language: Hindi
- Budget: ₹ 10 million
- Box office: ₹ 1.77 million

Money Back Guarantee is a 2014 Indian Hindi language comedy film, directed by Sunil Pal and produced by his wife Sarita Pal. This film is the second to be directed by the stand-up comedian Sunil Pal under his production house, Pal Films.

== Plot summary ==
The film tells the story of a common man who falls prey to a greedy guru. It revolves around how fake advice is given by spiritual gurus to their followers and how a duped follower takes revenge in his own way. The protagonist of the film is a little boy who aspires to be a superstar but his teacher steals all of his money as a domestic loan and never pays it back.

== Cast ==
- Sunil Pal
- Raju Shrivastav
- Mukesh Khanna
- Ganesh Acharya
- Ahsaan Qureshi
- Khayaali
- Bharti Singh
- Dhananjay Galani
- Rajkumar Kanojia
