= Bombay to Goa =

Bombay to Goa may refer to:

- Bombay to Goa (1972 film), an Indian Hindi-language road comedy film
- Bombay to Goa (2007 film), or Journey Bombay to Goa, a remake of the above
