= Sikandar Sanam =

Pakistani stage comedian (1960 – 2012)

- Born: Mohammad Sikandar; 21 September 1960; Karachi, West Pakistan
- Died: 5 November 2012 (aged 52); Karachi, Pakistan
- Occupations: Actor; Comedian; Stage artist; Singer; Screenwriter

Sikandar Sanam (21 September 1960 – 5 November 2012), born Mohammad Sikander, was a Pakistani stage artist, singer, actor, screenwriter and stand-up comedian.

Initially among Umer Shareef's closest associates, he later developed a solo career, mainly by making parodies of modern Bollywood classics such as Tere Naam (2003); he also released albums, his songs also often being parodies.

He used to write the script and the screenplay of most of his spoof films.

== Early life ==
Of Kutchi ethnic background, Sikandar Sanam was born Mohammad Sikander into a family of artists. His father Syed Abdul Sattar Shoqeen Jetpuri was a well known Gujarati poet.

== Career ==
Sikander Sanam started performing on-stage as a child artist and singer. He preferred acting over singing and decided to enter show business. He changed his name from Mohammad Sikandar to Sikandar Sanam (Sanam meaning beloved in Urdu).

== Death ==
Sanam died of liver cancer on 5 November 2012. He left behind his wife, four sons, and two daughters.

Sanam's funeral was offered at the Siddiqui Masjid in Bohra Pir. Several stage artists including Umer Sharif, Rauf Lala, Muhammad Ifraheem, Saleem Afridi, Shakeel Siddiqui, and Aftab Alam attended the prayer. He was buried at the Korangi graveyard, Karachi.

== Filmography ==
=== Stage shows ===
- Bohat Achay Bhai Bohat Achay
- Agwa Bara-e-Tawan
- Direct Hawaldar
- Kaloo Saloo Aur Maloo
- Comedy King's
- Behropia
- Chand Bar-e-Farokht
- One Day Eid Match
- Beauty Parlour
- Flight No 420
- Doctor Aur Qasai
- Eid Tere Naam
- Hanste Raho Chalte Raho
- Hum Sab Eik Hain
- Hum Se Milo
- Laal Qiley Ki Rani Lalokhet ka Raja
- Loot Sale
- Mamu Mazaq Mat Karo
- Akbar-e-Azam in Pakistan
- BEHRUPIYA UMER SHARIF
- Yeh Hai Naya Zamana
- Bakra Munna Bhai
- Paying Guest
- Dulha 2002
- Hanste Raho Chalte Raho
- Meri Bhi to Eid Karade
- Nayee Ammi Purane Abba
- Majno Laila Boyee Ghela (Memoni stage drama)
- Eid aashiqoon ki
- Good Luck Moin Akhter
- Eid Mubarak
- BEBIA MOIN AKHTER
- Bin Bulaye Baraati
- Yahan kay hum sikander

=== Pakistani films ===
- Chorron ke Ghar Chorri
- Zoor

=== Parody films ===
° Tere Naam 2

- pgl 2
- Khal Nayak 2
- Muqaddar Ka Sikandar 2
- Bhola Te Billa
- Sholay 2
- Rambo 007
- Ghanjini 2
- Dabbang 2
- Bodyguard 2
- Singham 2
- Agneepath 2
- Billu Barber 2
- Hum Tum 2
- Munna Bhai MBBS 2

=== Indian television ===
- Funjabi Chakde
- The Great Indian Laughter Challenge
- Comedy Champions
