= Money Back Guarantee =

Money Back Guarantee may refer to:

- Money-back guarantee, a simple guarantee that, if a buyer is not satisfied with a product or service, a refund will be made
- Money Back Guarantee (2014 film), an Indian Hindi-language comedy film
- Money Back Guarantee (2023 film), a Pakistani crime comedy film
- "Money Back Guarantee", a song by Pigeon John, from the album And the Summertime Pool Party

== See also ==
- Money-back policy, insurance policy in India
- Money Back Policy (film), a 2013 Indian film
