= Premacha Jhol Jhal =

Premacha Jhol Jhaal
- Theatrical release poster
- Directed by: Manoj Kotian
- Starring: Siddharth Jadhav; Vijay Patkar; Navin Prabhakar; Smita Gondkar
- Music by: Amitraj
- Release date: 25 October 2013
- Country: India
- Language: Marathi

Premacha Jhol Jhaal is a 2013 Indian Marathi-language film directed by Manoj Kotian. The film stars Siddharth Jadhav, Vijay Patkar, Navin Prabhakar, Smita Gondkar, Tejaswi Patil and Priya Berde. It was theatrically released on 25 October 2013.

== Cast ==
- Siddharth Jadhav
- Vijay Patkar
- Navin Prabhakar
- Smita Gondkar
- Tejaswi Patil
- Priya Berde

== Reception ==
Jaydeep Pathakji from Maharashtra Times wrote, "A comedy film is not made only with the witty actors who create comedy. For that, you have to work hard on the story and screenplay. However, this effort is lacking here. Though the film is worth watching once as a time pass, it fails to produce a 'must-see comedy' ". A reviewer of Divya Marathi stated, "The communication side is extremely weak. There is no stomach-churning dialogue. Such an event is not sown. (Please Sachin, Laksha, Ashok Saraf's Nawari Mile Navryala, Dhoom Dhadaka, etc. should be studied by the directors and screenwriters.) So, don't be surprised if you come out of the theater and wonder what exactly you have seen". A reviewer from The Times of India wrote "It’s how this fun is woven around a script that matters and that’s where this film fails to hold the audience’s interest".
