= Kisko Milega Cash =

- Presented by: Vinod Sherawat
- Country of origin: India
- Original language: Hindi
- No. of seasons: 1
- No. of episodes: 28

Production
- Running time: Approx. 43 minutes per episode
- Production company: Rapid Blue

Original release
- Network: STAR One
- Release: 3 March 2008

Kisko Milega Cash (transl. Who'll get the money) is a reality show aired on STAR One in 2008.

== Guests ==
- Rucha Gujrati
- Renuka Shahane
- Sudha Chandran
- Vidya Malvade
- Shivaji Satam
- Jaya Bhattacharya
