= Raghuveer (film) =

Indian Marathi biographical film

- Directed by: Nilesh Arun Kunjir
- Written by: Abhiram Bhadkamkar
- Produced by: Abhinav Vikas Pathak
- Starring: Vikram Gaikwad; Rujuta Deshmukh
- Cinematography: Dhanraj Wagh & Prathamesh Rangole
- Edited by: Jageshwar Dhobale
- Music by: Ajit Parab
- Release date: 23 August 2024
- Running time: 125 minutes
- Country: India
- Language: Marathi

Raghuveer is a Marathi film based on the life of Samarth Ramdas Swamy. Directed by Nilesh Arun Kunjir, the film stars Vikram Gaikwad, Rujuta Deshmukh and Rahul Mehendale in lead roles.

== Plot ==
The film depicts the journey of Samarth Ramdas Swamy from his childhood to his works, highlighting his unwavering devotion to Hanuman and Lord Rama and his work for the society.

== Cast ==
- Vikram Gaikwad as Narayan (Samarth Ramdas Swamy)
- Rujuta Deshmukh as Ranubai, Narayan's Mother
- Ninad Kulkarni as Young Narayan
- Anushree Phadnis - Deshpande as Vennaswami
- Shailesh Datar as Gopajipant Deshpande
- Vighnesh Joshi as Lord Ram
- Navin Prabhakar as Savji
- Rahul Mehendale as Gangadhar Swami
- Varsha Dandle as Satyabhama
- Devendra Nikharge as Adil Shah
- Bhushan Telang as Hora Bhushan
- Mousumi Tonwalkar as Satibai
- Ganesh Mane as Madhukar

== Soundtrack ==
Raghuveer

Soundtrack album by Ajit Parab
- Released: 2024
- Genre: Feature film soundtrack
- Length: 8:58
- Language: Marathi
- Label: Zee Music Company

Official audio
- Raghuveer - Full Album on YouTube

All music is composed by Ajit Parab.

Track listing
No.	Title	Lyrics	Singer(s)	Length
1.	"Bhramanti"	Mandar Cholkar	Ravindra Sathe & Ajit Parab	03:50
2.	"Danga Budruk"	Mandar Cholkar	Arjun, Adyay, Vivan, Sara & Sanjana	02:53
3.	"Sukh Karta Dukh Harta"	Samarth Ramdas Swami	Charudatta Aphale	02:15
Total length:				08:58

== Release ==
The film was released in theatres on 23 August 2024.

== Reception ==
The film got mostly positive reviews. A reviewer from Sakal rated three stars out of five stars. A reviewer from Lokmat rated three stars out of five stars and write: "This film is a testament to the world-changing work done by Samarth Ramdas Swami to reach the present generation. One should watch this film once to understand the saint's ethics and thoughts." A reviewer from Navshakti rated three stars out of five stars and write: "It is worth noting that Ramdas Swami has been presented on screen with great care, having studied historical documents as well as historical literature." Reshma Raikwar of Loksatta wrote "While writing the biography of saints, one has to be aware that their thoughts and actions will not feed the emotions related to miracles, achievements, etc. This awareness has been maintained while making the biography of Samarth Ramdas Swami through this film."
