= Fuddu =

2016 Indian film directed by Sunil Subramani

- Movie poster
- Directed by: Sunil Subramani
- Written by: Pawan Kumar Sharma
- Produced by: Pradeep Gupta; Mahima Gupta (co-producer); Pawan Kumar Sharma (co-producer); Gandharv Sachdev (co-producer)
- Starring: Shubham Kumar; Swati Kapoor
- Edited by: Shrikant Kelkar
- Music by: Rana Mazumder; Sumeet Bellary
- Production companies: Mahima Productions, ViaMonk Motion Pictures & Paradiso Productions
- Distributed by: PVR Pictures & Project 1
- Release date: 14 October 2016
- Running time: 118 minutes
- Country: India
- Language: Hindi

Fuddu (transl. Moron) is a 2016 Indian Hindi-language romantic comedy film directed by Sunil Subramani. It is produced by Pradeep Gupta, Mahima Gupta, Gandharv Sachdev, and Pawan Kumar Sharma under the banner of Mahima Productions.

The film stars Shubham and Swati Kapoor in lead roles, with Pritosh Sand, Shalini Arora, and Vikki Ahuja playing supporting roles. Sunny Leone was seen in a song, which includes lines recited by Ranbir Kapoor.

== Plot ==
The film depicts the story of Mohan, who has just arrived from Banaras to Mumbai city. He is disturbed to see how people live in cramped houses in the city of Mumbai. His entire world tilts upside down when his wife leaves him for reasons which are untrue. His family discards him and disrespects him.

== Cast ==
- Shubham Kumar as Mohan Mishra
- Swati Kapoor as Shalini
- Shalini Arora
- Shakti Rawal
- Sujeet Pathak
- Vicky Ahuja as Shyam Mishra
- Pawan Shharma as Vijay

Special appearances

- Sunny Leone and Sharman Joshi (special appearance in "Tu Zaroorat Nahi Tu Zaroori Hai")
- Ranbir Kapoor (voiceover in "Tu Zaroorat Nahi Tu Zaroori Hai")
- Gauahar Khan as item number

== Music ==
Music for Fuddu is composed by Rana Majumdar and Sumeet Bellary, while the lyrics have been written by Satya Khare. On 15 September, the teaser for the first song from the movie was released titled as "Tu Zaroorat Nahi Tu Zaroori Hai" featuring Sunny Leone is sung by Shreya Ghoshal and Gandharv Sachdev, while Ranbir Kapoor narrated the shayari part; was released on 19 September. Other confirmed singer are K.K, Sunidhi Chauhan, Arijit Singh, Sumedha Karmahe, Yasser Desai and Mohit Chauhan. All the copyrights of Fuddu Soundtracks are under the label of Zee Music Company.

No.	Title	Singer(s)	Length
1.	"Tu Zaroorat Nahi (Female)"	Shreya Ghoshal
2.	"Ankhen Meri"	Sarosh Sami and Samira Koppikar
3.	"Char Din"	Rana Mazumder and Sachin Sangvi
4.	"Curves Mere Killerr"	Jasmine Sandlas and Sumeet Bellary
5.	"Dik Toh Hai Idiot"	Neeraj Shridhar
6.	"Fuddu Ka Jalwa"	Mohit Chauhan
7.	"Title Track"	Divya Kumar and Anita Hassanandani reddy
8.	"Tu Zaroorat Nahi"	Shreya Ghoshal, Ranbir Kapoor and Gandharv Sachdev
9.	"Tu Zaroorat Nahi (hip hop)"	Shreya Ghoshal and Gandharv Sachdev
10.	"Tu Zaroorat Nahi (male)"	Gandharv Sachdev
11.	"Tum Tum Tum Ho"	Sunidhi Chauhan, Arijit Singh
12.	"Tum Tum Tum Ho (punjabi)"	Arijit Singh, Yasser Desai and Sumedha Karmahe
