= Mere Genie Uncle =

- Theatrical release poster
- Directed by: Ashish Bhavsar
- Screenplay by: Ashish Bhavsar
- Story by: Ashish Bhavsar
- Produced by: Raju Gada; Ashish Bhavsar; Paresh Mehta
- Starring: Tiku Talsania; Swati Kapoor
- Cinematography: Nazir Khan; Palash Bose
- Edited by: Khilav Khorasia, Rajesh Khanchi
- Music by: Dlima Nyzel
- Production company: Aar Motion Pictures
- Release date: 5 June 2015
- Country: India
- Language: Hindi
- Box office: ₹1.75 lakh

Mere Genie Uncle (transl. My Genie Uncle) is an Indian 3D movie directed by Ashish Bhavsar and produced by Raju Gada, Ashish BHavsar and Paresh Mehta. The film stars Tiku Talsania, Swati Kapoor, Shakti Kapoor and Ehsaan Qureshi.

== Cast ==
- Tiku Talsania as Genie/I.M. Patel
- Swati Kapoor as Ria Bannerjee
- Anuj Sikri as Sidd Patel
- Shakti Kapoor as Jr. Jaffar
- Ehsaan Qureshi as Sher Khan
- Navina Bole as Haseena Mallik
- Mushtaq Khan as ATS officer Salunkhe
- Asheish Roy as Guru Ganguly
- Pankaj Kalra as Dhondu Bhai
- Pratham Kalra as Montu
- Yash Acharya as Don
- Ayyan Mallik as Happy Singh
- Jenna Khan as Ronnie
- Hetvi Charla as Beena

== Production ==
Tiku Talsania declared "“I was curious and wanted to be part of a 3D film. And then Mere Genie Uncle happened. After playing Genie, I wish I was one in real life, too. It would be so exciting to grant three wishes (...) The only difficult thing was in applying and removing the blue colour after the shoot..."

== Release ==
The film was released in India in June 2015.

== Soundtrack ==
All Songs are composed and Penned by Vandana Vadhera.

No.	Title	Singers(s)	Length
1.	"O Tere Ki"	Vandan Vadhera	03:44
2.	"Christmas Day"	Thomas	04:46
3.	"Ishq Hai Khufiapanti"	Pawni Pandey	03:51
4.	"Jane Kyun"	Rahul Pandey	03:05
5.	"O Tere Ki"	Gwen	04:02
Total length:			18:48
