= Swati Kapoor =

Indian television actress

- Occupations: Actress; model
- Years active: 2010-present

Swati Kapoor is an Indian actress. She made her television debut as Rachana in the serial Kaali – Ek Agnipariksha. She made her debut in films with Punjabi film Mr & Mrs 420.

== Filmography ==
=== Films ===
Year	Title	Role	Language	Ref.
2014	Mr & Mrs 420	Rano	Punjabi	
2015	Mere Genie Uncle	Ria Bannerjee	Hindi	
2016	Fuddu	Shalini	Hindi	
2021	Tadap	Aanchal	Hindi	

=== Television ===
Year	Title	Role	Notes	Ref.
2010–2011	Kaali – Ek Agnipariksha	Rachana		
2011	Hamari Saass Leela	Anokhi Thakkar		
2015	Aahat	Kavita	Episode 69	
2015	Twist Wala Love - Fairytale Remixed	Ria		
2015	Stories by Rabindranath Tagore	Nilakshi	Episode: "Detective"	
2016	Mastaangi - One Love Story Two Lifetimes	ISI Agent Udita / Ria Sareen		
2016	Yeh Hai Mohabbatein	Sanchi		
2017	SuperCops vs Supervillains	Angel Dhara		
2017–2018	Tu Sooraj, Main Saanjh Piyaji	Saraswati Toshniwal		
2018	Chandrashekhar	Harleen Kaur	Guest appearance	
2018	Udaan	Naina Bedi		
2018	Kaleerein	Tulika		
2018–2019	Laal Ishq	Alisha / Suzanne / Amrita		
2019	Internet Wala Love	Ragini Sharma		
2019–2021	Kundali Bhagya	Mahira Khanna	Recurring role	
2023	Dhruv Tara – Samay Sadi Se Pare	Ayesha Malhotra		
