= Jahan Jaaeyega Hamen Paaeyega =

- Movie poster
- Directed by: Janmendra Ahuja
- Produced by: Lakhan Sinha
- Starring: Govinda; Sakshi Shivanand; Divya Dwivedi
- Music by: Aadesh Shrivastava
- Distributed by: T-Series
- Release date: 6 July 2007
- Running time: 139 minutes
- Country: India
- Language: Hindi

Jahan Jaaeyega Hamen Paaeyega (transl. Wherever you go, you will find us) is a 2007 Indian Hindi-language romantic thriller film directed by Janmendra Ahuja and produced by Dr Lakhan Sinhaa. The film stars Govinda, Sakshi Shivanand, Sharat Saxena, Kader Khan and Mukesh Rishi in the main casts. It was released on 6 July 2007 although it was filmed many years back.

== Synopsis ==
Karan (Govinda) loves Anju (Sakshi Sivanand), but when she gets murdered, Karan becomes the main accused and ends up in prison. Innocent, he breaks out of jail to find out the truth. He meets two young boys, Tito and Toni (Vinay Anand and Krishna Abhishek), who realize that Karan is a convict on the run and there is a huge prize on his head. Karan offers to help them get the money but wants them to help him trace Anju's murderers first. With their help, Karan learns that a group of people was involved in Anju's murder. He starts eliminating them one by one.

== Cast ==
- Govinda as Karan / Bobby Singh / Sher Khan
- Sakshi Shivanand as Anju V. Khanna
- Sharat Saxena as Master
- Mukesh Rishi as Inspector Rajat
- Kader Khan as Mr. Khanna
- Vinay Anand as Tito
- Krishna Abhishek as Tony
- Raju Srivastav as Mr. Khanna’s Servant

== Songs ==
1. "Na Chhoo Na" - Udit Narayan, Sunidhi Chauhan
2. "Banda Ye Janbaaz Hai" - Aadesh Shrivastava
3. "Deewana Mai Deewana" - Aadesh Shrivastava, Sneha Pant
4. "Sala Gaya Kam Se" - Aadesh Shrivastava

== Reception ==
=== Critical reception ===
Taran Adarsh gave the film 2 out of 5, writing, "Sinha's JAAHAN JAYEGA HAMEN PAAYEGA actually tests the patience of the viewer. Fine, you don't expect a riveting storyline from a film of this genre, but you definitely expect laughs, don't you? You expect to be entertained, don't you? Alas, what you get to see is definitely not good, not even bad, it's verrry boring!"
