= Vishwash Chauhan =

Indian actor (born 1995)

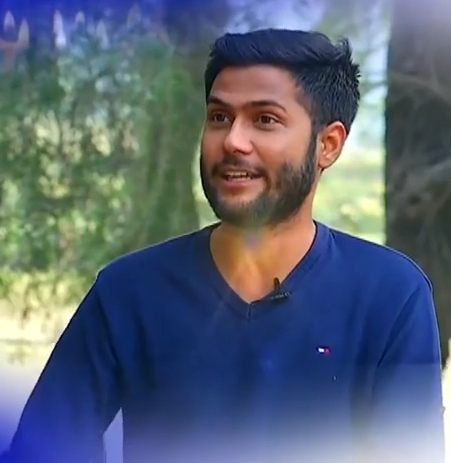
- Born: 13 January 1995 (age 31); Charkhi Dadri, Haryana, India
- Occupation: Comedian
- Years active: 2017 - Present

Vishwash Chauhan (born 13 January 1995) is an actor and stand-up comedian. He belongs to Charkhi Dadri, Haryana. Chauhan was the finalist for The Great Indian Laughter Challenge, 2017. He is also known as Kalu. His tagline is Maa ka Lal, Haryana ka Kalu!.

== Early and personal life ==
Vishwash was born to Mr Ranjit Singh in Charkhi Dadri, Haryana, India, on 13 January 1995. He attended Kurukshetra University.

== Career ==
Vishwash took part in various College Youth Festivals and National Level festivals during his college. But he rose to fame after his video in the comedy reality television show The Great Indian Laughter Challenge in 2017, got viral on the internet. Vishwash Chauhan, has also been honored at the National Youth Festival. Vishwash has left his mark on the national level where he has got a national award five time. He has been performing his art in the acting world for seven years. After achieving one success, Vishwash has illuminated the name of the area.
