= Guru (2003 film) =

- Directed by: Swapan Saha
- Written by: Snehasish Chakraborty
- Produced by: Nispal Singh
- Starring: Mithun Chakraborty; Jisshu U Sengupta; Rachna Banerjee; Tapas Paul; Kaushik Banerjee; Kharaj Mukherjee; Laboni Sarkar; Subhendu Chattopadhyay; Locket Chatterjee
- Cinematography: B. Satish
- Edited by: Suresh Urs
- Music by: Babul Bose
- Production company: Surinder Films
- Distributed by: Surinder Films
- Release date: 2003
- Running time: 135 minutes
- Country: India
- Language: Bengali

Guru (transl. Master) is a 2003 Indian Bengali-language gangster action film directed by Swapan Saha. Produced by Nispal Singh under the banner of Surinder Films, the film stars Mithun Chakraborty in the titular role, alongside an ensemble cast of Jisshu Sengupta, Rachna Banerjee, Kaushik Banerjee, Kharaj Mukherjee, Laboni Sarkar and Locket Chatterjee in another pivotal roles. It revolves around a non-violent man with a humble exterior, concealing his past identity of being a don.

Guru is remade twice in Bangladeshi as Sultan (2004) and Manik Badsha (2006), and in Hindi as Big Brother (2007).

== Plot ==
It revolves around a middle-class rickshaw driver of Kolkata named Raja, who always believes in non-violence and keeps himself away from any troubled situation. But all of a sudden, to save his family from a notorious criminal named Kedarnath, he has to reveal his true identity from the past, of a dreaded gangster named Guru. This was all the while hidden from his family as well as people of the area, to whom he was known to be a normal and frightened person.

== Cast ==
- Mithun Chakraborty as Raja/Guru
- Tapas Paul as Iqbal (cameo), Raja's best friend
- Jisshu Sengupta as Jeet, Police Officer
- Rachana Banerjee as Rinky
- Subhendu Chattopadhyay as Shyam Babu
- Kalyani Mondal
- Laboni Sarkar as OC Rina Roy
- Kaushik Banerjee as a corrupt politician and Don Kedar Nath, the leader of terrorism
- Locket Chatterjee as Mou
- Sandhita Chatterjee
- Dulal Lahiri as Rinky's father
- Sumit Ganguly
- Kharaj Mukherjee as Raja's assistant

== Soundtrack ==
All lyrics are written by Gautam Sushmit; all music is composed by Babul Bose.

No.	Title	Singer	Length
1.	"Bhadra Falgun Chaitra Ashar Sraban"	Vinod Rathod	4:18
2.	"Takei Bale Bhalobasa"	Sadhna Sargam, Babul Supriyo	5:03
3.	"Olite Golite Jane Galo Naam"	Shaan, Shreya Ghoshal	4:28
4.	"Ei Duniya Ajob Chiriyakhana"	Vinod Rathod	5:41
