= Aamdani Atthanni Kharcha Rupaiya =

2001 film by K. Raghavendra Rao

- Directed by: K. Raghavendra Rao
- Written by: Anwar Khan (dialogues)
- Story by: V. Sekhar
- Based on: Viralukketha Veekkam (Tamil) by V. Sekhar
- Produced by: G. Adiseshagiri Rao; G. V. Narasimha Rao
- Starring: Govinda; Juhi Chawla; Tabu; Johnny Lever; Chandrachur Singh; Vinay Anand; Isha Koppikar; Ketki Dave
- Cinematography: V. Srinivasa Reddy
- Edited by: Gautham Raju
- Music by: Songs: Himesh Reshammiya; Score: Shashi Preetam
- Distributed by: Padmalaya Telefilms Ltd; Shemaroo Video Pvt. Ltd.
- Release date: 21 December 2001
- Running time: 160 minutes
- Country: India
- Language: Hindi

Aamdani Atthanni Kharcha Rupaiya (lit. 'Income is 50 paise and expenses are a whole rupee'; cont. Expenses are greater than wages) sometimes abbreviated as AAKR is a 2001 Indian Hindi-language comedy film directed by K. Raghavendra Rao starring Govinda, Juhi Chawla, Tabu, Chandrachur Singh and Johnny Lever. This was the remake of the Tamil film Viralukketha Veekkam, directed by V. Sekhar. The film was an above-average grosser at the box office.

== Plot ==
Jhumri and her husband, Bhishma, move into a new neighborhood. Their neighbors are three bickering couples: Vijay and Anjali who are newly married; Appu Khote and Vimla, who are married and have four children; and Ravi and Meena, who are married and have a daughter. Slowly the husbands are running out of money so they trick their wives and go to Hyderabad to get some money from Appu's friend. Meanwhile, their wives are struggling to pay their rent and decide to work even though their husbands told them not to. When the husbands come back, they kick their wives out of the house since they got jobs. The wives go to live with Jhumri and Bhishma.

The husbands are struggling to cook and take care of their children and go out to bring a dance-bar girl home to cook and look after the children! One day, Meena and Ravi's daughter, Rani, is diagnosed with a heart problem and needs to be operated on quickly. Both husband and wife try to get two lakh rupees to save her life. The wives earn the amount by working hard, while Ravi tries smuggling drugs to get the money. The three men are then caught by the police, arrested and beaten by the police. Bhishma helps them by finding the real owner of the smuggling commotion and freeing the men. The husbands realize their mistake and apologize to their wives. The husbands and the wives decide to work together for a better life. The story has a happy ending with the families living happily together.

== Cast ==
- Govinda as Bhishma
- Juhi Chawla as Jhumri
- Tabu as Meena
- Chandrachur Singh as Ravi
- Johnny Lever as Appu Khote
- Vinay Anand as Vijay
- Isha Koppikar as Anjali (Hindi voice dubbed by Mona Ghosh Shetty)
- Ketki Dave as Vimla
- Mink Brar as Sukeshini (dancer)
- Shakti Kapoor as Dhokla Bhai
- Asrani as Jhumri's boss
- Ranjeet as Boss of Motor Company
- Tiku Talsania as B.K. Kakkad (landlord)
- Raju Srivastava as Baba Chin Chin Choo
- Razzak Khan as taxi driver
- Sayaji Shinde as Bijnora
- Viju Khote
- Jaya Prakash Reddy as Police Inspector
- Mahesh Thakur

== Soundtrack ==
Aamdani Atthanni Kharcha Rupaiya

Soundtrack album by Himesh Reshammiya
- Released: 4 October 2001 (India)
- Recorded: 2001
- Venue: Mumbai
- Genre: Feature film soundtrack
- Label: Universal Music India
- Producer: Himesh Reshammiya

Himesh Reshammiya chronology
Jodi No. 1 (2001)	Aamdani Atthanni Kharcha Rupaiya (2001)	Kyaa Dil Ne Kaha (2002)

All lyrics are written by Sudhakar Sharma; all music is composed by Himesh Reshammiya.

Songs
No.	Title	Playback	Length
1.	"Aamdani Atthani Kharcha Rupaiyaa"	Udit Narayan, Shaan, Johnny Lever
2.	"Aayee Hai Diwali"	Udit Narayan, Alka Yagnik, Kumar Sanu, Shaan, Ketki Dave, Sneha Pant
3.	"Chori Chori Tera Chalna"	Udit Narayan, Alka Yagnik
4.	"Sajanniya Re"	Babul Supriyo, Sunidhi Chauhan
5.	"Style Nasha Tera"	Udit Narayan, Babul Supriyo, Sunidhi Chauhan
6.	"Ta Thaiya Ta Thaiya"	Shaan, Sunidhi Chauhan, Pinky

== Reception ==
Bollywood Hungama wrote "On the whole, Aamdani Atthanni Kharcha Rupaiya is an ordinary fare with average prospects". Rediff wrote "director Raghavendra Rao wanted to drive a social message across but he seems to have confused the genres. He changes track from comedy to hysteria in the blink of an eyelid. And you are left pretty clueless". The Hindu wrote ""Aamdani....", like many other Padmalaya ventures, is directed by K. Raghavendra Rao. After seeing his latest venture here, how one wishes K. Raghavendra Rao, had saved us the spectacle of an outrageously retrograde film. In his endeavour to raise a few good laughs about middle-class couples facing an increasingly uphill struggle to make ends meet, he exposes us all to ridicule."
