= Rauf Lala =

Pakistani comedian and actor

Rauf Lala رؤف لالہ
- Born: Abdul Rauf Lala; 1970 (age 55–56); Larkana, Sindh, Pakistan
- Other name: Comedy Ka Shahenshah
- Occupations: Stand-up Comedian, Actor, Anchor, Writer, Director
- Years active: 1985–present

Rauf Lala (Urdu: رؤف لالہ; born 1970) is a Pakistani comedian, actor, writer, and producer. Working in Pakistani media for over three decades, he is known for his comedic talent and stage work. Lala has also worked in India, winning season two of The Great Indian Laughter Challenge. He participated in Pakistan's reality TV show Tamasha Season 1 and emerged as one of the 4 finalists in the show.

== Career ==
Rauf Lala began his stage career in 1985, as a comedian in One Day Theater, Karachi, alongside his teacher, Razak Rajo. His first commercial show was Susral Bara Janjaal also in 1985, which featured Umer Sharif and Javed Sheikh.

He has collaborated with Umer Sharif and Moin Akhtar on many stage shows, including Bhudda Ghar Per Hai, and in 1989, Bakra Qistoon Pay, which remains a popular and well-known Pakistani stage show internationally. Lala has appeared on several comedy reality shows, gaining popularity on television, as well as appearing in movies in Pakistan and India.

In 2006, he was invited to appear in season two of The Great Indian Laughter Challenge, an Indian reality television show on channel Star One, which he won. He was awarded the title "Comedy Ka Shahenshah" ("emperor of comedy"), becoming the first Pakistani to win the major Indian contest. He appeared alongside actress Bipasha Basu in the final episode.

=== Filmography ===
| Year | Title | Role | Place |
|---|---|---|---|
| 1983 | Manila K Jaanbaz | Supporting Role | Lollywood |
| 1990 | Hum Toh Chale Susraal | Guy From America | Lollywood |
| 1993 | Duniya Dil Walo Ki | Saud's Friend | Lollywood |
| 2009 | Runway | Tulip Joshi's Friend | Bollywood |
| 2010 | Bhavnao Ko Samjho | Film Director | Bollywood |

=== Television ===
Lala has worked in various serials, commercials and television films, including:

- Ek Raat Ek Kahani
- Funny Family
- Super Karara
- Comedy Kings
- Comedy Champions
- The Great Indian Family Drama

=== Shows ===
| Year | Title | Role | Notes |
|---|---|---|---|
| 2020 | Khush Raho Pakistan 2020 Cup | Captain (Team Balochistan) | Runner Up |
| 2020 | Khush Raho Pakistan 2020 Cup (Season 2) | Captain (Team Balochistan) | Runner Up |
| 2020 | Tick Tock Show with Rauf Lala | | |
| 2022 | Tamasha | | |

== See also ==
- List of Lollywood actors
