= Censor (2001 film) =

2001 film by Dev Anand

- Directed by: Dev Anand
- Written by: Dev Anand
- Produced by: Dev Anand
- Starring: Dev Anand; Jackie Shroff; Hema Malini; Mamta Kulkarni; Shammi Kapoor
- Cinematography: Adeep Tandon
- Edited by: Ashok Bandekar
- Music by: Jatin–Lalit
- Release date: 6 April 2001
- Running time: 170 minutes
- Country: India
- Language: Hindi

Censor is a 2001 Indian Hindi-language legal drama film, directed and produced by Dev Anand. It stars himself, Hema Malini, Jackie Shroff, Shammi Kapoor and Rekha. The film satirises film censorship in India. It was the first and only film to star veteran actors Dev Anand and Shammi Kapoor together onscreen.

== Plot ==
Bollywood producer Vikramjeet faces heavy censorship on his film Aane Wala Kal after appealing directly to an unsympathetic Minister of Information and Broadcasting. Defying the Censor Board, he gathers written endorsements from a private screening audience and secretly smuggles a copy to the US through his friend Margaret Truman, securing an Oscars nomination. Consequently, the Board denies him a 'U' certificate, and he is arrested for illegally exporting the film without Reserve Bank of India clearance.

Taking the battle to court, Vikramjeet defends his cinematic vision by exposing the personal hypocrisy of critical board members, while mobilizing widespread public and industry support. The court ultimately acquits him, ordering his box-office earnings to be donated to charity and cementing his victory against censorship and wins the Academy Award for his film in the US.

== Cast ==
- Dev Anand as Vikramjeet "Vicky" Kumar
- Jackie Shroff as Naseeruddin Shaukh
- Hema Malini as Radha Kumar
- Rekha as Ms. Shrivastav
- Mamta Kulkarni as Nisha
- Ayesha Jhulka as Shakeela Banu
- Johnny Lever as Johny
- Shammi Kapoor as Judge
- Raj Babbar as Ajay V. Kumar
- Aruna Irani as Nandini
- Amrish Puri as Pandit Shiv Prasad
- Vinay Anand as Hero
- Govinda as Raj Devgan(special appearance in song "Hum Jo Rang Mein Aa Gaye")
- Archana Puran Singh as Margaret Truman (Maggie)
- Shivaji Satam as the head of I&B
- Pinky Campbell as Mohini Shiv Prasad

== Soundtrack ==
Lyrics by Vinod Mahendra and Gopaldas Neeraj.

Song	Singer
"Yaaron Jo Kal Tak Thay Hum Tum"	Kumar Sanu, Udit Narayan, Alka Yagnik, Jaspinder Narula
"Is Tarah Dekho Na Humko"	Udit Narayan, Alka Yagnik
"Hum Jo Rang Mein Aa Gaye"	Kumar Sanu
"Sun Meri Gal"	Kumar Sanu, Jaspinder Narula
"Ho Aaj Majhab Koi"	Roop Kumar Rathod, Vijeta Pandit, Kavita Krishnamurthy and Vinod Rathod
"Mere Dil Mein Tu Nazar Mein Tu"	Lata Mangeshkar
"Aaya Samay"	Vinod Rathod, Jaspinder Narula
