= Sautela =

- Promotional Poster
- Directed by: T. Rama Rao
- Written by: Santhosh Suraj
- Story by: Erode Sounder
- Based on: Cheran Pandiyan by Erode Sounder
- Produced by: Dharmanand Joshi
- Starring: Mithun Chakraborty; Suresh Oberoi; Gulshan Grover; Rami Reddy; Reema Lagoo
- Cinematography: D. Prasadbabu
- Edited by: Shyam Mukherji
- Music by: Tabun Sutradhar
- Production company: Trishakti Films
- Release date: 12 November 1999
- Language: Hindi

Sautela is a 1999 Indian Hindi-language action drama film directed by T. Rama Rao, starring Mithun Chakraborty in the lead role. The film, a remake of Tamil-language film Cheran Pandiyan also introduced 3 South Indian Heroines, Priya Raman, Priyanka Upendra and Rajashree to Bollywood.

== Plot ==
Raghuvir, the head of the village Panchayat, and Arjun are step-brothers who live separately. Arjun always respects his elder brother Raghuvir. Raguvir's wife and daughter also love Arjun, but Raghuvir openly dislikes him for being a step-brother. One day local goons try to rape Raghuvir's daughter and Arjun beats them up and rescues her. Without knowing the fact, Raghuvir punished Arjun. The enemies of the family including the local don use this hatred to their advantage.

== Cast ==
- Mithun Chakraborty as Arjun
- Suresh Oberoi as Raghuvir
- Priyanka Upendra as Raghuvir's daughter
- Priya Raman
- Vinay Anand
- Gulshan Grover
- Rami Reddy
- Reema Lagoo as Raghuvir's wife
- Vishwajeet Pradhan
- Rajashree
- Rohini Hattangadi

== Music ==
1. "Dil Hai Deewana Mera" - Anuradha Paudwal, Abhijeet
2. "Behna Ri Pyari Pyari" - Kavita Krishnamurthy, Kumar Sanu
3. "Sapno Ki Rani Hai Deewani" - Anuradha Paudwal, Abhijeet
4. "Haule Haule Pyar Karo Na" - Kumar Sanu, Anuradha Paudwal
5. "Na Honge Hum Juda" - Kavita Krishnamurthy, Kumar Sanu
6. "Kismat Ne Dekho" - Indrajit Dasgupta
