= Navin Prabhakar =

Indian actor, comedian, singer

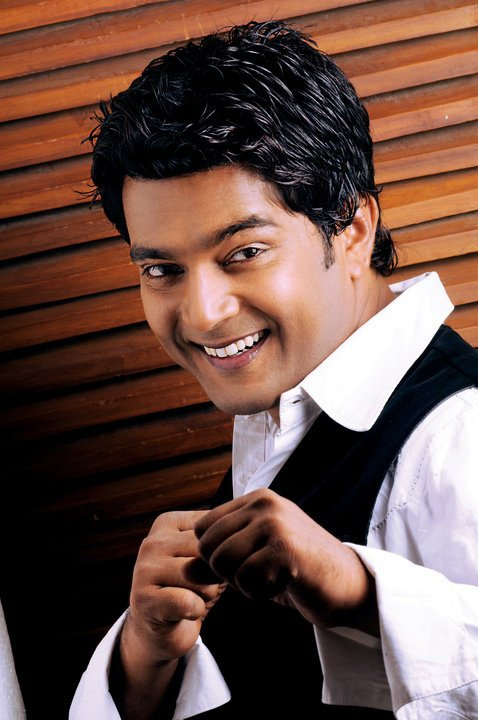
- Navin Prabhakar
- Occupations: comedian; corporate stand-up comedian; singer; actor; mimicry artist
- Years active: 1995–present
- Website: navinprabhakar.com

Navin Prabhakar is an Indian comedian, singer, actor and a mimicry artist. He is most known for his Pehchaan Kaun (Mumbai bar girl) act on The Great Indian Laughter Challenge (2005). Subsequently, he hosted a mimicry and stand-up show Hello Kaun? Pehchaan Kaun (2008–2009).

== Career ==
Navin, a commerce graduate from Mumbai University, began his career as a singer, then actor, then began experimenting with making people laugh. After getting a good response in comedy deliveries, Navin decided to test himself at a national platform through the famous comedy show The Great Indian Laughter Challenge in 2005 which quickly made a name for himself with his trade-mark expression "Pehchaan Kon" of "Julie – the bar girl". After this, he worked on new ventures as a singer, actor, host, stand-up and mimicry artist.

== Gujarati corporate comedians ==
He started trend as working as a corporate comedian. His shows include 2hrs live laughter, where he does his trademark "Pehchaan Kon" act. He is regarded as one of the top Indian corporate comedians.

Prabhakar has given voiceover in films including Mohabbat Ho Gayi Hai Tumse, Maine Dil Tujhko Diya, Nehle Pe Dehla, Champion and Ara Ara Aaba, Aata Tari Thamba. He did the voiceover for the song "Dhagala lagli kala". He has also sung in Adnan Sami's song "Lift Karade" (Remix) as a voiceover artist. Albums that were further released were Chor Chor, Spicy Mango, Jalwa Part II, Saangu and Naka.

== Filmography ==
Films

Year	Film	Role	Notes
2007	No Problem	Jay	Marathi film
2007	Bombay to Goa		
2008	Aftermath	Ayush Khanna	
2010	Bhavnao Ko Samjho	Shekhar	
2010	Vroom	Girgit	
2012	Tere Naal Love Ho Gaya	Mr. Naidu	
2012	Khiladi 786	Raj	
2013	Premacha Jhol Jhal	Pankaj	Marathi film
2013	Phata Poster Nikhla Hero	Gopi	
2014	Samrat & Co.	Hari	
2015	Killing Veerappan	Rajan	
2016	Veerappan		
2016	7 Hours to Go		
2017	Manomani		Marathi Short Film
2020	Darbar		
2020	Official Bhootiyagiri 3		
2021	Say Tu		Marathi Short Series
2022	Aapdi Thapdi	Antagonist	Upcoming Marathi film
2024	Raghuveer	Savji	Marathi Film

Television

Year	Serial	Role	Notes
2005	The Great Indian Laughter Challenge	Contestant	Finalist
2006	Takeshi's Castle	Narrator	Hindi dubbed version
2008	Boogie Woogie	Guest Judge	
2008–2009	Laughter Knights	Himself	
2008–2009	Hello Kaun? Pehchaan Kaun	Host	
2012	Crime Patrol	Arjun Kangi	episodes 166 – 167
2017	Bhabi Ji Ghar Par Hai!	Pramod & Zalil Choudhary	
2017	The Great Indian Laughter Challenge 5	Guest	
2022	Laal Ishq	Subodh Chaterjee	
