= Sumedha Karmahe =

Indian vocalist and performing artist

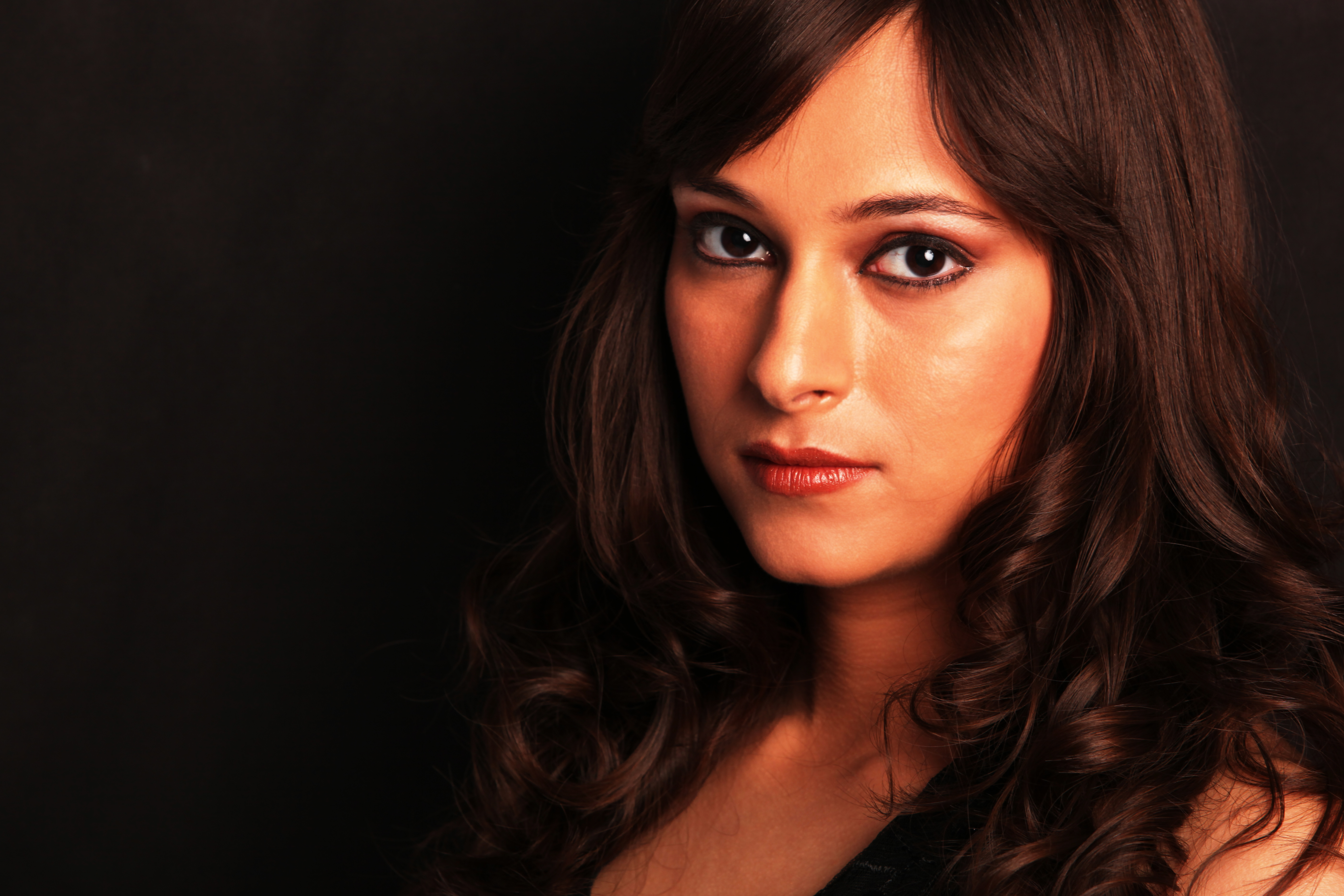
Sumedha Karmahe

Sumedha Karmahe is an Indian vocalist and performing artist. She has performed in different television shows like Sa Re Ga Ma Pa Challenge 2007, Ek Se Badhkar Ek, Dulhan, Maayeka, Ranbir Rano, Saregamapa 2009, Saregamapa Mega Challenge on Zee TV, IPL Rockstars on Colors, and The Jam Room on Sony Mix. Her first released playback was in a Santosh Sivan film named Tahaan. She has done playbacks in 5 different languages. Till date she has 3 singles - Bawre Nain, Yaadein, Darmiyaan to her credit. Recently, she has given her voice for songs like Toota Jo kabhi Taara along with Atif Aslam for the movie A Flying Jatt, Tum Tum Tum Ho along with Arijit Singh for the movie Fuddu. Her latest hit is Nazm Nazm from the album Bareilly Ki Barfi. She is from Rajnandgaon, Chhattisgarh.

== Hindi single song discography ==
Year	Songs	Co-singer(s)	Movie/Album
2007	Teeno Lok Me Pooja Jaye	Asha Bhosle, Mauli Dave, Rishi, Junaid Sheikh	Bal Ganesh
2008	Hathi Re Shokti		Bal Ganesh Bengali
2008	Aili Nanadiya Hamaar		Laxmi Aisan Dulhin Hamaar
2008	Kehva Ke Sugna	Suresh Wadkar	Laxmi Aisan Dulhin Hamaar
2008	Chakhri (Modern)		Tahaan
2009	Dil Bhi Tu Hai	Zubeen Garg	Phir Bihu Aaye Jhoom Ke
2009	Tere Bin	Raja Hasan, Bappi Lahiri	Teree Sang
2011	Main Ho Radha Main		Mahtari
2011	Saiyaan Jo Dil La		Mahtari
2013	Bawre Nain		Hindi Video Song
2013	Yaadein		Hindi Video Song
2014	Ruthana Hai Agar Meri Jaane Jigar	Javed Ali	Guardians (Original Motion Picture Soundtrack)
2014	Ek Chand Badalon Mein	Udit Narayan	Guardians (Original Motion Picture Soundtrack)
2016	Toota Jo Kabhi Tara	Atif Aslam	A Flying Jatt
2016	Toota Jo Kabhi Taara - Female Version		A Flying Jatt
2016	Jaane Jaan Dhoondta	Abhijeet Sawant	The Unwind Mix
2016	Tum Tum Tum Ho Punjabi Version	Arijit Singh, Yasser Desai	Fuddu
2016	Aa Seetha Devainaa	Shriya	Krishnagadi Veera Prema Gaadha
2017	Nazm Nazm (Female Version)		Bareilly Ki Barfi
2017	Aap Jaisa Koi		Bollywood Retro Love
2017	Har Kisiko Nahin Milta		The Unwind Mix
2017	Dopahriyaan	Salman Shaikh	Zee Music Company
2017	Darmiyaan	Yasser Desai	Hindi Video Song
2017	Saahilon Pe		Rain
2018	Raasleela		3 Storeys
2018	Happy Ending Song	Taaruk Raina	High Jack
2025	Backing vocals	Aanandi Joshi, Aasa Singh, Sudeep Jaipurwale, Sana Aziz, Nakul Abhyankar, Sarthak Kalyani	Chhaava
