= Mazaak Mazaak Mein =

- Genre: Talent show Television comedy
- Created by: Ekta Kapoor; Shobha Kapoor
- Written by: Ekta Kapoor; Shobha Kapoor
- Presented by: Karishma Kotak replaced by Shraddha Aarya
- Starring: See below
- Country of origin: India
- Original language: Hindi
- No. of seasons: 1
- No. of episodes: 20

Production
- Producers: Ekta Kapoor; Shobha Kapoor
- Production locations: Mumbai, India
- Camera setup: Multi-camera
- Production company: Balaji Telefilms

Original release
- Network: Life OK
- Release: 23 July – 25 September 2016

Mazaak Mazaak Mein is an Indian Hindi-language reality television talent competition, which premiered on 23 July 2016 on Life OK. The series is produced by Balaji Telefilms of Ekta Kapoor and Shobha Kapoor.

Harbhajan Singh and Shoaib Akhtar were the judges.

== Plot ==
The show is a reality show, but the main aim of the show is to select the best comedians in the field of comedy.

== Judges ==
- Shoaib Akhtar
- Harbhajan Singh

== Cast ==
- Chandan Prabhakar
- Raju Srivastava
- Suresh Albela
- Vrajesh Hirjee
- Zafri Khan
