= Comedy Ka Maha Muqabala =

Indian sitcom series

- Country of origin: India
- Original language: Hindi

Production
- Running time: approximately 45 minutes

Original release
- Network: Star Plus
- Release: 19 March – 11 June 2011

Comedy Ka Maha Muqabala is a comedy reality show that aired on Star Plus. Four teams including some of the biggest names from films and television competed, and the show was hosted by Jennifer Winget. Comedy Ka Maha Muqabala was launched on 19 March 2011 and was produced by Reliance BIG Entertainment. The show ended on 11 June 2011 after a grand finale episode. The winners were, Shreyas Chi Mandli group.

== Plot ==
Each week, four teams competed against each other in a comedy competition. The teams were captained by four Indian comedy celebrities—Arshad Warsi, Raveena Tandon, Shekhar Suman and Shreyas Talpade—who performed with a team of television celebrities, stand-up comedians and one comedy beginner in a variety of challenges. A total of 20 contestants competed. Based on their performances, teams were scored by the audience and other team captains. The team with the highest scores at the end of the week won the "Comedy Ka.

== Teams ==
Teams	Arshad Ke Punters	Raveena ke Mohre	Shekhar Ke Movers	Shreyas Chi Mandli
Captains	Arshad Warsi	Raveena Tandon	Shekhar Suman	Shreyas Talpade
Members	Rehmaan Khan	Sudesh Bhosle	Shailesh Lodha	Raju Srivastav
Members	Rashami Desai	Aashka Goradia / Sucheta Khanna	Supriya Pilgaonkar	Rajesh Kumar
Members	Sunil Grover	Parul Yadav	Nikhil Ratnaparkhi	Balraj Syal
Members	Saahil Khattar	Vibha Bhagat	Istiyak Khan	Roshni Chopra
Status	Runner-Up	Eliminated	Eliminated	Winner

Over the course of the competition, Sudesh Bhosle replaced Sudesh Lehri, Sucheta Khanna replaced Aashka Goradia and Rajesh Kumar replaced Arhaan Behl.

== Format ==
Each week included two or more rounds. The stand-up round, included in early episodes, featured one member of each team performing a stand-up routine, and was worth 20 points. The team round featured two or more team members performing together, also worth twenty points. A challenge round introduced in later episodes also featured two or more team members performing together, with the best performance earning ten bonus points. The Tug of War (ToW) round, featured in later episodes, included one member from each team performing together on a skit, with the top individual performer receiving five points for the team.

For the stand-up and team rounds, each team could earn up to 10 points from the audience and up to 10 more points from the three non-performing captains.

== Weekly scores ==
LEGEND

Highest Scoring Team
Lowest Scoring Team

=== Week 1 ===
Team	Stand-Up By:	Stand-Up Score	Team Score	Total
Arshad Ke Punters	Rehmaan Khan	33	39	72
Raveena Ke Mohre	Sudesh Lehri	34	35	69
Shreyas Chi Mandli	Raju Shrivastav	40	28	68
Shekhar Ke Movers	Shailesh Lodha	27	31	58

In the first week of competition, each round was worth a maximum of 40 points. Raju Shrivastav received a perfect score of 40.

=== Week 2 ===
Team	Stand-Up By:	Stand-Up Score	Team Score	Challenge Score	Week 2 Total	Total
Shreyas Chi Mandli	Raju Shrivastav	16	15	10	41	109
Arshad Ke Punters	Rehmaan Khan	16	18	0	34	106
Raveena Ke Mohre	Sudesh Lehri	17	14	0	31	100
Shekhar Ke Movers	Shailesh Lodha	19	18	0	37	95

In the second week, both rounds were reduced to 20 points.

=== Week 3 ===
Team	Stand-Up By:	Stand-Up Score	Team Score	Bonus Points	Week 3 Total	Total
Shreyas Chi Mandli	Raju Shrivastav	20	18	5	43	152
Shekhar Ke Movers	Shailesh Lodha	20	17	0	37	132
Arshad Ke Punters	Rehmaan Khan	0	18	5	23	129
Raveena Ke Mohre	Sudesh Bhosle	0	16	0	16	116

Sudesh Bhosle replaced Sudesh Lehri from Raveena Ke Mohre in the third week. Due to the airing of the Star Parivaar Awards 2011 no episode was telecast on 3 April 2011. The format was changed this week to account for the single episode. In the team round, the top-scoring team could earn 10 additional bonus points. Arshad and Shreyas teams tied, so each received 5 bonus points. In the stand-up round, a duel was set up where two individuals would go head to head, performing on a theme, with the winner receiving all 20 points. The line-ups were Rehman vs Shailesh and Raju vs Sudesh.

=== Week 4 ===
Team	Stand-Up By:	Stand-Up Score	Team Score	Challenge Score	Week 4 Total	Total
Shreyas Chi Mandli	Raju Shrivastav	20	17	0	37	189
Arshad Ke Punters	Sunil Grover	18	20	10	48	177
Shekhar Ke Movers	Shailesh Lodha	17	18	0	35	167
Raveena Ke Mohre	Sudesh Bhosle	16	20	0	35	152

Sucheta Khanna replaced Aashka Goradia from Raveena Ke Mohre in the fourth week. Arshad Ke Punters scored the most points, but Shreyas Chi Mandli finished the week with the highest cumulative score of 189.

=== Week 5 ===
Team	Team Score	Challenge Score	Week 5 Total	Total
Arshad Ke Punters	18	10	28	205
Shreyas Chi Mandli	15	0	15	204
Shekhar Ke Movers	17	0	17	184
Raveena Ke Mohre	16	0	16	168

Rajesh Kumar replaced Arhaan Behl from Shreyas Chi Mandli in week five. The stand-up round was incomplete this week and thus was not included in the scoring.

=== Week 6 ===
Team	Team Score	Challenge Score	Week 6 Total	Total
Arshad Ke Punters	17	10	27	232
Shreyas Chi Mandli	17	0	17	221
Shekhar Ke Movers	17	0	17	201
Raveena Ke Mohre	17	0	17	185

=== Week 7 ===
Team	Team Score	Challenge Score	Week 7 Total	Total
Arshad Ke Punters	16	0	16	248
Shreyas Chi Mandli	16	0	16	237
Shekhar Ke Movers	18	10	28	229
Raveena Ke Mohre	18	0	18	203

Nikhil Ratnaparkhi won the "Best performer of the week" award in week seven.

=== Week 8 ===
Team	Team Score	Challenge Score	Week 8 Total	Total
Arshad Ke Punters	19	50	69	317
Shreyas Chi Mandli	18	0	18	255
Shekhar Ke Movers	16	0	16	245
Raveena Ke Mohre	16	0	16	219

In the eighth week, the challenge round was worth 50 points rather than 10, and Raveena Ke Mohre were eliminated.

=== Week 9 ===
Team	ToW By:	ToW Score	Team Score	Challenge Score	Week 9 Total
Shreyas Chi Mandli	Rajesh Kumar	5	15	0	20
Arshad Ke Punters	Sunil Grover	0	17	0	17
Shekhar Ke Movers	Nikhil Ratnaparkhi	0	17	10	27

The ninth week was the first for the Tug of War (ToW) round, deciding the performer of the week and giving the winning team an opportunity to earn an additional five bonus points. Cumulative point totals were also reset this week.

=== Week 10 ===
Team	ToW By(Male):	ToW Score	ToW By(Female):	ToW Score	Team Score	Challenge Score	Week 10 Total	Total
Shreyas Chi Mandli	Raju Shrivastav	5	Roshni Chopra	0	16	0	21	41
Arshad Ke Punters	Rehmaan Khan	0	Rashmi Desai	5	18	10	33	50
Shekhar Ke Movers	Nikhil Ratnaparkhi	0	Supriya Pilgaonkar	0	14	0	14	41

The Tug of War (ToW) round was conducted twice in the tenth week, once for women and once for men.

=== Week 11/12 - Semi Final ===
Team	Match 1	Match 2	Match 3	Match 4	Match 5	Match 6	Week 11/12 Total	Total
Shreyas Chi Mandli	Not Competing		0	10	10	10	30	71
Arshad Ke Punters	0	10	10	0	Not Competing		20	70
Shekhar Ke Movers	10	0	Not Competing		0	0	10	51

In the semi-final, Shekhar Ke Movers and Arshad Ke Punters first competed in two rounds. Arshad Ke Punters then competed against Shreyas Chi Mandli and won a place in the finals. Shreyas Chi Mandli finally battled Shekhar Ke Movers in two more elimination rounds, and Shekhar Ke Movers was eliminated.

=== Week 13 - Grand Finale ===
Team	Match 1	Match 2	Week 13 Total	Total
Shreyas Chi Mandli	20	16	36	107
Arshad Ke Punters	16	18	34	104

After two team rounds, Shreyas Chi Mandli won the competition.

== Scores Summary ==
Team	Week 1	Week 2	Week 3	Week 4	Week 5	Week 6	Week 7	Week 8	Points reset	Week 9	Week 10	Week 11/12	Week 13	Status
Shreyas Chi Mandli	68	109	152	189	204	221	237	255	Points reset	20	41	71	107	WINNER
Arshad Ke Punters	72	106	129	177	205	232	248	317	Points reset	17	50	70	104	RUNNER-UP
Shekhar Ke Movers	58	95	132	167	184	201	229	245	Points reset	27	41	51	Eliminated	
Raveena Ke Mohre	69	100	116	152	168	185	203	219	Points reset	Eliminated				

Winner of the Week(Sartaj)
Team Eliminated

Scores shown in the above table are based on the total tally from week 1 until end of that week.
