= Dil Ne Phir Yaad Kiya (2001 film) =

2001 film by Rajat Rawail

- Directed by: Rajat Rawail
- Screenplay by: Sandeep Bhowmick; Raju Saigal; S. M. Ahale
- Dialogues by: Javed Siddiqui; Bholu Khan; Aman Jaffery
- Produced by: Mansoor Ahmed Siddiqui
- Starring: Govinda; Tabu; Pooja Batra; Vinay Anand
- Cinematography: H. Laxminarayan
- Edited by: Bharat Singh
- Music by: Aadesh Shrivastava; Uttam Singh
- Production company: ANAS Films
- Release date: 7 September 2001
- Country: India
- Language: Hindi

Dil Ne Phir Yaad Kiya (transl. The Heart is Rembering Once Again ) is a 2001 Indian Hindi-language musical romance film directed by Rajat Rawail. It stars Vinay Anand, Pooja Batra, Govinda and Tabu.

== Plot ==
Rahul Khanna and Sonia Chopra are in love, they seek the blessings of their elders, Mahendra Pratap Khanna, Mr. Chopra and Mrs. Chopra, and get married. During their honeymoon, Sonia, who is very ambitious, tells Rahul that he should start his own business, away from his father, and stand on his own feet. Rahul does so, and starts a modelling agency. His immediate rival is Sanjeev Verma, who is very successful. In order to compete with him, Rahul must sign up leading model, Roshni Batra. In order to do so, he meets with Roshni. Roshni, who has lost her lover, Prem, accepts Rahul as Prem who has been returned to her, and agrees to work with his agency. Then Roshni starts behaving like Rahul is really Prem, and she will not let anyone come between her and her lost love.

== Cast ==
- Govinda as Prem
- Tabu as Roshni Batra
- Pooja Batra as Sonia Chopra / Khanna
- Vinay Anand as Rahul Khanna
- Faraaz Khan as Sanjeev Verma
- Sadashiv Amrapurkar as Shri Chopra, Sonia's father
- Kunickaa Sadanand as Smta. Chopra, Sonia's mother
- Kiran Kumar as Mahendra Pratap Khanna, Rahul's father
- Guddi Maruti as Komal Singh
- Tiku Talsania as Bobby Singh, Komal's husband
- Dinesh Hingoo as Trideep Nandan
- Vrajesh Hirjee as Charlie

== Music ==
The music was composed by Aadesh Shrivasatava and Uttam Singh, with lyrics written by Sameer.

1. "Dil Ne Phir Yaad Kiya" - Alka Yagnik, Sonu Nigam
2. "Duptta Sambhal Ke" - Kavita Krishnamurthy, Vinod Rathod
3. "Ye Mausam" - Kumar Sanu, Alka Yagnik
4. "Aaj Nachna" - Udit Narayan, Alka Yagnik
5. "Sare Shahar Me" - Lata Mangeshkar, Udit Narayan
6. "Chali Chali Re Gori" - Vinod Rathod, Alka Yagnik
7. "Kab Tak Yu Dil" - Udit Narayan, Alka Yagnik
