= Bhola in Bollywood =

Hindi film

Bhola In Bollywood is a Hindi comedy-drama film directed and produced by Sumbul Gazi. This film was released on 15 October 2004 under the banner of the Pedhiwala Entertainer. The film was a box office failure.

== Plot ==
Bhola Prasad is a simple and honest young man who lives in a village in Bihar. One day he goes to his maternal uncle in Mumbai for a better future. Upon arrival in the city, all his belongings are stolen; he becomes helpless but finds his uncle finally. He realises that his uncle is also in a needy situation, searching for a job. Bhola decides to enter Bollywood to become a film hero. After a few days, Bhola and his uncle learn that it is not an easy task to be a hero in the Bollywood film industry. He meets Raveena, a young lady from America who aspires to become a Bollywood star. The film ends when they become stars for the same movie after a failed romance.

== Cast ==
- Raj Babbar as Himself
- Shammi Kapoor
- Vinod Khanna
- Raza Murad as Instructor
- Siraj Mustafa Khan as Bhola Prasad
- Razak Khan as Photographer
- Virendra Saxena as Bhola's uncle
- Bharati Sharma as Raveena
- Imran Khan
- Suresh Chatwal
- Avtar Gill as Mohan, Producer
- Alok Nath as Mehra
- Ali Asgar
- Rajesh Puri
- Ajit Vachani
