= Laughter Knights =

- Promotional image
- Country of origin: India
- Original language: Hindi

Production
- Running time: 24 minutes

Original release
- Network: STAR One
- Release: 12 December 2008 – 6 March 2009

Related
- The Great Indian Laughter Challenge

Laughter Knights is an Indian reality competition television series. It is a spin-off of The Great Indian Laughter Challenge. In this series all the finalists from the last four seasons compete against each other. The show aired on STAR One from 12 December 2008 to 6 March 2009. The series was produced by Endemol India.

== Plot ==
In an attempt to give the audience more laughter in the most authentic way, there would be pleasant variations, unlike The Great Indian Laughter Challenge (TGILC).

The participants of Laughter Knights will be the finalists of TGILC I - IV. The familiar faces, Siddhu and Mandira Bedi will grace the show with their never ending laughter and one of their kind comments.

With the traditional stand up comedy, there will be a Laughter Panchayat, where the funniest of the cases will be discussed and a judgement will be passed by none other than the knights of laughter.

Besides that, there will be exclusive, unique, never done before celebrity interviews. The Laughter Knights will interview and interact with the 'cut - outs' of famous celebrities of the television and film industry. It will be an INTERESTING interaction between the Knights & with the celebs' cut out, the questions and the discussions will leave the audience in splits of laughter.

Another new addition of Laughter Knights will be its interactive audience where the Knights' will take digs at the familiar faces in the audience & the rest of the Knights who will be there throughout the 13 episodes of the show. The feel will be a more familiar setting and a frequently interacted with audience.
