= Ahsaan Qureshi =

Indian stand-up comedian

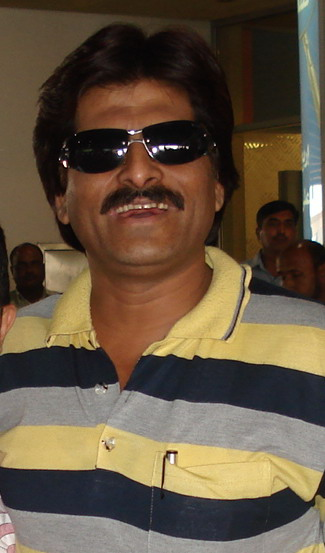
- Qureshi during a visit to Kuwait
- Born: Seoni, Madhya Pradesh, India
- Occupations: Comedian, Actor
- Years active: 1995 - Present
- Known for: The Great Indian Laughter Challenge

Ahsaan Qureshi, also known as Ehsaan Qureshi, is an Indian stand-up comedian. He was born in Seoni, Madhya Pradesh. He is the 2005 runner-up of The Great Indian Laughter Challenge, a stand-up comedy competition on Star One. Qureshi has been a stage performer for the last 20 years. Most of his jokes focus on political satire and social issues. He had put in his name for the reality show at the behest of his friends. Lately he has been seen acting in a Bollywood movie, Bombay to Goa released in 2007, Ek Paheli Leela released in 2015, and the Bhojpuri film Hanuman Bhakt Hawaldar released in 2007. He was seen in SAB TV comedy show Hum Aapke Ghar Mein Rehte Hain. He was a contestant in Bigg Boss 2 in 2007.

== Filmography ==
Year	Film	Role
2007	Bombay to Goa	Abdul Karim Telgi
2007	Hanuman Bhakt Hawaldar (Bhojpuri film)	
2009	Ek Se Bure Do	Akbar
2010	Bhavnao Ko Samjho	Advocate Babulal Fansiwala
2012	Ab Hoga Dharna Unlimited	Tillu
2015	Ek Paheli Leela	Maan Singh
2015	Mere Genie Uncle	Sher Khan
2019	Wig Boss	Friend

=== Television ===
Year	Serial	Role	TV Channel	Notes
2005	The Great Indian Laughter Challenge	Contestant	Star One	First Runner-up
2006	Takeshi's Castle	Narrator	Pogo TV	Hindi dubbed version
2008	Bigg Boss 2	Contestant	Colors TV	Evicted in week 9
2009	Raju Hazir Ho	Himself	NDTV Imagine	
2015	Tu Mera Hero	Himself as Talent Show Judge	Star Plus	Special appearance
2015	Hum Aapke Ghar Mein Rehte Hain	Professor Jai Prakash Tripathi	SAB TV	
2017	The Kapil Sharma Show	Himself	Sony TV	Episode 93; Guest appearance with Sunil Pal and Raju Srivastav
2017–2018	Yeh Un Dinon Ki Baat Hai	Principal Pandey	Sony TV	
