= Journey Bombay to Goa =

Journey Bombay To Goa
- Directed by: Raj Pendurkar
- Produced by: Humayu Rangilla
- Starring: Sunil Pal; Asrani; Dinesh Hingoo; Jagdeep; Anirudh Agarwal; Jr. Mehmood; Mac Mohan; Navin Prabhakar; Paintal; Ahsaan Qureshi; Aasif Sheikh; Raju Shrivastava; Sanjay Mishra; Shakti Kapoor; Tinu Anand; Vijay Raaz; Viju Khote
- Music by: Nitin Shankar
- Distributed by: Eros Entertainment
- Release date: 6 July 2007
- Country: India
- Language: Hindi

Bombay To Goa, also known as Journey Bombay to Goa: Laughter Unlimited, is a 2007 Indian Hindi-language film. It stars Indian comedians Sunil Pal, Aasif Sheikh, Raju Srivastava, Ahsaan Qureshi, and comic actors Vijay Raaz, Asrani and Tinnu Anand among others. The film was reportedly financed by Amit Kumar who was arrested for running an illegal kidney sale operation.

== Plot ==
The film revolves around two people. Lal is an ambitious guy who wants to start his own business and make it big in life. Das is a loudmouth and a very arrogant person. The two manage to get hold of 5100 rupees, and they open a vada pav centre. As luck would have it, Lal wins Rs. 2 lakhs in a contest. The duo plans to start a travel agency. Since they do not have enough money to buy a vehicle, they use spare parts of old cars to create a bus. Trusting Das to come up with a good make of a bus, he blindly hands over the prize money to him. Lal manages to get passengers for their first ride. But when their bus arrives, all hell breaks loose with people demanding their money back. But when the passengers are forced to ride in it, it creates a unique experience for them.

The group finds a dying thief, and he tells them about a hidden prize with a map. They tear the map, and everyone keeps a piece to work together. However, greed leads to a rat race, but they somehow manage to find gold under a statue, which they pull down, but the gold is seized by the police. After the police are off with the gold, the passengers as well as the bus owner duo begin to repent their greed and decide to do a "philanthropic" job by fixing the fallen statue. But trying to fix the statue, they manage to break it into pieces. Inside is a pack of diamonds. Lal thanks God for the reward, and everybody gets their share of the diamonds.

== Cast ==
- Sunil Pal as Lal Singh
- Raju Srivastav as Anthony Gonsalves
- Vijay Raaz as Dasa
- Ehsaan Qureshi as Abudul Karim Telgi
- Aasif Sheikh as Dr. Kushal Bhardwaj
- Sudhir Pandey as Charandas
- Anirudh Agarwal as Junglee
- Tinu Anand as Bibhuti Bhushan Banopadhya
- Asrani as Post master
- Birbal
- Dinesh Hingoo as Pakya's Dad
- Jagdeep as Latif Khekada - Husna's dad
- Banwarhlal Jhol as Dhasrat
- Bharat Kapoor as Inspector at Dongri Police Chowki
- Shakti Kapoor as A.C.P Shakti Singh
- Mushtaq Khan as Radha's dad
- Khayali as Pakya
- Viju Khote as Patient in wheelchair
- Sanjay Mishra as Bengali Sardar
- Nafisa as Lajjo V. Kutti
- Paintal
- Navin Prabhakar
- Deepak Raja as Aditya Chopra
- Ranjeet as Colonel
- Rakheee as Deepa V. Kutti
- Sheela Sharma as Pakya's Mom
- Deepak Shirke as Vishwavaram Kunmali Kutti Kutti Kutti / Vetti Kutti Anna
- Mac Mohan as Harley Davidson
- Sana Khan as an item number

== Production ==
Bombay to Goa is the directorial debut for Raj Pendurkar, who said about the film that it is an out-and-out comedy film with "nothing different", calling it "very basic. It is about regular people, normal people. And we are trying to get humour out of them." Pendurkar said the film is not a remake of the 1972 film of the same name. His cast included several stars from Indian television, and the film was shot in Goa, among other places, in 2006.

== Soundtrack ==
The music was composed by Nitin Shankar, and Ravi Meet, and lyrics were written by Shabbir Ahmed. The soundtrack was released by Eros Music.

Bombay to Goa

Soundtrack album by Nitin Shankar Ravi Meet
- Released: February 2007
- Recorded: 2007
- Genre: Soundtrack
- Length: 32:16
- Label: Eros Music
- Producer: Nitin Shankar; Ravi Meet

Track list
No.	Title	Music	Singer(s)	Length
1.	"Laaj Sharam"	Ravi Meet	Shehla Burney	6:31
2.	"Bombay To Goa (Female)"	Nitin Shankar	Shehla Burney	5:57
3.	"Lawani"	Ravi Meet	Sonu Kakkar	4:31
4.	"Let's Enjoy"	Nitin Shankar	Zubeen Garg	3:59
5.	"Bombay To Goa (Male)"	Nitin Shankar	Bappi Lahiri	5:57
6.	"Kamjarf"	Ravi Meet	Shehla Burney, Shabab Sabri	5:21
Total length:				32:16

== Release and reception ==
The film was lambasted by critics. The Tribune gave the film a mixed review, saying it is "overall a fair attempt, but the length of the movie could go against it". Taran Adarsh of Bollywood Hungama gave the film 2 out of 5 stars, calling it "a fair attempt that may appeal to those with an appetite for comic capers". The Times of India was particularly critical of the film, labelling it "a monumental waste" and dismissing the humour as "completely flat". Shubhra Gupta of The Indian Express panned the film, concluding, "Even in terms of low-grade comedy, this is scraping the bottom of the barrel. We left within thirty minutes."

In retrospect, DNA India listed it one of the "disastrous road films" made during the 2000s.
