= The Great Indian Laughter Challenge =

Indian Stand-up Comedy Show

- Genre: Reality
- Country of origin: India
- Original language: Hindi
- No. of seasons: 5
- No. of episodes: 193

Production
- Production location: Mumbai
- Camera setup: Multi-camera
- Running time: approximately 48 minutes
- Production company: Endemol

Original release
- Network: STAR One (season 1–4); STAR Plus (season 5)
- Release: 3 June 2005 – 30 December 2017

Related
- Laughter Knights

The Great Indian Laughter Challenge is an Indian reality stand-up comedy series produced by Endemol India. The first four seasons aired on STAR One from 15 June 2005 to 26 September 2008. The show's fifth season premiered on 30 September 2017 on STAR Plus and was judged by actor Akshay Kumar.

The show is based on a format where stand-up comedians perform and entertain judges and the studio audience with their comedy skills. The first three seasons of the show saw TV personality Shekhar Suman, and politician Navjot Singh Sidhu on the judging panel. The show's initial episodes were hosted by Parizaad Kolah Marshall and later she was replaced by Shonali Nagrani. The fifth season was hosted by Elli Avram. The set was designed by noted Bollywood production designer Nitin Chandrakant Desai. In the fourth season, Shatrughan Sinha replaced Navjot Singh Sidhu as judge as per season.

== Seasons ==
In the first season, Sunil Pal was the winner, while Ahsaan Qureshi finished as runner up and Raju Srivastava as second runner up. In the second season, contestants from Pakistan were present, and the winner Rauf Lala was from Pakistan. The third season was won by Kapil Sharma and the first runner up was Chandan Prabhakar both from Amritsar. Many other talented comedians like Siraj Khan, Sudesh Lehari, Rajiv Thakur, Bharti Singh, Navin Prabhakar, Jassi Kochar, Khayaali, Dipoo Srivastava, Ahsaan Qureshi have appeared in the show.

The first two seasons were followed by another show, The Great Indian Laughter Champions, which included top performers of the previous shows. Here also the judges were Sidhu and Shekar including some celebrity guests as well.

The first woman to participate was Aarti Kandpal in the third season. The fourth season's finalists were Rasbihari Gaur, Bharti Singh, Suresh Albela, and a duo Sikander Sanam-Wali Sheikh (veteran stage comedians from Pakistan). The winner for the fourth season after a tough laughter war was Suresh Albela.

The fifth season had 3 mentors, namely, Zakir Khan, Hussain Dalal and Mallika Dua, while the judges were replaced by Sajid Khan and Shreyas Talpade, the two of whom along with Akshay Kumar, selected 12 finalists who competed for the title.

== Season I (2005) ==
- Sunil Pal (Winner)
- Ahsaan Qureshi (First Runner-up)
- Raju Srivastav (Second Runner-up)
- Navin Prabhakar
- Bhagwant Mann
- Parag Kansara

== Season II (2006) ==
- Rauf Lala (Winner)
- Rajeev Nigam (Runner-up)
- Khayali
- Pratap Faujdar
- Irfan Malik and Ali Hassan (Pakistan)
- Amanullah (Guest Appearance)
- Dr. Tushar Shah
- Rajkumar Javkar
- Saransh Bhardwaj (guest appearance)
- Gaurav K. Jha

== Season III (2007) ==
- Kapil Sharma (Winner)
- Chandan Prabhakar (Runner-up)
- Sudesh Lehri (Second Runner-up)
- Amanullah Khan
- Deepak Saini
- Rajiv Thakur
- Parvez Siddiqui (Pakistan)

== Season IV (2008) ==
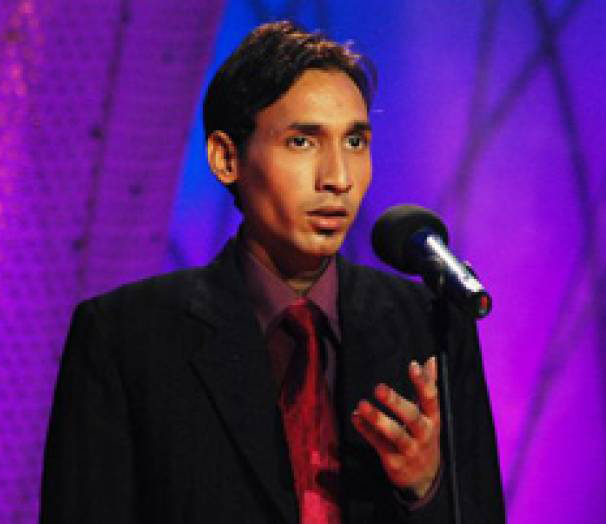
Winner of season 4, Suresh Albela.

- Suresh Albela (Winner)
- Sikandar Sanam (First Runner-up) (Pakistan)
- Bharti Singh (Second runner-up)
- Rasbihari Gaur (Third runner-up)
- Sunil Thakkar (Houston, TX)
- Wali Sheikh (Pakistan)
- Jaswant Singh
- Srikant Maski
- Ramdas Yeole
- Rehan Jamal (Pakistan)
- Sugandha Mishra
- Vinod Rathore
- Anirudh Madesia

== Season V (2017) ==
- Abhishek Walia (Winner)
- Nitesh Shetty (Runner-up)
- Vighnesh Pande
- Mohd Anas
- Parvindar Singh
- Vishwash Chauhan
- Shyam Rangeela
- Abhay Kumar
- Naman Jain
- Sumit Sourav
- Shikha Singh
- Vidushi Swaroop
- Ajay Singh Chauhan
- Gaurav Gupta
- Jayvijay Sachan
- Haider Rizvi (writer)
- Vankush Arora (Writer)
