= Vinay Anand =

Indian actor

- Born: Mumbai, Maharashtra, India
- Occupation: Actor
- Years active: 1999-2015
- Spouse: Jyoti Anand
- Parent: Pushpa Ahuja Anand (mother)
- Relatives: Govinda (maternal uncle); Krushna Abhishek (cousin); Ragini Khanna (cousin)

Vinay Anand is an Indian actor, having featured in around 60 Hindi and Bhojpuri movies. Known for his roles in movies like Dil Ne Phir Yaad Kiya, Sautela, Jahan Jaaeyega Hamen Paaeyega and Aamdani Atthani Kharcha Rupaiyaa, he is also a nephew of Bollywood actor Govinda.

== Family life ==
Born on 23 March 1978, Vinay Anand is the son of songwriter Ravi Anand and of Pushpa Ahuja Anand. Pushpa is Bollywood actor Govinda's sister and the daughter of classical singer Nirmala Devi and of Bollywood actor Arun Kumar Ahuja. Vinay Anand is married to Jyoti Anand, sister of popular South Indian actress Simran.

== Career ==
Vinay Anand debuted with Lo Main Aagaya, starring Prem Chopra, Laxmikant Berde and Mohan Joshi. This film was directed by Mahesh Kothare. After the first film, Vinay was offered with several Hindi movies like Dil Ne Phir Yaad Kiya, Sautela, Jahan Jaaeyega Hume Paiyega, Aamdani Atthani Kharcha Rupaiyaa, etc. Vinay has acted in several Bhojpuri films, in the lead role and has a huge fan following.

== Music album ==
Vinay Anand is now gearing up to make a comeback with a pop album under his newly launched production house, Flying Horses. All the songs have been sung by Vinay himself while Durgesh Vishwakarma is the music composer. Jyoti Anand and Sanjay Kabir have worked as the lyricists on the album. Flying Horses will also produce Hindi films and regional cinema in the coming years.

== Filmography ==
As Actor

Year	Film	Role	Notes
1999	Lo Main Aa Gaya	Ajay	
1999	Sautela	Raju	
2001	Censor	Hero of the film 'Aanewala Kal'	
2001	Dil Ne Phir Yaad Kiya	Rahul	
2001	Aamdani Atthani Kharcha Rupaiyaa	Vijay	
2002	Angaar -The Fire		
2002	Mulaqat	Jas	
2007	Jahan Jaaeyega Hamen Paaeyega	Tito	
2008	Kool Nahin Hot Hain Hum		
2008	Thause Pyar Ba		Bhojpuri films
2008	Khatailal Mithailal		Bhojpuri films
2011	Trinetra		
2015	Khuni Dangal		
2015	Chhora Ganga Kinare Wala		Special appearance
2015	Mangal Phera		
2015	Maai Ke Karz		
