= Nafisah Ahmad Zen Shahab =

- نفیسه أحمد زين شهاب
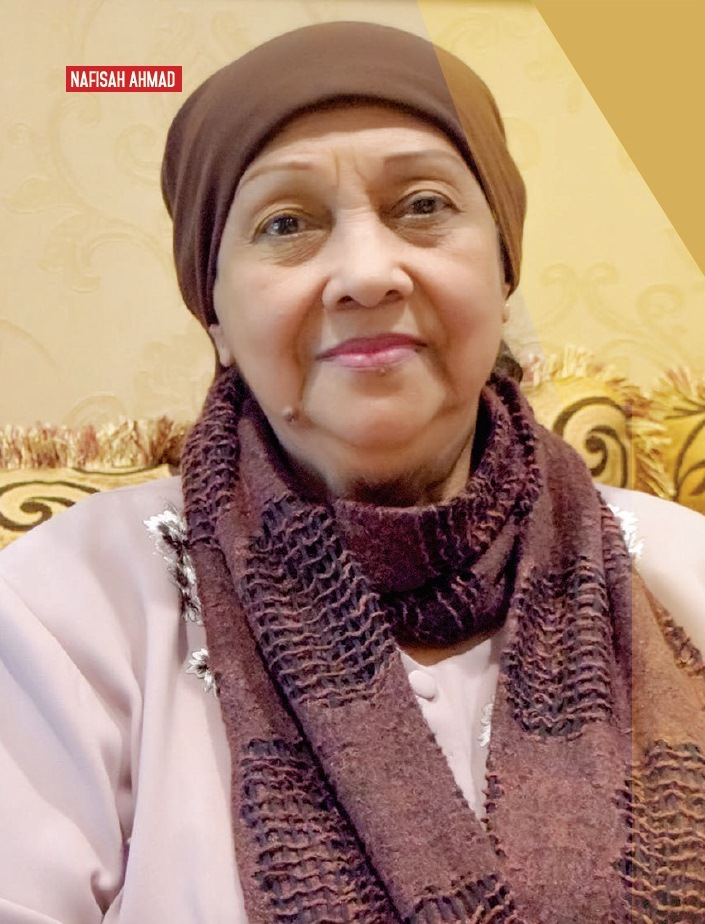
- Born: Nafisah; August 1, 1946 (age 79); Palembang, South Sumatra
- Occupations: Businessperson; merchant
- Known for: Mother of ten doctors
- Spouse: Alwi Idrus Shahab (m. 1961–1996)
- Children: 12 (including Idrus Alwi)
- Awards: Indonesian World Records Museum (February 3, 2010)

Nafisah Ahmad Zen Shahab (Arabic: نفیسه أحمد زين شهاب, romanized: Nafīsah ʾAḥmad Zayn Šahāb; Arabic pronunciation: [nafiːsah ˈ(ʔ)aħmad zajn ʃahaːb]; born August 1, 1946) is an Indonesian batik trader from Palembang, South Sumatra. Nafisah is known as a mother who acts as the sole parent in her family after her husband, Alwi Idrus Shahab died in 1996. On the 20th anniversary commemoration of Indonesian World Records Museum (MURI) at Mall of Indonesia on February 3, 2010, Nafisah, the mother of twelve children, ten of whom became doctors, broke the MURI record as the family with the most doctors in Indonesia. Of her ten children who became doctors, five of them are specialists.
