= Nafisa Abu Bakr al-Malik =

Sudanese political figure and teacher (born 1932)

- نفيسة أبو بكر المليك
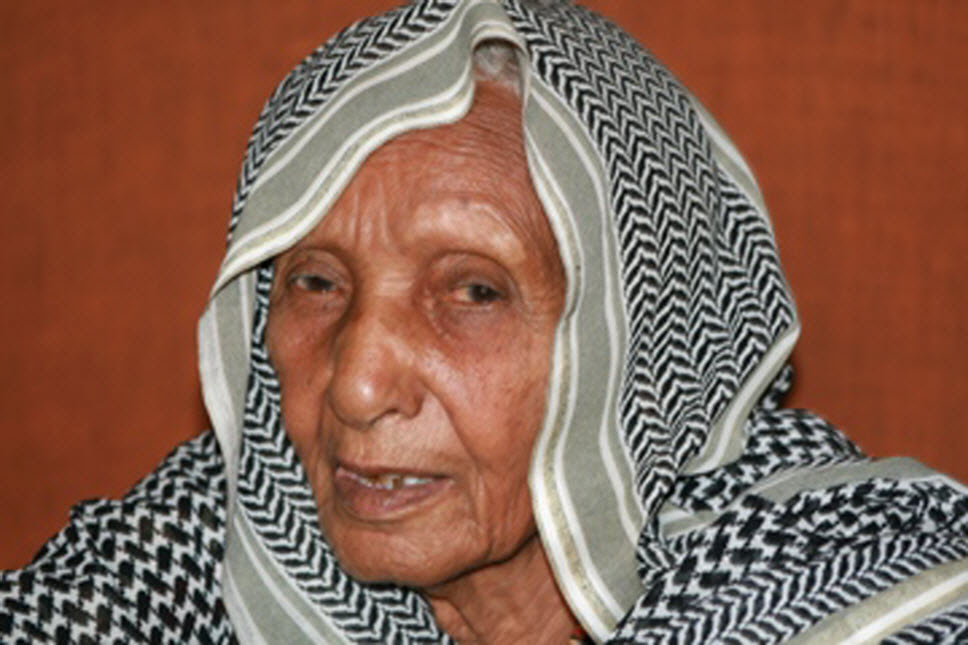
- Born: 1932 (age 93–94); Rufa'a, Sudan
- Citizenship: Sudanese
- Occupations: Educator, teacher, women's rights activist
- Known for: Pioneer in girls' education and co-founder of the Union of Sudanese Women Teachers

Nafisa Abu Bakr al-Malik(Arabic: '''نفيسة أبو بكر المليك'''; born 1932) is a Sudanese educator and women's rights activist. She is recognised as one of the pioneering female teachers in Sudan during the colonial period.

== Early life and education ==
Al-Malik was born in 1932 in Rufa'a, Sudan. Due to her father's frequent transfers, she received her early education in Rufa'a, Port Sudan, and Khartoum North. She completed her intermediate education at the Omdurman International School for Girls

== Work ==
Al-malik was one of the founders of Union of Sudanese Women Teachers in 1949, and her name was listed as a member when the union held its second general conference on 24 April 1952.

She joined primary school service after graduation from teachers training college. In 1947 she took the qualifying course in intermediate teacher school for girls, she joined the teacher training college as a school mistress and became headmistress of after her father's death in 1969.
