= Big Brother (2007 film) =

- Theatrical release poster
- Directed by: Guddu Dhanoa
- Screenplay by: Guddu Dhanoa; Dilip Shukla; Sanjay Chauhan
- Dialogues by: Dilip Shukla; Sanjay Chauhan
- Story by: Santosh Dhanoa
- Based on: Guru by Swapan Saha
- Produced by: Guddu Dhanoa
- Starring: Sunny Deol; Priyanka Chopra; Danny Denzongpa; Shernaz Patel; Farida Jalal; Suhasini Mulay
- Cinematography: Sripad Natu; Raju Kaygee
- Edited by: Sanjay Verma
- Music by: Songs: Anand Raaj Anand; Sandesh Shandilya; Score: Amar Mohile
- Production company: Bhagwan Chitra Mandir
- Distributed by: Shemaroo Entertainment
- Release date: 13 April 2007
- Country: India
- Language: Hindi
- Budget: ₹ 8 crore
- Box office: ₹ 12.09 crore

Big Brother is a 2007 Indian Hindi-language vigilante action film directed by Guddu Dhanoa. Loosely inspired by the 2003 Bengali film Guru, it stars Sunny Deol, Priyanka Chopra and Danny Denzongpa in pivotal roles. It was supposed to be Priyanka Chopra's first release in 2002, but the film was delayed by almost five years.

== Plot ==
Big Brother is a story set in modern India which revolves around a small middle-class family composed of Dev Sharma (Sunny Deol), his wife Aarti (Priyanka Chopra), his mother Sitadevi (Farida Jalal), brother Akash (Imran Khan) and sister Anjali. Although they lead a simple and peaceful lifestyle, an incident occurs that changes their lives forever. The family is left with no choice but to leave Delhi and move to Mumbai in disguise. They start life afresh, and all seems well until the ghosts of the past surface again. Things reach a point when Dev Sharma is prodded by his mother to take a course of action which not only avenges their plight but also takes on the cause of the aggrieved in the country as a whole. The movement so created gets the support of the women at large and the infirm who proudly proclaim him to be their Big Brother.

== Cast ==
- Sunny Deol as Devdhar Gandhi / Dev
- Priyanka Chopra as Aarti Gandhi – Dev's wife
- Danny Denzongpa as Police Commissioner Kudeshwar Negi
- Shernaz Patel as Indu Negi – Kudeshwar's wife
- Farida Jalal as Sitadevi
- Govind Namdeo as Deputy Chief Minister Manohar Shinde
- Imran Khan as Akash Gandhi
- Nishikant Dixit as Inspector
- Avtar Gill as Advocate Nathani
- Suhasini Mulay as Prime Minister Urmila
- Sayaji Shinde as Minister Baburao "Bhau" Kamble
- Shahbaz Khan as Rajji Pandey
- Raju Srivastava as Raju – Rickshaw driver

== Music and soundtrack ==
The music for the film's songs was composed by Anand Raaj Anand and Sandesh Shandilya, and the lyrics of the songs were penned by Sameer, Neelesh Misra and Anil Pandey. The background score of the film was provided by Amar Mohile.

- "Jag Lal Lal Lal" - Zubeen Garg
- "Jag Lal Lal Lal (version 3)" - Zubeen Garg, Ustad Sultan Kahn
- "Baalam Tera Nakhra" - Sunidhi Chauhan
- "Jag Lal Lal Lal (version 2)" - Ustad Sultan Khan
- "Jeevan Tumne Diya Hai" - Udit Narayan, Alka Yagnik, Roop Kumar Rathod, Sadhana Sargam
- "Piya" - Shreya Ghoshal, Kunal Ganjawala, Ustad Sultan Khan
- "Lak Tunu Tunu" - Anand Raj Anand, Jaspinder Narula
