= Sunil Pal =

Indian actor and comedian (born 1975)

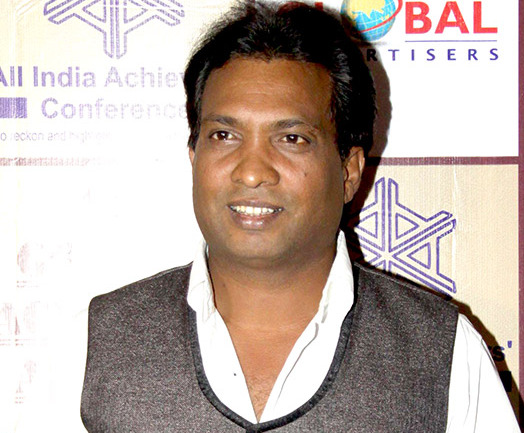
- Pal in 2016
- Born: 2 May 1975 (age 51); Maharashtra, India
- Occupations: Comedian; actor; voice actor
- Known for: Stage comedy
- Website: sunilpalcomedian.com

Sunil Pal (born 2 May 1975) is an Indian stand-up comedian, actor and voice actor. He has played comic roles in various Bollywood films.

In 2010, he wrote and directed a comedy film, Bhavnao Ko Samjho, which featured 47 stand-up comedians including Siraj Khan, Johnny Lever, Raju Srivastav, Kapil Sharma, Navin Prabhakar, Ahsaan Qureshi, and Sudesh Lehri.

== Early life ==
Sunil Pal was born in 1975 into a middle class Marathi speaking family in Maharashtra. His father was an employee for the Indian Railways. He studied in Janata Vidyalaya city branch school, Balharshah. He came to Mumbai in 1995 when his father got transferred. He joined the Junior College. There he used to mimic his professors and famous actors. After college, he struggled for three years.

== Career ==
=== Early career ===
During one of his interviews, Pal said "I was working at a tea stall in Santacruz as tea seller. Those days I'd sleep on the footpath and I used to use the telephones of a nearby shop to keep in touch with my contacts in film industry."

He gained popularity as a contestant in comedy show The Great Indian Laughter Challenge in 2005, in which he emerged as the winner.

=== Films ===
Pal's first major Hindi film, Bombay to Goa released in 2007, although he has played small roles in Hum Tum (2004) and Phir Hera Pheri (2006). He has also worked in Apna Sapna Money Money and he has produced, written, and directed a film called Bhavnao ko Samjho. Pal and his wife hold the Guinness Book of World Record for casting 47 stand-up comedians to act in a single film.

== Controversies ==
Pal has been involved in public disputes with several contemporary Indian comedians. In 2016, following the controversy surrounding comedian Tanmay Bhat's video mimicking Sachin Tendulkar and Lata Mangeshkar, Pal criticised Bhat and made remarks about the audience for English-language stand-up comedy that were widely criticised as homophobic.

In 2025, Pal criticised comedian Samay Raina and other participants following the controversy surrounding the latter's show India's Got Latent, particularly in response to the remarks made by Ranveer Allahbadia. Pal disparaged Raina and Allahbadia and argued that contemporary comedians relied excessively on vulgarity. Raina subsequently responded to Pal's criticism, calling him a "frustrated man".

The disagreement continued into 2026, with Pal and Raina exchanging jokes and criticism in public appearances, including an appearance together on The Great Indian Kapil Show and in an advertisement video for STRCH.

== 2024 kidnapping ==
Pal was kidnapped and held hostage on 2 December 2024. He was abducted, when he was on the way to an event in Haridwar, where he was invited by the kidnappers in the pretext of live performance. The kidnappers reportedly asked for a ransom of ₹20 lakh and released him after twenty four hours on the Delhi-Meerut road with ₹20,000 to return home.

The case took a new turn when two audio recordings surfaced, suggesting the incident may have been a publicity stunt.

Pal's wife reported the incident to the police, asserting that the audio recordings were edited. Police identified two main accused, named Lavi Pal and Arjun Karnwal, for kidnapping Sunil Pal and a similar kidnapping case of comedian Mushtaq Khan.

On 14 December 2024, Uttar Pradesh Police arrested Arjun; he was shot and injured the next day during an encounter with police in Meerut. Police recovered an SUV along with ₹2.25 lakh cash and a mobile phone believed to be used in the crime from the accused.

On the night of 22-23 December, Police arrested the main accused person, Lavi Pal, for the kidnapping of Mushtaq Khan and Sunil Pal after an encounter in Bijnor. A total of seven arrests were made in the case.

== Filmography ==
=== Films ===
Year	Films	Role	Notes
2006	Phir Hera Pheri	Munna Bhai's sidekick	
2006	Apna Sapna Money Money	Matha Prasad's assistant	
2007	Bombay to Goa	Lal Singh	
2008	Krazzy 4	Taxi Yadav	
2010	Bhavnao Ko Samjho	Sunderlal Yadav	also director
2014	Kick		
2014	Money Back Guarantee		also director
2015	Sasu Cha Swayamwar	Baji	Marathi film
2015	Main Hoon Rajinikanth	Arvind Mukherji The Khaas Aadmi	
2015	Dirty Politics	Nathu Lal	
2016	Alya Have Shu?		Gujarati film
2018	Teri Bhabhi Hai Pagle		
2022	Gaali Galoj		

=== Television ===
Year	Serial	Role	Notes
2005	The Great Indian Laughter Challenge - I	Contestant (Winner)	
2006	The Great Indian Comedy Show	Host/presenter	
2008	Comedy Champions	Contestant	
2010	Comedy Circus Ke SuperStars	Contestant	with Priya Marathe
2026	The Great Indian Kapil Show	Guest	with Samay Raina, Ranveer Allahbadia

=== Radio ===
Year	Show	Role
2007	Dhamaal with Sunil Pal	Co-host
