= Star One (TV channel) =

Defunct Indian television channel

- Country: India
- Broadcast area: Indian subcontinent; United Kingdom; Ireland
- Network: Star India
- Headquarters: Mumbai, Maharashtra, India

Ownership
- Owner: News Corporation (Star India and Fox International Channels)
- Sister channels: List: StarPlus; Star Utsav; Star Gold; Star Pravah; Star Jalsha; Asianet; Star Vijay; Star Maa

History
- Launched: 1 November 2004
- Closed: 18 December 2011 in India; 28 May 2012 in UK
- Replaced by: Life OK

Star One was an Indian pay television channel based in Mumbai and owned by Star TV, with worldwide distribution handled by Fox International Channels. Launched on 1 November 2004, Star One was launched in the UK on Sky in November 2006.

Star One was rebranded as Life OK on 18 December 2011. Its British feed continued broadcasting in the UK and Ireland until 28 May 2012, when it was also rebranded as Star Life OK.

== Programming ==
This is the list of original programming formerly broadcast by Star One.

=== Anthology ===
Year	Show	Ref.
2004–2005	Studio One	

=== Children's television ===
Year	Show	Ref.
2005–2007	Aflatoons	
2006–2009	A.T.O.M	
2005–2007	Braceface	
2005–2006	Gargoyles	
2006–2007	Power Rangers Dino Thunder	
2008–2009	Power Rangers Lightspeed Rescue	
2008	Power Rangers Ninja Storm	
2007–2008	Power Rangers Wild Force	
2005–2006	Spider-Man	
2008	Spider-Man and His Amazing Friends	
2005–2008	The New Adventures of Lucky Luke	
2005–2006	Super Robot Monkey Team Hyperforce Go!	
2009	Teenage Mutant Ninja Turtles	
2007–2008	W.I.T.C.H.	
2006–2007	The World of Tosh	

=== Comedy ===
Year	Show	Ref.
2007–2008	Annu Ki Ho Gayee Wah Bhai Wah	
2007–2008	Funjabbi Chak De	
2004–2007	The Great Indian Comedy Show	
2007	HA HA HA	
2005	Happy Go Lucky	
2004–2005	Hey...Yehii To Haii Woh!	
2009	Hum Dono Hain Alag Alag	
2005	Instant Khichdi	
2006–2007	Kadvee Khattee Meethi	
2006–2007	Kyaa Hoga Nimmo Kaa	
2007	Naya Office Office	
2008–2009	Paani Puri	
2004–2006	Sarabhai vs Sarabhai	

=== Drama ===
Year	Show	Ref.
2006–2007	Betiyaan Apni Yaa Paraaya Dhan	
2007–2008	Chhoona Hai Aasmaan	
2010–2011	Dhoondh Legi Manzil Humein	
2005	Dil Kya Chahta Hai	
2007–2010	Dill Mill Gayye	
2006	Detective Omkar Nath (D.O.N.)	
2004–2005	Family Business	
2010–2011	Geet – Hui Sabse Parayi	
2004–2005	Guns & Roses	
2004–2005	Hotel Kingston	
2005–2006	India Calling	
2009–2010	Jaane Pehchaane Se... Ye Ajnabbi	
2006–2007	Kyaa Hoga Nimmo Kaa	
2009–2010	Love Ne Mila Di Jodi	
2008–2010	Miley Jab Hum Tum	
2008	Pari Hoon Main	
2004–2005	Pyar Ki Kashti Mein	
2010–2011	Rang Badalti Odhani	
2004–2006	Remix	
2006	Resham Dankh	
2006–2007	Saathii Re	
2004–2005	Siddhant	
2004–2005	Special Squad	
2007	Viraasat	
2005–2006	Yeh Dil Chahe More	
2010–2011	Yeh Ishq Haaye	
2011	Yeh Tera Ghar Yeh Mera Ghar	

=== Horror/supernatural ===
Year	Show	Ref.
2006–2007	Ghost Bana Dost	
2006–2010	Mano Ya Na Mano	
2010–2011	Pyaar Kii Ye Ek Kahaani	
2009	Shakuntala	
2006–2010	Ssshhhh...Phir Koi Hai	
2010	Star One Horror Nights	

=== Reality/uscripted ===
Year	Show	Ref.
2007	Antakshari – The Great Challenge	
2006	Apni Tuning Jamegi	
2008	Bingo Aur Suresh Menon	
2004–2005	Bluff Master	
2004–2005	Body & Soul	
2007–2008	Bol Baby Bol	
2004–2005	Cook Na Kaho	
2006-2007	Ek Se Badhkar Ek	
2004–2005	Exotica	
2005	Games Bond	
2005–2008	The Great Indian Laughter Challenge	
2009	Hans Baliye	
2004–2005	Har Ghar Kuch Kehta Hai	
2006	Heartbeat	
2008–2009	Hello Kaun? Pehchaan Kaun	
2004–2005	He Man	
2004–2006	Home Shanti Home	
2010	India's Magic Star	
2006	Jet Set Go	
2008	Kisko Milega Cash	
2005–2007	Koffee with Karan	
2004–2005	Lakme Fashion House	
2009	Laughter Ke Phatke	
2008–2009	Laughter Knights	
2007–2008	Lead India	
2004–2005	Men Mange More	
2005–2006	Nach Baliye	
2007	Ranvir Vinay Aur Kaun?	
2005	Super Sale	
2008	Zara Nachke Dikha	

=== Reruns of Star Plus series ===
Year	Show	Ref.
2008	Hatim	
2006	Kaun Banega Crorepati	
2009–2010	Mind Games - Baazi Dimag Ki	
2008	Mum Tum Aur Hum	
2008	Shaka Laka Boom Boom	
2008	Shararat – Thoda Jaadu, Thodi Nazaakat	
2009	Shanno Ki Shaadi	
2008	Son Pari	
2009–2010	Tere Mere Beach Mein	
2008	Vikraal Aur Gabraal	

=== Star One UK ===
Year	Show	Ref.
2009–2010	Hot Seat	
