= Raju Srivastav =

Indian comedian, actor and politician (1963–2022)

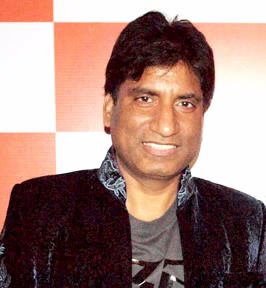
- Srivastav during an event in 2012
- Born: Satyaprakash Srivastav; 25 December 1963; Kanpur, Uttar Pradesh, India
- Died: 21 September 2022 (aged 58); Delhi, India
- Notable work: The Great Indian Laughter Challenge
- Spouse: Shikha Srivastav (m. 1993)
- Children: 2
- Relatives: Kushal Srivastava (nephew)

Comedy career
- Genre: Observational comedy

Satya Prakash Srivastav (25 December 1963 – 21 September 2022), known professionally as Raju Srivastav and often credited as Gajodhar, was an Indian comedian, actor and politician. He was born in Kanpur, Uttar Pradesh, and moved to Mumbai in the 1980s to work in the Hindi film industry. He acted in Baazigar, Bombay to Goa, Aamdani Atthanni Kharcha Rupaiya among others. He contested in the comedy show The Great Indian Laughter Challenge and became the runner-up. He won the title of "The King of Comedy" in its spin-off show The Great Indian Laughter Challenge – Champions. He did many stand-up comedy live shows.

He had been a member of the Bharatiya Janata Party since 2014.

== Early life ==
He was born in 1963 in Kanpur city in the state of Uttar Pradesh in a Kayastha family. His father Ramesh Srivastav was a poet. In his childhood, Srivastav liked to mimic film stars including Amitabh Bachchan.

== Career ==
In 1980s he moved to Mumbai, and started his career by doing small roles in Bollywood films. He had a part in the Rajshri Productions movie Maine Pyar Kiya and other small roles in various movies such as Baazigar and Bombay to Goa. He worked as an actor and comedian in the Bollywood movie Aamdani Atthanni Kharcha Rupaiya.

In 2005, he ventured into stand-up comedy with the talent show The Great Indian Laughter Challenge and finished as second runner-up. Then he took part in its spin-off, The Great Indian Laughter Challenge – Champions, and won the title of "The King of Comedy". He became famous because of this show. By 2009, he had done more than 2,800 live shows.

In 2009, in an interview, he said the vulgarity in comedy shows was a concern for him. He believed that comedians should practice self-regulation. Srivastav participated in Bigg Boss (Hindi season 3), the Indian counterpart of the Big Brother. After staying in the house for more than two months he was voted out on 4 December 2009. In 2010, Srivastav received threatening calls from Pakistan warning him not to crack jokes on underworld don Dawood Ibrahim and Pakistan during his shows.

In 2013, Raju along with his wife participated in Nach Baliye season 6, which is a couples dance show on StarPlus. He has also appeared on Comedy Nights with Kapil.

In 2016, he appeared in Mazaak Mazaak Mein, a Hindi reality television talent competition.

In 2019 participated in the comedy show Comedy Ka Maha Muqabala.

== Political career ==
The Samajwadi Party (SP) fielded Srivastava from Kanpur Lok Sabha constituency for the 2014 Lok Sabha election. But on 11 March 2014, Srivastav returned the ticket, saying he was not getting enough support from the local units of the party. SP was expecting him to quit as the contest in the seat had become important. SP withdrew his candidature from Kanpur after he quit.

Within days of leaving SP, he joined the Bharatiya Janata Party (BJP) on 19 March 2014. BJP did not give him the ticket for Lok Sabha 2014. He campaigned in support of BJP candidates in Lok Sabha and Assembly elections. In 2014, he was appointed by the BJP led Union government as the brand ambassador of the Swachh Bharat Abhiyan and had recorded advertisements for the campaign. In 2018, Srivastav disclosed on social media that he would get the chance to contest in the 2019 Indian general election as BJP candidate for Lok Sabha, although that did not materialize.

In March 2019, he was appointed by the BJP-led Government of Uttar Pradesh as the chairman of the Uttar Pradesh Film Development Council.

== Reception ==
Widely described as the "king of comedy", his looks were also noted for having resembled Amitabh Bachchan.

In January 2021, Raju Srivastav released a small video clip on social media criticizing the creators and actors of the web series Tandav for allegedly hurting Hindu sentiments by insulting Hindu religion and Hindu deities. In response, filmmaker Vinod Kapri and others shared several videos of Srivastav's comedy shows where he had used Hindu deities and the Indian holy epic Ramayana in his comedy sketches. Kapri said that Srivastav had mocked the Hindu god Brahma and had joked about Brahma meeting actress Madhuri Dixit and his white beard turning red.

Following Shrivastav's death, comedian Sunil Pal praised Shrivastav and added that "He would help juniors find gigs. He would also help his juniors financially, made sure they are paid on time and paid well. He brought in a lot of good changes in the comedy circle". Comedian Bharti Singh said that Shrivastav's death is "a great loss for the entire country".

== Personal life ==
Srivastav married Shikha from Lucknow on 1 July 1993. They had two children, a boy and a girl.

== Death ==
On 10 August 2022, while running on the treadmill in the gym, Raju Srivastav complained of chest pain and suffered a cardiac arrest. He underwent an angioplasty and was put on ventilator. Swelling was observed in his brain during his treatment and he was also treated by neurologists. His condition was stated to be critical ever since he suffered the heart attack. On the morning of 21 September 2022, he died during his treatment in Delhi.

The post mortem was done using the method of virtual autopsy. His last rites were conducted in Delhi.

Prolific figures including Narendra Modi, Yogi Adityanath, Rajnath Singh, Amit Shah, Ajay Devgn, Akshay Kumar, Anil Kapoor, Vivek Agnihotri, Rajpal Yadav and others expressed their condolences over Shrivastav's death.

== Filmography ==
=== Films ===
Year	Title	Role	Ref
1988	Tezaab		
1989	Maine Pyaar Kiya	Truck Cleaner	
1993	Baazigar	College Student	
1994	Ishq Mein Jeena Ishq Mein Marna	Pashah	
1994	Mr. Azaad		
2001	Aamdani Atthani Kharcha Rupaiyaa	Baba Chin Chin Choo	
2002	Waah! Tera Kya Kehna	Banne Khan's assistant	
2003	Main Prem Ki Diwani Hoon	Shambhu, Sanjana's servant	
2007	Big Brother	Autorickshaw Driver & Rizwan Ahmed	
2007	Bombay to Goa	Anthony Gonsalves	
2010	Bhavnaon ko Samjho	Daya from Gaya	
2017	Toilet: Ek Prem Katha		
2023	Kanjoos Makhichoos	Yadav, MLA's PA	

=== TV series ===
Year	Series	Role	Ref
1994	Dekh Bhai Dekh	Cameo	
1998–2005	Shaktimaan	Dhurandhar Singh	
2005	The Great Indian Laughter Challenge	Contestant	
2006	Jet Set Go!	Host/presenter	
2007–2014	Comedy Circus	Various characters	
2008–2009	Raju Hazir Ho	Himself	
2009	Taarak Mehta Ka Ooltah Chashmah	Himself	
2009	Bigg Boss	Contestant	
2011	Comedy Ka Maha Muqabala	Contestant	
2013–2014	Nach Baliye	Contestant	
2013–2016	Comedy Nights with Kapil	Various characters	
2014	Gangs of Haseepur	Host	
2016–2017	The Kapil Sharma Show	Various characters	
2016	Mazaak Mazaak Mein	Himself	
2022	Hostel Daze	Chai Tapri Wala/Narrator	
