= List of Indian comedians =

This is a list of notable Indian comedians, sorted by country or area of notability.

== India ==
- 2 Foreigners In Bollywood
- Ahsaan Qureshi
- Ajey Nagar (CarryMinati)
- Akaash Singh
- Ali
- Allu Ramalingaiah
- Amit Bhadana
- Anubhav Singh Bassi
- Anup Kumar
- Appurv Gupta
- Atul Khatri
- Bharti Singh
- Bhuvan Bam
- Binnu Dhillon
- Biswa Kalyan Rath
- Brahmanandam (Kanneganti Brahmanandam)
- Cell Murugan
- Charle
- Chinmoy Roy
- Goundamani
- Gurpreet Ghuggi
- Gaurav Kapoor
- Gursimran Khamba
- Harisree Ashokan
- Harsha Chemudu
- Jagathy Sreekumar
- Janagaraj
- Jaswinder Bhalla
- Jaya Prakash Reddy
- Johny Lever Janumala
- Kader Khan
- Kanan Gill
- Kaneez Surka
- Kapil Sharma
- Karthik Kumar
- Kenny Sebastian
- Keshto Mukherjee
- Kishore Kumar
- Kunal Kamra
- Mallika Dua
- Mehmood
- Mubeen Saudagar
- Munawar Faruqui
- Mir
- M. S. Narayana
- Santhanam
- Santhanam
- Nishant Tanwar
- Prudhvi Raj
- Padmanabham
- Papa CJ
- Rabi Ghosh
- Raghu Babu
- Rahul Dua
- Raja Babu
- Rajendra Nath
- Rajpal Yadav
- Rao Gopal Rao
- Rehman Khan
- Rohan Joshi
- Rudranil Ghosh
- Samay Raina
- Sanjay Rajoura
- Santosh Dutta
- Sapan Verma
- Saswata Chatterjee
- Satish Kaushik
- Saanand Verma
- Senthil
- Shraddha Jain
- Shyam Rangeela
- Sivakarthikeyan
- Sorabh Pant
- Sumona Chakravarti
- Sumukhi Suresh
- Sunil
- Sunil Grover
- Sunil Pal
- Tanmay Bhat
- Tulsi Chakraborty
- Upasana Singh
- Utpal Dutta
- V.I.P.
- Vadivelu
- Varun Grover (writer)
- Vasu Primlani
- Vennela Kishore
- Venu Madhav
- Vir Das
- Vivek
- Yogi Babu
- Zakir Khan (comedian)

=== Bollywood (Hindi cinema) ===
- Ahsaan Qureshi
- Akshay Kumar
- Ali Asgar
- Anupam Kher
- Ashok Saraf
- Asit Sen
- Asrani
- Bhagwan Dada
- Bharti Singh
- Bharti Singh
- Bomman Irani
- Dada Kondke
- Deven Verma
- Govinda
- I. S. Johar
- Jagdeep
- Jaspal Bhatti
- Johnny Lever
- Johnny Walker
- Kader Khan
- Kapil Sharma
- Keshto Mukherjee
- Kiku Sharda
- Kishore Kumar
- Krishna Abhishek
- Laxmikant Berde
- Manorama
- Mehmood
- Mukri
- Navin Prabhakar
- Om Prakash
- Paintal
- Paresh Rawal
- Preeti Ganguly
- Rajendra Nath
- Rajpal Yadav
- Raju Srivastav
- Rakesh Bedi
- Satish Kaushik
- Satish Shah
- Shakti Kapoor
- Sudesh Lehri
- Sumeet Raghavan
- Sunil Grover
- Sunil Grover
- Sunil Pal
- Tiku Talsania
- Tun Tun
- Vir Das

=== Tollywood (Telugu cinema) ===
- Brahmanandam (Kanneganti Brahmanandam)
- Kota Srinivasa Rao
- Sunil (Indukuri Sunil Varma)
- Tanikella Bharani
- Rajendra Prasad (Gadde Rajendra Prasad)
- Rao Gopal Rao
- Jaya Prakash Reddy
- Mallikarjuna Rao
- Rallapalli
- AVS (Amanchi Venkata Subrahmanyam)
- L.B. Sriram (Lanka Bhadradri Sri Ram)
- Ali (Basha Ali)
- M.S. Narayana (Mailavarapu Surya Narayana)
- Naresh
- Allari Naresh (Edara Naresh)
- Venu Madhav
- Babu Mohan
- Krishna Bhagavan
- Dharmavarapu Subrahmanyam
- Sudhakar (Betha Sudhakar)
- Saptagiri
- Bithiri Sathi
- Hyper Aadi
- Vennela Kishore
- Satya Akkala
- Rahul Ramakrishna
- Dhanraj
- Priyadarshi Pulikonda
- Kovai Sarala
- Suman Shetty
- Dharmavarapu Subramanyam
- Sudigali Sudheer
- Raghu Babu (Yerra Raghu Babu)
- Rajababu (Punyamurthula Appalaraju)
- Giri Babu (Yerra Seshagiri Rao)
- Chandramohan
- Kallu Chidambaram
- Girija
- Khayyum (Khayyum Ali; brother of Ali)
- Krishnudu (Alluri Krishnam Raju)
- Sri Lakshmi
- Allu Rama Lingaiah
- Nagesh (Ceiyur Krishna Gundu Rao)
- Padmanabham
- Rama Prabha
- Nutan Prasad (Tadinada Varaprasad)
- Chitti Babu Punyamurthula
- Thagubothu Ramesh
- Gundu Hanumantha Rao
- Kondavalasa Lakshmana Rao
- Relangi (Relangi Venkata Ramayya)
- Suthi Veerabhadra Rao
- Ramana Reddy (Thikkavarapu Venkata Ramana Reddy)
- Srinivasa Reddy
- Ironleg Sastri (Gunupudi Viswanath Shastri)
- Srihari (Raghumudri Srihari)
- Suryakantham
- Suthivelu (Kurumaddali Lakshmi Narasimha Rao)
- Viva Harsha
- Venu Thottempudi
- Srinivas Avasarala
- Uttej
- Fish Venkat
- Chitram Srinu
- Chalam

=== Kollywood (Tamil cinema) ===
- Vadivelu
- Chitti Babu
- Cho Ramaswamy
- Crazy Mohan
- Ennatha Kannaiya
- Ganja Karuppu
- Goundamani
- Idichapuli Selvaraj
- Imman Annachi
- J.P. Chandrababu
- Janakaraj
- Jangiri Madhumitha
- K.A. Thangavelu
- Kaali Venkat
- Kalabhavan Mani
- Kalaivanar NS Krishnan
- Kali N. Rathnam
- Karunakaran
- Karunas
- Kovai Sarala
- Loose Mohan
- M. Saroja
- M.S. Baskar
- Madhan Bob
- Manivannan
- Manorama
- Mayilsamy
- Santhanam
- Nagesh (Ceiyur Krishna Gundu Rao)
- Omakuchi Narasimhan
- Rajendran
- RJ Balaji
- Chachu
- Sathish
- Sathyan
- Senthil
- Sivakarthikeyan
- Soori
- Suruli Rajan
- Thengai Srinivasan
- Vadivel Balaji
- Chinni Jayanth
- Vaiyapuri
- Vennira Aadai Moorthy
- Vidyullekha Raman
- Vivek
- Yogi Babu

=== Sandalwood (Kannada cinema) ===
- Balakrishna
- Janardhan
- Bhanu Bandopadhyay
- Bullet Prakash
- Chikkanna
- Dheerendra Gopal
- Dinesh
- Dingri Nagaraj
- Doddanna
- Dwarakish
- Girija Lokesh
- Honnavalli Krishna
- Jaggesh
- Karibasavaiah
- Kashinath
- Komal Kumar
- Kunigal Nagabhushan
- Lokesh
- M. N. Lakshmi Devi
- M. S. Umesh
- Mandya Ramesh
- Mimicry Rajagopal
- Mithra
- Mukhyamantri Chandru
- Musuri Krishnamurthy
- Mysore Lokesh
- Narasimharaju
- Rangayana Raghu
- Ravishankar Gowda
- Rekha Das
- Sadhu Kokila
- Sharan
- Srujan Lokesh
- Tennis Krishna
- Umashree
- Vaijanath Biradar
- Vaishali Kasaravalli

== United Kingdom ==
- Papa CJ
- Sindhu Vee
- Anuvab Pal

== See also ==
- List of Indian YouTubers
