= Daniel Fernandes (comedian) =

Indian stand-up comedian

- Born: 2 August 1984 (age 42); Bombay, Maharashtra, India
- Education: Symbiosis International University (MBA)

Comedy career
- Years active: 2011–present
- Medium: Stand-up
- Genres: Political/news satire, Observational comedy, Black comedy
- Subjects: Current events, Self-deprecation, Religion

Daniel Fernandes (born 2 August 1984) is an Indian stand-up comedian. He is known for his dark and surreal style of comedy, which references social issues in India.

== Early life ==
Daniel Fernandes was born on 2 August 1984 in Bombay, Maharashtra, India and was raised in Goa. He received his MBA in marketing from Symbiosis International University.

== Career ==
Based in Mumbai, Fernandes regularly performs at comedy clubs including Canvas Laugh Club, The Comedy Store, Blue Frog and High Spirits. In his comedic material and interviews, he is known to cover Indian social issues including free speech, student suicide, death penalty and marital rape. He has collaborated with several fellow stand-up comedians including Gursimran Khamba, Aditi Mittal, Biswa Kalyan Rath, Sundeep Rao, Radhika Vaz, Abish Mathew and Kanan Gill.

In October 2015, Fernandes accompanied Nawazuddin Siddiqui for promotions of the 2015 biographical film, Manjhi: The Mountain Man. In March 2015, he hosted Forbes India's entrepreneurial awards event, 30Under30.

Do You Know Who I Am is one of the shows began touring in 2024. In a 2026 interview with cultural critic R. Benedito Ferrão, Fernandes described the show as "an exercise in processing loss. I relive everything I went through during my father’s passing every time I perform these jokes. I also know that my audience is grieving – the loss of a loved one, a friendship, a career, or the box of stash they can’t seem to find, and I guess if I can show them the funny side of the pain they’re in, maybe it won’t hurt that much. It worked for me."
