= Aakash Gupta =

Indian stand-up comedian (born 1993)

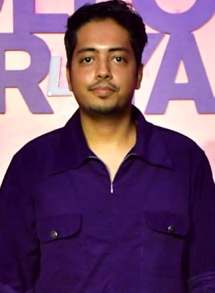
- Gupta in 2025
- Born: 5 January 1993 (age 33); Delhi, India
- Education: Bachelor of Commerce; University of Delhi
- Occupations: Comedian; YouTuber; Vlogger

YouTube information
- Channel: Aakash Gupta
- Genre: Comedy
- Subscribers: 4.5 million
- Views: 534million
- Last updated: 13 April 2025

Aakash Gupta is an Indian comic, actor, performer YouTuber and theatre artist. He was the co-winner of the second season of the stand-up comedy competition television series Comicstaan along with Suman Koirala and Samay Raina. He is trained in performing arts and sketch comedy. He has appeared in the Amazon Prime Video series LOL: Hasse Toh Phasse and the Netflix series Comedy Premium League.

== Early life ==
Born and raised in Delhi, Gupta did his schooling at Sumermal Jain Public School. Gupta attended Shaheed Bhagat Singh College at Delhi University graduating with a Bachelor in Commerce with Honours. He was first exposed to the theatre in college and where he was well known as a performer. He performed in several streets and stage plays in his college and also various other college fests such as Mood Indigo (IIT Bombay, IIT Delhi). In his final year, Gupta was the president of Natuve- The theatre society of Shaheed Bhagat Singh College. After graduation Gupta worked as an audit associate with KPMG for one year, while doing theatre on weekends with different groups in Delhi.

== Early career ==
Gupta eventually chose to quit his corporate job and to focus on learning different forms of theatre, while keeping up his work in comedy and improv. In 2014, he did an internship at Radio Mantra. Gupta further explored acting by undertaking professional training in Red Nose Clowning & Commedia dell'arte from Indian and German acting teachers.

After leaving KPMG, Gupta developed an interest in improv comedy and joined a comedy improv collective in Delhi in 2014, called Cueless Improv, under the guidance of Varoon Anand, Delhi's experienced improv trainer. Gupta continued learning improvised comedy and did multiple improv shows for two years with the group. In 2014, he began pursuing a career in stand-up comedy after performing at an open mic at Akshara Theatre in Delhi.

Around 2015, he started working with seasoned comic Nitin Gupta, as an actor and a co-writer, for Gupta's comedy network The Humour Beings for their comedy sketches.

Aakash finally released his first stand up video on YouTube in 2017 after three years of doing stand up. This video was recorded in the Mumbai venue, The Habitat (formerly known as Tuning Fork).

=== Stand-up ===
Gupta began pursuing a career in stand-up comedy after performing various improv shows. Gupta's national comedy tours began after the success of his first two stand-up videos titled: Train Journeys & Honeymoon Trips and Relationships, Clubbing & Cocktails with his stand-up solo titled Bhai Khush Raha Kar (Brother Stay Happy).

In 2018, Delhi Metro video released became a worldwide viral sensation and has been the highest watched video on the channel till date. When Aakash auditioned for Comicstaan 2 which aired on Amazon Prime Video he quickly become a popular contestant amongst audiences. He consistently received the highest scores in most episodes. His unique sketch comedic style landed him in the grand finale of the show and he ended up being the co-winner of Season 2 along with Samay Raina. After his new found fame from Comicstaan, Aakash started doing multiple shows across India and filled up auditoriums and college gigs.

=== YouTube ===
Aakash released a new stand-up video titled "Dogs" followed by "Sarojini Nagar" which again became trending on YouTube. "Sarojini Nagar" was one of the first Indian stand-up videos to trend at #1 on YouTube. This helped him cross 1 million subscribers on YouTube. He received his YouTube Silver Play Button on 11 September 2018 and his YouTube Gold Play Button on 22 July 2020. In 2022, he released a stand up video Paan, which trended #2 on YouTube in less than 12 hours after release.

=== OTT work ===
Gupta was a part of a comedy reality show on Amazon Prime video titled LOL: Hasse Toh Phasse along with Sunil Grover, Gaurav Gera, Kusha Kapila, Mallika Dua, Cyrus Broacha and more. In 2021, he appeared in the first season of Netflix's Comedy Premium League, carrying out debates and roasts. Gupta teamed up with Kenny Sebastian, Kaneez Surka, Prashasti Singh and they called themselves The Gharelu Gilehris (Homely Squirrels). Later in May 2021, he wrote, directed, and acted in sketches for the newly launched AVOD platform Amazon Mini TV. In 2022, Gupta played a lead role in the web series Couple Goals S3 which premiered on Amazon Mini TV.

== Personal life ==
Aakash keeps his personal life private on social media. He got married in October 2021. The wedding was attended by many famous comics and content creators. Stand-up comedian Gaurav Kapoor made a highly viewed vlog about the wedding.

== Filmography ==
Year	Title	Notes	Ref.
2015	Censorship - Ep. 1 - Gangs of Gaalipur	TheHumorBeings	
2015	Censorship - Ep. 2 - Jism Reloaded	TheHumorBeings	
2016	Ek Tha Restaurant	TheHumorBeings	
2016	Times of Intolerance	TheHumorBeings	
2019	Comicstaan 2	Co-Winner	
2021	Comedy Premium League	Top 3	
2021	LOL: Hasse Toh Phasse	Top 3	
2022	Couple Goals S3	Lead role	
