= Pushpavalli (TV series) =

- Genre: Comedy; Drama
- Created by: Sumukhi Suresh
- Directed by: Debbie Rao
- Creative director: Shani
- Country of origin: India
- Original languages: English, Hindi, Kannada, Tamil
- No. of seasons: 2
- No. of episodes: 16

Production
- Executive producer: Rohan Pujara
- Cinematography: Ankit Mhatre

Original release
- Network: Amazon Prime Video
- Release: 15 December 2017 – 12 March 2020

Pushpavalli is an Indian television comedy drama series created by Sumukhi Suresh. It is an Amazon Prime Video original series and premiered on 15 December 2017.

== Cast ==
- Sumukhi Suresh as Pushpavalli Parsuraman
- Manish Anand as Nikhil Rao
- Naveen Richard as Pankaj
- Ashok Pathak as T-Boy
- Preetika Chawla as Swati
- Latha Venkatraman as Amma
- Shraddha Jain as Vasu
- Urooj Ashfaq as Tara
- Sumaira Shaikh as Srishti
- Niharika Dutt as Pearl
- Kaavya Bector as Bhavna
- Sonali Thakkar as Saloni
- Rahul Subramanian as Lakshman
- Kumar Varun as Guruji
- Gaurav Kapoor as Raghav
- Kenny Sebastian as Vinencio
- Manoj Kumar Kalaivanan as Sangameshwaran
- Yasmin Sait as Nikhil's Mom
- Breshna Khan as Rehna
- Sharin Bhatti as Gauri
- Rahul Hota as Doctor
- Pooja Sampath as Girl at the Stand-up
- Shyam Gopal as Nikhil's Father
- Harminder Singh Alag as Arhaan
- Veera Saxena as Nazia
- Vipul Mathur as The helmet guy
- Shreeja Chaturvedi as The pregnant girl
- Kavea Chavali as Pop up Mom
- Srikant Maski as Chengappa
- Vidyuth Gargi as Vidyuth

== Episodes ==
=== Season 1 ===
No.	Title	Original release date
1	"Bhopal to Bangalore"	15 December 2017
2	"Eagle Attack"	15 December 2017
3	"Chutiya Chutney"	15 December 2017
4	"Sab Scam Hai"	15 December 2017
5	"Bitch is Back"	15 December 2017
6	"PCOD"	15 December 2017
7	"Finding Dukie"	15 December 2017
8	"Look at Me"	15 December 2017

=== Season 2 ===
No.	Title	Original release date
1	"Ab aap kya karengi"	12 March 2020
2	"Hai hai nagin"	12 March 2020
3	"Consignment ka date"	12 March 2020
4	"Khadda dekh ke khud hi gir gayin"	12 March 2020
5	"Hello Mr. Rao?"	12 March 2020
6	"Kaju!"	12 March 2020
7	"Gayi behen"	12 March 2020
8	"Badle ki aag"	12 March 2020

== Plot ==
Season 1: Pushpavalli is the story of a girl (named Pushpavalli) who meets a charming man, Nikhil Rao in an event in Bhopal. Nikhil who finds Pushpavalli cool and kind spends time with her, thinking she doesn't have many friends. While there is nothing between the two, Pushpavalli feels that Nikhil also likes her. Finding out that Nikhil is from Bangalore, she takes up a job in a children's library located close to Nikhil's office, which is run by one of her school friends named Pankaj. In Bangalore, she stays in a PG run by Vasu. She hires a tea vendor called T-Boy to stalk Nikhil and get all the information about his arrival back to India. In exchange she steals and shares the information from the contacts database of the library, to help for his upcoming CCTV camera business. What follows is a flurry of lies from Pushpavalli to get close to Nikhil without making it apparent to him. The show nears to an end with Nikhil finding out about and confronting it, and it concludes with Pushpavalli accessing visuals to Nikhil's house via a CCTV camera that the T-Boy has installed.

Season 2: The story continues with the premise of Pushpavalli's engagement with Vidyuth, a sweet, caring and considerate guy, who is Pushpavalli's mother's choice. The event is held in Bangalore where it is revealed that Pushpavalli wishes to take revenge on Nikhil for humiliating and rejecting her, enlisting T-Boy's help. She relocates to Bangalore on the pretext of spending time with her fiancé, and impressing his family, but ends up getting back her old job at Pankaj's library, where it is revealed that he and Swati are pursuing a relationship. She also starts living secretly in Vasu's PG, without the latter's knowledge, creating a new phase of challenges for her. The story continues as Pushpavalli furthers her saga of lies to regain Nikhil's trust and confidence in her, while simultaneously seeking vengeance and manoeuvring her oblivious fiancé and Pankaj away from her intentions.
