= One Mic Stand =

Standup comedy television series

- Directed by: Kreeti Gogia and Karan Asnani
- Presented by: Sapan Verma
- Country of origin: India
- Original languages: Hindi and English
- No. of seasons: 2
- No. of episodes: 10

Production
- Running time: 30 minutes
- Production company: Only Much Louder

Original release
- Network: Amazon Video
- Release: 15 November 2019

One Mic Stand is an Indian standup comedy television show series created by Only Much Louder for Amazon Prime Video. Unlike typical standup formats, the show hosts India's famous Actor, Politician, Internet personality, Writer, and Musician who are trained by Comedians to perform standup comedy for first time. This series has 2 seasons on Amazon Prime Video and both seasons are hosted by comedian Sapan Verma.

== Seasons ==
The first season of One Mic Stand released on 15 November 2019, with 5 episodes. Bhuvan Bam, Taapsee Pannu, Richa Chadha, Vishal Dadlani and Shashi Tharoor performed their first time ever standup comedy. Zakir Khan, Kunal Kamra, Ashish Shakya, Rohan Joshi and Angad Singh Ranyal were the mentors, trainers and the guest comedians in this season.

The second season released on 22 October 2021, again with 5 episodes. The celebrities who performed their first standup are Sunny Leone, Karan Johar, Chetan Bhagat, Faye D'Souza and Raftaar. The guest comedy and trainings were performed by Samay Raina, Neeti Palta, Sumukhi Suresh, Atul Khatri and Abish Mathew.

=== Season 1 ===
| Episode | Title | Celebrity | Guest Comedian |
|---|---|---|---|
| 1 | Bhuvan Bam ft. Zakir Khan | Bhuvan Bam | Zakir Khan |
| 2 | Taapsee Pannu ft. Angad Singh Ranyal | Taapsee Pannu | Angad Singh Ranyal |
| 3 | Richa Chadha ft. Ashish Shakya | Richa Chadha | Ashish Shakya |
| 4 | Vishal Dadlani ft. Rohan Joshi | Vishal Dadlani | Rohan Joshi |
| 5 | Shashi Tharoor ft. Kunal Kamra | Shashi Tharoor | Kunal Kamra |

=== Season 2 ===
| Episode | Title | Celebrity | Guest Comedian |
|---|---|---|---|
| 1 | Sunny Leone ft. Neeti Palta | Sunny Leone | Neeti Palta |
| 4 | Karan Johar ft. Sumukhi Suresh | Karan Johar | Sumukhi Suresh |
| 3 | Faye D'souza ft Atul Khatri | Faye D'Souza | Atul Khatri |
| 2 | Chetan Bhagat ft. Abish Mathew | Chetan Bhagat | Abish Mathew |
| 5 | Raftaar ft. Samay Raina | Raftaar | Samay Raina |

== German version ==
In 2022 Amazon Prime Germany and Leonine Studios created a German language version of the format. It is hosted by Teddy Teclebrhan and features professional comedians including Hazel Brugger and Harald Schmidt, and celebrities such as politician Karl Lauterbach, dancer Motsi Mabuse, and actor Fahri Yardim.
