= Comicstaan =

Indian television series (2018)

- Promotional poster
- Directed by: Khuzema Haveli
- Presented by: Abish Mathew (Season 1, 2 & 3); Sumukhi Suresh (Season 1); Urooj Ashfaq (Season 2); Kusha Kapila (Season 3)
- Judges: Tanmay Bhat; Kaneez Surka; Biswa Kalyan Rath; Kanan Gill; Kenny Sebastian; Naveen Richard; Zakir Khan; Sapan Verma; Sumukhi Suresh; Neeti Palta
- Country of origin: India (Multiverse)
- Original languages: English; Hindi; Tamil
- No. of seasons: 3
- No. of episodes: 25

Production
- Executive producers: Adit Tulsyan; Shweta Chavan
- Producers: Ajay Nair; Dhruv Sheth; Vikram Singh; Kreeti Gogia
- Production location: Mumbai
- Running time: 55–71 minutes
- Production company: Only Much Louder

Original release
- Network: Amazon Video
- Release: 13 July 2018 – present

Related
- Comicstaan Semma Comedy Pa

Comicstaan is an Indian stand-up comedy competition television series created by Only Much Louder for Amazon Prime Video. The show brings together budding Indian comedians to find the next big name in stand-up comedy.

The series premiere and three following episodes dropped on 13 July 2018. In its first week, Comicstaan became the most-watched show on Amazon Prime Video in India. The judges for Season 1 were Biswa Kalyan Rath, Tanmay Bhat, Sapan Verma, Kaneez Surka, Kanan Gill, Kenny Sebastian, and Naveen Richard and it was hosted by Abish Mathew and Sumukhi Suresh. The grand finale of Season 1 was released on 17 August 2018 and Nishant Suri, a contestant from Noida, emerged as the winner.

On 6 August 2018, Comicstaan was renewed for a second season. Comedian Zakir Khan was reported to be included in the lineup of judges and mentors for Season 2 with Sapan Verma and Naveen Richard not expected to return. Additionally, Tanmay Bhat was dropped from Season 2 on 14 November 2018, a month after he was ousted from All India Bakchod due to allegations of inaction against sexual harassment. Season 2 premiered on 12 July 2019 with the addition of judges Neeti Palta and Sumukhi Suresh (who co-hosted Season 1) as judges and mentors and Urooj Ashfaq joining as co-host.

Comicstaan Season 2 premiered on 12 July 2019 where it released its first three episodes along with one bonus episode. This season had Biswa Kalyan Rath, Kaneez Surka, Kanan Gill, Zakir Khan, Neeti Palta and Kenny Sebastian as judges.

The winner of Season 1 was Nishant Suri. Season 2 had combined winners namely Samay Raina and Aakash Gupta. The winner of Season 3 is Aashish Solanki with Gurleen Pannu coming as runner-up.

== Hosts and judges ==
Starring	Seasons		
Starring	1	2	3
Kanan Gill	Judge	Judge	Mentor
Kenny Sebastian	Judge	Judge	Judge
Sapan Verma	Judge		Mentor
Tanmay Bhat	Judge		
Naveen Richard	Judge	Guest	
Kaneez Surka	Judge	Judge	
Biswa Kalyan Rath	Judge	Judge	
Abish Mathew	Host	Host	Host
Sumukhi Suresh	Host	Judge	Judge
Prashasti Singh	Contestant		Mentor
Rahul Dua	Contestant		Guest Host
Zakir Khan		Judge	Judge
Neeti Palta		Judge	Judge
Urooj Ashfaq		Host	
Aakash Gupta		Contestant	Guest Host
Kusha Kapila			Host
Aadar Malik			Mentor
Anu Menon			Mentor
Rahul Subramanian			Mentor
Rohan Joshi			Mentor

== Series overview ==
Season	Premiere date	Finale date	Winner(s)	Runner-up	No. of contestants	Winner's prizes
1	13 July 2018		Nishant Suri	Rahul Dua	10	A cash prize of ₹10,00,000
2	12 July 2019	16 August 2019	Aakash Gupta; Samay Raina	Raunaq Rajani	10	A cash prize of ₹10,00,000
Tamil 1	10 September 2020		Abishek Kumar	Syama Harini	6	A cash prize of ₹10,00,000
3	15 July 2022		Aashish Solanki	Gurleen Pannu	8	Winner gets a cash prize of ₹20,00,000; Runner-up gets a cash prize of ₹10,00,000

== Selection process and format ==
=== Season 1 ===
In September and October 2017, auditions for Season 1 took place in Mumbai, New Delhi, and Bangalore in the form of open mics. No contestants were chosen on the spot; videos of their performances were viewed by all judges and hosts together before they decided on the best 10.

During the course of the shows, the 10 contestants went through 7 rounds of performances in order to secure a spot in the grand finale. Each round, the contestants performed in a different genre of comedy and, unlike most competition television series, there were no eliminations till the last round. Comedic genres the contestants performed in included anecdotal, topical, observational, improv, sketch, comedy of terrors, and alternative comedy.

Before each round, the contestants were mentored in each genre by one of the judges, who is touted as the expert of that specific type of comedy. The contestants had a week to prepare fresh material and practice before performing that set live in front of an audience and the judges. After their performance, each contestant was given a score, between 1 and 10, by both the audience and all the judges (except for the expert for that round). Each contestant was given feedback by the judges before revealing their score. Two separate scores were revealed to each contestant – an average of the audience's score and an average of the judges'. The mean of both scores became the final score of the round for each contestant. The finals scores were aggregated each round and, at the end of the 7th round, 5 contestants receiving the best aggregate scores were given places in the finale.

For round 4 (improv), the 10 contestants were separated into 2 groups of 5. Each team was scored and their team's score also became the contestant's individual score. For round 5 (sketch), the contestants were paired up and there were 5 performances. Similarly to round 4, each pair was scored, which then became both contestants' individual scores. Aggregates of the points received by all performers each round were given to the mentor of that week. The best mentor was revealed in the grand finale and Naveen Richard came first and Kaneez Surka and Kenny Sebastian were first and second runners-up, respectively.

For the grand finale, the top 5 contestants performed in the Royal Opera House, Mumbai on 20 December 2017. They were allowed to perform in any of the 7 forms of comedy they were mentored in, including a combination of them. They were scored in a similar process as the previous rounds however, the scores were not aggregated with their previous scores. At the end, Nishant Suri, the contestant with the highest score, won the competition along with prize money of ₹10,00,000.

=== Season 2 ===
On 10 October 2018, auditions for Season 2 took place. This year the top 22 applicants auditioned for the judges in Mumbai itself on the main Comicstaan set. Applicants had to submit an application to the Comicstaan website and then the shortlisted few (around 100 people) met with producers and submitted themselves for vigorous background checks. The top few were invited to Mumbai to audition for the judges. The judges debated and scored the top 22 and based on an 8-hour gruelling debate session, they select the top 10 contestants.

During the shows, the 10 contestants went through 7 rounds of performances to secure a spot in the grand finale. Each round, the contestants performed in a different genre of comedy and, unlike most competition television series, there were no eliminations till the last round. Comedic genres the contestants performed in included anecdotal, topical, observational, improv, sketch, comedy of terrors, and alternative comedy.

Before each round, the contestants were mentored in each genre by one of the judges, who is touted as the expert of that specific type of comedy. The contestants had a week to prepare fresh material and practice before performing that set live in front of an audience and the judges. After their performance, each contestant was given a score between 1 and 10, by both the audience and all the judges (except for the expert for that round). Each contestant was given feedback by the judges before revealing their score. Two separate scores were revealed to each contestant – an average of the audience's score and an average of the judges'. The mean of both scores became the final score of the round for each contestant. The final scores were aggregated each round and at the end of the 7th round, 5 contestants receiving the best aggregate scores were given places in the finale.

For the grand finale, the top 5 contestants perform in any of the 7 forms of comedy they were mentored in, including a combination of them. They are scored in a similar process however, the scores were not aggregated with their previous scores. In the end, the highest scorer wins the competition along with prize money of ₹10,00,000.

== Contestants ==
=== Season 1 ===
- Nishant Suri (Noida, Uttar Pradesh) – Winner
- Rahul Dua (Ludhiana, Punjab) – Runner-up
- Prashasti Singh (Amethi, Uttar Pradesh) – 2nd runner-up
- Shankar Chugani (Coonoor, Tamil Nadu)
- Rueben Kaduskar (Mumbai, Maharashtra)
- Shashwat Maheshwari (Kanpur, Uttar Pradesh)
- Saurav Mehta (Kolkata, West Bengal)
- Arnav Rao (Chennai, Tamil Nadu)
- Aishwarya Mohanraj (Mumbai, Maharashtra)
- Sejal Bhat (Bengaluru, Karnataka)

=== Season 2 ===
- Samay Raina (Jammu and Kashmir) – Winner
- Aakash Gupta (New Delhi) – Winner
- Raunaq Rajani (Mumbai, Maharashtra) – Runner-up
- Joel D’souza (Mumbai, Maharashtra)
- Rohan Gujral (Mumbai, Maharashtra)
- Supriya Joshi (Mumbai, Maharashtra)
- Shreeja Chaturvedi (Mumbai, Maharashtra)
- Ramya Ramapriya (Bengaluru, Karnataka)
- Devanshi Shah (Mumbai, Maharashtra)
- Sumit Sourav (Jamshedpur, Jharkhand)

=== Season 3 ===
- Aashish Solanki (New Delhi) – Winner
- Gurleen Pannu (Chandigarh) – Runner-up
- Aman Jotwani (Mumbai, Maharashtra) – 2nd runner-up
- Adesh Nichit (Baghpat, Uttar Pradesh)
- Shreya Priyam (Patna, Bihar)
- Natiq Hasan (New Delhi)
- Shamik Chakrabarti (Bengaluru, Karnataka)
- Pavitra Shetty (Mumbai, Maharashtra)

== Summary ==
=== Season 1 ===
Episode –	1 (Auditions)	2	3	4	5	6	7	8	2–8 (Total Score)	9 (Grand Finale)	
Genre	none	Anecdotal	Topical	Observational	Improvisational	Sketch	Terrors	Alternative	none		
Mentor	none	Biswa	Tanmay	Sapan	Kaneez	Naveen	Kanan	Kenny	none		
Mentor Score	none	70.8	79	78	80	83.6	75.2	79.8	none		
Nishant	6.6	7	7.5	8.6	8.2 (8.6+8.8+7.3=24.7)	9.4 (Paired with Shashwat)	7	9.8*	56.9	9.2	Winner
Rahul	7.5	6.5	8	8.5	7.4+1=8.4 (6.2+7.7+8.2=22.1)	9.2 (Paired with Prashashti)	9	8.8*	58.2	8.4	Runner-up
Prashashti	8.3	7.8	7.4	6.5	8.2+1=9.2 (8.6+8.8+7.3=24.7)	9.2 (Paired with Rahul)	8.4	9.5*	57.5	7.9	2nd Runner-up
Saurav	7.7	7	9	8.2	7.4 (6.2+7.7+8.2=22.1)	7.2 (Paired with Rueben)	7.8	9*	55.2	7.8	4th place
Shankar	9.1	7.8	7.4	8.9	8.2 (8.6+8.8+7.3=24.7)	8 (Paired with Arnav)	8.4	6.5*	54.7	7.6	5th place
Shashwat	8.3	6.6	8	8.5	8.2 (8.6+8.8+7.3=24.7)	9.4 (Paired with Nishant)	7.2	7*	54.6	Eliminated	
Aishwarya	6.4	7.2	7.6	7.6	7.4 (6.2+7.7+8.2=22.1)	8 (Paired with Sejal)	7	10*	54.2	Eliminated	
Rueben	5.9	7.3	8.4	6.4	8.2 (8.6+8.8+7.3=24.7)	7.2 (Paired with Saurav)	7.8	8.7*	53.5	Eliminated	
Sejal	9.4	7.6	8	8.6	7.4 (6.2+7.7+8.2=22.1)	8 (Paired with Aishwarya)	6.2	7.2*	52.6	Eliminated	
Arnav	5.3	6	7.7	6.2	7.4 (6.2+7.7+8.2=22.1)	8 (Paired with Shankar)	6.4	7.5*	49	Eliminated	
Eliminated/ Final Result	none								Arnav	Shankar	
Eliminated/ Final Result	none								Sejal	Saurav	
Eliminated/ Final Result	none								Rueben	Prashashti	
Eliminated/ Final Result	none								Aishwarya	Rahul	
Eliminated/ Final Result	none								Shashwat	Nishant	
Mentor Winners	none									Kenny	
Mentor Winners	none									Kaneez	
Mentor Winners	none									Naveen	

Team Bananas
Team Ek Sithaphal
Red numbers Lowest Score
Green numbers Highest Score
Note (*): This episode score is excluding the Audience's Average Score and only Judges' Average Score.
Eliminated
Winner
Runner-Up
2nd Runner-Up

=== Season 2 ===
Episode –	1	2	3	4	5	6	7	1–7 (Total Score)	8 (Grand Finale)	
Genre	Observational	Anecdotal	Improv	Topical	Sketch	Terrors	Alternative	none		
Mentor	Kanan	Zakir	Kaneez	Neeti	Sumukhi	Biswa	Kenny	none		
Mentor Score	79.1	78.7	80.5	81.1	77.2	78.4	84.5	none		
Aakash	9.5	8.6	7.8 (7.2+8.1+8.1=23.4)	9.6	7.9 (Paired with Devanshi)	9.5	8.8*	60.9	9.1	Winner
Samay	8.9	9.4	8.3 (7.7+8.4+8.9=25)	7.7	6.6 (Paired with Joel)	8.2	8.7*	57.6	9.1	Winner
Raunaq	8.6	8	8.3 (7.7+8.4+8.9=25)	8.9	8.4 (Paired with Ramya)	8.9	8.3*	59.7	8.1	3rd place
Sumit	7.8	7.4	8.3 (7.7+8.4+8.9=25)	8.9	9.2 (Paired with Rohan)	6.3	8.5*	56.3	8	4th place
Supriya	8.1	7.6	7.8 (7.2+8.1+8.1=23.4)	8	6.5 (Paired with Shreeja)	9	9.8*	56.5	6.5	5th place
Rohan	7.6	6.5	8.3 (7.7+8.4+8.9=25)	8.2	9.2 (Paired with Sumit)	7	8.8*	55.6	Eliminated	
Ramya	7.1	8.5	7.8 (7.2+8.1+8.1=23.4)	7.4	8.4 (Paired with Raunaq)	7.2	7.3*	53.7	Eliminated	
Joel	7	8.7	7.8 (7.2+8.1+8.1=23.4)	8.5	6.6 (Paired with Samay)	7.3	7.3*	53.2	Eliminated	
Devanshi	5.9	7.4	8.3 (7.7+8.4+8.9=25)	6.7	7.9 (Paired with Aakash)	6.6	9.7*	52.5	Eliminated	
Shreeja	8.6	6.6	7.8 (7.2+8.1+8.1=23.4)	7.2	6.5 (Paired with Supriya)	8.4	7.3*	52.4	Eliminated	
Eliminated/ Final Result	none							Shreeja	Supriya	
Eliminated/ Final Result	none							Devanshi	Sumit	
Eliminated/ Final Result	none							Joel	Raunaq	
Eliminated/ Final Result	none							Ramya	Aakash	
Eliminated/ Final Result	none							Rohan	Samay	
Most Unexceptional Mentor	none								Kenny	

Team Kadak Khopdis (English Translation: Hard Headed)
Team Lazy Lakadbagghey (English Translation: Lazy Hyenas)
Red numbers Lowest Score
Green numbers Highest Score
Note (*): This episode score is excluding the Audience's Average Score and only Judges' Average Score.
Eliminated
Winner
3rd Place
4th Place

=== Season 3 ===
Episode –	1	2	3	4	5	6	7	1–7 (Total Score)	8 (Grand Finale)	
Genre	Anecdotal	Topical	Improv	Sketch	Roast	Observational	Alternative	none		
Mentor	Rahul Subramanian	Sapan Verma	Aadar Malik	Anu Menon	Rohan Joshi	Prashathi Singh	Kanan Gill	none		
Mentor's choice	Aman	Shamik	Shreya	Shreya	Adesh	Aman	Shreya	none		
Aashish	8.6	8.4	8 (8+7.9+8.1=24)	9 (Paired with Aman)	9.2	8.4	8.3*	60.1	(Mentors: 10; Audience: 8.9); 9.6-0.5=9.1	Winner
Gurleen	8.5	9	7.9 (6.9+8.1+8.8=23.8)	9.5 (Paired with Shreya)	9.7	9.7	8.5*	62.6	(Audience: 8.1; Mentors: 9.3); 8.8	Runner-up
Aman	8.1-0.5=7.6+0.5=8.1	7.5	7.9 (6.9+8.1+8.8=23.8)	9 (Paired with Aashish)	8.8	8.9+0.5=9.4	8.8*	59.1	(Audience: 8.1); 8.5	3rd place
Shreya	6.9-0.5=6.4	8.3	8+0.5=8.5 (8+7.9+8.1=24)	9.5+0.5=10 (Paired with Gurleen)	7.2	8.6	9.5*+0.5=10	58.9	(Mentors: 8.5); 7.6	4th place
Adesh	8.1	7.8	8 (8+7.9+8.1=24)	7.7 (Paired with Natiq)	8.5+0.5=9	8.2	10*	58.7	Eliminated	
Shamik	8.6	7.7+0.5=8.2	7.9 (6.9+8.1+8.8=23.8)	7 (Paired with Pavitra)	9.2	8.3	8.3*	57.5	Eliminated	
Pavitra	8.3	8.6	7.9 (6.9+8.1+8.8=23.8)	7 (Paired with Shamik)	8.3	8.8	8.3*	57.2	Eliminated	
Natiq	8.5-0.5=8	6.6	8 (8+7.9+8.1=24)	7.7 (Paired with Adesh)	8.4	6.9	8*	53.6	Eliminated	
Comedians went Overtime	Aman; Natiq; Shreya	none							Aashish; Shreya	
Eliminated/ Final Result	none							Natiq	Shreya	
Eliminated/ Final Result	none							Pavitra	Aman	
Eliminated/ Final Result	none							Shamik	Gurleen	
Eliminated/ Final Result	none							Adesh	Aashish	

Team Lallupops
Team Bubblugums
Red numbers Lowest Score
Green numbers Highest Score
Maroon numbers Over-time Minus Score
Purple numbers Mentor's choice to give +0.5 Score
Note (*): This episode score is excluding the Audience's Average Score and only Judges' Average Score.
Eliminated
Winner
Runner-Up
3rd Place

== Comicstaan Semma Comedy Pa (Tamil) ==
=== Selection process and format ===
After two seasons in Hindi, Comicstaan has expanded in Tamil language. In 2019, auditions took place, applicants had to submit an application to the comicstaan website and then the shortlisted few met with producers and submitted themselves for vigorous background checks. Then top 6 contestants were selected.

During the shows, the 6 contestants went through 7 rounds of performances to secure a spot in the grand finale. Each round, the contestants performed in a different genre of comedy and, unlike most competition television series, there were no eliminations till the last round. Comedic genres the contestants performed in included anecdotal, topical, observational, sketch, comedy of terror and character work.

Before each round, the contestants were mentored in each genre by one of the judges, who is touted as the expert of that specific type of comedy. The contestants had a week to prepare fresh material and practice before performing that set live in front of an audience and the judges. After their performance, each contestant was given a score between 1 and 10, by both the audience and all the judges (except for the expert for that round). Each contestant was given feedback by the judges before revealing their score. Two separate scores were revealed to each contestant – an average of the audience's score and an average of the judges'. The mean of both scores became the final score of the round for each contestant. The final scores were aggregated each round and at the end of the 7th round, 3 contestants receiving the best aggregate scores were given places in the finale.

For the grand finale, the top 3 contestants perform in any of the 7 forms of comedy they were mentored in, including a combination of them. They are scored in a similar process however, the scores were not aggregated with their previous scores. In the end, the highest scorer wins the competition along with prize money of ₹10,00,000.

=== Hosts and Judges ===
Starring	Season
Starring	1
Current
Karthik Kumar	Judge
Rajmohan Arumugam	Judge
Praveen Kumar	Judge
Vidyullekha Raman	Host
Mervyn Rozz	Host

=== Contestants ===
- Mayandi Karunanithi
- Karthigeyan Durai
- Syama Harini
- Yogesh Jagannathan
- Abishek Kumar
- Annamalai Lakshmanan

=== Summary ===
Episode –	1 (Introduction)	2	3	4	5	6	7	1–7 (Total Score)	8 (Grand Finale)	
Genre	none	Observational	Topical	Sketch	Anecdotal	Terrors	Character Work	none		
Mentor	none	Praveen	Karthik	Rajmohan	Praveen	Karthik	Rajmohan	none		
Abishek	7.9	8.1	9	9.5 (Paired with Mayandi)	9.2	9.4	10*	62.7	9.5	Winner
Syama	9.1	9.2	8.5	7.1 (Paired with Annamalai)	9.3	7.6	9.7*	60	9	1st Runner-up
Yogesh	8.2	9	6.9	8.4 (Paired with Karthigeyan)	9.1	8.5	9*	58.4	7	2nd Runner-up
Mayandi	6.9	7.3	9.1	9.5 (Paired with Abishek)	8.4	8.5	9*	58.3	Eliminated	
Karthigeyan	8.1	8.5	8.2	8.4 (Paired with Yogesh)	7.6	7.7	10*	57	Eliminated	
Annamalai	7.3	7	6.1	7.1 (Paired with Syama)	7.5	9.4	7.7*	50	Eliminated	
Eliminated/ Final Result	none							Mayandi	Yogesh	
Eliminated/ Final Result	none							Karthigeyan	Syama	
Eliminated/ Final Result	none							Annamalai	Abishek	

Red numbers Lowest Score
Green numbers Highest Score
Note (*): This episode score is excluding the Audience's Average Score and only Judges' Average Score.
Eliminated
Winner
1st Runner-up
2nd Runner-up
