= Comedy Premium League =

Standup comedy television series

- Directed by: Sakshi Khanna
- Presented by: Prajakta Koli
- Country of origin: India
- Original languages: Hindi and English
- No. of seasons: 1
- No. of episodes: 6

Production
- Running time: 45 minutes
- Production company: Only Much Louder

Original release
- Network: Netflix
- Release: 20 August 2021

Comedy Premium League is an Indian Hindi-language Netflix "reality-meets-stand-up-meets-variety show" series produced by OML Entertainment and directed by Sakshi Khanna, Prajakta Koli hosts sixteen Indian comics who compete in four different teams. Four 45-minute episodes were available on Netflix on 20 August 2021, while the final two episodes streamed on 27 August 2021.

== Teams ==
The sixteen comedians were split into four teams with a captain for each team. According to Rohan Joshi, each team in balanced so that it had an actor, a writer and someone who could sing.

The teams compete in various formats, including standup, "In Slide" (sketch comedy), "Tu Tu Main Main" (debate), presentation, and roasts. Shot during the COVID-19 pandemic in India, they are voted on by a masked-up, socially distanced audience with the results put on a scoreboard, with points for performance and participation points if they stayed on time. The final episode featured a special appearance by filmmaker Anurag Kashyap.

=== Naazuk Nevles ===
- Mallika Dua (captain)
- Rahul Dua
- Urooj Ashfaq
- Rahul Subramanian

=== Lovable Langoors ===
- Amit Tandon (captain)
- Aadar Malik
- Samay Raina
- Rytasha Rathod

=== IDGAF Iguanas ===
- Sumukhi Suresh (captain)
- Tanmay Bhat
- Rohan Joshi
- Sumaira Shaikh

=== Gharelu Gilaharis ===
- Kenny Sebastian (captain)
- Aakash Gupta
- Prashasti Singh
- Kaneez Surka

== Reception ==
The show had moderate to positive reviews. GlamSham gave a largely positive review, reflecting on the "honesty" of host Koli calling them "India's 16 biggest comics – at least those who were available" and saying that the best thing is that the series "lets the comics explore a wide range, from team work to solo performances." The Second Angle called the first four episodes "a decent way to spend your time," finding the scoring complicated and the audience result nonsensical, but said the series ultimately had just moments of laughter "relevant only when the audience is aware of the niche that these comedians work in."

Ektaa Malia of The Indian Express rated the first four episodes 3 stars, calling the series "the closest [Indians] will get to having our very own Saturday Night Live." Pratikshya Mishra of The Quint rated it 2.5/5.0, finding the format problematic, saying it "cages the performers," and noted that "the interactions (especially the banter) between the comics off-stage is sometimes funnier than the performances." Shilajit Mitra of Cinema Express rated it 2/5, calling the timing and jokes "all too precise," but ultimately critical that there were no big laughs.
