= Sagar Shah =

Indian chess player and YouTuber (born 1990)

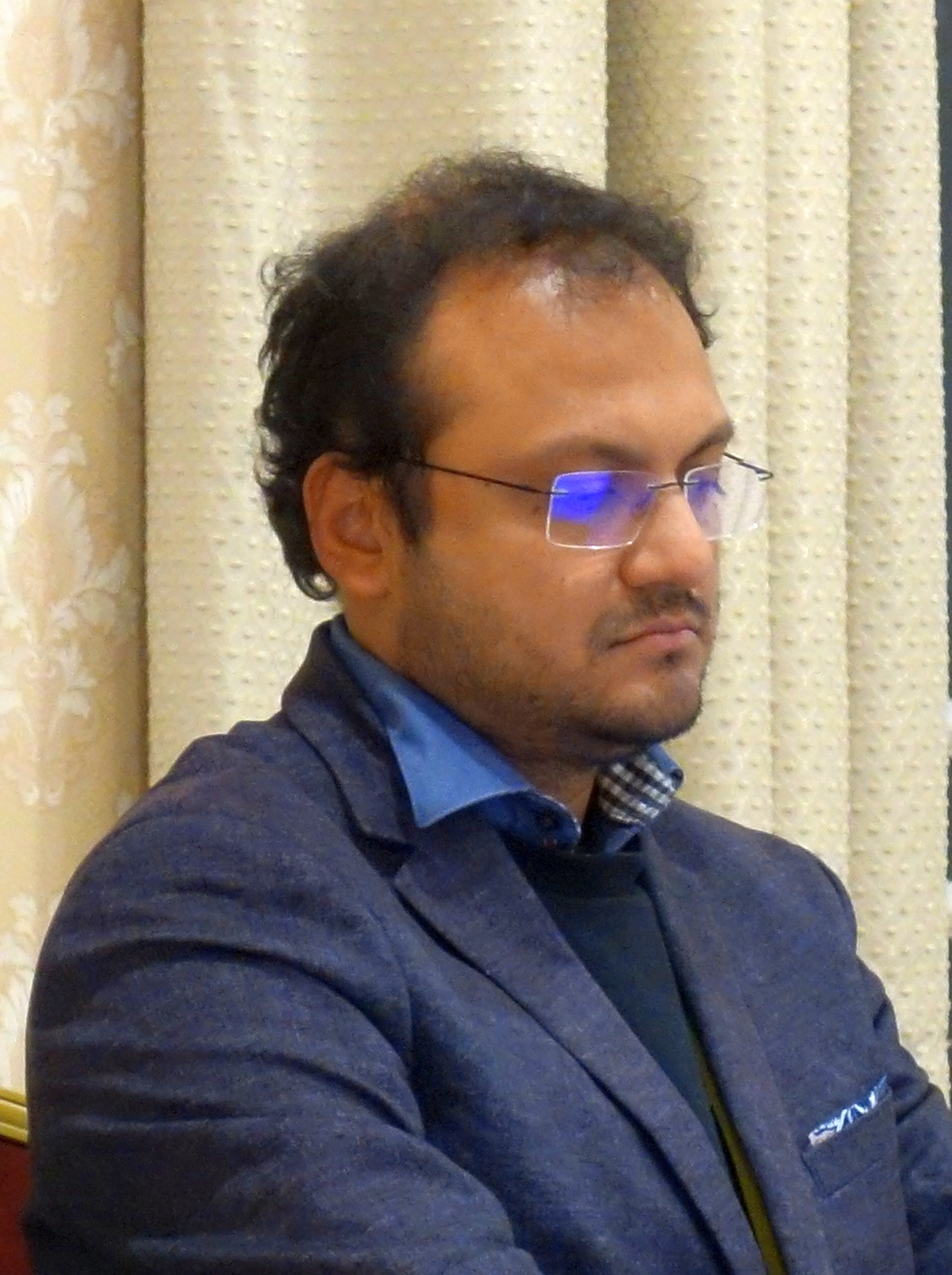
- Shah in 2023
- Born: 28 January 1990 (age 36); Mumbai, India
- Spouse: Amruta Mokal (m. 2014)
- Chess career
- Country: India
- Title: International Master (2014)
- FIDE rating: 2407 (September 2026)
- Peak rating: 2468 (September 2014)

YouTube information
- Channel: ChessBase India
- Years active: 2012–present
- Genres: Chess, Streaming
- Subscribers: 2.9 million
- Views: 3.2 billion
- Last updated: 28 Jan 2026
- Website: www.chessbase.in

Sagar Shah (born 28 January 1990) is an Indian chess player, journalist, commentator, and YouTuber who holds the title of International Master (IM).

He co-founded ChessBase India in late 2015 with his wife Amruta Mokal, who he married 5 February 2014. Professionally a chartered accountant, Shah has a peak FIDE rating of 2468 with two Grandmaster (GM) norms. He was awarded the Shiv Chhatrapati Award in 2014. In 2020, Shah and his longtime collaborator, Samay Raina, started streaming chess on YouTube. He started teaching chess to a group of comedians on stream. The duo have greatly contributed to the chess boom in India. They also organized team tournaments like the Chess Super League, in which top chess players such as Gukesh Dommaraju, Hikaru Nakamura, Anish Giri, Humpy Koneru and many others participated.
