= Alma Matters: Inside the IIT Dream =

2021 Netflix docu-series

- Genre: Documentary
- Created by: Prashant Raj
- Directed by: Pratik Patra; Prashant Raj
- Starring: Shubham Agarwal; Kevin Banker; Lokesh Deshmukh; Mukul Sankule; Adarsh Upadhyay; Kumar Gaurav
- Country of origin: India
- Original language: Hindi
- No. of seasons: 1
- No. of episodes: 3

Production
- Production location: India
- Production companies: Dopamine Media and Entertainment

Original release
- Network: Netflix
- Release: 15 May 2021

Alma Matters: Inside the IIT Dream is an Indian documentary web series that is directed by Pratik Patra and Prashant Raj, produced by Dopamine Media and Entertainment. The series starred Shubham Agarwal, Kevin Banker, Lokesh Deshmukh, Mukul Sankule, Adarsh Upadhyay, Kumar Gaurav and many more.

== Cast ==
- Shubham Agarwal
- Kevin Banker
- Lokesh Deshmukh
- Mukul Sankule
- Kartikeya Singh
- Adarsh Upadhyay
- Kumar Gaurav
- Gaurav Katam
- Biswa Kalyan Rath
- Spandana Silla

== Release ==
The series trailer was released on 24 April 2021 and it was released on 15 May 2021 and the series is available on Netflix.

== Review ==
The Hindu wrote The three-part series on life inside the hallowed halls of India’s premier educational institution fails to probe into the true nature of the students’ experience
