= Erik Follestad Johansen =

Norwegian ice hockey player Podcast Host, TV-personality

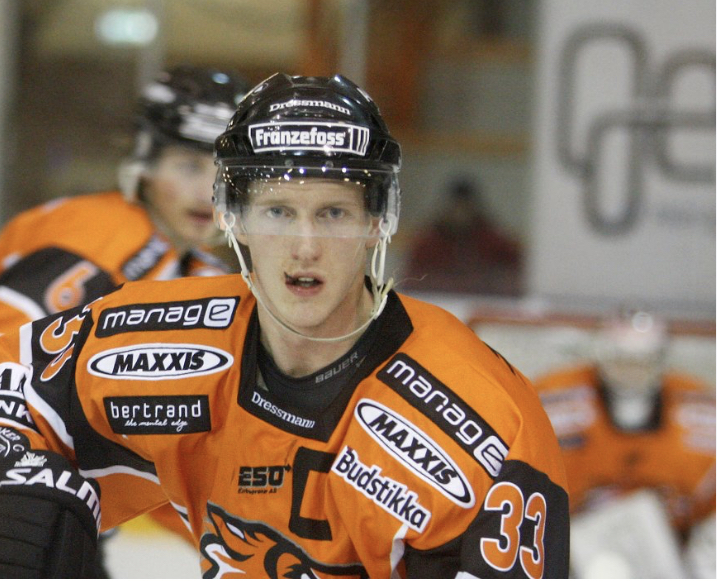
- Born: 22 June 1989 (age 37) Asker, Norway
- Height: 6 ft 2 in (188 cm)
- Weight: 181 lb (82 kg; 12 st 13 lb)
- Position: Defence
- Shot: Left
- GET-ligaen team Former teams: Vålerenga; Frisk Asker
- National team: Norway
- NHL draft: Undrafted
- Playing career: 2007–2016

Erik Follestad Johansen (born 22 June 1989) is a former Norwegian professional ice hockey defenceman who has played for Vålerenga in Norway's GET-ligaen.

He is participating at the 2011 IIHF World Championship as a member of the Norway men's national ice hockey team.

In 2023, he became an actor and played his brother Jens Follestad in the television series Innebandykrigerne (2023). He also starred in Så var det jul igjen.
