= Chess Super League =

Online Chess Tournament

- Game: Chess
- Founded: 2021
- Owners: Samay Raina, ChessBase India, Nodwin Gaming
- No. of teams: 6
- Venue: Chess.com (online)

Chess Super League is an online chess tournament organized by Samay Raina, ChessBase India, Nodwin Gaming. Players in the tournament, consist of some of the Top International Grandmasters, Indian Grandmasters, International Masters and Indian Junior Players, which are grouped into 6 teams. The first iteration of the tournament kicked off on 11 October 2021 on chess.com, with a prize fund of ₹40 lakh (US$42,000). The entire event was streamed on Samay Raina's YouTube Channel.

== Format ==
The games will be played with a time control of 15 minutes plus a 10-second increment. The first five days will see a league stage with different pools, from which the top four teams will qualify for the playoffs.

The teams that finish first and second will play Qualifier 1, and the teams that finish 3 and 4 will play the Eliminator 1. Eliminator 2 consists of the loser of Qualifier 1 against the winner of Eliminator 1. The winner of Eliminator 2 goes to the finals to face off with the winner of Qualifier 1.

== Teams (Season 1) ==
The players are six top grandmasters (male and female), six top players from India (male and female), and six top Indian juniors (boys and girls). One player from each of these 6 brackets are clubbed into a team, leading to a total of 6 teams that will be spearheaded by franchise owners who will support and represent their squad throughout the league.

Season 1 Teams

Pivotal Pawns
Owner	Zakir Khan
Board 1	Ding Liren
Board 2	Abhijeet Gupta
Board 3	Zhansaya Abdumalik
Board 4	Bhakti Kulkarni
Board 5	Arjun Kalyan
Board 6	Savitha Shri B

The Kingslayers
Owner	Tanmay Bhat
Board 1	Anish Giri
Board 2	S. P. Sethuraman
Board 3	Nana Dzagnidze
Board 4	Soumya Swaminathan
Board 5	Gukesh D
Board 6	Arpita Mukherjee

Ruthless Rooks
Owner	Mortal (S8UL Esports)
Board 1	Teimour Radjabov
Board 2	Karthikeyan Murali
Board 3	Anna Muzychuk
Board 4	Harika Dronavalli
Board 5	Harshit Raja
Board 6	Saina Salonika

Krazy Knights
Owner	Biswa Kalyan Rath
Board 1	Hikaru Nakamura
Board 2	Krishnan Sasikiran
Board 3	Mariya Muzychuk
Board 4	Mary Ann Gomes
Board 5	Aryan Chopra
Board 6	Mrudul Dehankar

Quintessential Queens
Owner	Suhani Shah & Saina Nehwal
Board 1	Sergey Karjakin
Board 2	Koneru Humpy
Board 3	Hou Yifan
Board 4	Tania Sachdev
Board 5	P. Iniyan
Board 6	Priyanka K

Brutal Bishops
Owner	Raftaar
Board 1	Wang Hao
Board 2	Vidit Gujrathi
Board 3	Alexandra Kosteniuk
Board 4	Eesha Karavade
Board 5	Raunak Sadhwani
Board 6	Tarini Goyal

== Results (Season 1) ==
The first season was won by Zakir Khan's Pivotal Pawns at an Armageddon clash against Tanmay Bhat's Kingslayers on 17 October 2021. The finals saw a two round event with round 1 being won by The Kingslayers and Round 2 being won by Pivotal Pawns, to force a tie break between Zhansaya Abdumalik and Nana Dzagnidze which was won by the former.

== Controversies ==
The first season saw massive controversies being sparked.

In one of the matches, a draw was offered by Vidit Gujrathi, before move 40, which was, according to rule-book, illegal, and thus, the arbitrators awarded the win to his opponent, which sparked rage from Vidit's end for not receiving any warning.

In another instance, Hikaru Nakamura, a player in the tournament, used his phone during the game, which was deemed by the arbitrators as a use of external aid, and thus, deemed illegal, with a win being awarded to his opponent. Hikaru Nakamura, in another instance, was playing Chess.com's Titled Tuesday and Chess Super League's matches simultaneously, which was, according to the viewers, unethical for his team, and his opponent. He and his team, would later lose the matchup, which might have been a crucial turning point.
