= Amit Bhadana =

Indian YouTuber (born 1994)

- Bhadana in 2019
- Born: 7 September 1994 (age 32); Bulandshahr, Uttar Pradesh, India
- Education: Delhi University (LL.B)
- Occupation: YouTuber

YouTube information
- Channel: Amit Bhadana
- Years active: 2017—present
- Genre: Comedy
- Subscribers: 24.4 million
- Views: 2.87 billion
- Last updated: 10 January 2026

Amit Bhadana (pronounced [əˈmɪt bʱəɽaːna]) (born 7 September 1994) is an Indian comedian, writer, actor, director, and YouTuber, from Delhi, India. He started creating Hindi language comedy videos in 2017 and was the first Indian YouTuber to hit 20 million subscribers.

== Early life and education ==
Amit Bhadana was born on 7 September 1994 in Bulandshahr, Uttar Pradesh. Later his family moved to Johri Pur, Delhi. He graduated from the University of Delhi, as a law graduate.

== Career ==
Amit started his YouTube channel in October 2017 after initially uploaded videos of his dubbing and mimicry performances on Facebook starting 2016. However, his breakthrough came in 2017 when he uploaded a comedy video titled "Exam Be Like," which went viral and garnered millions of views. Since then, Amit Bhadana has become one of the most popular YouTubers in India. Bhadana's humour videos involve parodies of his friends and relatives, and their relationships. He has also published music videos, including a dub of a song by Eminem, and a reply to the song "Hello" by the artist Adele. In 2021, he released the song "Father Saab", dedicated to the memory of his father.

One of his videos was featured on YouTube's 2018 Global Top 10 Videos list. On 5 May 2023, Bhadana stated that his channel has 24.4 million subscribers. In December 2020, esports and mobile gaming platform Mobile Premier League appointed Bhadana as their brand ambassador.

Bhadana writes and performs his sketches in Hindi, and has a marketing team overseeing his content and working to increase his audience. DNA India included him in a list of the wealthiest Indian YouTubers in 2021.

== Filmography ==
=== Series ===
Year	Title	Season(s)	Ref(s)
2020	Bitiya Rani		
2021	Berozgaar Bachelors		
2022	LLB		
2023	Bahut Scope Hai		
2023	Bakra Nahi Majnu Halaal	2	
2023	SSC		

=== Short films ===
List of short film credits
Year	Title	Role	Ref.
2021	Amit Ki Varsha		
2022	Chidiya Ghar		
2022	Paggal		
2022	Mera Junior		
2022	The Perfect Date		
2023	Sarkari Vidyalaya U Turn		
2023	Bhadana Ji Going Sasural		
2023	Gaon ka Yuva Neta		
2024	Joker		
2024	Office Romance		
2024	Sipahi		

=== Music videos ===
Year	Title	Singer(s)	Lyricist(s)	Story	Ref.
2019	Parichay	Ikka	Ikka/Amit Bhadana	Amit Bhadana	
2021	Father Saab	King		Amit Bhadana	
2021	Aatmvishvas	Badshah		Amit Bhadana	
2023	Legacy	Bintu Pabra	KP Kundu, Bintu Pabra, Amit Bhadana	Amit Bhadana	

== See also ==
- List of YouTubers
- List of Indian comedians
