= Rahul Dua =

Indian stand-up comedian

- Born: Haldwani, Uttarakhand, India
- Education: (B.Tech) Thapar Institute of Engineering and Technology (M.B.A) Faculty of Management Studies – University of Delhi
- Occupations: Actor, writer, comedian, Youtuber
- Organization: Oriole Entertainment
- Website: orioleentertainment.com

Rahul Dua is an Indian stand-up comedian, actor, writer, YouTuber, and host. Dua gained recognition through his participation in the show Comicstaan.

== Early life ==
Dua was born in 1992. He completed his schooling in his hometown before pursuing a Bachelor of Technology degree in Electronics and Communications Engineering at Thapar Institute of Engineering and Technology in Patiala. Later, he completed his MBA degree from the prestigious Faculty of Management Studies-University of Delhi (FMS) in Delhi. Rahul specialised in Finance and Marketing during his MBA.

== Career ==
Dua was named one of India's top 16 comedians in Netflix's Comedy Premium League. Additionally, he emerged as the 1st Runner Up in the first season of Amazon Prime Video's show, Comicstaan.

Dua has also served as a cricket commentator during IPL 2021 on Hotstar Dosts, and as an actor in advertisements for CultFit, Zomato, Hyundai Grand i10, Nando's, and Wakefit.

Dua has served as the host for events such as the finale of the third season of Comicstaan and the second season of SharkTank India.

In June 2025, he was awarded the Power Stand-Up Comic Award, at the Power Creator Awards. In August 2025, Dua announced his show, Pitch Please, in which business owners would pitch their ideas to a panel of "sharp successful business minds" in addition to comedians.

In August 2026, he appeared as a guest judge on the comedy show, India's Got Latent.
