= Christmas as Usual =

- Promotional poster
- Directed by: Petter Holmsen
- Produced by: Espen Horn; Kristian Strand Sinkerud; Jenny Victoria Jærn
- Starring: Ida Ursin-Holm; Kanan Gill
- Cinematography: Matthew Weston
- Music by: Johannes Ringen
- Production company: Motion Blur Film Production Co
- Distributed by: Netflix
- Release date: 6 December 2023
- Running time: 98 minutes
- Country: Norway
- Languages: Norwegian; English

Christmas as Usual (Norwegian: Så var det jul igjen) is a 2023 Norwegian romantic comedy film directed by Petter Holmsen starring Ida Ursin-Holm and Kanan Gill. The film is based on the true story of Holmsen's sister, a Norwegian, and her relationship with an Indian, whom she brings home for Christmas Eve.

Thea goes back to her rural hometown to celebrate a classic Norwegian Christmas with her family, bringing along Jashan, her Indian fiancé. Hoping it will be Christmas as usual, it becomes a tumultuous clash of vastly different beliefs and traditions.

The film was released on December 6, 2023, on Netflix and received mostly negative reviews.

== Plot ==
On December 1 in Los Angeles, Jashan proposes to Thea. She accepts and invites him to spend Christmas Eve with her family in Telemark. Unsure how they will react, as Jashan is a Hindu and Indian, Thea decides to share the news in Norway.

Upon their arrival, Thea's mother Anne-Lise is taken aback, not expecting to meet an Indian. Jashan tries to compliment the house and decorations, which he also manage to foul up slightly. Saying goodnight, he calls Anne-Lise mamma which she dislikes, after she rejects the Indian term auntie, he settles on mamma.

Thea is up early, so her mother tells her that Jorgen, the neighbor and her ex, misses her. Anne-Lise points out that Jashan's culture is very different from theirs, having done some online research. Uncomfortable with her mother's response so far, as there is a culture clash, Thea convinces Jashan to put off announcing the engagement until she finds the right moment.

On the morning of Teeny Tiny Christmas (December 22), Thea's brother Simen arrives with his pregnant wife Hildegunn and daughter Ronja. Also surprised, he questions the relationship, especially when she exitedly shows them the ring. Jashan manages to choke down the unfamiliar food, makes an Indian snowman and goes with them to Thea's father's grave.

Thea suggests to Jashan they make dinner special, referring to announcing their engagement. He, on the other hand, believes that Thea wants them to prepare the evening meal, so prepares a huge curry dinner. The Norwegians are appalled, as each day up to Christmas is meticulously planned already. However, they sit down to try and eat it.

Just as Thea begins to share about the engagement, Simen, Ronja and Anne-Lise start to have a strong reaction to the spices, as they are unused to a high level of spice. Hildegunn is fine, having spent some months in India in her youth. She shows Thea and Jashan the tattoo she got then, which she believes says 'inner peace'. He reveals that it really says 'white girl', leaving her without words.

On the 23rd, 'Tiny Christmas', they all head out on cross-country skiis. Jashan is disappointed that their 'lunch spot' is just a place to cook meat on a stick and NOT a restaurant. He and Thea hold back to spend time alone. As dusk approaches, Jørgen nears them with a snowmobile, upon Anne-Lise's request. Jashan happily accepts, unaware he is her ex of five years and former neighbor.

The next day, now aware of Jørgen's past connection with Thea, Jashan jumps in to the ice bathing to save face. However, he catches cold, inadvertently interrupting Ronja's solo at church. Dinner's main course is crispy pig fat, which both Jashan and Ronja have difficulty choking down. He tries to mask the flavor with bottles from the kitchen of dried garlic and Indian chili which have labels, “Hindu” and “Black Boy”. Jashan feels insulted by Norway as a whole due to the spice labels.

Jørgen shows up, dressed as Father Christmas, to deliver people's presents. As Ronja is sitting on one his knees, he convinces Thea to sit on the other. Jashan protests, so Jørgen goes to leave, whispering something in his ear on his way. Jashan, drunk from potato liquor, gets into a fight with him and they knock over the Christmas tree.

After Jørgen leaves, Jashan also chooses to go, as he has gone through a roller coaster of emotions because Thea did not help him. He heads to the airport by taxi. Ronja asks for him, calling him 'cool'. She goes on to say she knew it was Jørgen in the red suit, that he obviously is still in love with her and Jashan had not ruined the Christmas carol solo as she felt obligated.

Thea realizes she made a terrible mistake, so hurries off to the airport with her mother driving and everyone else in the back. She bypasses security to declare her love to Jashan and propose. However, security catches up with them and escorts them out of the terminal.

One year later, Thea and Jashan return to Norway for Christmas. This time they have mixed the two cultures together, in customs, food and dress. At midnight, they go outside, count down to midnight and shout Happy Christmas as Jashan's family does in India. The happy couple lets it slip that their upcoming marriage is going to be held in India, to the Norwegians' surprise.

== Cast ==
- Ida Ursin-Holm as Thea Evjen
- Kanan Gill as Jashan Joshi
- Marit Adelaide Andreassen as Anne-Lise Evjen
- Veslemøy Mørkrid as Hildegunn Evjen
- Erik Follestad as Simen Evjen
- Matilde Hovdegard as Ronja Evjen
- Mads Sjøgård Pettersen as Jørgen Bruun

The real Thea and Jashan (Mia Holmsen and Akshay Chawdhry) cameo as themselves at the end of the film.

== Reception ==
A critic from NRK P3 wrote that "The film's uncomfortable mood also blocks the Christmas spirit for far too long, but viewers who persevere will get a version of postcard Christmas cheer and nods to "Love Actually" eventually. Even for a Christmas streaming movie lover, 'Then it was Christmas again' becomes too thin a soup spread too thick". A critic from Vink wrote that "This new Norwegian Christmas comedy follows a well-known and beloved recipe. But it is not particularly funny".

A critic from Decider wrote that "SKIP IT, if anything, just to show solidarity towards Jashan. #JusticeforJashan. You deserve better, king". A critic from Ready Steady Cut wrote that "Other than the weird plot and content, the film is nicely shot and there are some comedic moments that allow Christmas as Usual to be a nice, easy watch. However, it is not going to be a Christmas film I suggest watching every year — once will be enough".

A critic from Times Now rated the film 1 1/2 out of 5 stars and wrote that "The film does have a few amusing moments, but that's not enough to tide the viewer through the rest of the mess. You're better off catching an actual Bollywood romance instead". A critic from The Times of India rated the film three out of five stars and wrote that "Christmas As Usual is not a great film but it's not without its merits. Moments of genuine amusement pepper the film, making it an option for those seeking a light-hearted Christmas film this festive season".
