= Kenny Sebastian =

Indian stand-up comedian (born 1990)

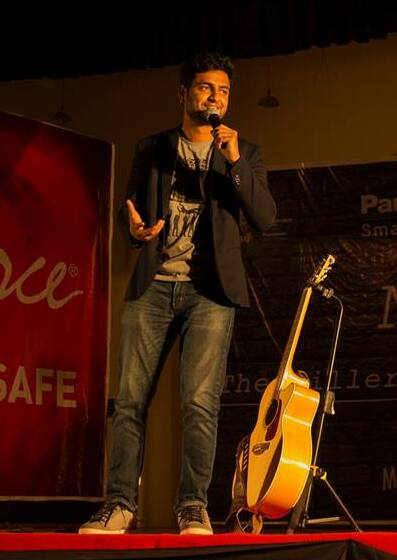
- Sebastian performing in 2016
- Born: Kenneth Mathew Sebastian; 31 December 1990 (age 35); Pala, Kerala, India
- Education: College of Fine Arts, Bangalore
- Occupations: Stand-up comedian; musician
- Years active: 2006–present
- Known for: Stand up comedy
- Spouse: Tracy Alison Viegas (m. 2022)
- Children: 1
- Website: knowkenny.com

Kenneth Mathew Sebastian (born 31 December 1990) is an Indian stand-up comedian. He first rose to prominence through a YouTube channel that broadcasts clips of his stand-up shows, devotional song covers, in addition to original skits, garnering 152 million views since 2008. He has toured the United States, Singapore, the United Arab Emirates and Australia. In 2017, he produced an hour-long comedy special for Amazon Prime. He performs primarily in English, switching to Hindi for comic effect. He was also a judge in Comicstaan, a comedy reality show. He released his special The Most Interesting Person In The Room on Netflix in 2020.

== Early life and education ==
Kenneth Mathew Sebastian was born on 31 December 1990 in Pala, Kerala, and was raised in Bangalore. His father was in the Indian Navy, hence Sebastian migrated throughout his childhood. He speaks English, Hindi, Kannada and Malayalam. Sebastian went to Kendriya Vidyalaya N.A.L. for his education. He holds a degree in Visual Arts from the College of Fine Arts, Bengaluru. Kenny married his longtime partner, Tracy Alison Viegas in Goa on 16 January 2022. The couple had their first daughter Emily in 2024.

== Career ==
Kenny made songs from tweets, popularly known as #KennySing4Me. This gained him his initial popularity. He also created an improvised sketch show for Comedy Central known as The Living Room. He co-wrote and acted in the web series called Star Boyz. He did a cameo in the web series Humorously Yours, in Better Life Foundation by Naveen Richard and in Pushpavalli by Sumukhi Suresh. He also has an original series Die Trying, an improvised show The Improvisers: Something From Nothing along with Abish Mathew, Kanan Gill and Kaneez Surka and a sketch comedy show Sketchy Behaviour co-written and co-starring Kanan Gill on Amazon Prime Video. He also started his mini series named Getting There which has 3 episodes and two stand-up specials, each on Amazon Prime and Netflix.

He is a judge for Comicstaan, a comedy hunt reality show on Amazon Prime Video.

His podcast titled Simple Ken, which has featured various guests, has also gained popularity on audio streaming services and on YouTube. However, Kenny has stated time and again on the podcast that he would like the Simple Ken community to remain small, as it was meant to be a personal, niche venture, and not mainstream.

He has his own production house named SuperHuman Studioz and has also edited a Bollywood film "Station" at the age of 21. He also did subtitling work for about a month, before he quit abruptly.

== Filmography ==
Year	Name	Platform	Notes
2014	Journey to the Center of My Brain	YouTube	Himself
2015	Insides Out	YouTube	Himself
2016	Star Boyz	YouTube	Actor
2016	A Door through a Window	YouTube	Himself
2016	Breezer Vivid	YouTube	Alongside Abish Mathew
2017–2018	Son Of Abish	YouTube	Season 2 with Radhika Apte
2017–2018	Son Of Abish	YouTube	Season 4 with Yami Gautam
2017–Present	Chai Time with Kenny	YouTube	Himself
2017	Don't Make That Face by Naveen Richard	Amazon Video	Director
2017	Don't Be That Guy	Amazon Video	Himself
2018	Die Trying	Amazon Video	Kenny
2018	The Improvisers: Something From Nothing	Amazon Video	Alongside Kanan Gill, Abish Mathew, Kaneez Surka
2018	Comicstaan	Amazon Video	Himself- Judge
2019	Sketchy Behaviour	Amazon Video	Alongside Kanan Gill
2019	Comicstaan season 2	Amazon Video	Himself- Judge
2020	The Most Interesting Person in the Room	Netflix	Himself
2021	Comedy Premium League 2021	Netflix	Part of the team Gharelu Gilheris

== Discography ==
Year	Type	Title	Number of Songs	Songs	Language	Notes
2018	Album	Die Trying (Album)	8	It's Not Love, It's Hanging Out; Wake up Next to You; Die Trying; I Know That I Am Wrong Again; The System; Die Trying – Angst Version; Making It Big While Making Music; Bad Band Friend	English	This album is from the soundtrack of the film Die Trying; Soundarya Jayachandran is the female lead for Wake Up Next To You; Some songs are sung by Nigel Rajaratnam
2020	Single	Wake Up In The Morning	1	Wake Up In The Morning	English	

== See also ==
- List of Indian comedians
- List of stand-up comedians
