= Only Much Louder =

Entertainment Company

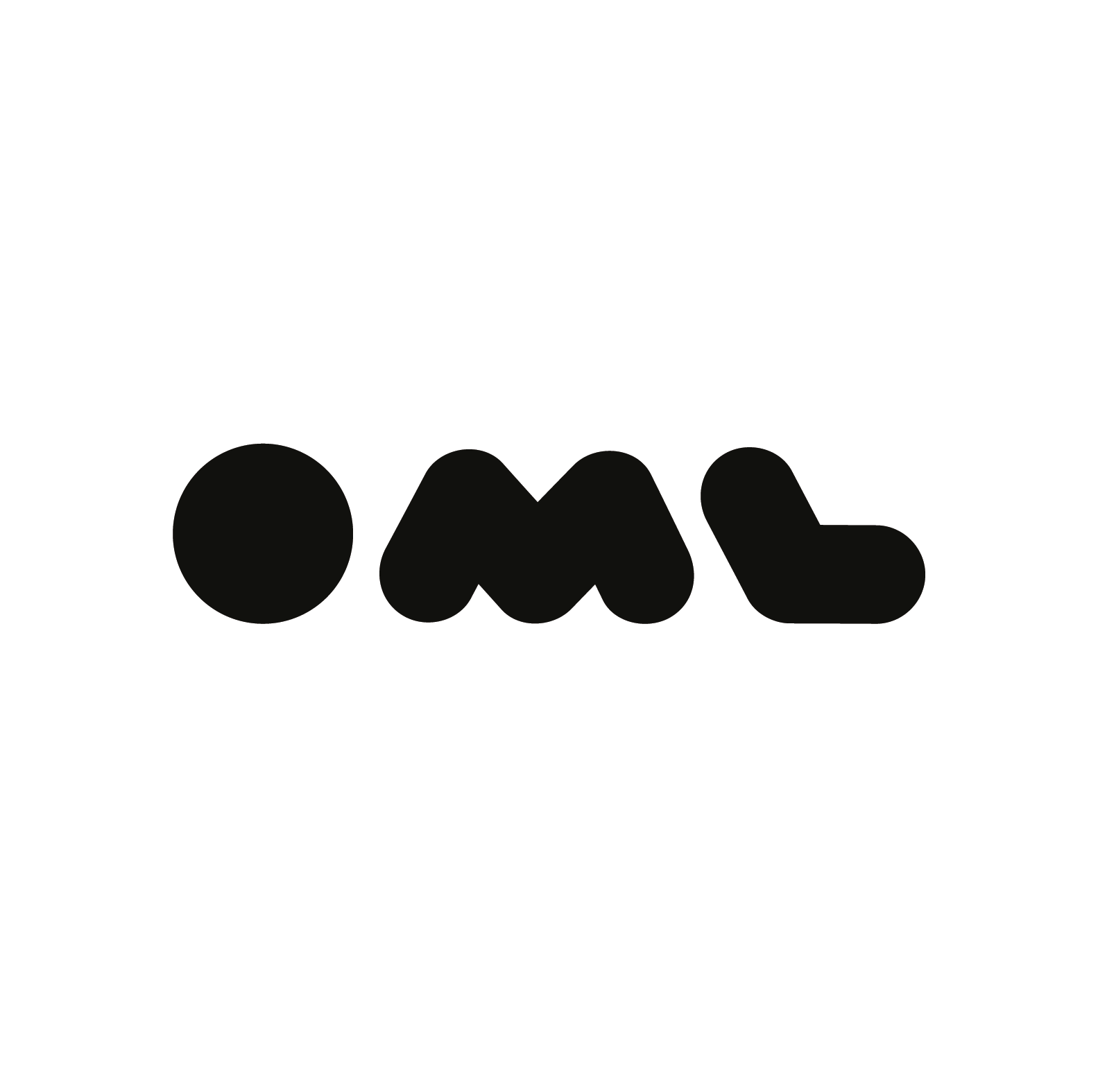
- Type: Privately Held Company
- Industry: Entertainment
- Genre: Comedy; Music
- Founded: 2002 (unofficially); 2006 (officially)
- Founder: Vijay Nair; Girish "Bobby" Talwar
- Headquarters: Mumbai, India
- Area served: India
- Services: Artist management; Live events; Video production
- Website: oml.in

Only Much Louder (OML) is an Indian artist management, event management company and a content production house that was co-founded by Vijay Nair and Girish "Bobby" Talwar in Mumbai. It informally began, in 2002, as an independent artist management venture by Nair and was officially incorporated in 2006 by Talwar and Nair.

The company produces live events—music, comedy—alongside digital and TV content. It manages a roster of artists which include comedians and musicians. OML also ran a ticketing and technology platform, Insider.in, which was acquired by PayTM in 2017.

In November, 2018, amid the sweeping Indian #MeToo movement, numerous allegations of sexual impropriety and abusive behavior emerged around the company culture under Vijay Nair's tenure as co-founder and CEO. These included specific allegations against Nair and other senior executives. In response, the company stated that Nair had parted ways with OML six months prior to the allegations surfacing, and said no allegations were made during his time as chief-executive.

== History ==
=== 1999–2005 ===
Nair started his career at 15 by doing marketing gigs for Procter & Gamble's web portal Masti.com, and the indie music forum, Gigpad.com. He was tasked with booking bands for shows and making band websites. Talwar was the bassist of Mumbai-based pop-rock band Zero, who were later on managed by Nair.

Nair dropped out of Sydenham College, after completing his first year, at 18, and began independently managing artists, booking, and promoting shows in Mumbai and across India. In 2001, Nair was earning roughly ₹700 ($9.75; November, 2019, exchange rate) as commission on shows he worked on. He initially planned to do it for one year and return to college.

He started managing Pune based, alt-rock band, Acquired Funk Syndrome in 2002. He added Mumbai based metal band, Pin Drop Violence, Mumbai based pop-rock act, Zero to his roster and in 2003 started managing, Mumbai based electro-rock band, Pentagram, who were fronted by Vishal Dadlani. Meanwhile, Talwar continued performing with Zero, graduated with a law degree from GLC, and began working as a media and entertainment lawyer.

=== 2005–2017 ===
In 2003 Pentagram performed at the Sun Dance Festival, in Tallinn, Estonia and, in 2005, performed at Glastonbury, making them the first Indian band to do so. Nair and Talwar soon set up an office in Shivaji Park, in Zero's first jam-pad, and officially incorporated Only Much Louder as an artist management company in 2006. Over the next decade they merged with production houses, booking agencies and blogs. In 2009 the company's annual revenue was estimated to be $500,000.

At one time OML ran a digital publication, video production house, booking agency, record label, and live event company. This expansion was partly spearheaded by Nair's elder sibling, Ajay Nair, who joined the company, in 2010, as the CFO and later became COO. Ajay previously worked in private equity. Until 2011, the company hadn't employed more than 20 people, had no HR department and worked out of apartments in Mumbai including initially out of Nair's parents’ home in Malad, and later in Bandra.

In 2012 the Chernin Group acquired a 49.9% stake, for an undisclosed amount, in the company along with, an undisclosed investment by, the Jain Group. By 2013 the company occupied an 8,500 sqft office in Lower Parel, Mumbai. The same year, they diversified their roster by signing comedians after a decade of exclusively managing musicians. In 2014 it was speculated the company was worth over $10 million. By February, 2017, the company had employed 130 people and had an estimated annual revenue of $14 million. In April, 2015, co-founder Girish "Bobby" Talwar had departed from the company and has since worked for BookMyShow and Weirdass Comedy. By Mid-2016, the company shut down NH7.in as a digital platform and rebranded it solely as the festival website

=== 2019 – present ===
Investigations by the Central Bureau of Investigation (CBI) and the Enforcement Directorate (ED) suggest that Nair played a pivotal role in manipulating the excise policy to favor certain liquor vendors. The ED's chargesheet describes him as the "sutradhar" (string-puller) of the conspiracy, alleging that he facilitated kickbacks and undue favors to select stakeholders in the liquor business .India Today ThePrint The Times of India Further, the ED claims that Nair acted as a middleman on behalf of AAP leaders to collect bribes in exchange for favorable policy changes. An instance cited involves a FaceTime call where Delhi Chief Minister Arvind Kejriwal allegedly told liquor businessman Sameer Mahendru to trust Nair, referring to him as "my boy" .As of October, 2019, Nair was working as an associate for the Aam Admi Party, in New Delhi, doing "ad-hoc work." Only Much Louder has since limited its scope to managing a smaller roster of artists, who are majorly comedians, and curating its flagship arts and comedy festival. They also scaled back on their digital platforms, which included content and video production. In December 2019 the company reshuffled their executive team. Gunjan Arya was named chief executive, Dhruv Sheth was named chief operating and Saurabh Abbi as chief business officer. Ajay Nair continued on as managing director.

== Divisions ==
=== Booking ===
Only Much Louder initially began as a one-man booking agency, helmed by a teenage Vijay Nair in Mumbai. Once Girish "Bobby" Talwar joined, the booking division was renamed The Syndicate. They transitioned into a full service booking agency, and booked shows for clients, who included corporates, venues, colleges, and clubs, across India and now globally. It is estimated the agency books around 1500 shows each year.

=== Management ===
Initially with rock and alternative bands like Acquired Funk Syndrome, Zero, Pentagram, Vijay Nair began independently representing bands and non-film musicians in India. Once Girish "Bobby" Talwar joined and the company was set up, they began managing bands like Shaai'r + Func, Swarathma and Raghu Dixit. They further diversified their music roster with the addition of electronic artists like Dualist Inquiry, Sandunes and Nucleya, while also briefly representing Naezy and other hip-hop musicians.

They added comedy acts, in 2013, after signing Vir Das, All India Bakchod, Kanan Gill, Biswa Kalyan Rath, East India Comedy and others. In 2017 the division underwent a significant change when their head, Tej Brar, quit. By April, 2017, the company had dropped a large portion of their music roster, including long time signees Swarathma. Vasu Dixit, the frontman of Swarathma, said of the decision: "lately their focus has shifted towards comedy and mostly EDM. OML now is India's biggest comedy talent management company with over 60 comedians exclusively managed by them. In 2020, OML forayed into managing creators such as Dolly Singh, Ankush Bahuguna, Larrisa D'Sa along with writers, directors, mentalists and Chefs. After diversifying its talent management, OML manages over 90 creators & comedians exclusively. "

=== Production ===
==== Video ====
Babble Fish was a media production house founded, and based, in Mumbai by Samira Kanwar and OML in 2008. It began with an initial investment of ₹250,000 ($3480). Kanwar previously worked as a television producer and director, including a two-year stint at Channel V India. Initially Babble Fish began shooting live events, making digital content and music videos for Indian independent artists. One of their first shows, called The P-Man Show, was hosted by Mumbai-based musician Rohit "P-Man" Pereira, a bassist who played with Shaair + Func and was the founding member of Pin Drop Violence. It featured Pereira conducting interviews and reviewing shows.

They also created music videos for Pentagram, Shaai'r + Func, Them Clones, and Raghu Dixit alongside shooting concerts like Iron Maiden. In 2010, Kanwar was solely responsible for operating the division and had three employees. The same year, Babble Fish produced the music video for Mumford & Sons song, The Cave, which was directed by Pulse Films in Goa. Soon after, the division started to conceptualize and produce television shows and created digital content for brands and comedians. Some of the shows they conceptualized and produced include: Dewarists, Sound Trippin and Bring On The Night. Before All India Bakchod developed an in-house production unit, Babble Fish was responsible for creating their YouTube content. After serving as the chief-executive of the division, and content director at OML, Kanwar departed the company in 2017.

==== Live ====
Alongside being one of the first booking agencies, Vijay Nair and Girish "Bobby" Talwar also began producing shows in Mumbai and across India. They produced events in clubs, venues and colleges in India. One of their first large-scale co-productions was the Big Chill Festival's Indian edition, in Goa, in 2007. In 2010 the company created NH7 Weekender, their flagship multi-stage music festival in Pune. Over the years, the festival expanded to multiple cities and added comedy. They also produced large-scale music events for brands like Puma, Converse and RedBull.

Only Much Louder has booked, promoted, and curated thousands of shows in various types of venues across India. They have also created festivals: Invasion Festival (headlined by The Prodigy in 2011 and David Guetta in 2012,) A Summers Day, (headlined by Norah Jones in 2013,) a theater and comedy festival called Stage42, and Vir Das's comedy festival Weirdass Pajama. OML also booked Indian tours for Russell Peters, Bill Burr, Enrique Iglesias, Mumford & Sons and other musicians and comedians. In March, 2015, Jerry Seinfeld was booked to perform in Mumbai, but the tour was cancelled because the Mumbai police anticipated it would cause a traffic hazard. They are also the producers of India's biggest touring IPs "LOLStars" & "Headliners" that was kick-started in late 2017. OML has produced over 250 shows under these IPs & sold over 100,000 tickets. OML continues to produce Live shows in over 60 cities in India. In late 2018, OML started building International tours for the talent that they manage, and by early 2020, OML had done shows in about 45 cities globally, in markets such as the UK, Europe, USA, Canada, Singapore, Hong Kong & Dubai.

.

===== Weekender =====
After attending Glastonbury in 2006, Nair and Talwar began formulating the idea of an Indian multi-genre music festival along the same lines. After meeting Glastonbury festival bookers Stephen Budd and Martin Elbourne, they put together the first edition in Pune, in 2010. It was a three-day, multi stage and genre festival which was headlined by Asian Dub Foundation. It also hosted seminal Indian indie acts like Lounge Piranha, Junkyard Groove, Zero, and Demonic Resurrection.

In 2012 the festival expanded to two cities and included a total of three multi day and stage festivals in Pune, Delhi and Bangalore. Since then, the festival has been hosted in Kolkata, Meghalaya, Hyderabad and Shillong with smaller, single-day, festivals in Mysore, Jaipur, Nagpur and other cities. The festival is held annually between October and December. In August 2019, to celebrate its 10th edition in Pune, where the first NH7 Weekender was held, pre-sale tickets were put on sale at the same prices they were sold at in 2010 — ₹750 ($10.45; under 21 season tickets; November, 2019, exchange rate) and ₹1500 ($20.90; regular season tickets; November, 2019, exchange rate).

=== Digital ===
OML Digital was the consolidation of the digital properties acquired by Only Much Louder. It was often referred to by its publication URL: NH7.in. Formed in 2010, it was a combination Indiecision, a music blog, and RadioVeRVe, an online radio. The publication covered the Indian independent music scene alongside topics of alternative culture.

RadioVeRVe was co-founded by Bangalore-based, entrepreneur and technologist, Shreyas Srinivasan (and musician Gaurav Vaz) in 2006. Srinivasan bootstrapped the venture in Atul Chitnis's basement. The platform, in one of its many iterations, streamed Indian artists and was among the first of its kind in the subcontinent to do so. Indiecision was a music blog started by journalist Arjun S Ravi, in Mumbai, in 2008. It was one of the earliest digital platforms that exclusively covered independent, and non-film, music. Ravi, a St. Xavier's and MICA alum, began the website after working as a music journalist for Indian and global publications and later working as an editor at JAM Magazine. He began the site in his living room.

Indiecision and RadioVeRVe were brought under the OML umbrella, with Ravi and Srinivasan serving as co-founding partners, in 2010. They initially worked between Mumbai and Bangalore, before shifting headquarters to Mumbai, in Lower Parel. The site continued to work as an online publication and included a rebranded RadioVeRVe, as its native online radio.

The publication reviewed and wrote features with a primary focus on Indian and sub-continental artists, and alternative culture, with added global coverage. The online radio amassed a large, and exclusive, collection of independent music primarily from the sub-continent. It also launched a short-lived digital music store in collaboration with Flipkart. Since mid-2016, NH7.in ceased to operate as an online publication and became the official Weekender festival website. Since then, both Ravi and Srinivasan have moved on to other full time roles. Ravi works as the India head for Red Bull Media House, while Srinivasan went on to create, the ticketing platform, PayTM Insider.

=== Ticketing ===
In 2014, while working at OML, a team led by Srinivasan launched the online ticketing platform Insider.in. It was first used as a native ticketing platform for OML related events including Weekender and their comedy shows. They eventually expanded outside the OML roster and began ticketing events in numerous Indian cities. They expanded their scope from arts and culture events to outdoor extracurricular, other indoor events and sporting events. In July, 2017, PayTM acquired a majority stake in the company and rebranded it as PayTM Insider.

=== Record label ===
Counterculture Records was set up by Talwar in 2007 as an outlet for their music roster and other emerging talent. The initial compilation releases included singles from Raghu Dixit Project, Brute Force, Skinny Alley, Pentagram, Them Clones, Zero and other Indian artists. It was based in Mumbai, and after a dozen releases has remained inactive for over five years.

== Allegations of sexual assault ==
In November 2018, three senior management executives were named as sexual assailants by multiple woman associates and employees of the company. Those accused were Vijay Nair (former CEO and co-founder), Girish Raj (former project lead and festival director), and Gaurav Dewani (former head of sales). Numerous allegations of sexual impropriety and abusive behavior emerged surrounding the company culture under Vijay Nair's tenure as co-founder and CEO. Sourya Sen, a former employee at OML's video team, called the company culture "incestuous".

The allegations were published in a Caravan story, on 1 November 2018, one month after the initial wave of Indian #MeToo allegations. Managing partners, Ajay Nair and Tulika Yadav were also criticized for continuing to foster a hostile environment, while ignoring specific complaints. As a result, a number of artists backed out from performing at the NH7 Weekender, in Pune, in December, 2018. The story stated Nair's position in power "allowed him to act brazenly and with impunity." In an emailed statement to the magazine, Nair admitted to no wrongdoing.

In response, OML issued a statement and said the article "selectively picks certain incidents from the last 8 years to paint a biased, one-sided picture." They also added that Vijay Nair has parted ways with the company six months prior to the publication of the story and that no allegations were made during his tenure as chief-executive.

=== Aftermath ===
Nair has continued to work with the Aam Admi Party (AAP) since parting ways formally with OML. Nair's association with the party dates back to January, 2014, when he floated the idea of booking a series of concerts for the party. Party spokeswoman, Atishi, confirmed Nair was working with AAP, but denied any knowledge of the allegations against him.

Dewani's case was dismissed as a minor infraction and did not result in any severe consequences according to an internal investigation conducted by the company. Frustrated by the decision, the employee who accused him of sexual assault left the company. Dewani continued to work at the company until January, 2016 — two years after the employee left.

Raj was formally counseled and given a warning that future transgressions would result in termination. Raj wrote a formal apology to the former employee. He said he wrote a "heartfelt apology" after the investigation procedure. "In it, I recall telling her I recognized that as her senior I should have been more appropriate in my interactions and mindful of my words," said Raj. He quit the company in late 2016.
