= Wakefit =

Indian home and furnishings company

- Type: Public
- Traded as: BSE: 544642; NSE: WAKEFIT
- Industry: Home and furnishings
- Founded: March 2016
- Founders: Ankit Garg; Chaitanya Ramalingegowda
- Headquarters: Bengaluru, Karnataka, India
- Area served: India
- Key people: Ankit Garg (Chairperson, CEO & Executive Director); Chaitanya Ramalingegowda (Executive Director); Parul Gupta (CFO)
- Products: Mattresses, furniture, furnishings and décor
- Revenue: ▲₹1,489 crore (US$150 million) (FY2026)
- Operating income: ▲₹182 crore (US$19 million) (FY2026)
- Net income: ▲₹189 crore (US$20 million) (FY2026)
- Website: wakefit.co

Wakefit Innovations Ltd is an Indian home and furnishings company headquartered in Bengaluru, Karnataka. Incorporated in 2016, it sells mattresses, furniture, and furnishing and décor products. The company was listed on the Bombay Stock Exchange and National Stock Exchange of India on 15 December 2025 following an IPO of ₹1,289 crore. For financial year 2026, the company reported revenues of ₹1,489 crore.

== History ==
Wakefit was incorporated in March 2016 by Ankit Garg and Chaitanya Ramalingegowda as a direct-to-consumer mattress company. In the initial years, the company sold memory foam and orthopedic mattresses through its own website and third-party e-commerce platforms, without using retail distributors or intermediaries.

In December 2018, Wakefit raised a Series A round of approximately ₹65 crore (around US$9 million) from Sequoia Capital India.

During the COVID-19 pandemic in India, Wakefit entered the home furniture category, launching beds, sofas, wardrobes, and related home furniture.

In December 2020, Wakefit raised a Series B round of ₹185 crore (approximately US$25 million) led by Belgian consumer investment firm, Verlinvest, and Sequoia Capital India.

In November 2021, Wakefit raised a Series C round of ₹200 crore (approximately US$28 million) led by Susquehanna International Group, with participation from Verlinvest and Sequoia Capital India.

Wakefit began opening company-owned, company-operated (COCO) retail stores in 2022. The company also commenced multi-brand outlet (MBO) operations in April 2022. In August 2022, Wakefit opened its largest manufacturing facility in Hosur, Tamil Nadu.

Wakefit conducted its IPO in December 2025, with a total issue size of ₹1,288.89 crore, comprising a fresh issue of ₹377.18 crore and an offer for sale (OFS) of 4,67,54,405 shares worth ₹911.7 crore. Shares were listed on the BSE and NSE on 15 December 2025. Ahead of the listing, the company raised ₹580 crore from anchor investors.

== Operations ==
Wakefit's products span three categories: mattresses, wood and metal furniture, and home furnishings and décor. In FY2025, mattresses accounted for approximately 61.3% of revenues, furniture for 27.6%, and furnishings for 11%.

As of 2025, the company operates five manufacturing facilities: two in Bengaluru (chairs and steel bed fabrication; accessories such as pillows, comforters, and curtains), one in Sonipat, Haryana (mattresses and sofas), and two in Hosur, Tamil Nadu (engineered and solid wood furniture; mattresses).

The company had 139 company-owned, company-operated (COCO) retail stores across 76 cities in March 2026. The company's own distribution channels (website and COCO stores) contributed about 65% of its overall revenues in 2025.

== Financials ==
Year	FY2023	FY2024	FY2025	FY2026
Revenue (₹ cr)	813	986	1,274	1,489
EBITDA (₹ cr)	(93)	35	59	182
Net income (₹ cr)	(146)	(15)	35	189

== See also ==
- E-commerce in India
- Sheela Foam Limited
