= Sumukhi Suresh =

Indian actor, comedian, writer and director

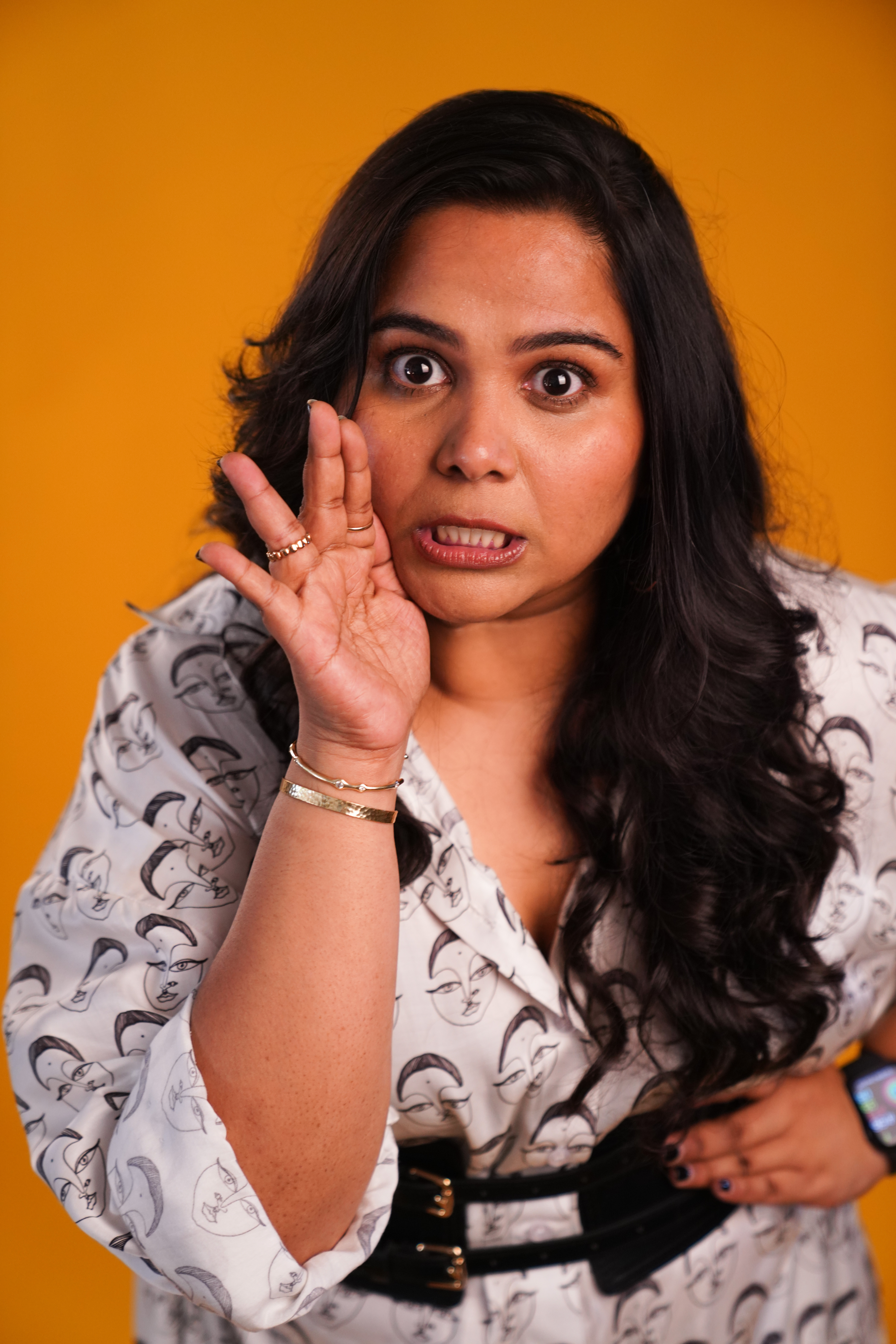
- Born: Sumukhi Suresh; 17 October 1987 (age 38); Nagpur, India
- Education: M.O.P. Vaishnav College for Women
- Notable work: Comicstaan, Don't Tell Amma, Pushpavalli, CTRL, Humble Politiciann Nograj

Comedy career
- Years active: 2014–present
- Genres: Satirical, Deadpan

Sumukhi Suresh (17 October 1987) is an Indian actor, stand-up comedian, writer and director. She is known for humorous sketches which she writes and performs in. In an online article, Hindustan Times referred to Sumukhi Suresh as "India's Tina Fey." She has been a part of stand-up comedy shows like Comicstaan, Go Straight Take Left, Comedy Premium League, her solo special Don't Tell Amma, and the web series, Pushpavalli.

== Early life ==
Sumukhi Suresh was born on 18 October 1987 in Nagpur. She completed her schooling from The Chanda Devi Saraf School, Nagpur and her graduation from M.O.P Vaishnav College for Women, Chennai. Suresh moved to Bengaluru in 2009 and started working at Hippocampus, a Children's Library. She then went on to work as a chef and was also employed at a food laboratory for a brief period of time.

In 2013, Sumukhi joined The Improv, which was an improvisational comedy show in Bengaluru, while working at the laboratory. Along with the rest of the Improv team, Sumukhi performed in 100 shows in Bengaluru, Dubai, Mumbai, Hyderabad and Sweden. In 2015, she quit her full-time job to start a career in comedy.

== Career ==
Sumukhi's first video was "Anu Aunty – The Engineering Anthem", with Varun Agarwal, which parodied Iggy Azalea's "Fancy" and went viral on social media. She then did the "Maid Sketch" with Sanjay Manaktala as the boisterous Parvati Bai. Sumukhi rose to fame after portraying the character of Sumukhi Chawla, an NGO employee, in India's first mockumentary-style YouTube series, Better Life Foundation. Sumukhi has performed comedy shows with Naveen Richard, the writer of the show Better Life Foundation. She also gained popularity for her property "Disgust Me", an exclusive for women-only stand-up comedy show.

While talking about improvisation skills in content creation, she said, "While acting comes to me in an easy manner, stand-up takes a lot more effort. I started my career with Improv and even now I carry improvisational skills into everything I do. As a matter of fact, when I work with Richard, we don’t write the dialogue first, rather we improv first."

After getting much appreciation for her role in Better Life Foundation, Sumukhi launched a video series called Behti Naak on her own YouTube channel. In the video series, she plays Behti Naak, a 10-year-old girl with a deadpan style of humour. The videos became viral.

Sumukhi was approached by Amazon Prime, India to make a web series. Pushpavalli, a semi-autobiagraphical series created by Sumukhi Suresh, was released on 15 December on Amazon Prime Video in India and received positive reviews. The show is directed by Debbie Rao and stars Naveen Richard, Manish Anand, Preetika Chawla and Shraddha. She said, "I'm glad Amazon did not impose on me that the show had to be in Hindi. Even if the streaming services have subtitles, a Hindi show does immensely well. But I didn't want that. I wanted an accurate representation of Bengaluru, where everyone knows at least three languages. I'm glad I could present South Indian people with all their quirks and ticks. I was also accused of representing every member of the community as flawed. But my defence was, 'Look at Nikhil [the man Pushpavalli falls in love with and moves city for]!' He's a Kannadiga, and he looks like a bloody flower." Naveen Richard pointed to Firstpost that he connected with Sumukhi the most because of their 'South Indian backgrounds'.

Sumukhi performed her first stand up special Don't Tell Amma for Amazon Prime Video India which, since its release, has received positive reviews. This show was recorded in Bangalore. The show wittily describes the relationship between millennials and their Indian mothers.

Sumukhi, along with fellow comedian and absurdist Naveen Richard, co-created the Prime Video show Go Straight Take Left. The show is a compilation of six sketches.

In 2018, Sumukhi Suresh hosted the first season of Prime Video's web series Comicstaan alongside comedian Abish Mathew. She was a part of the judges' panel for the second season of the same show with Urooj Ashfaq replacing her as host.

Sumukhi has acted in Humble Politician Nograj, a 2018 Kannada political satire film.. She plays the role of Lavanya, wife of Nograj, played by Danish Sait.

== Views ==
In a conversation with Newsx, she said that comedy industry is still peaking and hence it is still a community rather than an industry. She also feels that for comedy, social media and live shows are equally important and cannot replace each other.

== Motormouth ==
Sumukhi Suresh launched her company Motormouth Writers Pvt Ltd in 2022. She wants to write and create shows and movies centered on female characters. The aim is for Motormouth to go from being a writing studio to producing shows and movies.

While talking about her vision for Motormouth she says, "If we wish to change the narrative then we need to be in positions of power. I want to change culture by creating more female protagonists. I want to tell stories with real, flawed characters who are not just hot and sexy, sati Savitri, vamp, or any one of these things. Real women, and people in general are a hundred things at the same time at any given point and I want our content to reflect that."

Suresh said, "I want the people who see me, especially the girls, to think, ‘I need to have confidence like her’, because I wanted to see someone like that when I was young."

== Filmography ==
Year	Show	Platform	Role	Notes
2016	Star Boyz	YouTube	Yemma Watson	1 Season
2016	AIB: If Apps Were People	YouTube	Facebook	
2016 – present	Behti Naak	YouTube	Behti Naak	Shorts; Also Creator & Writer
2016-2018	Better Life Foundation	Disney+ Hotstar	Sumukhi Chawala	2 seasons
2017	Going Viral Pvt. Ltd.	Amazon Prime Video	Srushila	1 Season
2017	AIB: A Woman's Besties	YouTube	Vagayenti	
2017 – 2020	Pushpavalli	Amazon Prime Video	Pushpavalli Parsuraman	2 Seasons; Also Creator & Writer
2018	Beauty and the Feast	Disney+ Hotstar	Beauty	1 Season
2018	Tinderella	YouTube		1 Season
2018	Go Straight Take Left	Amazon Prime Video		Sketch show
2018	Humble Politiciann Nograj	Amazon Prime Video	Lavanya	Kannada film
2018 –2022	Comicstaan	Amazon Prime Video	Host, Judge	Hosted the first season and was on the judge panel in the second and third seasons
2019	Banake Dikha	Zomato		1 Season
2021	Comedy Premium League	Netflix		1 season; Writer & Performer
2022	Hum Do Teen Chaar	Amazon Mini TV		1 season; Actor
2022	Dongri Danger	Amazon Prime Video		Director
2022	One Mic Stand	Amazon Prime Video		Performer
2023	Moving in with Malaika	Disney+ Hotstar		1 episode; Performer
2024	CTRL	Netflix		Writer
2024	Koffee with Karan	Disney+ Hotstar		
2025	Chhoriyan Chali Gaon		Contestant	Quit, Week 3
2025	The Royals		Keerthana	
2026	Happy Patel: Khatarnak Jasoos	Theatrical release	Sakhubai Patel	Hindi film

== Awards and nominations ==
Year	Award	Category	Work	Result	Ref(s)
2022	BAFTA Breakthrough	Performer	Pushpavalli	Participant	
2021	Critics Guild Award	Best Actor Female	Pushpavalli	Nominated	
2021	Critics Guild Award	Best Writing Team	Pushpavalli	Nominated	
2021	Talenttrack Awards	Best Actor Female Comedy	Pushpavalli	Won	
2021	Filmfare OTT Awards	Best Actress in a Comedy Series (Critics)	Pushpavalli	Won	
2021	Istanbul Film Awards (Oct)	Best Actress	Pushpavalli	Won	
2021	IWMBuzz Digital Awards Season 3	Most Popular Actress In A Comic Role In A Web Series	Pushpavalli	Won	
2019	iWmBuzz awards	Most Popular Stand up comedian (Female)		Won	
2018	iReel Awards	Best Actor Female (comedy)	Pushpavalli	Won	
2018	Talenttrack Awards	Best Actor Female Comedy	Pushpavalli	Won	
