= Shraddha Jain =

Indian stand-up comedian (born 1990)

- Born: October 25, 1990 (age 35); Mangalore, Karnataka, India
- Other name: Aiyyo Shraddha ji
- Occupations: Stand-up comedian, Content creator, Radio jockey, Actress, Television host
- Years active: 2008–present
- Known for: Stand-up comedy and online sketches in multiple languages
- Notable work: Aiyyo So Mini Things (2025 Tour)

Shraddha Jain (born 25 October 1990), also known as Aiyyo Shraddha, is an Indian standup comedian, content creator and a former radio jockey from Karnataka. She is also an actress and TV host. On 8 March 2024, she received the inaugural National Creators Award in the category of most creative creator (female) from the Prime Minister Narendra Modi.

== Early life and education ==
Jain was born in Mangalore, Karnataka, India on 25 October 1990. She learnt Kannada while doing her graduation in engineering in Bengaluru, where she lives. She was a techie, but resigned her job in 2008, to join Fever 104FM as a radio jockey. She speaks and creates content in five languages Tulu, Kannada, Hindi, Marathi, and English.

== Career ==
In July 2025, she completed her Indian tour of the show, “Aiyyo So Mini Things” in Chennai and later in August, she did three shows in Bengaluru, the last leg of her global tour where she did 80 shows visiting 10 countries and 45 cities including Singapore, Dubai, Australia, and many in Europe. She was influenced by Johnny Lever, Jerry Seinfeld and Dave Chappelle.

She acted in the TV series Pushpavalli as Vasu. She also acted as Dr. Kumudlatha Pamulparthi Diwakaran aka KLPD in the film Doctor G.
