= Ahlcon Public School =

Co-educational public school in Delhi, India

Location
- Mayur Vihar, Phase-1; Delhi, 110091; India; 28°36′30.9″N 77°17′30″E

Information
- Type: Co educational - Public School
- Motto: Light to Enlighten
- Established: 1988
- School board: CBSE
- Chairman: Shri Vikaas Ahluwalia
- Principal: Deepak Raj Singh Bisht
- Enrollment: 3200
- Language: English
- Campus size: 3.543 acres (14,340 m^{2})
- Website: www.ahlconpublicschool.com

Ahlcon Public School is a co-educational English Medium public school, established in 1988 by the Shanti Devi Progressive Education Society in New Delhi, India and is duly recognized by the Directorate of Education, Govt. of NCT, Delhi. The school is affiliated to Central Board of Secondary Education and offers AISSE and AISSCE at Standard X and XII respectively. The school has four student houses – Dhruv (Red), Eklavya (Yellow), Prahlad (Blue) and Shravan (Green).

== Campus and facilities ==
The school provides various facilities to its students which include two libraries that house 20,000 books, a reading room, a video library, school counseling centre, an auditorium, student canteens, stationery supply shop and medical centre. The school has laboratories for Computing, Physics, Chemistry, Biology, Multimedia, Language, Robotics, and Mathematics. The Sports Complex has facilities for cricket, football, basketball, table tennis, yoga and badminton. It also comprises separate play facilities for the nursery and prep block students.

== Subjects and activities ==
Besides using English as its medium of instruction for the major courses (Elementary courses, Mathematics, Sciences, Economics & Social Studies), the school also imparts communication skills in Hindi, French, and Sanskrit. There are three main elective streams for study beyond Class 10th: Science, Commerce, and Humanities.

Co-curricular activities include art, crafts, dance, and vocal and instrumental music. Culturally, the school has computer, drama, quizzing, yoga, music (instrumental as well as vocal) and art groups. The school is host to myriad inter-school as well as intra-school competitions. The school also had founded a charitable wing for the economically disadvantaged and imparts night classes to their children as well. Silico Battles, an inter-school computer festival organized every year by the school, has seen record participation from the best schools of Delhi and NCR. The school celebrated the Silver Jubilee of its establishment in 2013.

== School magazine ==
The school magazine, Vivitsa, is an annual publication which highlights the achievements of the school's students in various arenas, and publishes selected creative pieces submitted by various students.

== Controversy ==
In 2018 the school was subject to scrutiny following the suicide of a 16-year-old student in March. The child's parents alleged that teachers at Ahlcon Public School had sexually harassed her and intentionally failed her on exams, causing her suicide. The school's principal and two teachers were investigated as abetment to suicide is a crime in India. The family demanded that the Central Bureau of Investigation open an investigation into the school. On the 22 March the family began protesting due to a lack of arrested by police. 200 protesters blocked a major Noida link road for five hours, causing a traffic backlog. On the 27 March the family raised a petition with the Supreme Court of India, asking for the Central Bureau of Investigation to open a case. The Supreme Court refused the petition, stating the family needed to approach the relevant High Court first. On 17 July 2018 the principal and two teachers were arrested.
