= Samay Raina =

Indian comedian and YouTuber (born 1997)

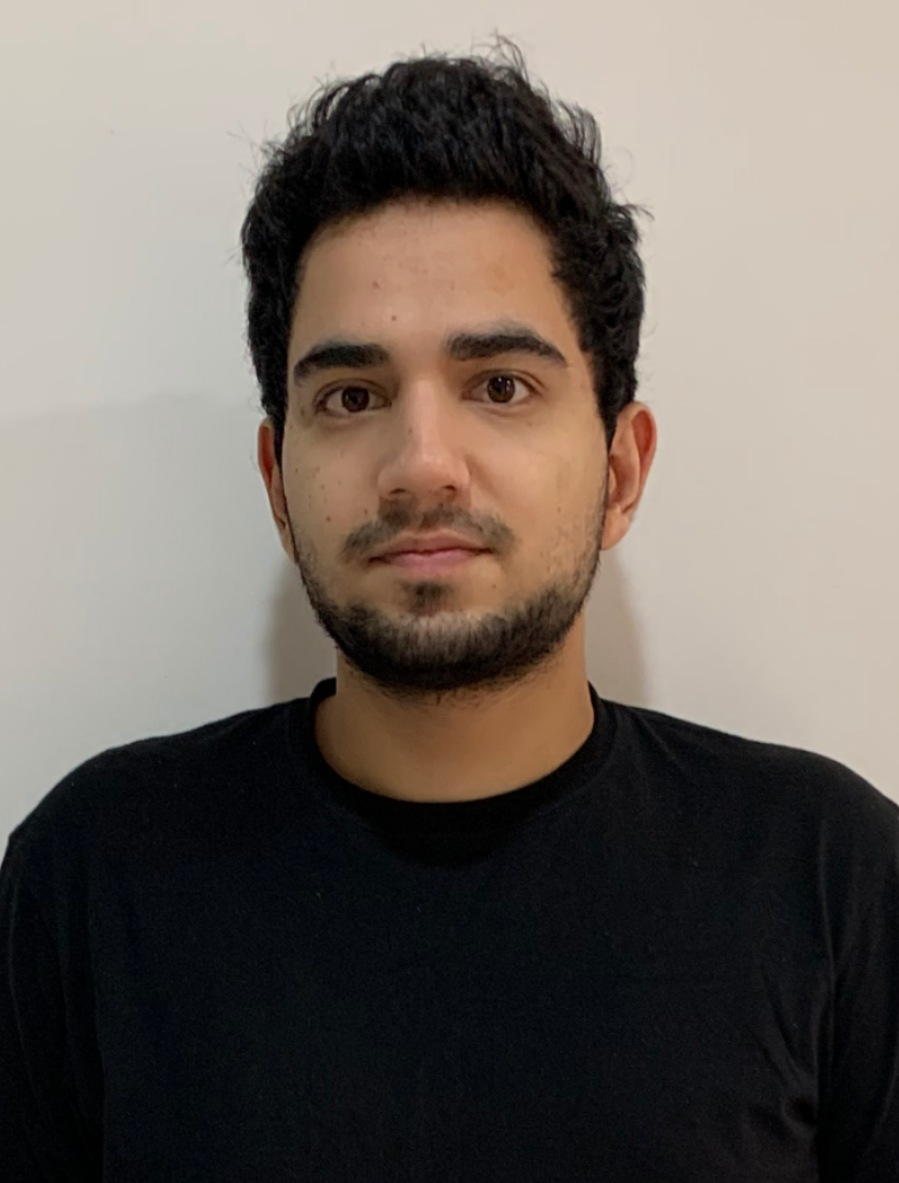
- Raina in 2020
- Born: 26 October 1997 (age 29); Jammu, Jammu and Kashmir India
- Education: PVG's College of Engineering
- Occupations: Stand-up comedian; YouTuber
- Years active: 2017–present
- Known for: India's Got Latent; Comicstaan 2

YouTube information
- Channel: Samay Raina
- Genres: Comedy; Gameplay; Chess
- Subscribers: 12.3 million
- Views: 1.4 billion
- Last updated: 16 November 2026

Samay Raina (born 26 October 1997) is an Indian stand-up comedian and YouTuber. He was the co-winner of the stand-up comedy contest Comicstaan 2 (2019). Since 2024, he has been hosting the comedy talent show, India's Got Latent.

== Early life ==
Raina was born in Jammu city of the erstwhile Indian state of Jammu and Kashmir into a conservative Kashmiri Pandit family from Salia area of Seer Hamdan Anantnag. He grew up in Hyderabad, where he completed his schooling. He enrolled in a print engineering course at Vidhyarthi Griha's College of Engineering and Technology in Pune, Maharashtra, which he said was a waste of time, and started doing open mic events and eventually became a regular in the local comedy scene.

== Career ==
=== Stand-up ===
After performing at multiple open mics since 27 August 2017, Raina began opening for well-known comedians like Anirban Dasgupta and Abhishek Upmanyu in Pune. As he gained recognition, he moved to Mumbai to pursue a career in stand-up comedy and gave several successful shows in Mumbai and several cities across the nation. In 2019, he participated in Comicstaan 2 due to a suggestion from comedian Aakash Gupta. Later, he became the joint winner of Comicstaan 2 with Gupta, aired on Amazon Prime Video.

In 2023, Raina performed at the launch party of American DJ KSHMR's album KARAM, at antiSOCIAL in Mumbai.

In 2025, he announced a nationwide tour across India, "Still Alive And Unfiltered", which was touted as a comeback, following the controversy surrounding his show, India's Got Latent. The tour commenced in Bengaluru on 15 August and ended in Delhi on 5 October. In 2026, he became one of the youngest Indian comedians to perform at Madison Square Garden, closing his global leg of the tour. On 7 March 2026, he released his debut comedy special, Still Alive, on YouTube, after almost a year of hiatus from the platform, which became the most viewed stand-up comedy special on YouTube.

In June 2026, he announced two collaborations with Netflix India; the first being the second season of his show India's Got Latent, which would be streaming on Netflix as well as YouTube, and the second being a new stand-up special. In August 2026, Raina was felicitated by the Chief Minister of Maharashtra Devendra Fadnavis, for his contribution to the cyber-awareness short film Digital Arrest, and the "1930 Maharashtra Cyber Anthem", produced by the Maharashtra Cyber Cell.

=== YouTube ===
During the COVID-19 pandemic in India, the government cancelled all outdoor events, and thus, Raina could no longer perform stand-up comedy. He then began streaming chess games on his YouTube channel at the fellow comedian Tanmay Bhat's suggestion. His viewership boosted when he invited YouTuber Antonio Radić, popularly known as Agadmator, to his channel. In response to this, Indian GM Vidit Gujrathi tweeted that he would like to join Raina on his track. Eventually, Gujrathi appeared on Raina's channel, giving another boost to Raina's viewership. Since then, the two have fostered a strong relationship and frequently feature on each other's channels. Gujrathi attributes his moving from Twitch to YouTube to Raina's suggestion. He has also appeared in the music videos for Seedhe Maut's "11K", KRSNA's "Sensitive", and Raftaar's "Baawe".

According to many chess proponents, including GMs Viswanathan Anand, Vidit Gujrathi, Anish Giri, Teimour Radjabov, Baskaran Adhiban, Emil Sutovsky and IMs Tania Sachdev and Sagar Shah, Raina has been instrumental in popularising chess in India through his channel. Raina tries to make the game of chess more appealing to the masses through his humour which, according to many, has helped him reach a larger audience.

Several well-known chess personalities like Pentala Harikrishna, Judit Polgár, former world chess champions Vladimir Kramnik, Viswanathan Anand, Garry Kasparov and Magnus Carlsen have appeared on Raina's channel. He also organised chess tournaments featuring Indian celebrities such as cricketer Yuzvendra Chahal, and played chess with actor Aamir Khan.

In addition to chess, he also live streams many other games on his YouTube channel.

=== Chess ===
Samay plays on Chess.com as "M" Master samayraina also known as (Blunder Master "BM"). As of 5 May 2026, Raina has a rating of 1621 at rapid chess on chess.com, while the highest recorded rating was 1942 on 3 August 2026. On 5 May 2021, Raina won the $10,000 Botez Bullet Invitational, a one-hour amateur bullet arena tournament sponsored by Chess.com and hosted by the Botez sisters. He was the only Indian streamer competing among some of the top international Twitch streamers and earned $4000. In December 2025, he won the SuperPogChamps tournament hosted by chess.com, which featured 12 influencers from all over the world, including Andrea Botez and Sardoche. By winning the title, Samay earned $10,000 (Rs 8.9 lakh approx), the top prize in the Championship Bracket. He donated the prize money to the Lidè Haiti to help promote learning, health and well-being for Haitian girls.

==== Comedians on Board (COB) ====
He started organising online chess tournaments on his channel to attract the online audience to chess, called Comedians On Board (COB), inviting many of his comedian friends and other celebrities.

Comedians on Board Tournament
Season	Dates	Winner	Runner-up 1	Runner-up 2
Comedians on Board (COB) #1	29 March-2 Apr 2020	Aakash Mehta	Kunal Rao	
Comedians on Board (COB) #2	1-3 July 2020	Anirban DasGupta	Samay Raina	Biswa Kalyan Rath
Comedians on Board (COB) #3	19-21 Nov 2020	Joel Dsouza	Vaibhav Sethia	Samay Raina
Comedians on Board All Stars #4	22-30 March 2021	Samay Raina	Biswa Kalyan Rath	
Comedians on Board All In #5	11-14 Aug 2021	Samay Raina	Joel Dsouza	Prakhar Gupta
Comedians on Board Gang War (Team Event)	21-27 March 2022	Susha Squad (Team Owner- Suhani Shah)	Wazir-e-Vaibhav (Team Owner- Vaibhav Sethia)	Bot Army (Team Owner- Tanmay Bhat)
Comedians on Board: Homecoming	27-29 March 2024	Tracy Viegas	Vivek Desai	Vaibhav Sethia

==== Chess Super League (CSL) ====
Raina with ChessBase India and Nodwin Gaming organised an online chess league called Chess Super League consisting of some of the Top International and Indian Grandmasters, International Masters and Indian Junior Players, competing in six teams of six players each. For the prize pool of ₹40 lakh (US$43,000). The entire event was streamed on Raina's YouTube Channel.

During the COVID-19 pandemic, he began streaming chess games along with multiple comedians and chess masters. He has raised substantial amounts of money for various causes through his YouTube channel, including help for waste pickers, and relief for West Bengal and Assam flood victims.

== India’s Got Latent ==
In June 2024, Samay Raina launched India's Got Latent, a reality show focused on uncovering hidden talents.

He then ventured into the tech and entertainment space with the launch of his app, India's Got Latent, inspired by his YouTube show. Raina said he aimed to eventually transition the platform into a full-fledged OTT service, featuring shows across genres such as poetry, rap, and reality TV. Within hours of launch, the app reached top of the charts on Apple App Store and Google Play Store.

== Controversies ==
=== Abortion tweet ===
Amidst the overturning of the US Roe v. Wade Supreme Court ruling in 2022, Raina tweeted a joke on abortion rights. The joke was poorly received, which Raina blamed on cancel culture while critics assailed the joke as misogynist or simply not humorous.

=== Ranveer Allahbadia's remark on India's Got Latent ===
On 10 February 2025, the Chief Minister of Assam Himanta Biswa Sarma tweeted that the Guwahati Police had registered a first information report against Raina as well as other YouTubers, including Ashish Chanchlani, Jaspreet Singh, Apoorva Makhija, Ranveer Allahbadia, for promoting obscenity and engaging in sexually explicit and vulgar discussions on India's Got Latent. Allahbadia had asked a contestant on the show a hypothetical question about parental incest. Sarma also informed that the Guwahati Crime Branch had filed the case under various sections of BNS 2023, the IT Act, 2000, the Cinematograph Act, 1952, and the Indecent Representation of Women (Prohibition) Act, 1986. He added that the police investigation into the matter was ongoing. The issue was also raised in the Zero Hour of Parliament, with concerns raised about regulating platforms like YouTube. Later, the video was removed following objections from the National Human Rights Commission (NHRC). The Maharashtra Chief Minister Devendra Fadnavis condemned the YouTuber's comment. This concluded in the removal of his show from YouTube.

== Filmography ==
=== Television ===
Year	Title	Role	Notes	Ref.
2019	Comicstaan 2	Contestant	Winner	
2021	Comedy Premium League	Contestant	Winner	
2021	One Mic Stand	Himself	Season 2; Episode 5	
2024–present	India's Got Latent	Host/Judge	All episodes	
2025	Kaun Banega Crorepati	Himself	As a contestant with Tanmay Bhat	
2025	Ekaki	RJ Samay	Voice cameo in Episode 3	
2026	Still Alive	Himself	Comedy special	
2026	The Great Indian Kapil Show	Himself	Special episode, appeared as a guest alongside Ranveer Allahbadia	
