= 2 Foreigners in Bollywood =

Comedy group

- Occupations: Comedy group; actors

YouTube information
- Channel: 2ForeignersInBollywood
- Years active: 2015–present
- Genre: Comedy
- Subscribers: 6.87 Million
- Views: 899 Million

2 Foreigners in Bollywood is a comedy group known from social media based in Mumbai, India. The group consists of members Johan Bartoli, Hampus Bergqvist and Vidhan Pratap Singh. Johan and Hampus both come from Stockholm, Sweden, and moved to India in September 2015 to work as actors in the Hindi Film Industry after completing their education in business school. They both were fond of cinema from different parts of the world.

The comedy group is best known for their Facebook page and YouTube channel '2 Foreigners In Bollywood' where they upload comedy videos. Their video content is about cultural clashes and every day situations in India.

In June 2017, 2 Foreigners In Bollywood was the most viewed original video content page on Facebook India with over 70 million views in that month. Their Facebook page has 3.5 million followers (as of October 2017).
