= Abish Mathew =

Indian comedian (fl. 2007– )

- Education: Father Agnel School, New Delhi
- Occupations: Comedian; YouTuber
- Known for: Son Of Abish; Journey Of A Joke; GM in Chess
- Spouse: Archana Kavi (m. 2015; div. 2021)

YouTube information
- Channel: Abish Mathew
- Genre: Comedy
- Subscribers: 1.08 million
- Views: 178 million
- Last updated: 27 August 2026

Abish Mathew is an Indian stand-up comedian and YouTuber. He is known for his work with All India Bakchod, as the creator and host of a late night show Son of Abish and Journey Of A Joke. He is also known as GM Abish Mathew in Comedians on Board and as the host of Comicstaan.

== Personal life ==
Mathew got engaged to actress and YouTuber Archana Kavi in 2015. They were married on 23 January 2016 in Vallarpadam Church, Kerala The marriage function was attended by Rima Kallingal, Aashiq Abu and Abish's friends from Delhi and fellow comedians like Kenny Sebastian, Kaneez Surka, Rohan Joshi and Kanan Gill. In 2021, the couple filed for divorce.

== Career ==
He began his career as a radio jockey at Red FM, Delhi before switching to stand-up comedy.

He was the creator of the celebrity talk show Son Of Abish, and currently runs the show, Journey of a Joke.

In 2018, Abish appeared in an Amazon Prime Video special, Whoop.

== Controversy ==
Abish was in news in May 2021 after a nine year old tweet of his on Mayawati resurfaced. Later, an unconditional apology was given by Abish.
