= Kaneez Surka =

South African stand-up comedian (born 1983)

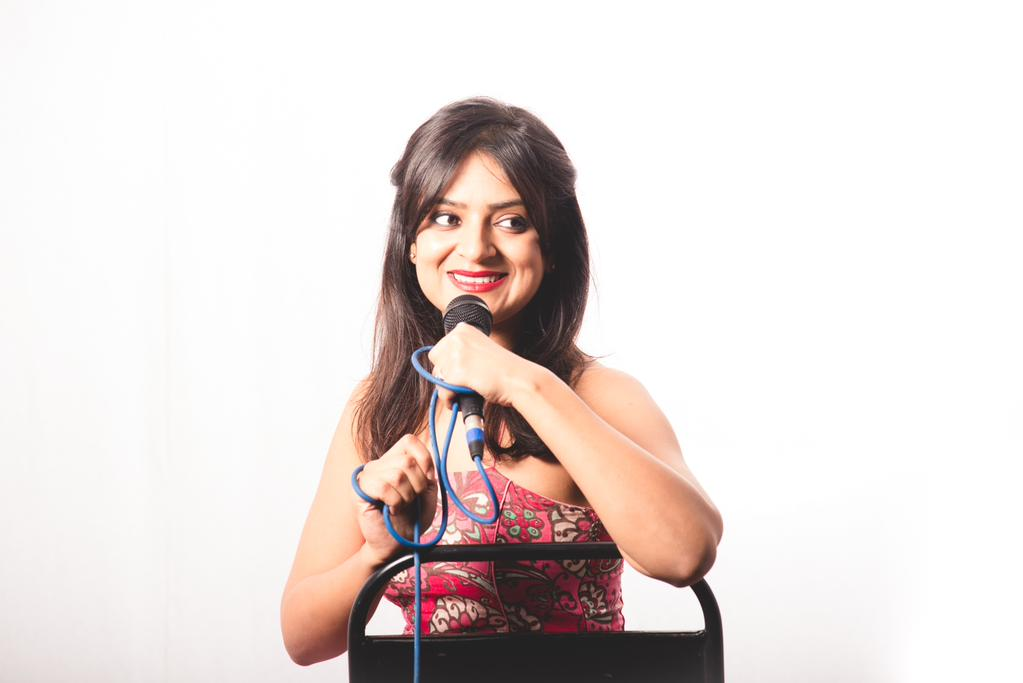
- Surka in 2018
- Born: Kaneez-e-Fatema Surka; 28 October 1983 (age 42); Umtata, Transkei
- Education: Rhodes University (B.A.)
- Notable work: The Week That Wasn't; The General Fun Game Show; All India Bakchod; Comicstaan

Comedy career
- Years active: 2006–present
- Genre: Improvisational comedy
- Website: Kaneez Surka on X

Kaneez-e-Fatema Surka (born 28 October 1983) is a South African improv comedian, actress, and YouTuber, based in India. She started her career with the show The Week That Wasn't. She has performed on various stand up platforms. She was a judge on the first two seasons of the Amazon Prime Video stand-up comedy reality show Comicstaan. She also hosts an online comedy game show, The General Fun Game Show on YouTube.

== Early and personal life ==
Kaneez-e-Fatema Surka was born on 28 October 1983 in Umtata, Transkei. She studied in DSG, Graham School and attended Rhodes University, where she obtained a Bachelor of Arts in law and psychology.

Ethnically a Gujarati, Kaneez Surka was born into a Muslim family originally from Kapadvanj, which allowed her to have a deep understanding of different cultures and religions.

In 2018, Surka accused comedian Aditi Mittal of sexual harassment, stating that Mittal had forcefully kissed her on the mouth. Mittal denied the accusation, leading to Surka publicly posting what had happened on Twitter. In October 2018, Mittal said that "she gave the improv artiste, who was hosting an open mic, a peck on the lips as a joke, as a part of the act" and apologised later to Surka when she realised "the discomfort she had caused".

== Career ==
Surka was part of the Mumbai improv scene since 2009. Her initial work in Mumbai was with Divya Palat's Imps troupe. Surka was co-director of a Mumbai-based story-telling club "Tall Tales" in 2013.

She achieved mainstream popularity on the satirical news show The Week That Wasn't on CNN-News18 (formerly CNN-IBN). She also worked with Weirdass Comedy, a Vir Das venture and then began collaborating with and making appearances in several All India Bakchod videos including roles such as Clitika from "A Woman's Besties", "Honest Weddings", "Honest Bars & Restaurants" and the Instagram character from "If Apps Were People". She also teaches the art of improv comedy, proving her comedic skills by being on the judge panel in Amazon Prime's stand-up comedy reality show Comicstaan and Improv All Stars: Game Night for Amazon Prime Video and Queens Of Comedy for TLC. Surka is part of an improv group called "The Improvisers" along with Abish Mathew, Kanan Gill, and Kenny Sebastian, and has released an improv special titled Something From Nothing on Amazon Prime Video. She started hosting the reality show The General Fun Game Show on her YouTube channel in 2017.

Surka moved to New York in 2022 to advance her standup career and performed her standup special I Found My People. She moved back to India and resumed her reality show The General Fun Game Show.

== Filmography ==
Year	Title	Platform	Role
2005	Dosti: Friends Forever	Film	Anjali's friend
2014-2015	The Living Room	TV series	
2015-2016	Various AIB videos	YouTube	
2016	Better Life Foundation	TV series	Plays Vashma Chandi (1 episode)
2017	Son of Abish	YouTube	Herself with Swara Bhaskar (Season 3 Episode 7)
2018	The Improvisers: Something from Nothing	Amazon Prime	Herself
2018-2019	Comicstaan	Amazon Prime	Judge
2020	Ladies Up	Netflix	Herself
2021	Comedy Premium League	Netflix	Herself
2025	I Found My People	YouTube	Debut standup special
