= Kanan Gill =

Indian stand-up comedian, actor and YouTuber

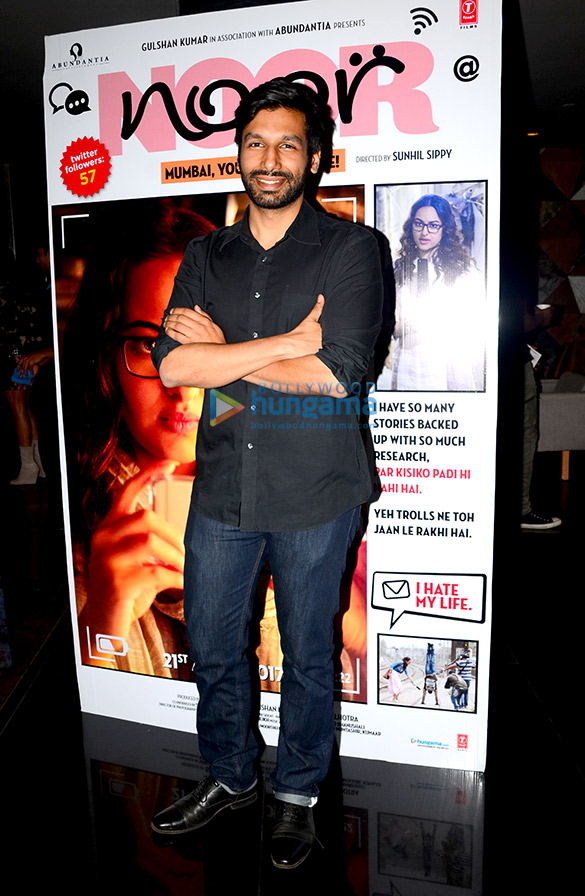
- Kanan Gill in May 2019
- Born: 24 December 1989 (age 36); Bareilly, Uttar Pradesh, India
- Education: MSRIT (B.E.)
- Occupations: Comedian actor youtuber
- Years active: 2013–present

Kanan Singh Gill is an Indian comedian, actor, author and YouTuber. He won the Punch Line Bangalore Competition. He is known for the YouTube series Pretentious Movie Reviews where he reviews campy Bollywood films along with fellow stand-up comedian Biswa Kalyan Rath. He was one of the main personalities behind the YouTube Comedy Hunt and he also co-hosted the YouTube FanFest India. In 2017, he released his own one-hour comedy special, Keep It Real on Amazon Prime Video. He made his debut on the big screen with the film Noor, alongside Sonakshi Sinha. In 2018, he was also a judge on Comicstaan, a comedic reality TV show, on Amazon Prime Video. He released his new special Is This It? on YouTube in 2024.

== Early life ==
Kanan was born in Bareilly to a Sikh family and spent his early years in Dehradun and Delhi. His father Charanjit Singh Gill, an officer with the Indian Army was also the principal of Rashtriya Military School, Bangalore. At an early age, he moved to Bengaluru with his family. He did his schooling at Ahlcon Public School, New Delhi, and The Frank Anthony Public School, Bengaluru. He pursued a B.E. degree in Computer Science at MS Ramaiah Institute of Technology. He was a part of a band where he later became the lead singer when he started writing humorous songs.

== Career ==
Kanan worked as a software engineer at Exeter Group, Inc., for three years. In the meantime, he participated in and won a competition called Punchline Bangalore, followed by another win at the Comedy Store in Mumbai. He then quit his job to pursue a career in comedy.

He gained popularity with a YouTube series, Pretentious Movie Reviews. He reviewed critically panned Hindi movies along with Biswa Kalyan Rath. Kanan also worked in an improvised sketch comedy show, The Living Room, on Comedy Central. Gill made his acting debut in Sunhil Sippy's Noor in 2017, alongside Sonakshi Sinha. The same year, Gill launched his special Keep It Real on Amazon Prime Video. In 2020, his special Yours Sincerely was released on Netflix. He released two more specials, Is This It? (2023) and What Is This? (2025), directly on YouTube, and is currently touring with a show named "Not This Again". In 2023, he also starred in the Norwegian romantic comedy called Christmas As Usual alongside Ida Ursin-Holm.

In 2024, HarperCollins released Acts of God, Gill's debut novel. It is a comedy-science fiction story based on a short story that he wrote in 2016–17.

== Filmography ==
=== Film ===
Year	Film	Role	Language	Notes	Ref
2017	Noor	Saad Sehgal	Hindi		
2023	Aachar & Co	—	Kannada	Co-writer	
2023	Christmas As Usual	Jashan Joshi	Norwegian; English		

=== Web ===
Year	Name	Platform	Notes
2017	Keep It Real	Amazon Prime Video	Stand-Up Comedy Special
2016–2019	Better Life Foundation	YouTube	Produced by Them Boxer Shorts; Released by All India Bakchod
2014–present	Pretentious Movie Reviews	YouTube	
2014–present	I Can Do That	YouTube	
2014–present	How Insensitive	YouTube	
2014–2017	Son of Abish	YouTube	Season 1
2014–2017	Son of Abish	YouTube	Season 2 with Biswa Kalyan Rath
2014–2017	Son of Abish	YouTube	Season 3 with Sonakshi Sinha
2018	The Improvisers: Something From Nothing	Amazon Prime Video	Alongside Kenny Sebastian, Abish Mathew, Kaneez Surka
2018-2019	Comicstaan	Amazon Prime Video	Judge
2019	Sketchy Behaviour	Amazon Prime Video	
2020	Yours Sincerely, Kanan Gill	Netflix	Stand-Up Comedy Special
2023	Is This It?	Paytm Insider, YouTube	Stand-Up Comedy Special
2024	Dil Dosti Dilemma	Amazon Prime Video	Role: Nasir Akhtar; Episode 4: Keeping Secrets; Episode 6: The Celebration
2026	What is this?	YouTube	Stand-Up Comedy Special
