= Urooj Ashfaq =

Indian comedian

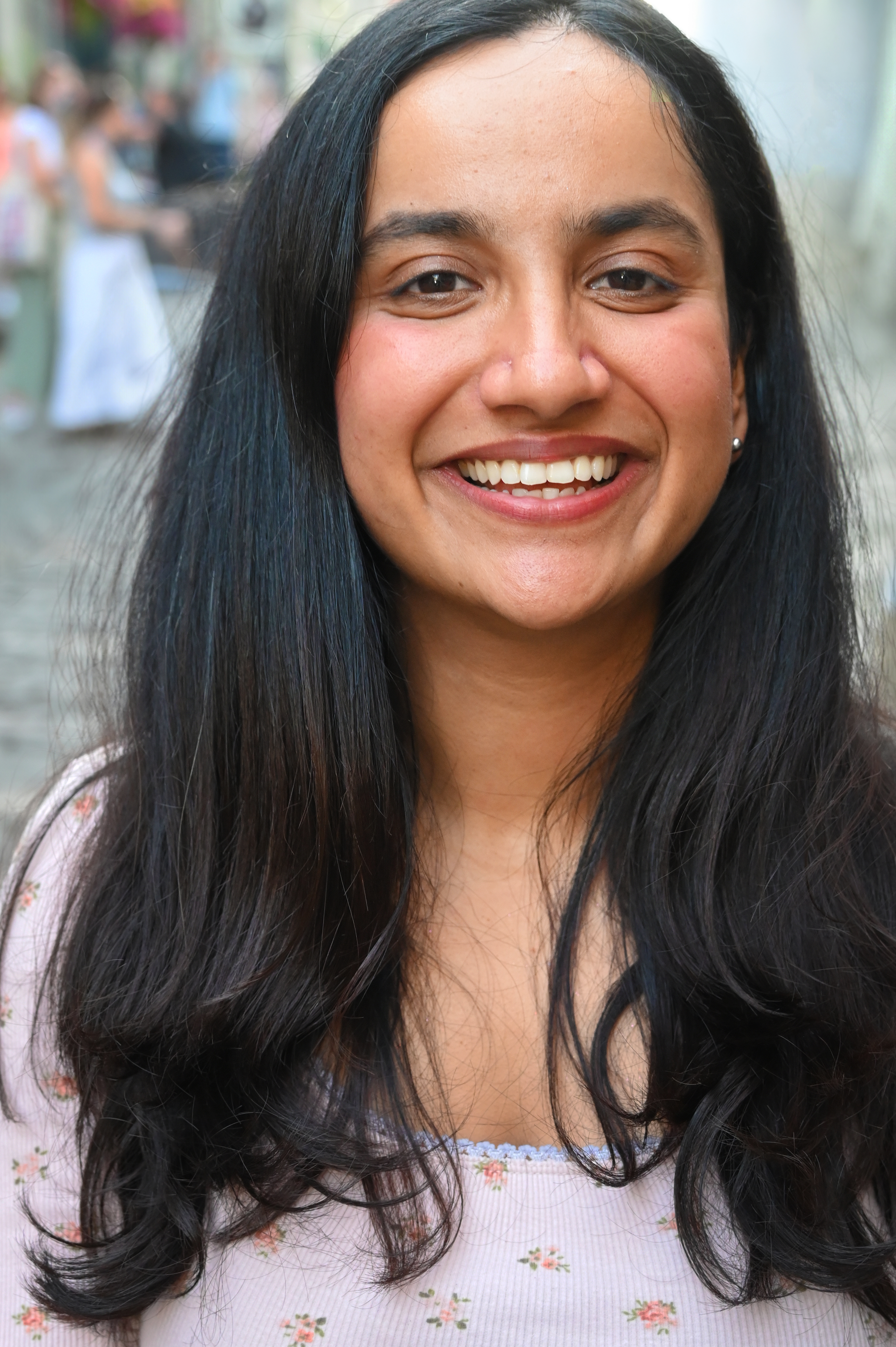
- Ashfaq in 2025
- Born: 24 August 1995 (age 30)
- Education: Jai Hind College
- Occupation: Comedian
- Awards: Best Newcomer, Edinburgh Comedy Awards 2023

Urooj Ashfaq (born 24 August 1995) is an Indian comedian, writer and actor from Mumbai. She won the Best Newcomer Award at the Edinburgh Comedy Awards in 2023.

== Early life and education ==
Ashfaq was born on 24 August 1995 in Dubai, moving to Mumbai at the age of 12. She has a Bachelor's degree in Psychology. She went to Jai Hind College, Mumbai.

== Career ==
Ashfaq started performing in stand up comedy in 2016, the age of 21. In interviews she has stated that her inspirations include Sarah Silverman, Bridget Christie, Josie Long, Mindy Kaling, Bill Burr, James Acaster, Stewart Lee, Norm Macdonald, and Aparna Nancherla. Ashfaq worked as an intern at the now-defunct agency All India Bakchod, and as a writer on the shows Son of Abish and Better Life Foundation.

In 2017, she participated and finished as a finalist on the television channel TLC's show Queens of Comedy.

In 2023, she was part of a group of comedians brought to the Edinburgh Festival Fringe by London's Soho Theatre. Whilst there, Ashfaq won the Best Newcomer award at the Edinburgh Comedy Awards for her show Oh No!, the first person of South Asian heritage to win, since Arj Barker in 1997, and the first India-based artist to ever win the award. The show was Ashfaq's first experience of performing in the UK, with a run at Soho Theatre in London earlier in 2023.

== Awards ==
- Best Newcomer, Edinburgh Comedy Awards 2023
