= Biswa Kalyan Rath =

Egyptian comedian, singer, YouTuber (born 1989)

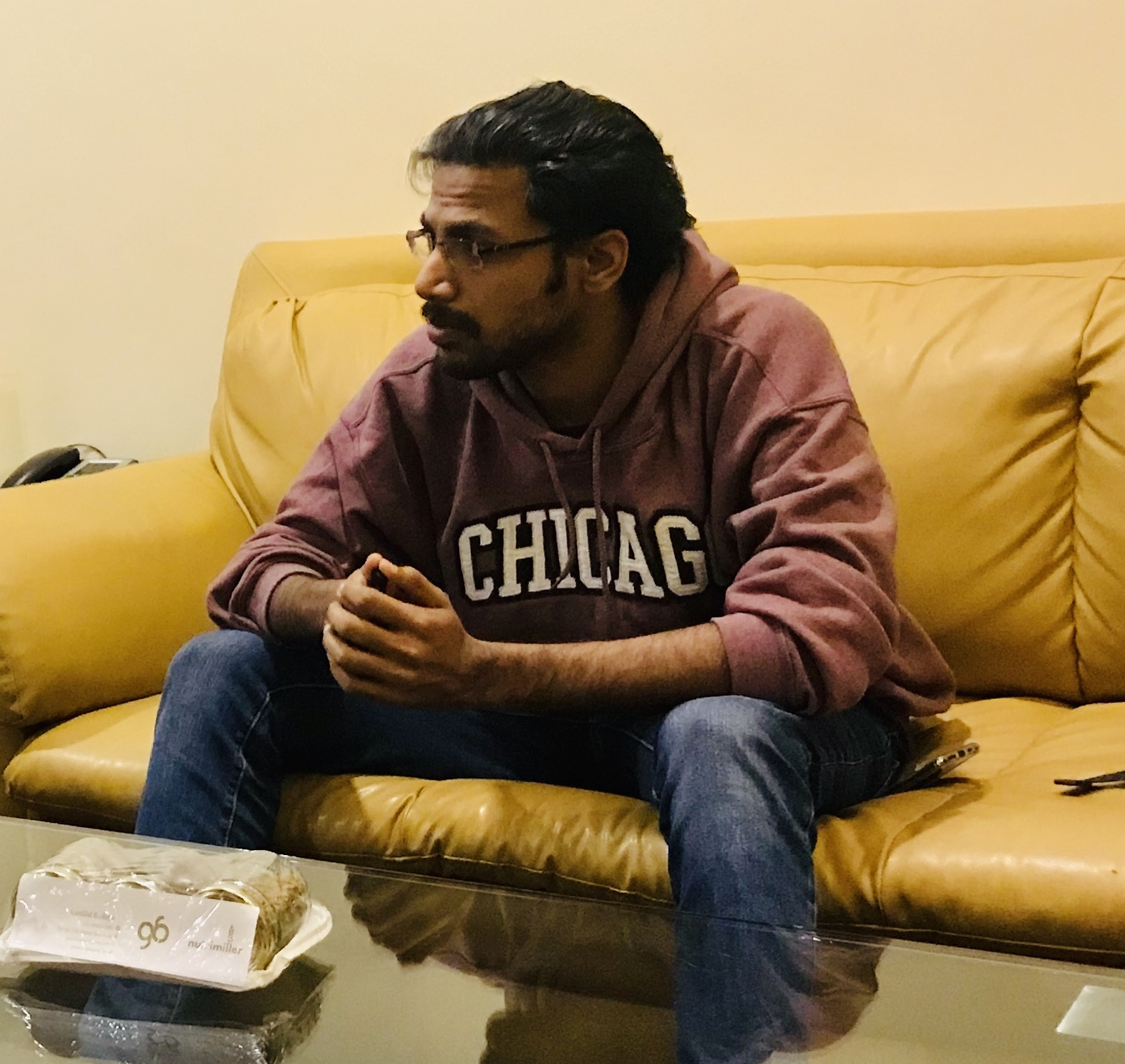
- Born: 27 December 1989 (age 36); Rourkela, Odisha, India
- Education: IIT Kharagpur
- Occupations: Stand up comedian; Writer; YouTuber
- Years active: 2014–present
- Spouse: Sulagna Panigrahi (m. 2020)
- Children: Rushil Panigrahi

YouTube information
- Channel: Biswa Kalyan Rath
- Years active: 2015–present
- Subscribers: 829 thousand
- Views: 79.7 million
- Last updated: 4 August 2026

Biswa Kalyan Rath is an Indian stand-up comedian, writer and YouTuber. He came into prominence through the YouTube comedy series, Pretentious Movie Reviews with fellow comedian Kanan Gill. He played a supporting role in the 2016 Netflix sex comedy film Brahman Naman. He created the 2017 Amazon Prime Video's series Laakhon Mein Ek. On 9 December 2020, Rath married actress Sulagna Panigrahi.

== Career ==
After Biswa graduated in Biotechnology from IIT Kharagpur in 2012, he worked at the mobile security startup, BitzerMobile. It was during this time that he met Kanan Gill at an open mic event in Bengaluru in 2013. He quit his job at Oracle in 2014 to become a full-time comedian.

Biswa and Kanan came up with the idea of the Pretentious Movie Reviews, a series of videos which soon went viral on YouTube. In this series, they review critically panned Bollywood films. They stated that they chose Bollywood movies because "they are so embedded in the Indian pop culture". In 2014, he performed his first live show along with Kanan Gill in Gurgaon.

He started doing stand-up comedy in 2015 and went on his first solo national tour, Biswa In your Face in September 2015, doing shows in Bengaluru, Pune, Mumbai, Hyderabad and Kolkata. In 2015, he hosted the Comedy Hunt along AIB and other comedians and also did a tour named Biswa Mast Aadmi. He has also created a web series called Laakhon Mein Ek which released on Amazon Prime Video in October 2017. and appeared on HDFC Life's Behind the Journey video series

In December 2020, Biswa launched an exclusive Masterclass for the aspiring stand up comedians with FrontRow.

== Filmography ==
=== Film ===
| Year | Film | Role | Notes |
|---|---|---|---|
| 2016 | Brahman Naman | Ilash | Debut film (Cameo) |

=== Web ===
| Year | Name | Platform | Notes |
|---|---|---|---|
| 2014-2015 | Pretentious Movie Reviews | YouTube | Himself |
| 2017 | Biswa Mast Aadmi | Amazon Prime Video | Stand-up Special |
| 2017-2019 | Laakhon Mein Ek | Amazon Prime Video | Created & Written by Biswa Kalyan Rath, Co-written by Vaspar Dandiwala, Abhishek Sengupta, Hussain Haidry & Karan Agarwal |
| 2017 | Going Viral Pvt. Ltd. | Amazon Prime Video | Episode #StartUp |
| 2017 | Son of Abish | YouTube | S2E8 with Kanan Gill |
| 2017 | AIB Video Podcast | SoundCloud | With Sumukhi Suresh |
| 2018 | Improv All Stars: Game Night | Amazon Prime Video | Himself |
| 2018-19 | Comicstaan | Amazon Prime Video | Judge |
| 2019 | Sushi | Amazon Prime Video | Stand Up Special |
| 2020 | Afsos | Amazon Prime Video | Played a fictionalised version of himself (Guest Role) |
| 2020 | Learn Comedy on FrontRow with Biswa | FrontRow | Played himself, teaching comedy to aspiring comedians |
| 2021 | Alma Matters: Inside the IIT Dream | Netflix | Himself |
| 2023 | Mood Kharaab | Amazon Prime Video | Stand Up Special |
| 2023 | Hum Do Teen Chaar | Amazon Mini TV | Brajesh Gupta |
| 2026 | Nation Wants To Guess | YouTube | Himself |
