= MeToo movement in India =

Movement against sexual abuse and harassment

The Indian #MeToo movement began in late 2018 and manifested in areas of Indian society including the government, the media, and the Bollywood film industry. In India, the MeToo movement is seen as either an independent outgrowth influenced by the international campaign against sexual harassment of women in the workplace, or an offshoot of the American MeToo movement. MeToo began gaining prominence in India with the increasing popularity of the international movement, and later gathered sharp momentum in October 2018 in the entertainment industry of Bollywood, centered in Mumbai, when actress Tanushree Dutta accused Nana Patekar of sexual harassment. This led to many women in the news media, Indian films, and even within the government to speak out and bring allegations of sexual harassment against a number of perpetrators.

== Origins in India ==
=== Influence of Hollywood's " MeToo" Movement ===
MeToo movement was founded by Tarana Burke but began as a social phenomenon in October 2017 as a hashtag started by American actress Alyssa Milano who shared her story of sexual assault against Harvey Weinstein. Shortly afterward, women from across the world began talking about their sex crime victim survivor stories. In India, however, the MeToo movement didn't gain much traction until actress Tanushree Dutta spoke up against actor Nana Patekar. Soon, the names of actor Alok Nath and journalist and politician MJ Akbar also began surfacing.

After allegations against Harvey Weinstein, the use of the #MeToo hashtag on social spread quickly in India, where sexual harassment is commonly referred to by the word 'eve-teasing', a term described as misleading, tame, and diluting the seriousness of the crime. In response to #MeToo, there have been attempts to teach Indian women about workplace rights and safe reporting, as well as educating men about the scope of the problem. Some have likened #MeToo to a 2012 social movement which followed a violent gang rape in New Delhi that later resulted in a woman's death, which caused the Indian government to institute harsher punishments for rape. Others have suggested there was underlying public anger over a Delhi rape conviction that was overturned by Judge Ashutosh Kumar a month before against filmmaker and writer Mahmood Farooqui, ruling that a "feeble no" was not enough to revoke consent because it was typical for one partner to be less willing. The case was appealed to the Supreme Court, which rejected the appeal against the acquittal of the filmmaker by the High Court of Delhi, saying, "We will not interfere with the high court verdict. It is a well-written judgment." Activist Jasmeen Patheja, head of Blank Noise, stated #MeToo's power is in demonstrating India can no longer ignore the scope of the problem. Kaimini Jaiswal, a lawyer at the Supreme Court of India, stressed the importance of teaching women how to read, especially in rural villages, because most women in these areas are illiterate and completely financially and emotionally dependent on a male relative.

Blogger Sheena Dabolkar's viral #MeToo tweet resulted in the boycott of Khodu Irani's popular Pune pub High Spirits, by several well-known performers. Several women mentioned Mahesh Murthy, which initiated a police case in January 2018. Trends Desk of The Indian Express wrote that many Indian men are speaking up as a part of #MeToo, including discussions about consent and how some men are also abused. Rina Chandran of Reuters said #MeToo is ignoring the 600,000 women in India who are currently sex workers against their will, and are typically poor without education or family.

There were reports of mass sexual assaults during the 2018 New Year's celebrations in Bengaluru, which have been associated with #MeToo. The incidents were initially dismissed by the police until someone uploaded CCTV footage of the assaults to social media. Home Minister G. Parameshwara, Abu Azmi, and other officials came under fire for stating "western" women's clothing and values were the cause of the rapes, and indicated women's families should not allow them to go to parties or major celebrations.

Several lists of alleged rapists and harassers started spreading on social media in India, including "The List", which initially included the names of about 60 highly respected academic men. The List was posted on 24 October 2017 by activist Inji Pennu and an Indian student in California named Raya Sarkar, who alleged they personally confirmed every incident. This list has resulted in criticism against #MeToo because the allegations were unverified before they started spreading on social media. Some of the victims from the list have come forward to explain they were ignored, mistreated, or retaliated against when they tried to pursue action. Sarkar has defended The List, saying that she posted it only to warn her friends about professors and academics to avoid (mostly upper-caste men), and had no idea it would become so popular. A second list came out a week later that was made by women from lower caste backgrounds and included more names, bringing the total up to around 70.

Twelve prominent Indian feminists dismissed The List in a formal letter, saying they understand that the justice system is typically tilted against victims, but unverified claims make things harder for the feminist movement. Writers Rhea Dangwal and Namrata Gupta responded that most victims from the list were poor students who tried to go through official channels without success or recourse, while every single man on the list has the ability to defend himself socially and legally.

=== Tanushree Dutta's allegations ===
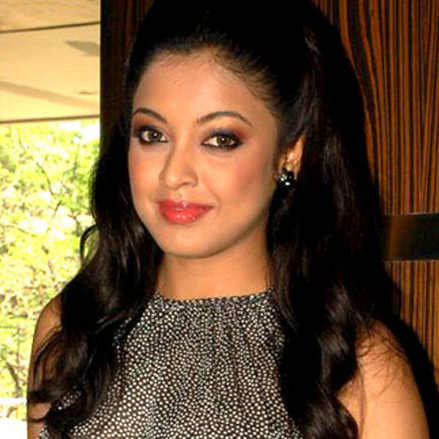
Actress Tanushree Dutta's allegations of sexual harassment in 2018 was a catalyst of the " MeToo" movement in India

On 26 September 2018, after having been out of the Bollywood spotlight for about a decade, actress Tanushree Dutta gave an interview to Zoom TV in which she publicly accused Nana Patekar of sexually harassing her on the set of the 2009 movie Horn 'Ok' Pleassss. This declaration would be seen as the catalyst of the MeToo movement in India, similar to one which happened in the U.S. a year earlier with Harvey Weinstein, in which more and more women in the entertainment industry would publicly expose high-profile individuals who had sexually exploited them. Dutta had first made the allegations against Patekar in 2008, filing a complaint with the 'CINTAA' (Cine & TV Artists Association), but no action was taken as the case was considered a criminal case. The allegation was repeated in 2013 in an interview, and again largely ignored. It was not until her September 2018 statements that the CINTAA apologized to Dutta, admitting that the "chief grievance of sexual harassment wasn't even addressed [in 2008]", but added that since the case was more than three years old, they could not reopen it.

Janice Sequeira, a journalist, backed her allegations, claiming to be an eyewitness to the incident. She also alleged that filmmaker Vivek Agnihotri had told her to remove her clothes and dance with Irrfan Khan to act on the sets of Chocolate. She said Irrfan Khan and Suniel Shetty stood up for her during this episode. Vivek refuted all such allegations and shared that it is an attempt to get publicity by Tanushree Dutta and to malign his image in a legal notice sent to her. The assistant director of Chocolate, Sattyajit Gazmer, also denied Tanushree's claims.

In an interview, Tanushree said "He (Nana Patekar) called the MNS (Maharashtra Navnirman Sena) party to bash up my car. He was behind everything and was supported by choreographer Ganesh Acharya". In a video from 2008 that went viral on the internet, goons are seen thrashing Tanushree's car. A journalist named Pawan Bharadwaj, was seen thrashing the car's windshield with his camera, and later clarified that he attacked her car because earlier, he had a fight with Dutta's team. A defamation case was filed against her for her comments about the MNS party. She was also served with two legal notices from Nana Patekar and Vivek Agnihotri. On 6 October 2018, Dutta filed an FIR at Oshiwara police station against actor Nana Patekar, director Rakesh Sarang, choreographer Ganesh Acharya, and producer Sami Siddiqui.

In mid-October, Dutta sought the help of the Maharashtra State Women's Commission (MSWC) in order to conduct a full-scale investigation on the issue; they sent notices to Nana Patekar, director Rakesh Sarang and choreographer Ganesh Acharya, whom they directed to respond within 10 days. On 16 November, several weeks after the MSWC issued a warning to Patekar, his lawyer released a statement refuting the allegations, stating, "All allegations against him (Nana Patekar) are false and far from the truth". Vijaya Rahatkar, the chairperson of Maharashtra State Commission for Women, confirmed that the commission had received the reply from Patekar. She, however, did not disclose the contents of the letter. Patekar’s lawyer, Aniket Nikam, said, “All allegations against him are false and far from the truth.’’

In June 2019, the Mumbai Police closed the case after informing the courts that there was no evidence to prosecute Patekar.

== Impact ==
Notable people (in India) who have shared their " MeToo" stories publicly include:

- Yashika Aannand
- Jasmin Bhasin
- Sangeetha Bhat
- Priyanka Bose
- Chinmayi
- Amyra Dastur
- Tina Datta
- Tanushree Dutta
- Sanjjanaa Galrani
- Sruthi Hariharan
- Nishtha Jain
- Ketki Joshi
- Mandana Karimi
- Aahana Kumra
- Leena Manimekalai
- Sona Mohapatra
- Sandhya Mridul
- Navneet Nishan
- Elnaaz Norouzi
- Shweta Pandit
- Amala Paul
- Kangana Ranaut
- Soni Razdan
- Sri Reddy Mallidi
- Flora Saini
- Shama Sikander
- Niharika Singh
- Diandra Soares
- Sunaina
- Kaneez Surka
- Ira Trivedi
- Sonal Vengurlekar
- Rachel White
- Kubbra Sait

=== Entertainment ===
==== Phantom Films ====
In October 2018, in an interview with Huffington Post India, a former employee of Phantom Films accused director Vikas Bahl of sexually harassing her on the set of the 2014 film Queen. Later, the film's lead actress Kangana Ranaut, in support of the former employee, also accused Bahl of sexual misconduct. Following this, Nayani Dixit, Ranaut's co-star in the movie, levelled similar accusations against Bahl. As a result, Phantom Films announced its dissolution on 5 October 2018, largely in response to the sexual assault allegation against Bahl by another former Phantom employee, which was reported in 2015. The other three founders, Kashyap, Motwane, and Mantena, all issued statements on Twitter confirming the company's disbanding and moving on to independent projects.

==== Utsav Chakraborty And All India Bakchod (AIB) ====
On 7 October 2018, stand-up comedian and popular YouTuber Utsav Chakraborty, who worked as a freelancer with the comedy group All India Bakchod, was accused of sending women lewd messages and photos via social messaging apps. The allegations against Utsav blew up when a Twitter user named Mahima Kukreja put up a Twitter post accusing the comedian of sending her an unsolicited picture of his genitalia and then pleading with her not to make his act public as it would "ruin" his career. Several comedians within his circle, including Kunal Kamra and Tanmay Bhat, knew about his habit of harassing underage girls but opted to keep quiet and work with him. On 8 October 2018, Gursimran Khamba provided clarification on some sexual harassment allegations reported by an unknown girl who claimed Khamba had sexually assaulted her. Khamba, on the other hand, denied the allegation, claiming that the relationship was consensual. On 10 October 2018, comedienne Kaneez Surka accused Aditi Mittal, who had appeared on the All India Bakchod Knockout, of 'forcefully kissing her on her mouth without consent' and that she was triggered by Mittal championing the cause of the movement. On 16 October 2018, Yash Raj Films (YRF) terminated the services of Ashish Patil, who was their Vice-President of Brand Partnerships and Talent Management, and Business and Creative Head for Y Films, after he was accused of forcibly kissing and making advances on an anonymous aspiring actress. The anonymous woman texted her #MeToo story to an activist who tweeted screenshots with the woman's permission.

In May 2019, the group announced that they had to let go of their entire team in the wake of the controversy and that their YouTube channel would remain inactive indefinitely. While Bhat's suspension was lifted, he was barred from holding the position of CEO and Khamba was let go of. Rohan Joshi and Ashish Shakya the remaining two members too would pursue independent careers.

==== Housefull 4 ====
On 12 October 2018, after accusations from several women of abusive and perversive sexual behavior, director Sajid Khan announced that he would step back from the production of his upcoming film Housefull 4 until he could clear his name. Actor Akshay Kumar also made a statement on Twitter, confirming Sajid's stepping away and also halting shooting of the film until further notice. Later in the day, actor Nana Patekar noted that he would also be leaving the film, due to accusations against him by ex-actress Tanushree Dutta. On 14 October, it was announced that Farhad Samji, who co-directed Housefull 3, would be replacing Sajid Khan as the director. On 15 October 2018, The Indian Film and Television Directors’ Association issued a show cause notice to Khan, which read "Your...actions have brought disrepute to Indian Film and Television Directors’ Association,". It further noted that they expected an explanation from Khan "for such offensive behaviour within seven days of the receipt of the notice for further action as per the rules and regulations… In case of no reply, ex-parte decision would be taken."

In December 2018, Sajid Khan was suspended from IFTDA (Indian Film and Television Director's Association) for one year, following the accusations of sexual assault against him from three women. A source from the association said that IFTDA "investigated the complaints in the spirit of POSH Act," and said that Khan did not offer an explanation as to his actions even when given an opportunity to do so, however he did expose his "real self" in an earlier interview where he admitted to his actions.

==== Fox Star Studios India ====
On 19 October 2018, casting director and first-time film director Mukesh Chhabra was suspended by the Fox Star Studios India company from directing their Bollywood remake of The Fault in Our Stars (titled Kizie Aur Manny, later Dil Bechara) pending an inquiry against him over sexual harassment allegations. Chhabra has denied the charges, telling a newspaper that he would pursue "every possible legal action to protect my reputation." In a statement, Fox Star Studios said that Chhabra was suspended until "the Internal Complaints Committee of Mukesh Chhabra Casting Company concludes its inquiry into the allegations against him."

==== Alok Nath v. Vinta Nanda ====
In October 2018, veteran character actor Alok Nath was accused of rape by TV producer Vinta Nanda who worked with him in the TV show Tara in the mid-1990s. Alok Nath has denied the allegation. Subsequently, actresses Renuka Shahane, Himani Shivpuri, Sandhya Mridul, and Deepika Amin have either admitted to knowing about Nath's predatory behaviour or written about instances where they themselves have been assaulted by him. On 15 October 2018, Nath sued Nanda for defamation, asking for a written apology and ₹1 as compensation. He has filed the case jointly with his wife Ashu Nath. The Cine and TV Artists Association (CINTAA) sent Mr. Nath a show cause notice on Vinta Nanda's post. The association asked why he should not be expelled from CINTAA. The actor urged that the notice be withdrawn, that he was innocent until proven guilty. In response to Alok Nath's lawsuit, on 15 October Vinta Nanda's lawyer responded: "She will not be intimidated by threats and defamation suits which are primarily meant to delay and distract from the gravity of the allegations." Alok Nath had earlier been quoted by ABP News as saying he could "neither deny nor agree" with Ms Nanda's account of rape and violation on Facebook. The writer had not named him but had identified him as the "Sanskaari actor" who played the lead on her show "Tara".

On 14 November 2018, the CINTAA expelled Alok Nath from their organization after he failed to appear at a body meeting on 12 November to discuss his rape accusations against Vinta Nanda, and instead sent a response to the 'show-cause' notice instead. CINTAA secretary general Sushant Singh noted that the group's EC (Executive Committee) "unanimously voted him out." When asked if the organization should have allowed its Internal Complaints Committee (ICC) to handle the case, Singh responded that the ICC had not yet been completely trained in POSH (Prevention of Sexual Harassment) on how to "hear cases, take a deposition, cross-question, among many other things," and that they had to follow their "current provisions" for now. Nanda responded to the expulsion by applauding the decision, saying that "at the end of the day we all have to acknowledge that we are answerable and accountable to our governing bodies. It’s only then, that institutions like CINTAA, IFTDA (Indian Film & Television Directors’ Association) and Screenwriters Association (SWA) will achieve the status they deserve."

==== KWAN Entertainment ====
On 16 October 2018, entertainment talent management agency KWAN announced that founder Anirban Blah had been asked to step down after four women publicly accused him of harassment. In a statement, KWAN said," We have asked Anirban Blah to forthwith step aside from his duties, activities and responsibilities at KWAN, its subsidiaries and affiliates with immediate effect." The company, which promotes high-profile celebrities such as Deepika Padukone, Tiger Shroff, and Ranbir Kapoor, has a Prevention of Sexual Harassment committee in place.

==== Vairamuthu ====
Vairamuthu, Tamil poet, lyricist, author, and a recipient of various awards including the Padma Bhushan and Sahitya Akademi Award, was accused of sexual misconduct and sexual harassment by several women singers and artists from the Tamil film industry. A few women described their allegations anonymously, but singer Chinmayi used her Twitter account to highlight the instances of intimidation and harassment she suffered at his hands. Following this, Sindhuja Rajaram, an artist, photographer, and musician based in California, United States, also accused Vairamuthu and detailed the harassment she faced due to him. Vairamuthu remained noncommittal about the allegations against him on Twitter. On 15 October 2018, he made an official video statement saying that he found the allegations against him unfounded and challenged his accusers to take legal action against him.

==== Arjun Sarja ====
In October 2018, Sruthi Hariharan, a major actress of Kannada cinema, revealed multiple instances of actor Arjun Sarja's misbehaviour towards her. The actress revealed that Arjun had made unwelcome advances towards her during the making of Nibunan (2017), by often changing the script to include more physically intimate scenes.

==== Kailash Kher ====
Kher was called out for sexual misconduct by multiple women during IndianMeToo movement 2018.

==== Rajat Kapoor ====
In October 2018, Rajat Kapoor was accused of sexually harassing two women. Responding to the allegations, Kapoor apologised for his actions. His movie Kadakh was dropped from the MAMI Film Festival following the allegations.

==== Birju Maharaj ====
In January 2022, several Kathak performers accused Birju Maharaj of sexual abuse. Some of the accusers were minors at the time of the alleged abuse.

==== Anu Malik ====
On 21 October 2018, singer/composer/TV show judge Anu Malik was asked to step down from judging the reality TV show Indian Idol 10 after being accused of sexual harassment from multiple women. An assistant producer on Indian Idol 5, Danica D'Souza, has been reported as saying that the producers knew of Malik's harassing behaviour, but previously had not taken it seriously enough. D'Souza noted that "They knew he abused power but nothing came of it. In fact, they told us all to take precaution by not meeting him alone."

Later that day, Sony TV released an official statement regarding Malik's dismissal: "Anu Malik is no longer a part of the Indian Idol jury panel. The show will continue its planned schedule and we will invite some of the biggest names in Indian music as guests to join Vishal and Neha to judge Indian Idol season 10." Malik himself released a statement: "I, Anu Malik, have decided to take a break from Indian Idol as I am currently unable to focus on my work, my music and the show".

In the 1990s, singer Alisha Chinai had also accused Malik of molesting her, but faced legal challenges in doing so. She filed a case against him and demanded ₹2,660,000, whereas in return, Malik had filed a defamation case asking for ₹20,000,000 from Chinai. Chinai eventually won the legal battle in an "unprecedented landmark verdict", and a restraining order was passed against Malik. She vowed to never work with Malik again but eventually forgave him, and sang for him in a song in the film Ishq Vishq, which Malik musically directed; the two later judged a season of Indian Idol together.

Malik returned to the Indian Idol in 2019 and accusers expressed their anger all over again. Neha Bhasin and Shweta Pandit had also accused Malik of inappropriate behaviour.

==== Sajid Khan ====
In October 2018, Saloni Chopra spoke about being sexually harassed by Sajid Khan. In an interview aired on youtube channel of Zoom Saloni Chopra detailed her account of sexual harassment and misconduct by Sajid Khan. She also spoke about Sajid Khan sexually harassing other women in front of her. He is yet to comment on these allegations. In wake of these allegations several bollywood bigwigs publicly distanced themselves from him. He was also replaced by Farhad Samji as Director for Housefull 4. In December 2018, the Indian Film and Television Directors Association (IFTDA) announced that it was suspending Sajid Khan for a year due to the multiple sexual harassment allegations, by actresses Saloni Chopra and Rachel White and journalist Karishma Upadhyay.

After staying away from public eye for a year Sajid Khan returned to social media on April 16, 2020. His Instagram account as of June 24, 2020 has blocked users to post any comments.

==== Ashok Kumar Gopal Meena Vs State of Maharashtra ====
Ashok Kumar Gopal Meena (professionally known as Ashok Meena), a cinematographer known for his work on Rangbaaz, Masaba Masaba, and Against the Tide, was arrested on September 18th, 2023 by Versova Police Station (C.R. NO. 472/2023) and charged under Sec. 376, 1860 of the Indian Penal Code (IPC) for an alleged offence of rape (CNR NO. MHCC050050562023)

Additional Sessions Judge, Sessions Court, Borivali Division, Dindoshi, rejected Ashok Meena's bail application on October 23rd 2023, citing the serious nature of the charges, which carry the possibility of life imprisonment. Ashok Meena was subsequently sent to Arthur Road Jail (CNR NO. MHCC050050562023 )

On December 12, 2023, Ashok Meena was granted conditional bail by the court. He was directed not make any contact with the victim by any means and not tamper the prosecution witnesses in anyway(CNR NO. MHCC050058282023).

As of June 2025, the case remains ongoing.

=== News and media ===
- After multiple allegations of sexual harassment, psychological torture, and sending explicit material, the resident editor of the Times of India (a leading publication in the country), K.R. Sreenivas, resigned on 13 October 2018.
- On 8 October, Prashant Jha stepped down as the Chief of Bureau and Political Editor of the Hindustan Times, a leading daily newspaper, after charges of sexual harassment filed against him by a former employee.
- On 14 October 2018, film director Nishtha Jain, in a Facebook post, accused The Wire anchor Vinod Dua of stalking, slobbering, and sexually harassing her in June 1989. Dua's daughter Mallika Dua said that she will let her father fight his battle and will stand by him. On 17 October, Dua, in a statement on the sexual harassment accusation against him, mocked the #MeToo movement as "trivial" in an election year in the latest episode of his The Wire show Jan Gan Man Ki Baat. Dua said he was suspending his show for a week for The Wire to probe the sexual harassment allegation against him.
- On 10 October, Stalin K of Video Volunteers was accused by an intern from the Tata Institute of Social Sciences, Mumbai, of sexual misconduct. Subsequently, TISS has issued an advisory dissociating itself from him and Video Volunteers. After this, several other instances of sexual harassment have also surfaced in the media, and they are currently under investigation by the ICC of Video Volunteers.

=== Politics and law ===
==== Minister of State (MOS) of External Affairs ====
In October 2018, MJ Akbar, India's Minister of state for External Affairs, was accused of sexual harassment by several female colleagues. At least ten allegations have emerged against Akbar, the first public servant in high office to be accused. Akbar's colleagues, including Smriti Irani and Maneka Gandhi, have acknowledged the online testimonies against him and called for a probe. The Ministry of Women and Child Development announced that a panel would be set up to examine the existing legal framework for harassment at work.

In mid-October, a 41-page letter was written to Delhi's chief metropolitan magistrate by Akbar, which accused journalist Priya Ramani of defaming him on scandalous grounds. Ramani said she was "deeply disappointed" with Akbar's decision to take legal action against her. Ramani faced up to two years in prison if Akbar was successful in the criminal defamation case. Bhawana Bisht, writing for SheThePeople.TV, described the case against Ramani as an example of a SLAPP lawsuit and "a way to drag the women to court and intimidate them until they withdraw." On February 10, 2021, The Quint published an overview of the defamation case in anticipation of the verdict on February 17, 2021.

On 16 October, journalist Tushita Patel (wife of Aakar Patel, director of Amnesty International India) published an article on Scroll.in detailing instances of sexual harassment by Akbar during meetings with him in the early 1990s, when Akbar was the editor-in-chief of the Deccan Chronicle, and Patel was a senior sub-editor. In a calmly indignant tone, Patel narrated separate incidents in which Akbar indecently exposed himself to her, and also forcibly kissed her, leaving her traumatized. She ended the article affirming the power of the solidarity and union of his female victims, who would be vocal against him in court proceedings: "The same sisterhood of solidarity that held our hands through the darkest times of our lives will come out only because you continue to be brazen. We are not confused, conflicted or vulnerable any more. Our time to speak is now – when we don’t have to run to a police station to lodge a complaint before anyone would give us a hearing." M.J. Akbar resigned from the post of Minister of State for External Affairs on 17 October, having decided to fight in a personal capacity the allegations made against him.

On 18 October, the Editors Guild of India posted an official statement that requested Akbar to withdraw his defamation case against his accusers, and also offered legal and other support to any of the affected women (present or in the future) in his case or others: "If any of them were to need legal advice or assistance, the Guild will do the best it can to help and also appeal to eminent lawyers to represent them pro bono."

Also on 18 October, Akbar's hearing for his defamation case began at the Patiala House Courts in Delhi. Akbar himself was not present, but was represented by Senior Advocate Geeta Luthra. Luthra said that "at this stage all that she has to show is that Akbar's reputation has suffered, and that the allegedly defamatory remarks were read by others." The court said that it would record his statement on 31 October 2018. On February 17, 2021, the court dismissed Akbar's complaint against Priya Ramani, stating the charges had not been proven. In the ruling, Judge Ravindra Kumar Pandey wrote, "Despite how well respected some persons are in the society, they in their personal lives, could show extreme cruelty to the females," and "The time has come for our society to understand the sexual abuse and sexual harassment and its implications on victims." Pandey continued, "The woman cannot be punished for raising (her) voice against the sex abuse on the pretext of criminal complaint of defamation, as the right of reputation cannot be protected at the cost of the right of life and dignity of woman as guaranteed in the Indian Constitution."

==== National Students Union of India (NSUI) national president ====
On 16 October 2018, Rahul Gandhi, president of the INC, accepted NSUI national president Fairoz Khan's resignation after a letter was sent saying he was accused of sexual harassment. He was accused by a female member of the INC from Chhattisgarh. INC had ordered a three-member committee to investigate the matter. Khan denied the charges but stated he was stepping down as it was hurting the party's image. Latter Three member committee found him innocent. The woman had first complained against Khan to Rahul Gandhi in June 2018. She also demanded protection, as she feared for her life.

==== Sexual Harassment Allegations against Chief Justice of India ====
In April 2019, Chief Justice of India Ranjan Gogoi was accused of sexual harassment by a former Supreme Court of India employee. A three-judge internal investigation committee had given him clean chit but was severely criticised for being opaque, unfair and one-sided, thus violating principles of natural justice. Gogoi described the allegation as an attempt to hamper the independence of the judiciary and a danger to democracy.

Several eminent personalities from legal fraternity including two retired Supreme Court justices questioned the in-house panel's decision.

In an opinion piece written in the Indian Express titled "A One Sided Justice", Justice Madan Lokur had commented that the Court was driven by an "institutional bias" while dismissing the allegations raised by the woman. Justice Jasti Chelameswar had said that the Supreme Court did not follow due process while hearing the sexual harassment charges against the Chief Justice of India.

=== Education ===
==== Symbiosis Centre for Media and Communication (SCMC) ====
Alumni of the Symbiosis Centre for Media and Communication (SCMC) in Pune took to social media to share harrowing accounts of harassment by some faculty members and their seniors; about 25 students and alumni of the college shared their ordeals, charging two faculty members and some senior students with harassment and molestation. They also said that the institution failed to take concrete action against the accused faculty members. Soon afterwards, SCMC authorities issued an apology on Facebook and promised an investigation by the Internal Complaints Committee (ICC).

Dr Vidya Yeravdekar, principal director of Symbiosis Society, said that the Symbiosis University Management is "doing its best to abide by UGC rules." He noted that a "high power internal complaints committee, consisting of the vice-chancellor, dean, registrar and the director of the institution, has been constituted." The committee, he said, will take necessary steps to investigate any claims and consequences.

On 21 October, the university decided to send Anupam Siddhartha, director of SCMC, on leave pending an inquiry. In the days prior, a petition had been signed by 106 students, both current students and alumni of SCMC, who gave "graphic details of years of alleged harassment and abuse at the hands of the SCMC director," as reported by NDTV. Vidya Yeravdekar, principal director of SIU, said, "There was already an internal complaints committee, which had been set up to look into the allegations raised in the past, some of which were against Siddhartha... some of the allegations were shocking and we immediately referred it to the ICC, who called him on Saturday for investigations. Based on the recommendation of the ICC, which has said that he should stay away from campus duties pending an inquiry, he will be sent on leave from Monday." The sexual harassment case was demised after a three month long investigation, though he was charged with disciplinary excessive issues. Sreeram Gopalkrishnan was then appointed the director of Symbiosis Centre for Media & Communication (SCMC).

==== Ambedkar University Delhi (AUD) ====
Lawrence Liang, professor at Ambedkar University Delhi (AUD) and then Dean of AUD's School of Law, Governance and Citizenship, was found by an inquiry committee to have sexually harassed a doctoral student on multiple occasions (beginning in April 2015) and removed from his position as Dean. The committee also reportedly observed that Liang had faced complaints of sexual harassment at the Alternative Law Forum (ALF), an NGO he founded and previously worked in. In response, the complainant (speaking anonymously to the press) criticised the punishment meted out by the committee as “inadequate” in light of the “repeat sexual assaults” she had allegedly suffered from. In contrast, Liang stated to the press that he "dispute[d] the report in its entirety, its findings and recommendations included”, and that he would “exhaust every channel open" to seek recourse. The ALF issued a statement saying that Liang had "left the Alternative Law Forum in March 2015" and had "now ceased to be a member of ALF’s Governing Body". Further, that ALF was "in the process of reviewing organisational policy to ensure that preventive and not merely punitive steps are taken towards addressing sexual harassment." In 2018, Liang filed a petition against AUD and the complainant contesting the findings made against him. Between 9 April and 30 March 2022, eight hearings have taken in the case with little progress, with hearings frequently adjourned for lack of time.

=== November 2018 Caravan Magazine Investigations ===
The November 2018 issue of Caravan, a prominent Indian news magazine, investigated at length three prominent cases of workplace sexual harassment: involving entertainment behemoth, Only Much Louder, prominent television journalist and anchor, Gaurav Sawant, and another famous artist, Jatin Das.

The charges against Only Much Louder - famous for starting the NH7 Weekender and the power behind comedy groups All India Bakchod and East India Comedy - included serial charges of sexual harassment against the company's co-founder, Vijay Nair. The story also detailed how the company failed in its internal handling of sexual harassment charges that came to its notice.

The same cover story also detailed a harrowing account of sexual misdemeanor by TV anchor, Gaurav Sawant, against journalist Vidya Krishnan. As per the account published in the magazine, Krishnan alleged that during a reporting trip to the Beas in Punjab, Sawant tried to repeatedly molest her. In the article, Krishnan says to Nikita Saxena, the author of the said article, "I was really excited about being counted, being sent from Pioneer with all the supposedly senior journalists," Sawant, who had earlier reported on the Kargil war in 1999, was part of the entourage Krishnan was travelling with. In the Army jeep, Sawant allegedly touched Krishnan on her right shoulder and slowly moved his hands to her breast, later on pretending as if nothing had happened.

"When the group returned to their hotel rooms in the evening, Vidya says she received a message from Gaurav that he wanted her to come to his room. When Vidya tried to brush him off politely, Gaurav reportedly said that what he had in mind was 'nothing naughty' and he 'just wanted to get into a bathtub with her.' Gaurav then came to her room unexpectedly, she says, and dropped his pants and tried to sexually assault her. She tried to push him away, but could not, Vidya says."

"I felt like he was overpowering me, which is why in my panic I started screaming," Vidya's response managed to drive Gaurav off, who pretended as if nothing had happened the next day.

== Challenges ==
India's MeToo movement differs in key ways from the movement in the United States. The allegations against Harvey Weinstein were investigated by reliable sources in the US, while in India, accusations emerged on social media, where women posted their grievances. In addition, laws against defamation in India allow the prosecution of women who are unable to prove their allegations, with a maximum jail term of two years, while the First Amendment protects such rights in the United States. As a result, activists began to work towards strengthening the Sexual Harassment of Women at Workplace (Prevention, Prohibition and Redressal) Act, 2013, which was implemented poorly since its establishment.

As of mid-October 2018, the social " MeToo" campaign of India has continued to grow and be covered by major media outlets as a topic of importance, with victims outing their abusers on a regular basis. The movement has since resulted in major social consequences for several of those accused, such as firing or resignation from their jobs, condemnation and disassociation from members of their respective industries, and indignation against their actions from their fans and/or the public at large. Similarly, accusers have also been the target of countersuits from the accused, even as they often have social support and added coverage from the media.

While the Indian MeToo movement brought stories of sexual harassment and abuse to the forefront, this likely reflects only a fraction of a much larger phenomenon. Scholar Shamika Dixit coined the term 'imagined constraints' to describe the limitations of social media platforms, which discouraged many Indian women from speaking out. Through interviews, she uncovered how women wanted to avoid the familial judgement, social stigma and emotional labour that came with participating in the MeToo movement. This ultimately constrained the agency of individual women to publicly voice their experiences.

== Criticism ==
Journalist Seema Mustafa has expressed encouragement for the women who have shared their personal experiences and has said that this is a big achievement for India's women's movement, but she has also felt that the movement lacks internal criticism, which would have been helpful in strengthening the cause. Tavleen Singh of The Indian Express has criticized the MeToo movement participants in India, claiming the 'liberals' leading the movement are illiberal towards disagreements with their point of view. Govind Krishnan V of Firstpost concurred with Mustafa's sentiments and additionally stated that one limitation of the movement in India was that it shuts itself from constructive criticism, which would help to strengthen the movement. As an analogy, he mentioned that feminism has evolved over time due to this type of criticism: " MeToo movement needs more nuanced and richer conversations which have space for debate, disagreement and dissent. The movement needs deeper forms of engagement and a collective will to develop a self-critical discourse which can generate essential kind of intellectual spade work."

Mustafa also expressed her reservations about the tone and tenor of the MeToo movement on social media. A key point of her criticism was the movement's 'inability to differentiate between a man who is guilty of rape and sexual assault from a man who solicited a woman with a drink, or an unacceptable text message', arguing it offers the same 'punishment' for all. Krishna too shared the viewpoint, writing, "This remains a challenge of great importance for India’s MeToo, which it has not yet succeeded in overcoming". Mustafa and Singh both said that the current movement in India is "exclusive, elite and metropolitan in nature", failing to represent ordinary Indians.

Mustafa has spoken of justice as a concept where an innocent man is not supposed to be framed, even if it means the guilty get away. She has rebuked the MeToo movement as "too subjective, arbitrary and without due responsibility". Mustafa has also criticized the "mob mentality" of the movement as the accusations on social media deny the accused a proper chance to defend themselves.

== See also ==
- Men Too movement (India)
- Gender inequality in India
