= Rebecca Mammen John =

Senior advocate in the Supreme Court of India

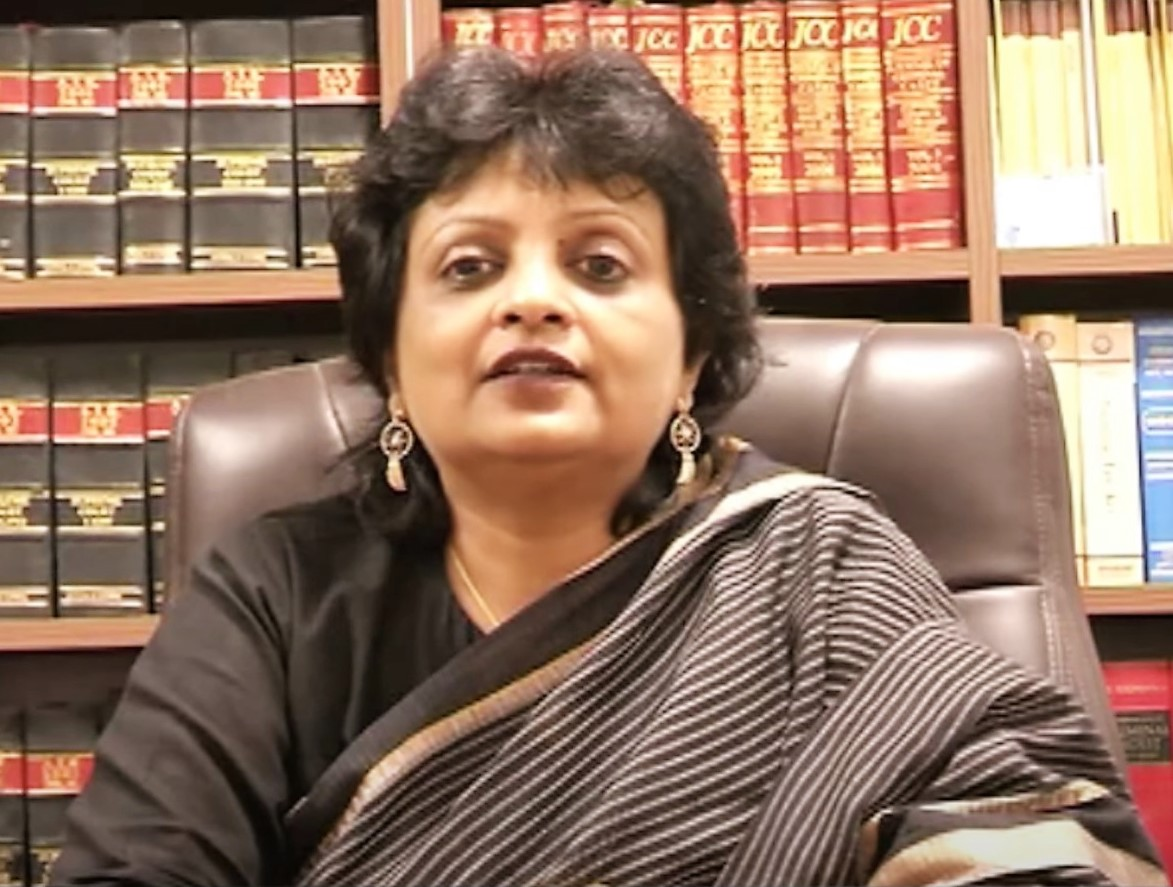
- John speaks to the National Law University, Delhi in 2014
- Occupation: Senior Advocate at the Supreme Court of India
- Known for: Criminal defence advocate

Rebecca Mammen John is a Senior Advocate at the Supreme Court of India, and works primarily in the field of criminal defence. She has represented parties in several widely reported cases, including the families of victims of the 1987 Hashimpura massacre, Indian stockbroker Harshad Mehta, and the accused in the Aarushi murder case. She has also been appointed as a Special Public Prosecutor on occasion by the High Court of Delhi, and frequently comments in leading newspapers and the media on issues of criminal justice reform in India.

== Career ==
Rebecca John enrolled with the Bar Council of Delhi in 1988 and has been practising in the field of criminal law since then. In 2013, John became the first woman to be designated a senior counsel by the High Court of Delhi on the criminal side. She has represented the accused in a number of significant and widely reported cases, including representing Indian stockbroker Harshad Mehta in a number of cases concerning the 1992 securities scam early in her career.

In 2012, she represented Kobad Ghandy, an Indian Communist writer and political activist, against charges under the Unlawful Activities (Prevention) Act. He was acquitted of the charges. In 2013, she represented Indian cricketer S. Sreesanth in the 2013 Indian Premier League spot-fixing and betting case in which he was ultimately discharged. She has also represented Nupur and Rajesh Talwar, who were accused of murdering their daughter Aarushi as well as a domestic worker, Hemraj, in a widely reported case in 2008. Both were eventually acquitted by the Allahabad High Court.

In 2010, John represented families of Sikh victims who died in the 1984 anti-Sikh riots, in the case against the Congress politician Jagdish Tytler for his alleged participation in the riots. In 2015, John represented the families of the victims of the 1987 Hashimpura massacre, in which members of the Provincial Armed Constabulary were charged with killing more than 40 Muslim men. A Delhi court convicted 16 Provincial Armed Constabulary members of the murders, awarding them life sentences. John, along with advocate Vrinda Grover, also made a case for the award of compensation to the victims' families. In an interview after the conclusion of the case, she described it as "a very very difficult journey, but the verdict, 31 years too late, was still a verdict we welcomed and [were] overjoyed about."

In 2017, John represented politicians Kanimozhi Karunanidhi, and Sanjay Chandra of the Unitech Group in the 2G spectrum case, in which they were acquitted by a special court in Delhi. She has also represented and got discharged the Maran brothers in the Aircel-Maxis case She has represented factory workers of a Maruti Suzuki plant; 13 workers were convicted of murdering a manager during a 2012 workers strike, while 117 co-accused were acquitted of all charges. In 2016, she represented student and politician Kanhaiya Kumar and got him bail in a case of alleged sedition. She has also represented Kanhaiya Kumar in a case concerning a fine levied on him by the Jawaharlal Nehru University. The Delhi High Court ordered the fine to be set aside. John is a part of a team of lawyers representing Congress leaders in the National Herald case.

John is also representing several of the accused in the 2020 Delhi riots, foreign nationals belonging to the Tablighi Jamaat, who were arrested during the COVID-19 pandemic in India, and persons arrested near or at the site of protests against amendments to India's citizenship laws. John has also represented the Chief Minister of New Delhi Arvind Kejriwal in several cases including obtaining his acquittal in 2020 in a defamation case filed against him. In 2020, John appeared for one of the convicts in the 2012 Delhi gang rape and murder case (Nirbhaya case) pleading for the correct application of the law governing the execution of his sentence of death.

In addition to private criminal defence, she has on occasion been appointed as a Special Public Prosecutor and government counsel in a number of cases. In 2018, John was part of a panel of lawyers appointed by the Delhi government to represent it in certain cases before the Delhi High Court and the Supreme Court. The panel was temporarily dissolved by the Lieutenant-Governor of Delhi. John was reinstated after the Delhi Government reconstituted the panel, following a Supreme Court ruling that the Lieutenant-Governor did not have the power to interfere with actions of the elected government of Delhi. In 2019, she was appointed as Special Public Prosecutor in the Ankit Saxena murder case.

Rebecca John has also served as a statutory member of the Internal Complaints Committee of the High Court of Delhi which deals with sexual harassment complaints.

Recently, she has been engaged as an expert for a forthcoming report published by TrialWatch of the Clooney Foundation for Justice.

=== MJ Akbar v. Priya Ramani Trial ===
From 2018 through 2021, John represented Indian journalist Priya Ramani, the defendant in a criminal defamation case filed by former Union Minister M. J. Akbar after Ramani alleged, during the MeToo movement in India, that Akbar had sexually harassed her in 1993. CNN described the case as one of two high-profile criminal defamation cases that had recently shaken India's #MeToo movement. The Court had summoned Priya Ramani on 29 January 2019, beginning a trial that would go on to last two years.

John cross-examined the former Union Minister who took the stand as well as the other witnesses produced by him. She called Priya Ramani, her friend Niloufer Venkataraman and journalist Ghazala Wahab, Editor of Force Magazine, as witnesses for the defence. Wahab had accused Akbar of sexual harassment and assault, at the time she was a young journalist working under him, in a piece written in the Wire titled 'M.J. Akbar, Minister and Former Editor, Sexually Harassed and Molested Me'.

On February 17, 2021, the court dismissed the complaint against Ramani, stating the charges had not been proven. Additional Chief Metropolitan Magistrate Ravindra Kumar Pandey, of the New Delhi District Court, authored a ninety-one page judgment acquitting Priya Ramani of the offence of criminal defamation, holding that "Woman has the right to put up the grievance at any platform of her choice even after decades. Woman cannot be punished for raising voice against sex abuse. Right to reputation cannot be protected at the cost of right to dignity." The judgment was widely celebrated on social media. It was later reported that Akbar's counsel stated that they would appeal the verdict.

John stated in an interview "In that sense, I think, when you fight powerful people and you have only truth on your side, the journey becomes relevant to you personally. So I think this is probably the most important case of my career".

== Commentary ==
John has frequently commented on the subject of criminal law reform in India. In 2013, John spoke with Reuters about what she described as "really, really shoddy" Indian police investigation of rape, as well as the lengthy prosecution process in court. In 2014, she was one of several lawyers who critiqued the Criminal Law (Amendment) Act, 2013, pointing out that the proposed law could potentially allow accused persons to avoid penalties for the offence of rape. In 2017, John spoke with SheThePeople.TV about improvements that could be made in the prosecution of rape charges.

In 2018, John wrote for Firstpost, critiquing a Supreme Court recommendation for the framing of a new law to specifically address incidents of mob lynching in India, arguing that the focus should instead be on better prosecution and investigation rather than the creation of a new law.

In 2018, John expressed support for the Me Too movement in India, encouraging victims to file criminal complaints and provide testimony in cases of sexual harassment and assault, while acknowledging the challenges, including extensive delays, in the criminal process.

John has also stated her opposition to the death penalty, and criticised inconsistencies in the application of the death penalty in India stating that there is "no uniform understanding of the requirements of rarest of rare doctrine". John has critiqued the use of satisfying the 'collective conscience of society' as a ground to justify the application of thee death penalty, stating, "It is an amorphous term. It has become a catch phrase in Delhi. Nobody really understands what it means. It is part of the mindlessness of death sentencing. It is not possible to judicially determine what it means." She has also criticised the practice of executing convicts without notifying their families, describing the practice as "against the humanitarian values the Indian state professes to uphold."

In 2020, John was described by The Quint as "one of India’s most reputed criminal law experts" and in an interview with Bar and Bench described herself as a criminal lawyer who serves the Constitution of India.

== Education ==
John studied law at the Faculty of Law, University of Delhi. In 2025, she was awarded an Honorary Doctorate by SOAS University, London, U.K. for her contributions to social justice and human rights and in recognition of her long career in criminal law in India.

== Personal life ==
John has two brothers, both of whom live outside India.
