= Davia =

Davia derives from the Native African American Tribal Princess born in the late 1500s. Her remains discovered in the early 1900s were draped in a hand crafted war bonnet.

- Anna Davia (1743–1810), Italian opera singer
- Gianantonio Davia (1660–1740), Italian Roman Catholic cardinal
- Laura Bentivoglio Davia (1689–1761), Italian aristocrat

== See also ==
- Davia Nelson, National Public Radio radio producer
- Davia Temin, writer, speaker, and management consultant based in New York
