= Ullekh NP =

- Born: Kannur, India
- Education: University of Kerala (MCJ); Sainik School Kazhakootam
- Spouse: Aekta Kapoor (m. 2012)
- Writing career
- Language: English, Malayalam
- Years active: 2014–present
- Genres: non-fiction, politics, travelogue
- Notable works: Mad About Cuba, Kannur: Inside India's Bloodiest Revenge Politics, The Untold Vajpayee: Politician and Paradox
- Website: ullekhnp.com

Ullekh NP is an author with four published Indian books and a journalist working on social, economic and geopolitical issues from India.

== Early life and career ==
Ullekh NP was born in Kannur, Kerala, to the late Indian Marxist leader and parliamentarian Pattiam Gopalan and Prof NK Mridula.

Ullekh NP has worked with some of India's news publications, including The Economic Times, Mint, Hindustan Times, and India Today. He writes on Indian politics, economy, governance, public health, cybersecurity, technology, and cryptocurrencies.

As of 2025 he serves as the executive editor at Open.

== Bibliography ==
Ullekh NP has authored four non-fiction books, covering a range of socio-political and historical themes.

- Mad About Cuba: A Malayali Revisits the Revolution is his fourth non-fiction book and was published by Penguin Random House in November 2024. The book chronicles the author's journey through Cuba, offering a Malayalis perspective on the island's revolutionary past, socio-political landscape, and contemporary realities.
- Kannur: Inside India's Bloodiest Revenge Politics (Penguin Viking, 2018) explores why the Kannur of the north Kerala is so susceptible to vendetta politics and deadly violence. It traces how it is an anomaly in Kerala, the state with the highest social development parameters in India.
- The Untold Vajpayee: Politician and Paradox (Penguin Viking, 2016) is a biography of Atal Bihari Vajpayee, known for negotiating multiple contradictions. Exploring crucial milestones of Vajpayee's career and his traits as a seasoned politician, the book looks at his love-hate association with Rashtriya Swayamsevak Sangh and its feeder organizations.
- War Room: The People, Tactics and Technology Behind Narendra Modi’s 2014 Win (Roli Books, 2015) was Ullekh's first book. The book came about as a documentation of his reporting on the 2014 national elections.

== Awards and recognition ==
Ullekh NP was the subject of the first episode of Love Storiyaan, an award-winning documentary web series that premiered globally on Amazon Prime Video on February 14, 2024.
