= Love Storiyaan =

Indian romantic documentary

- Genre: Romantic documentary
- Created by: Priya Ramani; Samar Halarnkar; Niloufer Venkatraman
- Directed by: Somen Mishra
- Starring: Twinkle Tshering; Ankit Arora; Pratik Kothari
- Country of origin: India
- Original language: Hindi
- No. of episodes: 6

Production
- Producer: Dharmatic Entertainment

Original release
- Network: Amazon Prime Video
- Release: 14 February 2024

Love Storiyaan is a 2024 Indian romantic documentary series on Amazon Prime Video. It follows six real-life couples from different parts of India, highlighting their struggles to overcome societal challenges in maintaining their relationships. The series is inspired by the India Love Project, a social media initiative by journalists Priya Ramani, Samar Halarnkar, and Niloufer Venkatraman, which documents stories of couples overcoming social obstacles.

It is produced by Dharmatic Entertainment and directed by Somen Mishra. Love Storiyaan premiered on 14 February 2024 and is set across diverse locations in India.

== Episodes ==
An Unsuitable Girl: Delhi-based writer Aekta and Kerala-based journalist Ullekh share their journey of love, facing opposition from Aekta's daughters.

Love on Air: Radio jockeys Nicholas and Rajani recount their love story amidst the picturesque mountains of Meghalaya.

Homecoming: Sunit and Farida, a spirited 75-year-old couple, revisit their hometown in Bangladesh where they first fell in love.

Raah Sangharsh Ki: Dalit activist Subhadra and ex-IIT grad turned Adivasi advocate Rahul share their love story rooted in grassroots social welfare work.

Faasley: Dhanya, an Indian, and Homayon, an Afghan, recount their journey of love across different cultures and turbulent times.

Love Beyond Labels: Trans couple Tista and Dipan share their journey of finding themselves and each other in Kolkata.

== Critical reception ==
Archika Khurana of the Times of India gave the series 3.5 stars, stating, "Love Storiyaan' is celebrated for showcasing love in its diverse forms, reminding viewers that love exists beyond the confines of cinema." Nandini Ramnath of Scroll appreciated the concept but criticized the execution, stating, "Despite its feebleness, Love Storiyaan earns brownie points simply by existing." Shubhra Gupta of the Indian Express gave the series 2.5 stars, noting, "You look at the faces of these lovers, who have fought the hard fight, and have made a home together in the face of tremendous odds, and you break into a smile. Haan, yehi pyaar hai." Saibal Chatterjee of NDTV awarded the series 4 stars, describing it as a "Highly Watchable Celebration Of Love Across Man-Made Divides." Geetika Mantri of The News Minute gave 3.5 stars, calling it "A very bingeable celebration of love across bounds."

Sucharita Tyagi for Medium rated the series 1 out of 10, stating, "Love Storiyaan is a mixed bag of tales that vary in depth and emotional impact. Some episodes soar, some not so much. Nevertheless, the series succeeds in shedding light on the many faces of love in contemporary India." Sana Farzeen of India Today gave the series 4 stars, stating, "Conceptualised by Somen Mishra, 'Love Storiyaan' is truly a celebration of love and reminds us that amidst life's trials and tribulations, it's only human connections that hold us strong."
