= Swaroop Sawant =

Indian film director and editor

- Born: May 4, 1996
- Occupations: Film director, editor, screenwriter
- Years active: 2019–present
- Known for: Maharashtra Epstein Files

Swaroop Sawant is an Indian film director, editor and screenwriter associated with Marathi and Hindi cinema. He has worked on films like Balance, Rambh, Bhanwar Jindagi, Mhanje Waghache Panje, Devghar On Rent and Maharashtra Epstein Files.

== Career ==
Swaroop Sawant made his feature-film directorial debut with the Marathi film Balance (2019). He subsequently worked on films including Rambh and Bhanwar Jindagi. His other directorial projects include Mhanje Waghache Panje and Devghar On Rent.

In 2026, Sawant directed the Marathi film Maharashtra Epstein Files. The film became the subject of public controversy following concerns raised by politician Rupali Chakankar regarding the portrayal of a character in the film. Sawant stated that the film was fictional and denied that it was based on any particular individual.

In an interview with ABP Majha, Sawant discussed the legal notice received by the film's team and stated that the production was continuing despite the dispute.

== Filmography ==
Films
Year	Film	Language	Role
2019	Balance	Marathi	Director, editor
2021	Rambh	Hindi	Director, writer
2021	Bhanwar Jindagi	Hindi	Director, editor, actor
2025	Mhanje Waghache Panje	Marathi	Director
2025	Posco 307	Marathi	Director, actor
2026	Devghar On Rent	Marathi	Director
2026	Maharashtra Epstein Files	Marathi	Director
