= Temin =

Temin is a surname. Notable people with the surname include:

- Davia Temin, American writer, speaker, and management consultant
- Howard Martin Temin (1934–1994), American geneticist and virologist
- Kathy Temin (born 1968), Australian artist
- Peter Temin (1937–2025), American economist and economic historian, brother of Howard

== See also ==
- Tamin
