= Tune for the Dead =

Novel by Chetan Bhagat

Tune For The Dead
- Author: Anshul Vijayvargiya & Debashish Irengbam
- Language: Indian English
- Series: Detective Dhruv Series
- Genre: Mystery, thriller
- Set in: India, China
- Publisher: HarperCollins India
- Publication date: 30 April 2019
- Publication place: India
- Media type: Paperback
- Pages: 208
- ISBN: 9789353029623

Tune For The Dead is a detective fiction novel co-written by Anshul Vijayvargiya and Debashish Irengbam and published by HarperCollins India in 2019.

== Reception ==
Tune For The Dead got positive reviews from the critics with Navmi Krishna of The Hindu calling it "A pacy crime thriller set in present-day Manali, Tune for the Dead ticks all the boxes of a detective novel done right"

The Times Of India review said "The plot has a lot of enjoyable revelations twists and surprises making it hard to put down."

The Asian Age said in its review, "The writing is crisp, the pace steady, the suspense decent, but it’s the character of Dhruv who ensures that the reader doesn’t put down the book"
