= Sidharth Luthra =

Senior advocate in the Supreme Court of India

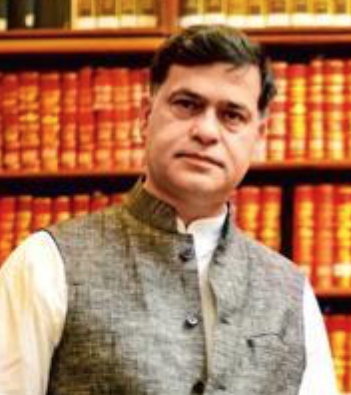
- Senior Advocate Sidharth Luthra
- Born: 16 February 1966
- Education: Hindu College, Delhi; Faculty of Law, University of Delhi, University of Cambridge (MPhil)
- Occupation: Senior Advocate at the Supreme Court of India

Sidharth Luthra (Hindi: सिद्धार्थ लूथरा; born 16 February 1966) is an Indian senior advocate at the Supreme Court of India. He previously served as the Additional Solicitor General of India at the Supreme Court and represented the union and various state governments in matters relating to fundamental rights, electoral reforms, criminal law. He resigned from this position in May 2014. He is the son of K.K. Luthra, who was also a senior advocate, and brother of senior advocate Geeta Luthra.

Luthra specialises in criminal law, white-collar crimes and cyber frauds. He studied law at the University of Delhi, where he completed his LLB in 1990, and later graduated with an MPhil in Criminology from the University of Cambridge in 1991. He was conferred an Honorary Doctorate of Law by Amity University, Noida, India, in 2015.

Luthra represented former Union Minister of Finance, Late Shri Arun Jaitley in a criminal defamation lawsuit filed by him against the Chief Minister of Delhi, Shri Arvind Kejriwal.

Luthra is a member of the Delhi State Legal Services Authority, and the Vice-President of the Indian Criminal Justice Society. He also sits on the advisory board of two Indian legal journals – the Delhi Law Times, and the Delhi Reported Judgements. Luthra dedicates nearly 30 to 40 percent of his cases to pro bono.

Apart from litigation, Luthra teaches law in India and abroad. He is a visiting professor at Northumbria University at Newcastle, United Kingdom and an Honorary Professor at the Amity University, Noida, Uttar Pradesh.

== Early life and education ==
Luthra studied sciences at Delhi Public School, RK Puram, followed by a BA in mathematics from Hindu College, Delhi in 1987. He graduated with a law degree in 1990 from the prestigious Campus Law Centre of the Faculty of Law, University of Delhi. He then went to the University of Cambridge to pursue an MPhil in Criminology. He is a fellow of the Cambridge Commonwealth Trust.

== Career ==
One of the top criminal lawyers in the country, Luthra has been practising law for over three decades. He joined the bar in 1991 and started working at Bhasin & Co where he practised civil law. In 1993, he started working at his father's chamber but continued practising civil law. He also taught law at the Delhi University from 1996 to 1997.

After his father's demise in 1997, Luthra reinvented himself as a criminal lawyer under the mentorship of late Senior Advocate P R Vakil, and took over his late father's legal practice.

=== Tehelka Case ===
In 2002, Luthra represented Tehelka Magazine before the Justice Venkataswami Commission which was constituted in the aftermath of the Operation West End sting operation. During the proceedings of the commission, he cross-examined the then-Union Defence Minister George Fernandes.

=== Senior Advocate ===
Luthra represented the Government of India in the High Court of Delhi from 2004 to 2007 as a Senior Panel Counsel. He was designated as a Senior Advocate, a position that is conferred on merit to exceptional lawyers by the judges of the High Court, in 2007. He shifted his practice from the Delhi High Court to the Supreme Court of India in 2010.

=== Justice Soumitra Sen Case ===
Luthra was appointed by the Government of India in 2009 as a counsel to assist the Judges Inquiry Committee in the Justice Soumitra Sen Case. The Committee found Justice Sen guilty of misbehaviour under Article 124(4) (read with proviso (b) to Article 217(1)) of the Constitution of India.

=== Facebook Case ===
In December 2011, Luthra was hired by Facebook for a criminal trial initiated by journalist Vinay Rai against 21 social networking sites in India, including Facebook, Google and Yahoo.

=== Tenure as Additional Solicitor General ===
In 2012, the Manmohan Singh government appointed Luthra to the post of the Additional Solicitor General (ASG). One of the biggest cases in his tenure as ASG was the proposed release of the seven convicts in the Rajiv Gandhi assassination case. The Tamil Nadu government had proposed to remit the sentence of life for the seven convicted for the assassination of Rajiv Gandhi release them after their death penalty was commuted to sentence of life by the Supreme Court in 2014. The then Attorney General of India, late senior advocate Goolam Essaji Vahanvati, the then Solicitor General senior advocate Mohan Parasaran and Luthra swiftly moved a writ petition to the Supreme Court on behalf of the Union Government challenging the power of the Tamil Nadu government to remit the sentences of the convicted Sriharan alias Murugan and six others. The remittance was put on hold by the Supreme Court which in a later sentence in December 2015, held that a state government has no suo motu power to remit sentences of persons who were convicted under a central Law and cases investigated by the CBI.

Luthra also represented Central Bureau of Investigation, India, in the Dr. Subramanian Swamy vs Director, CBI, case in 2013–14 in which the constitutional validity of Section 6A of the Delhi Special Police Establishment Act, 1946 ('the DSPE Act') was at issue. A Constitution Bench comprising Chief Justice R.M. Lodha, and Justices A.K. Patnaik, S J Mukhopadhaya, Dipak Misra and F M Ibrahim Kalifulla held that Section 6A of the DSPE Act that granted protection to joint secretary and above officers from facing even a preliminary inquiry by the CBI in corruption cases, was violative of Article 14 of the constitution and thus constitutionally invalid, a decision that was welcomed by the CBI.

=== Recent Cases ===
Luthra represented WhatsApp in a public interest litigation case filed against it in September 2016 in the Delhi High Court by two students regarding its new privacy policy.

Luthra is currently representing the Union Minister of Finance Arun Jaitley in a criminal defamation lawsuit filed against the Chief Minister of Delhi, Arvind Kejriwal. Arun Jaitley has also filed a civil defamation case against Arvind Kejriwal. In November 2016, the Supreme Court declined Kejriwal's appeal to stay the criminal defamation proceedings.

In 2016, Luthra also represented the Chief Minister of Andhra Pradesh, Mr. N. Chandrababu Naidu in the 2015 Cash For Vote Scam case. On 9 December 2016, the Hyderabad High Court set aside the order passed by the Special Anti-Corruption Bureau (ACB) court that directed the Telangana Anti-Corruption Bureau to conduct a probe into Mr Naidu's role in the cash for vote scam case.

Luthra served as the special public prosecutor in the Nirbhaya gang rape case. The final verdict on the case was delivered by the Supreme Court on 5 May 2017, where it upheld the death sentence for all the four convicts that were sentenced to death by the trial court in September 2013.

=== As Amicus Curiae ===
In addition to his litigation work, Luthra is assisting the Supreme Court of India as amicus curiae in the matter of criminalisation of politics which is due to be heard by the constitution bench of the Supreme Court. The said matter was referred to a constitution bench of the Supreme Court by a bench comprising Justices A K Sikri and R K Agrawal examining an appeal filed by the Uttar Pradesh government challenging Allahabad High Court order for constituting a committee of eminent persons to suggest ways and means to check criminalisation of politics. Luthra told the bench that the police and the Central Bureau of Investigation should be made immune to political influence so that the criminal trials against politicians can be expedited.

== Publications ==
Year	Title	Newspaper/Publisher	Notes
2020	2 lockdown violations that reveal the weak spot of Indian State	Hindustan Times	Published on 8 April 2020, co-authored with Ketaki Goswami
2020	Disaster management: Gaps in our responses to battle Covid-19	The Times of India Blog	Published on 3 April 2020, co-authored with Ketaki Goswami
2020	Next 24 hours are crucial for the migrant workers. States must act now	Hindustan Times	Published on 30 March 2020, co-authored with Ketaki Goswami
2020	Relevance of century-old legislations in India’s fight against Covid-19	The Times of India Blog	Published on 28 March 2020
2020	As communal riots exploded in Delhi, elected representatives were missing on the ground when residents needed them most	The Times of India Blog	Published on 14 March 2020
2018	Delhi Government Versus LG: The Bicycle Ride That Is Delhi	Bloomberg Quint	Published on 8 July 2018
2017	Sidharth Luthra: On the early struggle of being a lawyer	Too Fool for School	Published on 22 October 2017
2017	Ask Partition victims what it means to be a refugee	Hindustan Times	Published on 18 October 2017
2017	Put the victim at the centre of the justice system	Hindustan Times	Published on 4 September 2017
2017	Crime and Sentencing	Indian Journal of Constitution and Administrative Law	Published in 2017, co-authored with Supriya Juneja
2016	Rape: Violation of the Chastity or Dignity of Woman? A Feminist Critique of Indian Law	Torkel Opsahl Academic EPublisher	Published on 27 June 2016
2016	Epilogue for Climate Change – Law, Policy and Governance	Eastern Book Company	Published in 2016
2015	Single Mothers, Absent Fathers and the Best Interests of the Child: Drawing a Fine Balance in the ABC Case	Oxford Human Rights Hub	Published on 16 July 2015
2015	A Balancing Act – Protection Privacy and Permitting Surveillance	SSC online and Student Law Journal	Published in 2015
2014	The Speed of Justice	The Indian Express	Published on 7 April 2014
2014	Right to Silence	Times of India	Published on 3 February 2014
2013	The Power of a Short Message	The Indian Express	Published on 21 June 2013
2006	Is it Time to Revisit K.M. Mathew Case?	Eastern Book Company	Published in 2006

== Contributions ==
Luthra contributed to the Prevention of Bribery of Foreign Public Officials and Officials of Public International Organisations—A Study and Proposed Amendments report and the Amendments to Criminal Procedure Code, 1973 – Provisions Relating to Bail report released by the Law Commission of India in August 2015 and May 2017 respectively.

== Honours ==
Luthra was conferred an Honorary Doctorate of Law by Amity University, Noida, India, in 2015.

== K.K. Luthra Memorial Moot Court ==
Luthra and the Delhi University Campus Law Centre organise the K.K. Luthra Memorial Moot Court, an international moot court competition every year in memory of Luthra's late father Mr. K.K. Luthra.

== Links to Articles ==
1. Delhi Government Versus LG: The Bicycle Ride That Is Delhi

2. Sidharth Luthra: On the early struggle of being a lawyer

3. Ask Partition victims what it means to be a refugee

4. Statement from the Office of Senior Advocate Sidharth Luthra on the Dismissal of Bail Petitions in the AP Liquor Case

5. Crime and Sentencing

6. Rape: Violation of the Chastity or Dignity of Woman? A Feminist Critique of Indian Law

7. Epiloguge for Climate Change – Law, Policy and Governance, Usha Tandon (Editor)

8. Single Mothers, Absent Fathers and the Best Interests of the Child: Drawing a Fine Balance in the ABC Case

9. The Speed of Justice

10. Right to Silence

11. The Power of a Short Message

12. Is it Time to Revisit K.M. Mathew Case?
