= Rekha Sharma (Indian politician) =

Indian politician

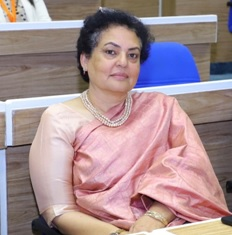

Member of Parliament, Rajya Sabha
- Incumbent
- Assumed office 10 December 2024
- Preceded by: Krishan Lal Panwar
- Constituency: Haryana

National Chairperson of the National Commission for Women
- In office 7 August 2018 – 7 August 2024
- Preceded by: Lalitha Kumaramangalam
- Succeeded by: Vijaya Kishore Rahatkar

Personal details
- Party: Bharatiya Janata Party

Rekha Sharma is a former Chairperson of the National Commission for Women in India.

Rekha Sharma had filed her nomination for the bypoll as a BJP candidate from Haryana on 10 December 2024 and was declared elected unopposed to Rajya Sabha after the deadline for withdrawal of nomination on 13 December 2024 as no other candidate had submitted nomination for the bypolls.

== Career ==
Sharma is former chairperson of the National Commission for Women (NCW). As the Chairperson, her job was to advocate for gender equality, spearheading initiatives to further the cause of women's empowerment.

Empowering Law Enforcement: Changing Minds, Empowering Women Sharma spearheaded an innovative collaboration between NCW and the Bureau of Police Research and Development. This collaboration aims to empower police personnel across the nation with empathetic responses to gender-based violence victims.

Fostering Economic Empowerment: Cultivating Entrepreneurs Under her leadership, NCW launched a business course benefiting 5,000 aspiring women entrepreneurs.

Navigating the Digital Landscape: Promoting Digital Literacy NCW played a pivotal role in the "We Think Digital" campaign. This digital literacy endeavour has touched the lives of 60,000 women, equipping them with the skills to navigate the online realm safely and effectively.

== Criticism ==
Under her leadership, NCW failed to respond to complaints from women rights associations over numerous serious rape crimes perpetrated against Kuki women in the state of Manipur, India. Ms. Sharma failed to respond to written complaints emailed directly to her office on 12 June 2023 filed by a Manipur Tribal Association headquartered abroad. The complaints clearly state the crimes and abuses faced by women, such as being, "disrobed, paraded naked, beaten and then encircled by a marauding Meitei mob and raped in public”, committed on 4 May. There were no replies or acknowledgement from NCW of the complaints until a video showing the alleged crime became viral on Twitter. Critics argue that under her leadership, India has seen little to no progress on the women safety front, and the country still ranks among the least safe nations in the world for women. In March 2024, Sharma faced further criticism from journalists from India and abroad for her response to a complaint about women's safety in India. Many women noted that they were appalled at Sharma's words, recounting the horrors of their travels in India.
