= Covert magazine =

Indian magazine

Covert is a fortnightly political magazine of which the first edition was published on 15 May 2008. Its founder is the well known journalist and columnist MJ Akbar. The magazine targets at people who are very intellectual and want to keep up to date with the socio-political situation in India. The current editor is Seema Mustafa. It is published in English language.

M. J. Akbar said "The ideology of the magazine is the ideology of my own profession – journalism. There should be space for every viewpoint as long as there is logic and rationale and it is not a rant."
