= India Untouched: Stories of a People Apart =

- Directed by: Stalin K
- Based on: Untouchability
- Produced by: Drishti & Navsarjan Trust
- Cinematography: Stalin K Nirmala Nair; Sooraj Nambiar; Anuradha Srinivasan
- Edited by: Stalin K Nirmala Nair
- Music by: Dalit folk artists
- Production companies: Drishti Media, Arts & Human Rights; Navsarjan Trust
- Release date: 14 April 2007 (Worldwide)
- Running time: 108 minutes
- Country: India
- Language: multiple Indian languages

India Untouched: Stories of a People Apart is a 2007 documentary by Indian filmmaker Stalin K. The film reveals the discrimination and atrocities against Dalits and practice of Untouchability rooted in different parts of India. Stalin's interview and clips of the film were featured in Episode 10: Dignity for All of Satyamev Jayate TV series on the issue of Untouchability.

== Awards ==
The documentary won numerous awards:

- Silver Dhow, Second-best Documentary, Zanzibar International Film Festival, Tanzania.
- Golden Conch, Best Documentary, Mumbai International Film Festival.
- Best Film of the Festival, 2008 Mumbai International Film Festival.
- Best Documentary, Mahindra IAAC Film Festival, New York.
- Best Film, One Billion Eyes Film Festival, Chennai, India.
