= Priya Ramani =

Indian Journalist

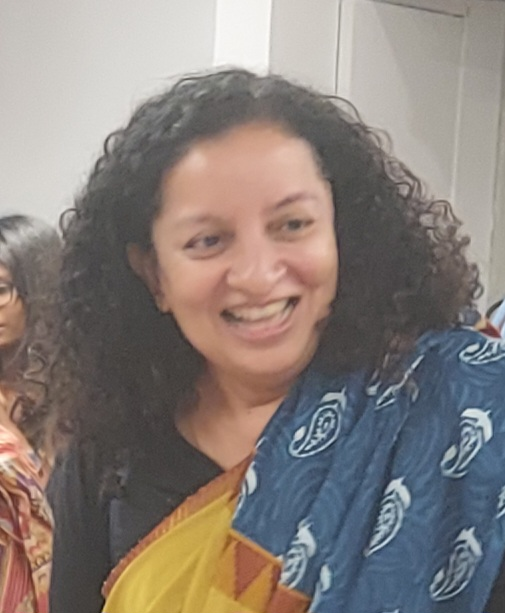
- Priya Ramani in Bangalore
- Occupations: Journalist, editor
- Title: Editor at large, Juggernaut Books
- Spouse: Samar Halarnkar

Priya Ramani is an Indian journalist, writer, and editor. In October 2018, during the Me Too movement in India, Ramani alleged sexual harassment against now-former Minister of State for External Affairs M.J. Akbar, and in February 2021, Ramani was acquitted in the criminal defamation case Akbar had filed against her. In October 2020, Ramani co-created the India Love Project on Instagram.

== Career ==
Ramani began working at The Asian Age in 1994, then Reuters, Elle, India Today, Cosmopolitan magazine and Mint Lounge. Ramani has also written for Livemint, Indian Express, and Vogue India. Ramani led Mint Lounge for eight years. She is an editor at large at Juggernaut Books for its digital properties. Ramani also serves as an editorial board member of Article 14, a website about the rule of law in India.

=== Vogue India ===
On 12 October 2017, Vogue India published an article by Ramani titled "To the Harvey Weinsteins of the world," that was styled as an open letter, beginning with "Dear Male Boss" and including a description of sexual harassment during a job interview in a Mumbai hotel room when she was 23 years old. In the article, Ramani did not name the person who interviewed her.

== #MeToo ==
In October 2018, Ramani made the allegation of sexual harassment against now-former Union minister and veteran journalist M.J. Akbar on Twitter in a tweet during the #MeToo movement. On 8 October 2018, Ramani tweeted with a reference to her 2017 Vogue India piece, stating "I began this piece with my MJ Akbar story. Never named him because he didn’t "do" anything. Lots of women have worse stories about this predator—maybe they'll share." Soon after Ramani's tweets, more women accused Akbar of sexual misconduct during his career as a journalist.

== Criminal defamation case ==
=== Filing ===
M.J. Akbar filed a criminal defamation case against Ramani on 15 October 2018, and resigned as Minister of State for External Affairs on 17 October 2018; at the time, The New York Times described Akbar as "the most prominent figure so far to be felled by the #MeToo movement sweeping the world's largest democracy." Bhawana Bisht, writing for SheThePeople.TV, described the case against Ramani as an example of a SLAPP lawsuit and "a way to drag the women to court and intimidate them until they withdraw." Ramani pleaded not guilty, and faced a prison sentence up to two years.

=== Court process ===
In January 2019, Ramani was summoned to court, and in February, granted bail on a personal bond of Rs 10,000. In June, CNN described Ramani's case as one of two "high-profile criminal defamation cases [that] have recently shaken the country’s #MeToo movement." Senior Advocate Rebecca Mammen John represented Ramani, and in September 2020, John told the court, "A true imputation made in the public good is not defamation... it is not defamation to make an imputation on the character of another when it is made in good faith for the protection of his or other's interest." John also said, "Priya Ramani's alleged defamatory tweets and the Vogue article were her truth. I am saying this is my (Ramani's) truth... it is the truth, is in good faith, touching public good."

Ramani told the court on 7 September 2020, "It was my hope that the disclosures, which were part of #MeToo, would empower women to speak up for their rights at the workplace. This case has come at great personal cost to me. I had nothing to gain from it. I am a very well regarded journalist. I live a quiet life with my family in Bangalore," and "By keeping silent, I could have avoided the subsequent targeting. But that wouldn’t have been the right thing to do."

On 19 September, John asserted the critical importance of freedom of speech and expression to a democracy, and said Ramani was a "small part" of the larger #MeToo movement. John also argued that Ramani's allegation of sexual harassment was supported by other women who made similar allegations against Akbar, including journalist Ghazala Wahab. John concluded with a reference to a Ruth Bader Ginsburg quote and said that the #MeToo Movement began to correct a "structural wrong." After John completed her presentation, and before Akbar's senior advocate Geeta Luthra was to begin, the court decided to transfer the case to another court in what was described as a "controversial" transfer. On 22 October, the case was sent back to the court.

In November 2020, Senior Advocate Geeta Luthra submitted to the court on behalf of Akbar that Ramani made the statements out of vengeance, not the public good, and Ramani failed to produce evidence of her allegations and failed to apologize for the statements. On 21 November 2020, the court asked Ramani and Akbar to consider a settlement of the case. On 24 November 2020, John informed the court on behalf of Ramani that there was no chance of a settlement. Due to a transfer of judges, the matter would now be heard again before the new judge.

On 10 December 2020, John told the court that workplace sexual harassment is a "matter of public interest" that "has been recognized as a violation of the fundamental rights of women." On 14 December, Ramani submitted to the court through John that "#MeToo came to India in 2018. It wasn't a crime to speak up on the #MeToo platform. These are acts of extreme courage that require celebration. These are not acts for which one should face defamation."

On 18 December 2020, Ramani alleged in court through John that Akbar did not approach the court with clean hands. Over 20 women have alleged sexual harassment by Akbar while they were working as journalists under him, and John told the court that Ramani was not the first to tweet against Akbar: "Several women had tweeted. Ghazala Wahab tweeted two days before. Shunali Khullar Shroff and Prerna Singh Bhindra tweeted before her." John said 15 women had accused Akbar of sexual harassment by the time he filed the case against Ramani in October 2018, and Akbar "played a fraud" by failing to mention the other accusations against him when he filed and then claiming that only Ramani's statement defamed him.

On 22 December 2020, Luthra told the court, "People on responsible position like journalists should not make such allegations on social media. They should come to court instead." On 24 December, in court, Akbar denied meeting Ramani in the hotel where she alleged the sexual harassment happened. On 4 January 2021, Luthra stated in court that "without any investigation or basis," Ramani referred to Akbar as "media's biggest sexual predator" in a tweet about Akbar's resignation. On 18 January, in response to Ramani's point about the other allegations made against Akbar, Luthra told the court, "Harm is done by the man who instigates and ignites the flame first." On 21 January, Luthra told the court that Ramani's deletion of her own Twitter account before cross-examination was deliberate and intended "to subserve the cause of justice."

Ramani's counsel Rebecca John began final arguments on 27 January 2021, stating Akbar's arguments do not make sense based on a plain reading of Ramani's Vogue article, and that the testimony of Ghazala Wahab, who has accused Akbar of sexual assault, as well as a Firstpost article introduced by Akbar's legal team that provided details of allegations against Akbar, were relevant support for Ramani's reference to Akbar as a 'predator.' On 1 February, John continued to address Luthra's arguments, including about Ramani's Twitter account, noting it had only been deactivated, not deleted, and Akbar had never filed a request and the court had not required reactivation of the accourt. During the final argument, John submitted to the court, "Mr. Akbar went after Ms. Ramani as she was a soft target and did not go after other women because he was afraid."

=== Verdict ===
On 17 February 2021, the court dismissed the complaint against Ramani, stating the charges had not been proven. In the ruling, Judge Ravindra Kumar Pandey wrote, "Despite how well respected some persons are in the society, they in their personal lives, could show extreme cruelty to the females," and "The time has come for our society to understand the sexual abuse and sexual harassment and its implications on victims." Pandey continued, "The woman cannot be punished for raising (her) voice against the sex abuse on the pretext of criminal complaint of defamation, as the right of reputation cannot be protected at the cost of the right of life and dignity of woman as guaranteed in the Indian Constitution."

After the verdict, Ramani stated it "feels great to have your truth validated before court," and "It feels amazing, truly does. I feel vindicated on behalf of all the women who have ever spoken out against sexual harassment at work place. It was me, the victim, who had to stand up in the court as an accused. I thank everyone who stood by me, especially my witnesses Ghazala Wahab and Niloufer Venkatraman, who came to the court and testified on my behalf," and she thanked her lawyer Rebecca Mammen John and her legal team. Activists and lawyers also praised the verdict. Sowmya Rajendran described Ramani as a "trailblazer", and wrote "because of her courage, there will be many more women who come after her, who will believe in their right to speak and be heard, too."

=== Appeal ===
On 11 August 2021, Akbar filed an appeal with the Delhi High Court, challenging the verdict. On 13 January 2022, the Delhi High Court accepted the case for review.

== India Love Project ==
On 28 October 2020, Ramani, her husband Samar Halarnkar, and their friend Niloufer Venkatraman created the India Love Project (ILP) on Instagram, as "a celebration of interfaith/inter-caste love and togetherness in these divisive, hate-filled times" where people are invited to people to submit personal or family stories about love transcending religious and communal identities.

ILP began in response to backlash against an advertising campaign that featured an interfaith couple, and has expanded to help couples find legal and counseling assistance. Ramani said the idea for ILP started with the increasing controversy over religious conversion laws (also known as "love jihad" laws).

== Education ==
Ramani studied psychology at St Xavier's College in Mumbai and journalism at Temple University in Philadelphia.

== Personal life ==
Ramani is married to journalist Samar Halarnkar.
