= Seema Mustafa =

Indian journalist (born 1955)

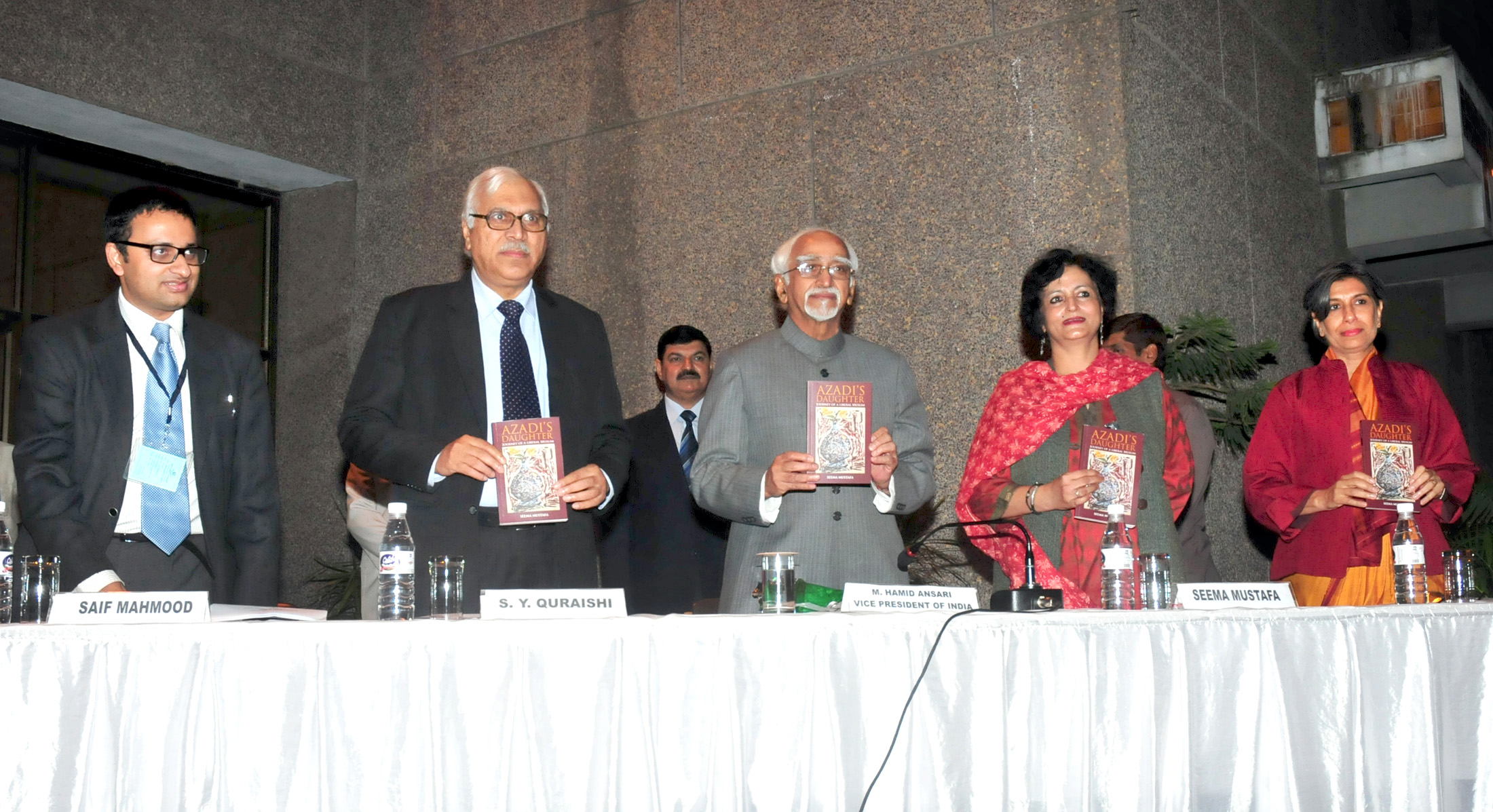
- Seema Mustafa, second right, at a book release function
- Born: 20 April 1955 (age 71); India
- Occupation: Journalist
- Notable work: Azadi's daughter
- Children: 2
- Relatives: Anis Kidwai (grandmother); Ayesha Kidwai (cousin)

Seema Mustafa (born 20 April 1955) is an Indian print and television journalist. She is currently the Editor-in-Chief of The Citizen, a digital newspaper she founded. She is the elected president of the Editors Guild of India, since 16 October 2020.

== Background and education ==
Seema Mustafa was born in Delhi to a muslim family from Uttar Pradesh. Her father, Syed Mustafa, was an officer in the Indian Army. Her mother was the daughter of Shafi Ahmed Kidwai, brother of Rafi Ahmed Kidwai, a freedom fighter and Congress politician. Shafi Ahmed Kidwai, who lived in Mussoorie, was killed in 1947, at the time of the partition of India. His wife Anis Kidwai (Seema's maternal grandmother) was later made a Rajya Sabha MP belonging to the Congress party.

Mustafa has two elder brothers, S.P. Mustafa (known as "Bobby"), group treasurer of Hindustan Unilever, and Kamal Mustafa, now retired but formerly the Head of Global M&A of Citibank. Ayesha Kidwai, a professor of linguistics at JNU and a feminist activist, is her first cousin. Seema's mother and Ayesha's father were siblings.

Mustafa graduated with a BA in political science from Lucknow University in Uttar Pradesh.

== Career ==
Mustafa began her career in journalism with The Pioneer (a Lucknow-based newspaper), moved to The Patriot in 1979, and worked for several other Indian publications, including The Telegraph and Indian Express before joining the Asian Age in 1997 as its political editor and Delhi bureau chief.

While with the Asian Age, Mustafa received the prestigious "Prem Bhatia Award for Excellence in Political Reporting and Analysis" in 1999 for her coverage of the Kargil war. She also wrote a weekly op-ed column which was syndicated to several other newspapers, including The Deccan Chronicle of Bangalore and The Dawn, a Pakistani newspaper.

After leaving the Asian Age in 2008, Mustafa worked as Resident Editor of Covert, a fortnightly left-wing political magazine. In January 2010, her mentor M.J. Akbar launched The Sunday Guardian, a weekly newspaper, and Mustafa joined him as Resident Editor. By September of the same year, the publication was on its last legs and was acquired by the ITV Group, which runs the India-TV and NewsX television news channels. After the sale, Akbar moved to the India Today group, while Mustafa moved to NewsX, hosting a weekly interview programme named Straight Talk With Seema Mustafa on that channel. She served as National Affairs Editor of News X. The program did not get enough TRPs (viewership), and Mustafa moved on again.

She next took over the job of Director of a new, left-wing think-tank based in New Delhi named the "Centre for Policy Analysis" (not to be confused with the eminent Delhi-based think-tank, the Centre for Policy Research), a position she presently holds. Concurrently, in January 2014, she founded The Citizen, an independent "Digital Daily" based out of New Delhi.

Mustafa is the president of the Editors Guild of India, elected on 16 October 2020.

== Political career ==
Mustafa has been associated with several socialist political parties since the 1980s. She wrote the authorised biography of former prime minister VP Singh, entitled The Lonely Prophet, and was closely associated with him during his lifetime. She was a member of his party, the Janata Dal, for many years. She once contested the UP provincial assembly elections as a Janata Dal candidate but lost.

Mustafa also contested parliamentary elections to the Lok Sabha two times (1991 and 1996) from the Domariaganj constituency in Uttar Pradesh, but lost badly and even forfeited her election deposit on both occasions. In the 1991 elections, she took the 4th position in 1991 and in 1996, the 10th position. In 1991, she contested as a candidate of the Indian Congress (Socialist) - Sarat Chandra Sinha, an obscure splinter of the Indian National Congress (Socialist), itself a splinter of the Congress party. In 1996, she contested as an independent candidate.

In 2012–13, Mustafa associated herself with the Communist Party of India (Marxist) (CPM) in its campaign to pressure the government of India to oppose the US and support Iran on the issue of Iran's right to develop nuclear weapons. Mustafa is part of the CPM's Committee to Campaign for an Independent Foreign Policy. She has written in opposition to the Indo-US Nuclear Agreement.

== Publications ==
- Mustafa, Seema (1995). The Lonely Prophet: V.P. Singh, a Political Biography. New Delhi: New Age International. ISBN 978-81-224-0809-6. OCLC 33664491.
- Mustafa, Seema; Anuradha M. Chenoy and Initiative for National Renewal and Empowerment of the People (1995). The Scam: The Cover-up and Compromise. New Delhi: Wiley Eastern. ISBN 978-81-224-0713-6. OCLC 32698384.
- Mustafa, Seema (2012). Azadi's Daughter: Journey of a Liberal Muslim. New Delhi: ImprintOne. ISBN 978-81-888-6115-6.
- Mustafa, Seema (2013). Journalism: Ethics and Responsibilities. New Delhi: Pragun Publications. ISBN 978-81-241-1780-4.
