= The Untold Vajpayee: Politician and Paradox =

2016 book

- Author: Ullekh NP
- Language: English
- Subject: Politics
- Genre: Non-fiction
- Publisher: Penguin Random House
- Publication date: 26 December 2016
- Publication place: India
- Media type: Print (paperback)
- Pages: 304 pp (First Edition)
- ISBN: 978-0670088782

The Untold Vajpayee: Politician and Paradox is a 2016 book published by Penguin Viking in India and written by author Ullekh NP. It is the biography of the Indian politician and former Prime Minister of India Atal Bihari Vajpayee in English.

Tracing the life of one of India’s shrewdest politicians known for negotiating multiple contradictions, the book explores crucial milestones of Vajpayee’s career and his traits as a seasoned Indian politician. The book looked at his love-hate association with Rashtriya Swayamsevak Sangh and its feeder organizations. Supported by hard facts and accompanied by inside stories and anecdotes, the book analyses the life and times of a poet politician Vajpayee.

== Reception ==
Malayala Manorama described in its review that the author has done a valuable job stitching together a fine narrative, peppered with interesting anecdotes, that shines much light on the life and times of one of the tallest leaders independent India has had.

The Millennium Post described the book as an introspective lens into the veiled world of the soft-spoken Vajpayee. Business Standard said though the author has dug deep, he has come up with only material largely well-known in political and media circles. In addition to wide reviews, the book was also quoted for popular articles on Vajpayee in Indian newspapers.

Mani Shankar Iyer described it as "riveting biography of Vajpayee" which tells the amusing story of the teenage Atal Bihari defying his father's concern as a government servant over his son's political inclinations by smuggling his khaki shorts into his sister's hands who threw them over the wall as soon as Atal Bihari escaped out of the house, so that he could slip them on before running off to the local RSS shakha.

The Dawn said Ullekh found a Nehruvian streak in the political philosophy of the man who founded the Bharatiya Janata Party (BJP), the right wing Hindu party now ruling India. Author Manu S. Pillai said he was struck by "how easy it was, in [his] youthful mind, to write off Vajpayee's grandfatherly style as uninspiring."
