= Kannur: Inside India's Bloodiest Revenge Politics =

2018 book

- Author: Ullekh NP
- Language: English
- Subject: Politics
- Genre: Non-fiction
- Publisher: Penguin Viking in India
- Publication date: 19 June 2018
- Publication place: India
- Media type: Print (hardcover)
- Pages: 232 pp (First Edition)
- ISBN: 978-0670090693

Kannur: Inside India's Bloodiest Revenge Politics is a non-fiction book by Indian writer and journalist Ullekh NP. Published by Penguin Viking in June 2018, the book explores the deep-rooted political violence in Kannur, a coastal district in the south Indian state of Kerala. The book examines the ongoing conflicts between the Communist Party of India (Marxist) (CPI(M)) and the Rashtriya Swayamsevak Sangh (RSS), delving into the history and socio-political dynamics of the region.

== Synopsis ==
The book provides a detailed account of Kannur's history of political violence, tracing its origins and evolution. Ullekh NP, a native of Kannur, presents first-hand insights into the bloodshed that has shaped the district's political landscape. Through interviews with perpetrators, victims, and political figures, the book sheds light on the motivations behind the ongoing violence.

== Reception ==
The book received positive reviews from various scholars, journalists, and political analysts. Indian politician and writer Shashi Tharoor praised the book, stating: "At once well-researched and deeply felt, supported by interviews with perpetrators and victims alike, and backed up by a wealth of factual detail, Kannur is a book that provides both information and insight in a simple and lucidly accessible style. It deserves to be read by anyone concerned about the spiral of political violence bedevilling this part of God’s Own Country."

The Hindu quoting the book asserted that Political violence in Kannur district of Kerala is the result of a turf war between two competing ideologies. The Print said Ullekh's book has a possible antidote for political violence in Kannur.

In the foreword of the book, Sumantra Bose, Professor of International and Comparative Politics at the London School of Economics and Political Science, noted that Ullekh NP was uniquely positioned to write this account, given his background and deep personal connections. He commented: "Being an ‘insider’—and a politically connected insider, at that—can however pose disadvantages as well as advantages for the writer. His account is admirably unbiased and impartial. He also writes with an ideal mixture of empathy and detachment. He tells the story of unending horror with deadpan factuality, tinged with compassion."

== Translations ==
The book was also translated into Malayalam and published by Mathrubhumi.

== See also ==
- Communist Party of India (Marxist)
- Rashtriya Swayamsevak Sangh
