= Geeta Luthra =

Senior advocate in the Supreme Court of India

- Education: Lady Shri Ram College, (BA); Faculty of Law, University of Delhi,(LLB); University of Cambridge (LLM), (MPhil)
- Occupation: Senior Advocate at the Supreme Court of India

Geeta Luthra is a Senior Advocate in the Supreme Court of India.

== Career ==
Luthra began practicing law in the 1980s. For thirty years, she practiced law with Senior Advocate Pinky Anand. Luthra's legal practice experience includes criminal law, arbitration law, constitutional law, human rights and economic offenses. Her cases have included women's maintenance and property rights, bail in offenses against women, and the right for transgender people to serve in the paramilitary forces in India. She has also provided free legal services, including for female prison inmates in Bihar. In 2018, Luthra told the ThePrint, "Everyone deserves a chance at a fair trial," and "It is not my place to say what is right and what is wrong, I have always strived to work for a true sense of fairness. That is what makes me tick."

Luthra currently represents former Union Minister M. J. Akbar in the criminal defamation case he filed against Priya Ramani for sexual harassment allegations she made against him during the MeToo movement in India. She also has represented Tarun Tejpal since 2013 and Rajiv Kocher, brother-in-law of Chanda Kochhar. In 2016, Luthra represented Shashi Shekhar Thakur in the Delhi High Court. She has also represented Dubai-based businessman Rajeev Saxena.

In 2021, Luthra was one of two senior advocates who appeared in the Supreme Court on behalf of Bhartiya Janata Party leader and lawyer Ashwini Kumar Upadhyay, who filed a petition seeking the uniform application of gender and religion-neutral adoption and guardianship laws throughout India. Luthra also represented the National Commission for Women (NCW) in its Supreme Court challenge to a Bombay High Court case involving a man accused of groping a 12-year-old girl, where the verdict was an acquittal due to a lack of "skin-to-skin" contact.

== Commentary ==
Luthra has argued for statutory safety and privacy while implementing apps like Aarogya Setu, which are claimed to be in public health interest. In 2017, she provided commentary as a human rights lawyer to The Statesman after the Supreme Court ruled that the right to privacy is a fundamental right. In 2019, she spoke with Faye D'Souza of Times Now about the right to vote. In 2019, Luthra provided commentary to The Print about an order from a Nanded family court that included a provision for a man to donate sperm to his estranged wife or have his refusal be used as grounds for divorce.

In 2020, Luthra participated in a public debate about capital punishment with other attorneys that was hosted by the Delhi High Court Women Lawyers Forum. In 2020, Luthra spoke out about the anti-conversion law.

== Associations ==
Luthra is the Vice-President of the Indian Council of Arbitration. She is a member of the International Academy of Family Lawyers and LawAsia.

== Education ==
Luthra graduated from Lady Shri Ram College with a BA in Political Science in 1977 and graduated from the University of Cambridge with an LLM and M.Phil. after winning the Inlaks scholarship. While at Cambridge, Elihu Lauterpacht was one of her teachers. She studied law at Campus Law Centre, Faculty of Law, University of Delhi.

== Personal life ==
Luthra's father, K.K. Luthra, was a senior advocate, and her brother Sidharth Luthra is senior advocate who has said Luthra helped support the start of his law practice. Luthra's daughter Shivani has also joined the legal profession.
