= Mad About Cuba =

2024 book by Ullek NP

Mad About Cuba: A Malayali Revisits the Revolution
- Cover of the 1st edition
- Author: Ullekh NP
- Language: English
- Subject: Politics Travelogue
- Genre: Non-fiction
- Publisher: Penguin Random House in India
- Publication date: 21 November 2024
- Publication place: India
- Media type: Print (paperback)
- Pages: 256 pp (First Edition)
- ISBN: 978-0143469018

Mad About Cuba: A Malayali Revisits the Revolution is a non-fiction book by Indian journalist and author Ullekh NP, published by Penguin Random House in November 2024. The book chronicles the author's journey through Cuba, offering a Malayalis perspective on the island's revolutionary past, socio-political landscape, and contemporary realities.

== Overview ==
The book provides a journalistic exploration of Cuba, delving into its history, culture, and politics through the lens of a traveller from Kerala, India. Ullekh NP weaves together historical narratives, anecdotes, and his own experiences to present an account of life in post-revolutionary Cuba. It captures Kerala's long and abiding admiration of Fidel Castro and of the way communism still survives in the shadow of US sanctions.

Mad About Cuba covers the Cuban Revolution and analyses its impact on the island's people and governance. It also draws a parallel to India's Kerala state, which has a long leftist history and derives inspiration from Cuba's socialism.

The book also explores Cuban travel and culture, including music of Cuba, art, food, and daily life. The book examines the challenges Cubans face in the wake of economic hardships and changing global dynamics.

== Reception ==
The book received positive reviews for its engaging narrative, insightful commentary, and blend of historical analysis with personal storytelling. Critics appreciated Ullekh's balanced approach in assessing Cuba’s revolutionary ideals and the island's present-day struggles.

The New Indian Express called Mad About Cuba as a compact report from the field, that brings out the author's love for Cuba and Cubans and his admiration for the small island for being a persistent David facing up to the American Goliath.

In his review in the Deccan Herald author Ameer Shahul described the book as a reminder that while Cuba may be defined by its defiance, it is sustained by its spirit — a spirit that the author captured with both reverence and wit. He recommended the book for anyone curious about Cuba and the changing world.

Business Standard said the book captures the observations as well as conversations of the author with various local people, including senior bureaucrats, scientists, students and tourists among others and explored the unique connection between Cuba and Kerala.

Hindustan Times, in its review, found noteworthy the author's narration of how Fidel Castro stunned Indira Gandhi with a bear hug and introduced her to Gabriel Garcia Marquez at the Non-Alignment Movement Summit in New Delhi in 1982.

Malayala Manorama said with a blend of personal anecdotes, historical insights, and thoughtful economic analysis, Mad About Cuba is a compelling narrative that weaves unexpected connections between Kerala and Cuba, offering a fresh perspective on two distinct yet ideologically intertwined regions.

The book also featured in Mail & Guardian, Frontline, Hindustan Times, Mint, The News Minute, The Wire, Consortium News, SAPAN News, Open, Prensa Latina, Reporter TV, Kairali News and other news outlets.

The author was interviewed by Newslaundry, Hindustan Times and News18 Malayalam on the book. To Newslaundry, he said he wrote the book to cut through the clutter of western-centric propaganda and focus on the hardships of the Cuban people in the face American sanctions that have restricted the island nation's sources of revenues, including remittances, export of goods and services and export of professional services. In the Hindustan Times Podcast, he said the US sanctions were not abstract but concrete measures to financially strangulate Cuba aimed at a regime change. News18 Malayalam review of his book focused on the similarities between the economic models of Kerala and Cuba, which are metaphors for redistribution-oriented policies.
