= K.K. Luthra Memorial Moot Court =

The K.K. Luthra Memorial Moot Court is a moot court started in 2005 in the memory of late Senior Advocate Mr. K.K. Luthra. This is the only international criminal law moot court held in India, and has seen participation from top law colleges in India and abroad. It is held every year in January at the Campus Law Centre in Delhi University.

The competition is named after late Senior Advocate K.K. Luthra, who was an eminent criminal lawyer and appeared in various trial courts, High Courts and the Supreme Court of India in a variety of matters during his legal career spanning 49 years. He was designated as a Senior Advocate of the Delhi High Court in 1984. During his long tenure at the Bar, he was the lead defence counsel in many important cases like the Baroda Dynamite Case, the L.N. Mishra murder case, Classik Computers Case, St. Kitts Case, the Coomar Narain Espionage Case and in the post-Emergency Shah Commission.

== Eligibility ==
Only one team is allowed to register from any college or law school. The members of the team should be undergraduate law students. The team should comprise two speakers or two speakers and a researcher.

== Moot Format ==
The competition is held in several rounds. The first being the memorial selection round and rest of them being oral rounds. For the memorial selection round, the teams that score seven more points out of a total of twenty points are deemed to be qualified. In 2019, a total of 50 teams qualified the memorial selection round with National Law University, Delhi getting the highest score.

During the moot court, the teams are given 40 minutes in the preliminary rounds to present oral arguments before the judges, both for the petitioner and the respondent. The teams that win two preliminary rounds qualify for the octafinal rounds which is then succeeded by quarterfinal, semifinal and final rounds. The teams get 40 minutes for their presentations in the semifinal and final rounds. The participants are judged on their ability to correlate the facts of the alleged crime with the laws that it has been booked under and to use different authorities and precedents to build and support one's arguments. In addition to these skills, the participants also get points for the memorial they submitted and for their oration and advocacy skills.

The final and semi-final rounds along with valedictory ceremony are held at the Indian Habitat Centre, New Delhi.

== 2017 Moot Court ==
The idea behind 2017's moot court problem was to make participants argue whether or not the actions and speech of a particular political figure qualified as seditious and could be punishable with the death penalty. It is set in a fictional democratic country Camelot which became independent in 1947 and adopted a federal constitution. A case of sedition was brought against a popular political leader of Camelot, Ms. Elizabeth Bennet, by the state government of Erehwon, the capital of Camelot. The teams had to argue the appeal which was pending before the Supreme Court of Camelot for final hearing.

The 2017 K.K. Luthra Memorial Moot Court competition was won by George Washington University, USA, while the Rajiv Gandhi National University of Law, Patiala, Punjab, bagged the second prize.

The inaugural address was delivered by Supreme Court judge, Justice Amitava Roy and the valedictory address was given by Supreme Court judge, Justice Arjan Kumar Sikri.
