= Laura Bentivoglio Davia =

Italian philosopher

- Born: Laura Bentivoglio; 1689
- Died: 1761 (aged 71–72)
- Occupation: Philosopher
- Spouse: Francesco Davia

Laura Bentivoglio Davia (1689–1761) was an Italian aristocratic philosopher engaged in the pursuit of knowledge and natural philosophy. She was known primarily for creating relationships with leading natural philosophers associated with the University of Bologna and the Istituto delle Scienze .

== Early years ==
Laura Bentivoglio and her sister were the last direct descendants of the Bentivoglio family that ruled over Bologna before their exile. In 1708, she married Francesco Davia (1677-1753), an ex-soldier, against her family wishes, and their relationship lasted 1715–1726. Most of her life, however, she lived with her husband's uncle. Cardinal Giovan Antonio Davia in Rimini. There she was educated by the Riminese physician Giovanni Bianchi in modern philosophy, and became involved in Cardinal Davia's scientific academy.

== Development of a Woman Philosopher ==
Francesco Davia played a major part in Laura's development into a philosopher. Francesco was unsure about Laura's love towards him. He would go to such extremes such as challenging men who have talked to Laura. He went so far as to dress up as a priest to listen for a confession to find out if she was unfaithful. He was caught and the event left him incarcerated for years. While he was in jail in 1711, she traveled back home with her son to separate from Francesco. When her husband was released from jail in 1715, he brought his wife's actions to Pope Benedict XIV. She had three choices, return to her husband, enter a monastery, or live with her husband's uncle Giovanni Antonio. In the end, she chose to live with Giovanni Antonio where she began her steps to become a philosopher.

Davia was the queen of aristocratic woman who were attracted to philosophy in the beginning of the eighteenth century. Because Italian women philosophers of that era were independent, those that had rebellious minds were fighting for social freedoms. During her stay with her uncle, she participated in some of the most interesting philosophical debates during that period.

== Education ==
To start, Davia immersed herself in her uncle's library. Women were not ridiculed for learning but encouraged in the philosophical community. Many scholars were eager to tutor aristocratic women in the sciences. One of these tutors was the physician Giovanni Bianchi (1693-1775). Laura was Giovanni's only female student, learning under his household which focused on scientific and philosophical learning. As Bianchi's intellectual credibility rose, so did his school and their knowledge branched out to questioning astronomy and philosophy to problems in anatomy. Most of the history of Biachi's schools activities and accomplishments are lost, however Davia's history can be retraced. As she grew as a philosopher over the years, she had been praised and gossiped about during the eighteenth century. For instance, Francesco Maria Zanotti wrote a poem about her, praising the philosopher and declaring that no woman in history would be able to accomplish what she had done. Eventually, he also became one of her other tutors. In Zanotti's opinion, he characterized her as independent, yet strong-headed because of her disdain for male philosophers when debating them. In addition, her popularity was so widespread that her name was heard outside of Rimini. Her studies and her philosophical education had paid off, gaining recognition from the highest of nobility. She was one of the few women philosophers that had her own opinions and was able to debate with male philosophers on an equal platform.

Davia was a firm advocate of not only Cartesian philosophy, but also of the idea that mind and body were separate entities. Through Cartesian science but also through conversations with colleagues, her opinion began to solidify towards its Newtonian counterpart, which focused on planetary motions and the possibility of a vacuum, also on the different aspects of human beings, including the psyche, and how nature reflects its divine creator. By the 1730s, Bentivoglio Davia was able to firmly establish her reputation as the leading female patron of science in the City of Bologna. She was unmoved by the results of Newton physics and her stance towards it was firmly cemented because her "rival" Laura Bassi supported it.

== Laura Bentivoglio vs Laura Bassi ==
During the spring of 1732, Laura Bassi started to gain momentum in the philosophy community. Laura Bassi (1711–1778), became the first woman to graduate from the University of Bologna and later the first woman to hold a university chair in Europe. Davia was annoyed of Bassi's success. Her criticisms of Bassi were spread throughout the community but the community took offense. Davia had to make a public apology because she feared that she would be stoned by her fellow citizens for not accepting Bassi. Due to the changes of Italian philosophy and education in the eighteenth century, it forced Davia's hand to reject Bassi and her views. In addition, Davia was backing Cartesian philosophy. She belonged to an international community of learned women who earned the approval of the Republic of Letters in the preceding century who previously included such people like Princess Elisabeth of Bohemia and Queen Christina of Sweden. Between the two there is a generation gap, therefore, they couldn't see eye to eye. Also, because Bassi wasn't an aristocrat, she was garnering more praise from critics than Davia which fueled her resentment towards Bassi.

== Reputation ==
Davia's reputation as a philosopher was hard to maintain. Her unwillingness to accept Laura Bassi's ability hurt her status as a philosopher, and she gained less recognition over the years because of her arrogance. Unlike Bassi, she was not admitted in Bologna Academy of Sciences, and could only attend those debates that were available to the public

After Laura Bassi took Davia's position as a philosopher, Davia changed her status to become a patron of philosophy. She engaged in philosophical correspondence and asked questions about multiple natural phenomena from the concept of light and electricity to why one person wears three pairs of socks. Because her position was lost, it is a possibility that she was barred from participating in philosophical discussions, to the point that she had to ask which new topics were from other philosophers whether or not those philosophers were of high status or not. During the late 1740s and 1750s, Davia became ill and her tutor Bianchi took the role as her physician. She gave him details of her physical condition and home-remedies that she'd tried. Essentially she became an experimental test subject, being analyzed by the medical community of Bologna until her death in 1761.

== Bibliography ==
1. Findlen, Paula, Wendy Wassyng Roworth, and Catherine M. Sama. Italy's Eighteenth Century: Gender and Culture in the Age of the Grand Tour. (Stanford, CA: Stanford University Press, 2009). ISBN 978-0804759045

2. Govoni, Paola, and Zelda Alice. Franceschi. Writing about Lives in Science: (auto)biography, Gender, and Genre. (Göttingen: V&r Unipress, 2014)

3. Janiak, Andrew, "Newton's Philosophy", The Stanford Encyclopedia of Philosophy (Summer 2014 Edition), Edward N. Zalta (ed.), URL = <http://plato.stanford.edu/archives/sum2014/entries/newton-philosophy/>.

4. Knott, Sarah, and Barbara Taylor. Women, Gender, and Enlightenment. (Houndmills, Basingstoke, Hampshire: Palgrave Macmillan,2005)

5. Messbarger, Rebecca. Benedict XIV and the Enlightenment. Ed. Christopher R.S Johns and Phillip Gavitt. (University of Toronto Press, n.d.)
