= Stalin K =

Stalin K.
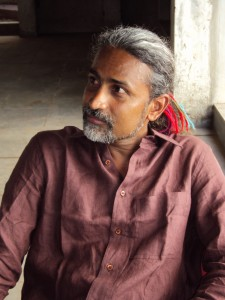
- Stalin K.
- Occupation: Filmmaker
- Known for: spearheading community media movements in India

Stalin K. is an Indian documentary filmmaker, media and human rights activist. His films, Lesser Humans and India Untouched, on the issue of caste and untouchability in contemporary India, have galvanized international attention to caste discrimination and won numerous film awards. He has done pioneering work on new models of community media to empower marginalized groups. His interview and clips from his film were featured in Episode 10: Dignity for All of Aamir Khan’s Satyamev Jayate TV series on the issue of Untouchability.

He co-founded the community media initiative Video Volunteers in 2003. In 2018, allegations were made against him of inappropriate conduct at the workspace. In 2020, the charges were dismissed.

== Biography ==
Stalin K. was born in Pune, and grew up in Gujarat. He studied Development Communication in Ahmedabad. Today he lives and works in Goa.

== Work ==
Stalin K. co-founded the Drishti Media Collective, a media and human rights organization based in Ahmedabad, India, as a trust in 1993. He was director of the organization until 2008. His work involved training marginalized groups in participatory media techniques as well as producing and distributing community stories to give these communities a voice in the public sphere.

In 2003, Stalin K. and Jessica Mayberry created Video Volunteers, which trains people from marginalized communities in India to report on issues affecting their own communities. He has trained and mentored the organization's community video creators since its founding. A 2024 profile by the Al Jazeera Journalism Review counted 248 creators, drawn from some of India's most marginalized groups.

He was the President and co-founder of Community Radio Forum of India, an association of community radio broadcasters and advocates. Along with other founders of the Forum he drafted the new Community Radio Policy. The policy is in operation since 2006 and secures communities the right to own and run their own radio stations. He set up one of the first community radio projects in Kutch, which covered stories from local communities.

In 2003 he co-conceived the Community Video Unit model of Video Volunteers. As Founder & India Director of Video Volunteers he set up media projects to empower community voices, until he stepped down from his role as Director of Video Volunteers on 13 October due to allegations of sexual misbehavior. In 2010 he launched the world's first ever Community News Feature Service, IndiaUnheard.

=== Campaigns and Events ===
Stalin K. designed more than 20 campaigns and events on various human rights issues including Cricket for Peace, Game4Change, Asia Social Forum and Making Caste Visible at UN World Conference Against Racism.

=== Teaching and Workshops ===
Stalin K. has conducted guest lectures and workshops on development communication and participatory media at universities and non-governmental organizations in India and the United States, including the Tata Institute of Social Sciences and Boston University. Through Video Volunteers, he has trained community correspondents in grassroots reporting and gender-sensitive documentation.

The community correspondent network he helped build at Video Volunteers has been the subject of academic research by political scientist Gabrielle Kruks-Wisner of the University of Virginia. In a study supported by the MIT Governance Lab, she found that about 16 percent of the correspondents' videos directly led to a solution, and that correspondents were most effective when they could persuade both community members and local officials to act. She also co-authored, with Dyuti Saunik, Avani Kapur and Jessica Mayberry, a 2021 article in the Economic and Political Weekly drawing on accounts from citizen journalists and front-line government workers in rural India during the COVID-19 pandemic. A Video Volunteers documentary about the network's pandemic work, Fixing India: How Community Media Like Video Volunteers Changed During COVID-19, won the Adaptation and Resilience award at the 2021 Global Sustainability Film Awards.

=== Films ===
Stalin K. made documentaries on social and human rights issues, like the riots in Gujarat against minorities, gender based discrimination and rights of tribal people in India and America. He filmed the riots against Muslim minorities in Gujarat 2002. The footage was used in court to prove that high rank officials of the state were involved in the riots. Stalin K. documented caste discrimination against the Dalit communities throughout India with his films IndiaUntouched and Lesser Humans. These films raised international attention to the discrimination of the Dalit communities in India.

== #Metoo Allegations & Inquiry ==
In October 2018, 2 women who have worked with Stalin K accused him of sexual harassment in the workplace. The allegations included inappropriate touching and unwanted advances. Institutions like The School of Media & Culture Studies at Tata Institute of Social Sciences, Mumbai and WITNESS released statements disassociating themselves from Stalin.

Stalin K issued a statement on Twitter denying any wrongdoing. In response, two more women, of whom were ex-employees and associates, came out with further allegations of sexual harassment against Stalin K that they had either undergone and heard about. On 18 October 2018, Video Volunteers released a statement which mentioned that Stalin K had stepped down from his position of 'Director' at 'Video Volunteers'. In July 2020, the Video Volunteers Board announced in a statement on its website that the Local Complaints Committee at the Office of the Collector North Goa dismissed the charge of sexual harassment against Stalin K. The note mentioned that the finding was in alignment with the results of an independent investigation by the Video Volunteers Board of Directors.

== Filmography ==
- 1992: 'Kali Kem Mari?/ Why Did Kali Die?', this film follows a social health worker dealing with the death of a village woman, Kali.
- 1992: 'A Bundleful of Fear/ Ek Poltlun Beek Nu', this is a dramatized narrative of 5 village women and their struggle for justice and gender equality.
- 1993: 'From Strength to Strength/ Basti se Basti tak', this is a film on the experiences of Shakti Mahila Sangathan, a women's group working in an urban slum called Millatnagar in Ahmedabad.
- 1994: 'These Forests are Ours/ Jungle Amaru Tantra Tamaru', this film focuses on the violation of human rights of the tribals, their right over their forests and the importance of consolidation of land and resources in the hands of the communities.
- 1994:'Ta Talati No Ta', this film seeks to demystify for rural audiences the functions, powers and duties of a Talati-cum-mantri (Land Record Officer), who in many cases becomes a focal point of bureaucratic power and cause of distress to many.
- 1995: 'Kalavar Mat/Triumph Over Time', the film discusses the reconstruction choices available to the victims of an earthquake in Maharashtra 1994, through the plays and songs of a traveling folk theatre group.
- 1996: 'Gam Nathi Koi Paanch Nu/ The Self in Self-Rule', in the context of the 73rd Amendment, reserving 33% panchayat seats for women, this film explores through a dramatic narrative the moral and ethical dilemmas that face a conscientious woman sarpanch, as she begins to negotiate the male-dominated, corrupt and self-serving world of politics.
- 1998: 'Lesser Humans', this film investigates the lives of manual scavengers, whose inhuman caste-based occupation is to manually dispose of human excreta.
- 1999: 'Patta Patta Akshar Hoga/ Every Leaf A Letter', the film documents the emergence of 'Jago Behna' in Dumka Jharkhand – a rural women's collective that was formed as result of the literacy campaign but went on to take up several other issues affecting their lives.
- 1999: 'Aftermath of the cyclone in Kutch', this film is a tool to draw attention and mobilize funds for rehabilitation, after a cyclone hit Kutch district of Gujarat in May 1999, for the second time in 2 years.
- 2002: 'Gujarat – A work in progress', the film unfolds the systematic violence on the minorities in Gujarat in 2002 with footage from the riots.
- 2005: 'Our Water, Our Future', a film that documents how in tribes in Wyoming, US have been unable to exercise their basic rights.
- 2007: 'India Untouched: Stories of a People Apart', documents Untouchability all over India showing the gravity of discrimination against Dalits and critiques the justification of this systematic oppression by the caste system.

== Awards and recognitions ==
2007 India Untouched:

- Silver Dhow, Second-best Documentary, Zanzibar International Film Festival, Tanzania, July 2008
- Golden Conch, Best Documentary, Mumbai International Film Festival, February 2008
- Best Film of the Festival, Mumbai International Film Festival, February 2008
- Best Documentary, Mahindra IAAC Film Festival, New York, November 2007
- Best Film, One Billion Eyes Film Festival, Chennai, India, August 2007

1993 Lesser Human

- Excellence Award, Earth Vision Film Festival, Tokyo, 1999
- Best Film, New Delhi Video Festival, 1999
- Silver Conch, 5th Mumbai International Film Festival, 1998
- Special Mention, Amnesty International Film Festival, Amsterdam, 1998

2007 India Untouched: Stories of a People Apart

- India Untouched* is a 108-minute documentary on the practice of untouchability across India. Stalin K. spent approximately four years traveling across eight Indian states and four religions — Hinduism, Islam, Christianity, and Sikhism — to document the persistence of caste-based discrimination. The film was co-produced by Drishti Media and the Navsarjan Trust.
- India Untouched* received the Golden Conch (Best Documentary) and Best Film of the Festival at the 10th Mumbai International Film Festival in 2008, Best Documentary at the Mahindra IAAC Film Festival in New York in 2007, and the Silver Dhow at the Zanzibar International Film Festival. It also screened at the Copenhagen International Documentary Film Festival in November 2007 and the Amnesty International Film Festival in the Netherlands in March 2008.

The film has been analyzed in academic literature, including in Prakash Louis's 2008 study published in *Contemporary Voice of Dalit*, where it is examined as a Dalit-perspective film. *India Untouched* has been used in educational settings internationally; it was screened at the Harvard Kennedy School in November 2024 as part of a program organized by the school's Casteless Caucus on caste discrimination.

In 2012, Stalin K. appeared in Episode 10 ("Dignity for All") of Aamir Khan's television program *Satyamev Jayate*. Clips from *India Untouched* were featured in the episode, which focused on untouchability in contemporary India.

Drishti Media Collective

Stalin K. co-founded Drishti Media Collective in Ahmedabad in 1991, a media and human rights organization based in Gujarat that uses media and arts in community-based programs. He was Director of Drishti until 2008. During his tenure, the organization produced more than 25 films on development and human rights issues, designed multiple rights-based campaigns, and conducted training workshops with NGOs across India.

Shabnam Virmani, the documentary filmmaker known for her work on Kabir, was a co-founder of Drishti Media.

Community Radio Forum of India

Stalin K. was a co-founder and the former Convener (until 2009) of the Community Radio Forum of India, an association of community radio broadcasters and advocates. He was part of the group that helped draft India's Community Radio Policy, which came into effect in 2006 and allowed non-profit organizations to apply for community radio licenses.

He participated in setting up community radio projects in the Kutch region of Gujarat, in collaboration with the Kutch Mahila Vikas Sangathan, which launched its first radio series in 1999 and produced programming throughout the period after the 2001 Bhuj earthquake.
