= Vijaya Kishore Rahatkar =

Indian politician

Vijaya Rahatkar
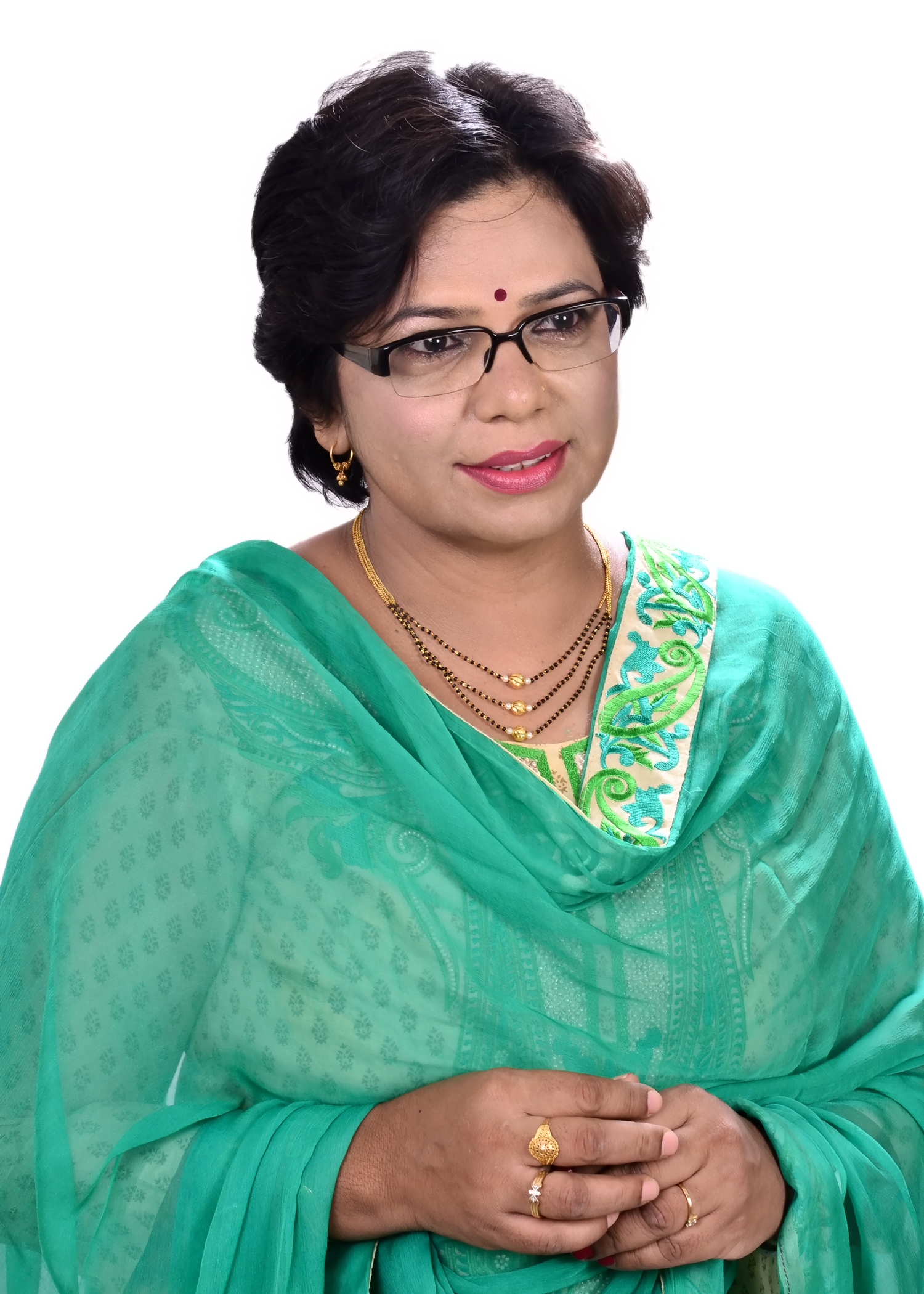

9th Chairperson National Commission for Women
- Incumbent
- Assumed office 19 October 2024
- Preceded by: Rekha Sharma

Chairperson Maharashtra State Commission for Woman
- In office 2016–2021
- Succeeded by: Rupali Chakankar

Mayor Aurangabad Municipal Corporation
- In office 29 October 2007 – 28 April 2010

Personal details
- Born: 21 August 1966 (age 60) Aurangabad, Aurangabad district, Maharastra
- Party: Bharatiya Janata Party
- Spouse: Kishore Rahatkar
- Children: Kalyani Rahatkar
- Profession: Politician

Vijaya Kishore Rahatkar (born 21 August 1966) is an Indian politician and currently serving as the 9th chairperson of the National Commission for Women, India.

Vijaya Rahatkar spearheaded initiatives like “Sakshama” (support for acid attack survivors), “Prajwala” (linking self-help groups to central government schemes), and “Suhita” (24x7 helpline service for women). She also worked on legal reforms focusing on issues like POCSO, anti-triple talaq cells, and anti-human trafficking units and introduced digital literacy programs, launched a publication named “Saad” dedicated to women's issues.

== Bibliography ==
- Vidhilikhit (on women's legal issues)
- Aurangabad: Leading to Wide Roads
