= Samar Halarnkar =

Indian journalist

- Born: North Karnataka, India
- Occupation(s): Journalist, Editor
- Title: Editor, IndiaSpend.com, Article 14
- Spouse: Priya Ramani

Samar Halarnkar was editor of IndiaSpend.com. He also contributes to Mint, the business newspaper from Hindustan Times group, and is a columnist and editor of Article 14.

== Early life ==
Samar Halarnkar was born in north Karnataka. He has an M.A degree from the University of Missouri.

Halarnkar's father, PG Halarnkar, was a retired Indian Police Service officer and former Commissioner of Police of Bengaluru.

== Career ==
Halarnkar started his career in print media in the year 1990 with The Times of India, Bangalore as a crime reporter.

In 2002, Halarnkar, when working with The Indian Express, daily wrote extensively on lending given by public sector banks to big industrialists such as Wipro, Tata and Mahindra & Mahindra. Before joining The Hindustan Times, he was resident editor, The Indian Express. Prior to Express, he has worked for other media houses like the India Today Group. He joined the Hindustan Times as editor, national investigations, in Mumbai in May 2006.

Samar Halarnkar writes on a variety of topics including poverty, social issues and economic issues. He also writes on food and cooking in his blog titled 'Our Daily Bread'. Halarnkar is a columnist and editor of Article 14, a website about the rule of law in India.

In 2012 he was accused of plagiarising the work of Frances Moore Lappé for a part of one of his articles leading to mixed reactions from the journalistic community in India.

== India Love Project ==
On October 28, 2020, Halarnkar, his wife Priya Ramani, and their friend Niloufer Venkatraman created the India Love Project on Instagram, "a celebration of interfaith/inter-caste love and togetherness in these divisive, hate-filled times." The Project began in response to backlash against an advertising campaign that featured an interfaith couple, and has expanded to help couples find legal and counseling assistance. A December 2020 Vogue India profile on the India Love Project quotes Halarnkar as explaining, "We see ILP as an attempt at unity, a chronicle of love outside the shackles of faith, caste, ethnicity and gender."

== Personal life ==
Halarnkar is married to the journalist Priya Ramani.
