= Video Volunteers =

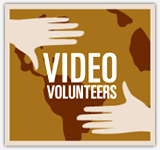
- Founder: Jessica Mayberry
- Type: Community Media
- Purpose: Media, Livelihood, Human Rights, Arts and Culture, Caste and Identity, Conflict, Development, Education, Environment, Gender, Health, Infrastructure, Corruption, Technology
- Location: New York
- Key people: Stalin K, Davia Temin

Video Volunteers is an international NGO founded in 2003 that promotes community media to amplify citizen voice around the world. Video Volunteers is a registered non-profit in the state of New York in the US.

== History ==
Video Volunteers was founded in 2003 by Jessica Mayberry after she spent a year as a fellow of the American India Foundation training rural Indian women in filmmaking. Video Volunteers originally operated from offices in New York, NY. Mayberry works closely with India Director Stalin K, Indian documentary filmmaker and community radio activist, as well as original co-founder of Drishti Media, Arts and Human Rights.

== Work ==
VV's models for locally owned and managed media production teach people to articulate and share their perspectives on the issues that matter to them – on a local and a global scale. Through communication media, Video Volunteers offers a livelihood option for people from poor areas while also providing a service to those communities. To this end, VV uses their low-cost community media models. In 2018, researchers from the MIT Governance Lab visited VV correspondents in Bihar and Jharkhand, where VV had 60 correspondents, as early field work for the research later led by Kruks-Wisner. They reported that correspondents, often working alongside residents, petition local officials over infrastructure problems such as broken hand pumps, latrines that were promised but never built, and lack of electricity, as well as social issues including gender-based violence and caste discrimination.

Video Volunteers trains community correspondents from marginalized and underrepresented communities in India to report on issues affecting their own communities, including governance, gender equality, health, education, social justice, and access to public services. The organization's community media model focuses on enabling local residents to produce journalism and documentary reporting about issues that are often underrepresented in mainstream media. Community correspondents receive training in reporting, video production, storytelling, and community engagement.

Video Volunteers' flagship initiative, IndiaUnheard, is a network of community correspondents that produces reporting from rural and underserved regions of India. The initiative was established to amplify perspectives that are frequently absent from mainstream news coverage and to enable communities to document local challenges and advocate for change.

In a 2024 profile, the Al Jazeera Journalism Review described Video Volunteers as a network of community video creators from some of India's most marginalized groups. The publication reported that the organization's correspondents document local issues and produce reporting on topics including gender, health, education, social justice, and public services in rural communities.

According to the International Journalists' Network, Video Volunteers operates a nationwide network of community storytellers and citizen journalists, many of whom come from historically underrepresented communities and use participatory media to report on local issues and civic concerns.

== Programs ==
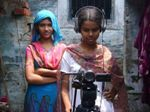

IndiaUnheard, is a program that is constituted of a network of "community correspondents" who are stringers trained to tell stories about their own communities. IndiaUnheard Community Correspondents make 3-4 min videos for which they were paid Rs 1300 each. These videos are later shown on social networking sites and sometimes on TV which link rural communities with a truly global audience. All VV programs are run in collaboration with others.

This was Video Volunteers’ flagship Community Video Unit program, created in partnership with many of the leading NGOs in India, establishes and equips locally operated video production units in severely media-deprived areas, where VV designed the concept and local organizations executed them. By training eight – ten local Community Producers that make up each unit in all aspects of video production, this enables them to produce films that address issues relevant to their community, such as child marriage, health, temple prostitution, water, sanitation and women's rights. Regular screenings of the films are held for hundreds of villagers in their locale, followed by solution-centric discussions that transform ideas and images into proactive measures. However, currently none of the CVU are in production for lack of fund.

In Eastern Uttar Pradesh, one of the most underdeveloped areas in India, Video Volunteers has initiated, as part of the UNDP-IKEA a large scale micro credit initiative called Saksham. Enterprising women from within the self-help groups formed under the micro credit initiative are given training in photography and video production. By developing communication skills, the project intends women themselves to be able to document and monitor the changes.

In 2009 Video Volunteers had this program in partnership with the Brazilian NGO Casa das Caldeiras to launch 'VCU.br. This program selects ten graduates of Brazilian favela media programs and trains them over a course of a year in producing and distributing videos for mainstream TV.

The Community Radio Forum-India is a registered association of community radio broadcasters, researchers and advocates in India. Video Volunteers was the secretariat of the Community Radio Forum (CRF) from September 2008 to February 2010, and Stalin K, the Managing Trustee of Video Volunteers-India, is the former Convener of the forum. CRF believes in the power of community radio, is committed to democratization of India's airwaves and works to enable community organizations to set up their own Community Radio Station.

Videoshala started in 2007 as a joint project by Video Volunteers and two Gujarat-based NGOs, Drishti and Udaan. Videoshala is a program that trains community members how to produce educational videos, using the visual medium to incorporate values of democracy, diversity and citizenship in the video kits. Locally trained producers from the community produce the educational videos and screen them in schools. The films are screened to children in 200 schools throughout the state of Gujarat.

In the year 2009, Video Volunteers partnered with Global Fund for children (GFC) in a pilot project called Videoactive Girls. Under the project, which was a learning initiative of The Nike Foundation's Brain Trust of Practitioners, VV developed a toolkit on how community-based organizations and the adolescent girls they serve can harness, produce and use the power of the visual media to tell their stories.

== Research ==
In collaboration with the Indian Institute of Management, Ahmedabad, India's leading business school, VV conducted a research project to explore methods of evolving community-based media to generate high levels of financial sustainability. IIM's centre for Innovation, Incubation and Entrepreneurship and VV work together to explore methods and possibilities of generating revenue through the mainstream media in collaboration with other NGOs. Another area that the project aims to explore is how such community video businesses can be supported by micro credit lending.

Political scientist Gabrielle Kruks-Wisner of the University of Virginia studied VV's community correspondents in a research collaboration with VV and the MIT Governance Lab. Her 2022 study, published in Comparative Political Studies, found that about 16 percent of correspondents' videos directly led to a solution, and that correspondents were most effective when they could persuade both community members and local officials to act.

== Me Too Allegations ==
In October 2018, allegations of inappropriate behaviour at the workplace were made on social media against India Director & Founder Stalin K. In July 2020, the Video Volunteers Board announced in a statement on its website that the Local Complaints Committee at the Office of the Collector North Goa dismissed the charge of sexual harassment against Stalin K. The post also mentioned that this finding was in alignment with the results of an independent investigation by the Video Volunteers Board of Directors.

== Honors and awards ==
Video Volunteers has received grants from the Knight News Challenge and the Echoing Green Foundation. VV won a 2006 Tech Museum Award and the NYU Stern Business School Social Business Plan Competition in 2008.

Video Volunteers has carried out projects or collaborated with organizations in more than 10 countries, including the US, India, and Brazil, and has partnered with such organizations as Witness, the Global Fund for Children, Pangea Day, MTV, and others. VV was short-listed by the Development Gateway Awards, and in 2008 they were one of the five shortlisted organizations for the King Baudouin Foundation (of Belgium) International Development Prize.

Co-founder Jessica Mayberry was named an Echoing Green Global Fellow in 2007 and an Ashoka Fellow in 2012. She is also a TED Fellow.

== Collaborations ==
Video Volunteers has engaged in partnership, funding, consultancy and training relationships with many leading organizations, including the UNDP, Witness, the Fledgling Fund, the Art Action Foundation of Singapore, The Global Fund for Children, Pangea Day, International Youth Foundation, HIVOS, Creative Visions Foundation and Goethe-Institut. Concepts developed by Video Volunteers have been supported by USAID, UNESCO, and the Sir Dorabji Tata Trust. In May 2010, Video Volunteers acted as the community media partner for the UN's World Summit of the Information Society (WSIS) Forum. Video Volunteers’ work has been featured on MTV, Nickelodeon, Al Jazeera, The Star Network, Pangea Day, several CNN platforms, prominent Indian news stations, and Current TV.
