= Rupali Chakankar =

Indian politician

Rupali Borate-Chakankar

Chairperson, Maharashtra State Commission for Woman
- In office 19 October 2021 – 20 March 2026
- Preceded by: Vijaya Kishore Rahatkar

Personal details
- Born: 28 May 1982 (age 44) Pune, Maharashtra
- Party: Nationalist Congress Party (NCP)
- Spouse: Nilesh Chakankar
- Profession: Politician

Rupali Chakankar is an Indian politician from Maharashtra who previously served as the chairperson of the Maharashtra State Women's Commission (MSCW).

As of late 2025, she remained a key leader in the Nationalist Congress Party (NCP), specifically the faction led by Deputy Chief Minister Ajit Pawar.

She resigned from her post as MSCW head and as the state president of her party's women's wing after her association with self-styled astrologer Ashok Kharat was revealed.

Sushma Andhare from Shiv Sena (UBT) alleged that Chakankar had a conflict of interest in a sexual harassment case involving Bollywood director Anu Malik, whom she had cleared, after which her son appeared in one of his films.

== Political career ==
- Chairperson, Maharashtra State Women's Commission (MSCW)

First appointed in October 2021, she was re-appointed to the position in October 2024. She resigned from the position in March 2026.

- NCP Women's Wing President

She served as the state president of the NCP's women's wing (Rashtrawadi Mahila Congress). She resigned from the position in March 2026.
