= The Asian Age =

English-language Indian daily newspaper

- Type: Daily newspaper
- Format: Print, online
- Founder: M. J. Akbar
- Publisher: Deccan Chronicle Holdings Limited
- Editor-in-chief: Aditya Sinha
- Editor: Seema Mustafa
- Founded: February 1994; 32 years ago
- Political alignment: Centre
- Language: English
- City: Delhi, Mumbai, Kolkata and London
- Country: India
- Circulation: 1,000,000
- Sister newspapers: Deccan Chronicle
- Website: asianage.com

The Asian Age is an English-language Indian daily newspaper with editions published in Delhi, Mumbai and Kolkata. It also prints an "international edition" in London. It was launched in February 1994.

The same publishing company also produces the Deccan Chronicle.

== Notable people ==
- M. J. Akbar – founder and erstwhile editor-in-chief of The Asian Age until 2013
- T. Venkattram Reddy – editor-in-chief appointed in 2013
- Seema Mustafa – erstwhile resident editor and bureau chief of The Asian Age
