= Davia Temin =

Davia B. Temin is a writer, speaker, and management consultant based in New York. She is president and CEO of Temin and Company Incorporated, an international reputation, risk and crisis management, strategic marketing and media, and leadership coaching firm that specializes in crisis preparation, management, communication and recovery, as well as corporate governance and corporate culture consulting. She is the creator of the Temin Index, the largest known inventory of #MeToo accusations since sexual misconduct allegations surfaced against Bill Cosby. She is also the author of the "Reputation Matters" column of Forbes.com, and is a contributor for Huffington Post, American Banker, Directors & Boards, Corporate Board Member, Institutional Investor and Chief Executive Magazine.

== Biography ==
Prior to founding Temin and Company in 1997, Temin ran marketing, strategy, external affairs and crisis management for: General Electric Capital; Schroders in the US; Wertheim Schroder; Scudder, Stevens and Clark; Citicorp Investment Bank; and Columbia Business School, where she founded their magazine, Hermes. She also served on the executive staff of the governor of Massachusetts.

From 2005 to 2014, Temin served as the first vice chair of the board of the Girl Scouts of the United States of America and chair of its Fund Development Committee. She spearheaded the largest campaign for girls in history when she announced their $1 Billion Campaign for Girls, for the Girl Scouts’ 100th Anniversary. Girl Scouts of the USA announced the successful completion of that $1 Billion campaign, “ToGetHerThere.” Currently, she is on the board of Girl Scouts of Greater New York. She is chair of the board of Video Volunteers, the India-based nonprofit that trains community investigative reporters to videotape the stories and injustices that surround them, and then show those videos on television, the Internet and in their town squares, in order to promote social justice.

A native of Cleveland, Ohio, Temin is an honors graduate of Swarthmore College, where she was a member of the board of managers until her resignation in September 2020, citing an on-going lawsuit against her and her company as the reason for her stepping down; Both Temin and the company denied the claims in the lawsuit and it was ultimately dismissed without a finding of any wrongdoing by any party. Temin had previously served as chair of the College’s Long Range Planning Committee on Visibility and Leadership in Higher Education. She attended Columbia University for her graduate degree. She was a founding board member of The White House Project, and currently serves as a trustee or advisory board member of the Committee for Economic Development, ProPublica, Harvard Kennedy School Women’s Leadership Board, Columbia Journalism School’s Knight-Bagehot Fellowship in Business and Journalism, WomenCorporateDirectors (WCD), WCD New York Leadership Council, and Predmore Holdings. She is a member of the Columbia University Women Creating Change Leadership Council, and also serves as an advisor to Chinook.ai and SpringBoard.ai.

In August 2020, Temin faced controversy when a former employee of Temin and Company sued Temin on grounds of wage theft, racial discrimination, and workplace retaliation. Temin subsequently resigned from her position on the board of managers at Swarthmore College, her alma mater. Temin denied the claims in the lawsuit and it was ultimately dismissed without a finding of wrongdoing by any party.

=== Awards and honors ===
In 2018, Temin was named an Enterprising Woman of the Year by Enterprising Women magazine. Temin was honored by the National Organization for Women, accepting their 2017 Woman of Power & Influence Award for forging new paths for the next generation of women leaders. She also received the Lifetime Achievement Award by Trust Across America-Trust Around the World and was named as a "Top 100 Thought Leaders in Trustworthy Business Behavior" for five consecutive years (2013-2017) for "an extensive and positive contribution to building trust in business." In 2015, Temin received the Girl Scouts of New York's highest honor, the Pinnacle Award for Leadership, honoring her work as a business leader and role model for girls and women both within Girl Scouting and the greater community. Temin was chosen as a delegate of the U.S. State Department to the Global Entrepreneurship Program to Greece in 2014. In 2012 she was named one of "30 Outstanding Women" helping girls and women around the world by the National Council of Research on Women. She has also been honored by the Girl Scouts of New York as their "Woman of Distinction."

=== Personal life ===
Temin is married to Walter Kicinski, a former municipal banker, former chief financial and administrative officer of the New York State Power Authority, and former deputy chief of staff to the Governor of New York. She is featured in several books, including Wall Street Women by Anne Fisher (Alfred A. Knopf, 1990), A Woman’s Guide to Successful Negotiating: How to Convince, Collaborate, & Create Your Way to Agreement by Lee E. Miller and Jessica Miller (McGraw-Hill, 2002), The Board Game: How Smart Women Become Corporate Directors by Betsy Berkhemer-Credaire (Angel City Press, 2013), Stiletto Network by Pamela Ryckman (AMACOM, 2013), and Broad Influence: How Women Are Changing the Way Americas Works (Time Books, 2016). Temin has also written "Rebuilding Trust in the Financial Markets," a chapter in Trust, Inc. by Barbara Brooks Kimmel (Next Decade, 2013) and a chapter on crisis leadership for Women on Board – Insider Secrets to Getting on a Board and Succeeding as a Director.
