= M. J. Akbar =

Indian journalist and politician (born 1951)

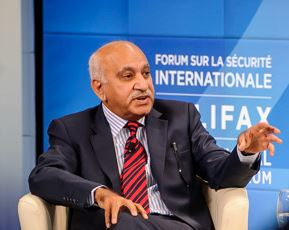
- Akbar at Halifax International Security Forum in 2014

Minister of State for External Affairs
- In office 5 July 2016 – 17 October 2018
- Prime Minister: Narendra Modi

Member of Parliament in Rajya Sabha
- In office June 2016 – 29 June 2022
- Constituency: Madhya Pradesh

Personal details
- Born: Mobasher Jawed Akbar; 11 January 1951 (age 75) Telenipara, West Bengal, India
- Party: Indian National Congress (1989–2014); Bharatiya Janata Party (since 2014)
- Occupation: Journalist, politician, writer

Mobasher Jawed Akbar (born 11 January 1951) is an Indian journalist and politician, who served as the Minister of State (MoS) for External Affairs until 17 October 2018. Akbar is a Member of Parliament in the Rajya Sabha, and was inducted into the Union Council of Ministers by PM Narendra Modi on 5 July 2016. He is also a veteran Indian journalist and author of several books. He was a Member of Parliament between 1989 and 1991, and returned to public life in March 2014 when he joined the BJP and was appointed national spokesperson during the 2014 general elections that brought the party back to office with a simple majority under the leadership of Narendra Modi. In July 2015 he was elected to the Rajya Sabha from Jharkhand. During his long career in journalism, he launched, as editor, India's first weekly political news periodicals, including India Today, Headlines Today, The Telegraph, The Asian Age and Deccan Chronicle, among others.

He has written several non-fiction books, including a biography of Jawaharlal Nehru titled Nehru: The Making of India, a book on Kashmir titled Kashmir Behind the Vale, Riot After Riot and India: The Siege Within. He also authored The Shade of Swords, a history of jihad. Akbar has also authored fiction, such as Blood Brothers-A Family Saga (Fratelli Di Sangue, Italian translated version). Have Pen, Will Travel: Observations of a Globetrotter is a travelogue authored by him. His book 'Byline' consists of write-ups of bylines picked from his writings. His book Tinderbox: The past and future of Pakistan, in January 2012 discusses the themes of identity crisis and class struggles in Pakistan. On 17 October 2018, Akbar resigned due to a number of sexual harassment allegations against him from numerous women who had worked with him over the years. Akbar has denied all such accusation and allegations.

He had filed a case against Priya Ramani for defamation who had accused Akbar of sexual harassment. Akbar had lost the case at the trial courts. As reported by Indian Express, court said, "A woman has the right to put grievances before any platform of her choice even after decades. Reading out the order, the court said that there are social stigma attached with the allegations. Society must understand the impact of sexual abuse and harassment on its victims." The court also mentioned that in case of grievances, a fresh appeal could be filed. While Akbar didn't comment on the decision, one of his lawyers Niharika Karanjawala remarked that they disagree with the court and will appeal. Akbar then approached the Delhi High Court and pleaded against the acquittal.

== Career ==
Akbar joined The Times of India in 1971 as a trainee. Subsequently, he moved to The Illustrated Weekly of India, then India's largest-selling magazine, working as a sub-editor as well as distinguishing himself as a feature writer capable of contributing a prolific number of stories. He would remain with the weekly until 1973 when he was named editor of the news fortnightly, Onlooker, owned by The Free Press Journal Group in Mumbai. In 1976, he moved to Calcutta to join the Ananda Bazar Patrika (ABP) Group as editor of Sunday, a political weekly. Within just three years of its launch, the investigative reporting pioneered by the magazine established its national circulation and number one position. The magazine took an uncompromising stand against the Emergency and fought press censorship and dictatorship. Sunday not only established major trends in journalism but also spawned a new generation of journalists in the country.

In 1982, after the success of The Sunday, Akbar launched what is considered by some to be India's first modern newspaper. He conceived, designed and edited the daily newspaper, The Telegraph.

In 1989, he took a brief detour into politics with his election to the Indian Parliament in November 1989 from Kishanganj in Bihar on a Congress(I) ticket. He lost the seat in the 1991 Lok Sabha elections. He served as late Prime Minister Rajiv Gandhi's official spokesman.

In 1991, Akbar joined the Government as an adviser in the Ministry of Human Resources, and helped policy planning in key areas of education, the National Literacy Mission and in the protection of heritage. He resigned from the post and left politics in December 1992, returning to journalism and full-time writing. In 1993, Akbar started a new media company with the aim of creating India's first newspaper that would not only include an international focus within its editorial range, but also be the first Indian daily with an international edition. This newspaper appeared in February 1994. The Asian Age was launched with initial editions in Delhi, Bombay, and London, and by 2008 had grown, in collaboration with the Deccan Chronicle, to eight editions, into a major media presence nationally and internationally. In 2004, the group began publishing The International Herald Tribune in India, and became a publishing partner of The New York Times. Akbar was also the editor-in-chief of The Deccan Chronicle, a Hyderabad-based news daily.

In 2005, King Abdullah of Saudi Arabia appointed him as a member of the committee to draft a ten-year charter for Muslim nations on behalf of the Organisation of Islamic Cooperation.

In March 2006, Akbar joined the Brookings Institution, Washington, as a visiting fellow in the Brookings Project on U.S. Policy Towards the Islamic World. During the late 1990s, he diluted his stake in the Asian Age, eventually selling off a major part of it to the owners of the Deccan Chronicle Group.

In March 2008, Akbar was removed from The Asian Age and Deccan Chronicle due to differences with the owners over editorial policy, as some newspapers have reported it.

Akbar launched the fortnightly political magazine Covert on 13 May 2008 in Delhi with the first issue on stands on 14 May. Simultaneously, the Covert website was launched two days later though it was ultimately discontinued.

Akbar launched a new Sunday newspaper from 31 January 2010, The Sunday Guardian, published from New Delhi and Chandigarh besides an edition called India on Sunday from London. He remained the Editor-in-Chief and then Editorial Director there until May 2014, when he resigned to join politics full-time.

In the meanwhile, in September 2010, he joined the Living Media as Editorial Director of the leading weekly English news magazine India Today and the English news channel Headlines Today. He left in October 2012.

== #MeToo controversy ==
The controversy began when the journalist Priya Ramani writing an article at Vogue about sexual harassment in context of the 'Me Too' Movement in India. She had written a general article on attitude of male bosses and recalled her own experience and decided to include it. At first, no name was given. However, a year later, Ramani decided to name MJ Akbar as the person she was referring to through Twitter. Other female colleagues before and after the tweet had also accused Akbar of sexual harassment. He was accused of sexual harassment also by UK-based journalist Ruth David, CNN scribe Majlie de Puy Kamp, Saba Naqvi, journalist and author Ghazala Wahab, journalist Sutapa Paul, and journalist Suparna Sharma, amongst others.

On 14 October 2018, he made an official statement saying that he found the allegations against him as "wild and baseless" and that he planned to take legal recourse against the women who accused him. Akbar filed a criminal defamation case against Priya Ramani on 15 October 2018 with representation by Geeta Luthra. BBC reported Akbar's response, "In court, he denied the incident alleged by Ms Ramani - he said he had not asked her to meet him at his hotel, or that she called him from the hotel reception, or that he called her to his room." Regarding the accusations of other women, Akbar used Twitter to remark that such accusations were politically motivated.

However, the accusations are by a multitude of women, across time and locations. As of 17 October, the count of accusations stood at 20: all of the women signed a petition to the court where Akbar's defamation case is to be heard, asking that they too, be heard. Following this, Akbar resigned from his post on 17 October 2018.

In an op-ed in Washington Post on 2 November 2018, Pallavi Gogoi, the chief business editor for NPR in the United States, wrote of her rape by Akbar 23 years ago in a hotel room in Jaipur. Gogoi was the editor of the op-ed page of the Asian Age at that time. In response, Akbar has admitted to a past relationship with Gogoi, and said it was consensual.

On 17 February 2021, he lost defamation case against journalist Priya Ramani who accused him of sexual harassment. The Delhi court said, "a woman has right to voice her grievance even after several years" on the judgement. MJ Akbar subsequently appealed to Delhi High Court. On 11 August 2021 the Delhi High Court issued a notice to journalist Priya Ramani based on the plea filed by MJ Akbar.

== Politics ==
Akbar was a Congress MP from Kishanganj in Bihar between 1989 and 1991, he was also a Congress party spokesperson in 1989.

Akbar joined the Bharatiya Janata Party in March 2014 as the national spokesperson of the party.

He was elected to Rajya Sabha from Jharkhand in July 2015.

He took oath as Minister of State for External Affairs in Rashtrapati Bhavan on 5 July 2016. He resigned from his post on 17 October 2018, after a growing number of sexual allegations were made against him.

== Personal life ==
Akbar is married to Mallika Joseph, his contemporary at The Times of India. They have two children, Prayaag an alumnus of Dartmouth College and Mukulika a Law graduate from Jesus College, Cambridge.

== Books ==
- Nehru : the Making of India (1990)
- Riot After Riot (1991)
- Kashmir: Behind the Vale (1991)
- India: The Siege within - Challenges to a Nation's Unity (1996)
- The Shade of Swords: Jihad and the Conflict between Islam and Christianity (2003)
- Byline (2004)
- Blood Brothers - A Family Saga (2006)
- Have Pen, Will Travel (2010)
- Tinderbox: The Past and Future of Pakistan (2012)
- A Mirror to Power: The Politics of a Fractured Decade, HarperCollins India, 2015.
- After Me, Chaos: Astrology in the Mughal Empire, HarperCollins India, 2015.
