= Rafta Rafta (Indian TV series) =

2023 Indian romantic comedy web series

- Promotional poster
- Genre: Comedy; Romance
- Written by: Abbas Dalal; Hussain Dalal; Chris George; Husain Hardawala
- Directed by: Vishal Shankar Gupta
- Starring: Bhuvan Bam; Srishti Ganguli Rindani
- Country of origin: India
- Original language: Hindi
- No. of seasons: 1
- No. of episodes: 7

Production
- Producers: Bhuvan Bam; Rohit Raj
- Cinematography: Bijitesh De
- Camera setup: Single-camera
- Running time: 14–18 minutes
- Production company: BB Ki Vines

Original release
- Network: Amazon miniTV
- Release: 25 January 2023

Rafta Rafta is a 2023 Indian Hindi romantic comedy web series directed by Vishal Shankar Gupta and produced by BB Ki Vines, with Bhuvan Bam and Rohit Raj serving as producers. The seven-episode series premiered on January 25, 2023, and is available for free streaming on Amazon miniTV through the Amazon Shopping app.

The series features Bhuvan Bam and Srishti Ganguli Rindani as a newly married couple adjusting to their relationship while encountering various situations in early marital life. The narrative incorporates elements of situational comedy and domestic life.

== Premise ==
The series follows Karan and Nithya, a newly married couple with contrasting personalities who are brought together by unforeseen circumstances. As they adjust to life as husband and wife, they encounter a range of everyday challenges, including intrusive neighbors, unexpected visitors, and frequent misunderstandings. Despite their differences, the couple gradually begins to understand each other better, and their relationship evolves from initial awkwardness to genuine emotional intimacy.

== Cast ==
- Bhuvan Bam as Karan Malhotra
- Srishti Ganguli Rindani as Nithya Nair
- Enab Khizra as Laxmi
- Rakesh Bedi as Mr. Sharma
- Kamini Khanna as Mrs. Sharma
- Jaineeraj Rajpurohit as Atul Mama
- Atul Srivastava as Mangal Chacha
- Vijayant Kohli as Gautam Malhotra
- Madhu Sachdeva as Shalini Malhotra
- Vijay Meenu as Vidya Nair
- Ritika Arora as Tanya
- RJ Kisna as Michael D'costa
- Ashish Singh as Interviewer (video call)

== Episodes ==
=== Season 1 (2023) ===
No. overall	No. in season	Title	Directed by	Written by	Original release date
1	1	"Shagun"	Vishal Shankar Gupta	Abbas Dalal, Hussain Dalal	25 January 2023
Karan and Nithya settle into their new home as a married couple and are welcomed by their overly enthusiastic neighbors, the Sharmas. When the Sharmas leave their grandson with the couple for a day, chaos follows—but also a growing bond between the two.
2	2	"One Two Cha Cha"	Vishal Shankar Gupta	Abbas Dalal, Hussain Dalal	25 January 2023
Karan’s eccentric uncle Chachaji arrives uninvited and announces an extended stay. While Karan is excited, Nithya is quickly annoyed by Chachaji's behavior, leading to friction and a clever counter by Nithya.
3	3	"Elon Mouse"	Vishal Shankar Gupta	Abbas Dalal, Hussain Dalal	25 January 2023
An argument over a sandwich turns into a joint battle with a mouse in their house. Despite multiple failed attempts, a twist from their neighbor Mr. Sharma brings comic relief and laughter.
4	4	"Made in India"	Vishal Shankar Gupta	Abbas Dalal, Hussain Dalal	25 January 2023
A runaway romance between their driver Pandey and maid Laxmi leads to police involvement and family chaos. Karan finds himself wrongly accused until the help returns and clears the air.
5	5	"Rakshas Ki Hawas"	Vishal Shankar Gupta	Abbas Dalal, Hussain Dalal	25 January 2023
A casual movie night turns eerie when strange happenings mimic the horror film they watched. A suspenseful sequence ends in a humorous twist when the “ghost” is revealed.
6	6	"Ex Ki Shaadi"	Vishal Shankar Gupta	Abbas Dalal, Hussain Dalal	25 January 2023
Flashbacks reveal how Karan and Nithya’s friendship turned romantic and led to an unplanned marriage after an awkward incident at work. The present-day argument triggers memories of their origin.
7	7	"Pyaar Dosti Hai"	Vishal Shankar Gupta	Abbas Dalal, Hussain Dalal	25 January 2023
A final argument prompts Nithya to seek out her artistic passion, while Karan receives unexpected wisdom from a local ironwala. In a heartfelt climax, the couple confesses their love and enjoys their first true date.

== Production ==
=== Development ===
- Rafta Rafta was co-produced by YouTube personality Bhuvan Bam under his production banner BB Ki Vines. The show was directed by Vishal Shankar Gupta and written by Abbas Dalal, Hussain Dalal, Chris George, and Husain Hardawala.

=== Filming and Technical Crew ===
The cinematography was handled by Bijitesh De. Production design was led by Nadiri Tariq Khan and Tariq Umar Khan. Costume design was by Hinna Akhtar, with makeup by Payal Bhatia and Sakshi Deshwal Malik. The sound team included Vaishakh Karivellur (foley editor) and Niranjan Rasne (dialogue editor). Visual promotions were led by Vasudevan Kothandath, Dorin Mehta, and Roshan Navghare.

== Release ==
The series premiered on January 25, 2023, on Amazon miniTV, a free streaming service accessible via the Amazon Shopping app.

== Reception and awards ==
Rafta Rafta received generally positive reviews for its light-hearted tone and performances. Critics praised Bhuvan Bam’s portrayal of a maturing partner and Srishti Ganguli Rindani’s grounded performance. The writing was noted for blending situational humor with emotional nuance without veering into melodrama. The fifth episode, in particular, was highlighted as a comedic high point.

=== Awards ===
Awards and nominations for Rafta Rafta (2023 web series)
Year	Award	Category	Recipient	Result	Ref
2023	Filmfare OTT Awards	Best Actor – Comedy	Bhuvan Bam	Nominated	"Nominations for the Filmfare OTT Awards 2023: Full list out!". Filmfare.
2023	Filmfare OTT Awards	Best Actress – Comedy	Srishti Ganguli Rindani	Nominated	"Nominations for the Filmfare OTT Awards 2023: Full list out!". Filmfare.

== See also ==
- Taaza Khabar
- Dhindora
