= Zakir Khan (comedian) =

Indian comedian (born 1987)

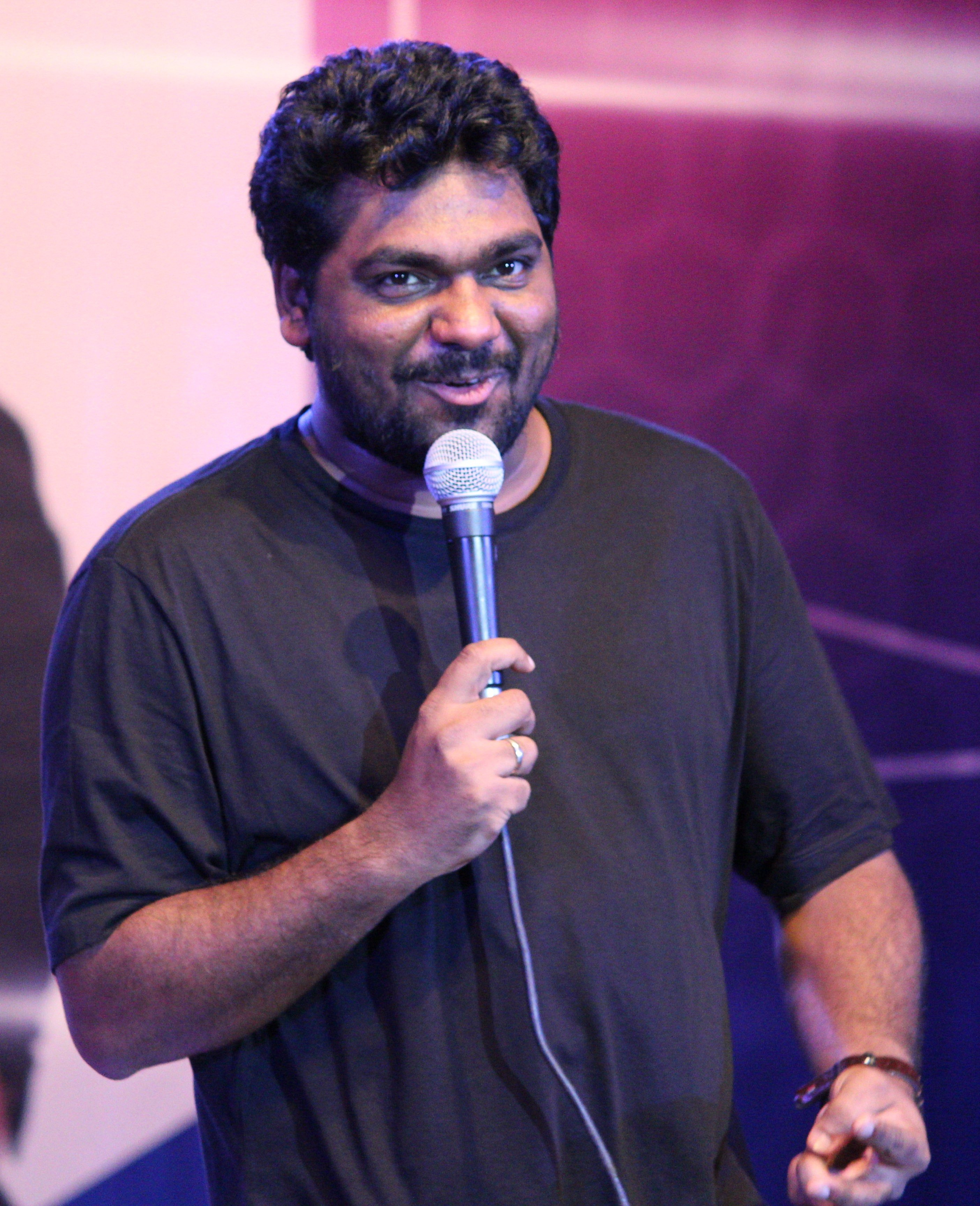
- Born: 20 August 1987 (age 39); Indore, Madhya Pradesh, India
- Education: St. Paul Higher Secondary School, Indore
- Occupation: Comedian
- Years active: 5 Jun 2009–present
- Known for: Haq Se Single; Chacha Vidhayak Hain Humare; Kaksha Gyarvi; Tathastu; Mannpasand; Delulu Express
- Relatives: Ustad Moinuddin Khan (grandfather)

YouTube information
- Channel: Zakir Khan
- Genre: Comedy
- Subscribers: 8.44 million
- Views: 908 million
- Last updated: 19 March 2026

Zakir Khan (born 20 August 1987) is an Indian comedian. He rose to popularity in 2012 after winning Comedy Central's comedy competition 'India's Best Stand Up'. Khan has also been a part of a news comedy show, On Air with AIB. He has released five hour-length standup specials: Haq Se Single (2017), Kaksha Gyarvi (2018), Tathastu (2022), Mannpasand (2023), and Delulu Express (2025) on Amazon Prime Video.

== Early life ==
Zakir Khan was born and raised in Indore, Madhya Pradesh to a Rajasthani Muslim family of classical musicians. He is the grandson of Sarangi Maestro Ustad Moinuddin Khan. He spent a large portion of his adult life in Delhi. He comes from a humble background and credits his father with being supportive of his talent.

== Career ==
Khan holds a diploma in Sitar and is a college dropout. He has stated that had he not been a standup comedian, he would instead be working as a music teacher. Khan gained recognition in India's stand-up comedy circuit in 2012 after winning India's Best Stand Up, a competition organized by Comedy Central. Besides performing at many stand-up comedy shows, he has also ghostwritten and produced radio shows. His comedy style was applauded in NDTV Prime's The Rising Stars of Comedy television show. Khan is known for his punchline "Sakht Launda", a humorous reference to a man with strong self-control who resists romantic advances. He has also performed with Joke Singh at Gurgaon.

Khan is an emerging Urdu Poet and comes from a family of artists. He has presented his poetry in events like Rekhta. On his train journey to Delhi, he wrote first poem, "Mai Soonya Pe Sawar Hoon". He also wrote "Apne Aap Ke Bhi Piche Khara Hoon Main", "Bus Ka Intezar Karte Huye".

In September 2017, Khan was one of the three mentors alongside Mallika Dua and Hussain Dalal for the fifth season of The Great Indian Laughter Challenge, judged by actor Akshay Kumar. Khan has over seven million subscribers on YouTube and is known for works like his Amazon Prime special Haq Se Single.

Khan wrote and starred in the Amazon Prime web series Chacha Vidhayak Hain Humare.

In 2015, Khan co-hosted and wrote On Air With AIB, a news comedy show, with Sorabh Pant and Gursimran Khamba from the Indian comedy group All India Bakchod. The show was broadcast on Star World, India. Khan co-hosted the 5th Annual Golden Kela Awards.

He also appeared as one of the judges in the second season of Amazon Prime's Comicstaan where he mentored the contestants in a genre of comedy known as anecdotal comedy. He also went on to be one of the four judges in third season.

Khan has also featured in the first season of Amazon Prime's One Mic Stand alongside Bhuvan Bam.

He has also begun his show called Farzi Mushaira which is available on Amazon mini TV.

Apart from comedy, Khan created and hosts the podcast series Ummeed on Gaana, where he shares life-inspired stories alongside fellow comedians.

In August 2025, Khan became the first Indian artist to perform a show entirely in Hindi at Madison Square Garden.

== Personal life ==
In January 2026, Khan announced an extended hiatus from live comedy performances, citing health concerns and personal reasons.

He stated that the break could last three to five years, potentially until 2030, with his final shows from the ongoing 'Papa Yaar' tour scheduled through June 2026.

== Work ==
=== Television ===
Year	Title	Role	Notes	Ref.
2017	The Great Indian Laughter Challenge	Mentor	Season 5	
2022	The Kapil Sharma Show	Self	Guest	
2023	Kaun Banega Crorepati	Guest	Season 15	
2024	Aapka Apna Zakir	Host		

=== Stand-up specials ===
Year	Title	Notes	Ref.
2017	Haq Se Single hai	Released on Follow	
2018	Kaksha Gyarvi	Released on Amazon Prime Video	
2022	Tathastu	Released on Amazon Prime Video	
2023	Mannpasand	Released on Amazon Prime Video	
2025	Delulu Express	Released on Amazon Prime Video	
2026	Papa Yaar	Released on Netflix	

=== Web series ===
Year	Title	Role	Notes	Ref.
2015	On Air With AIB	Himself	Season 2	
2016	Journey of a Joke	Himself	Season 1; Episode 1	
2016	Humorously Yours	Himself	Cameo	
2018	Chacha Vidhayak Hain Humare	Ronny Pathak	3 seasons	
2019	Comicstaan	Judge	Season 2	
2019	One Mic Stand	Himself	Season 1; Episode 1	
2021	Dhindora	Himself	Cameo	
2022	Farzi Mushaira	Host	Also writer	

== See also ==
- List of Indian comedians
- List of stand-up comedians
