= Nidhi (disambiguation) =

Nidhi is a treasure in Hindu mythology. Nidhi may also refer to

- Nidhi (given name)
- Nidhi (surname)
- Vidya Nidhi, Sri Lankan national honour awarded for scientific and technological achievements
- Nidhi company, a non-bank financial institution in India
