= Tanmay Bhat =

Indian stand-up comedian (born 1987)

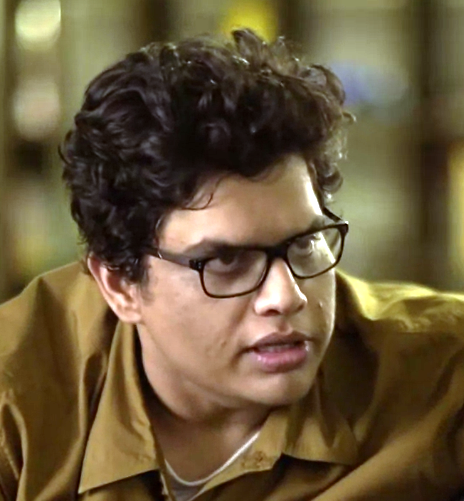
- Bhat in an AIB video
- Born: Tanmay Arun Bhat; 23 June 1990 (age 36); Bombay, Maharashtra, India
- Occupations: Writer; comedian; producer; YouTuber; scriptwriter
- Years active: 2006–present

YouTube information
- Channel: Tanmay Bhat
- Genres: Comedy; vlog; podcast; gaming; reactions
- Subscribers: 5.41 million
- Views: 2.58 billion
- Last updated: 16 July 2026

Tanmay Arun Bhat (born 23 June 1990) is an Indian YouTuber, comedian, scriptwriter, actor, performer and producer. He is the co-founder and former CEO/CFO of the creative agency All India Bakchod (AIB) along with Gursimran Khamba. In 2018, he was the judge on season 1 of Comicstaan, a stand-up comedy competition broadcast on Amazon Prime.

In mid-2019, he started the YouTube channel "Tanmay Bhat", where he posts vlogs, comedy sketches, reaction videos and video essays and streams games such as PUBG Mobile and Among Us. He has performed at many stand-up comedy shows and was also a part of Weirdass Comedy, founded by fellow comedian Vir Das.

== Early life ==
Tanmay Arun Bhat was born on 23 June 1990 in Bombay, to a Kannada Brahmin family, he did his schooling from Cosmopolitan Education Society and Sheth Chunilal Damodardas Barfiwala High School located in Andheri. He went on to pursue his higher education at the R. D. National College and Jai Hind College, where he completed his bachelor's degree in advertising. During his time at R. D. National College, he started Cutting Chai Fest, a student-led media festival.

== Career ==
=== Film and television ===
Tanmay Bhat made his debut with UTV Bindass' flagship show, Hass Ley India. He wrote for MTV India's Wassup and Nachle Ve with Saroj Khan. He ventured into story, screenplay and dialogue writing for Disney India's daily comedies Kya Mast Hai Life, The Suite Life of Karan & Kabir and NDTV Imagine's Oye! It's Friday! with Farhan Akhtar. He started doing stand-up comedy around the same time, and won Weirdass Ham-ateur Night in 2009, a national comic hunt organised by comedian Vir Das.

He was the writer and producer for India's More Talent, a subsidiary comedy show spawning from Not True, and has scripted TV award shows, including the Filmfare Awards, Star Parivaar Awards, Balaji Awards, Big TV Awards and Stardust Awards.

He had a brief cameo appearance in Ragini MMS 2 (2014) and appeared in Mr. X (2015).

Since 2024, he has appeared as a guest judge for various episodes on the comedy show, India's Got Latent.

=== All India Bakchod ===
All India Bakchod was co-founded as a YouTube channel in 2013 by Tanmay Bhat, Gursimran Khamba, Rohan Joshi and Ashish Shakya. They filmed sketches, performed stand-up comedy, and co-wrote shows as a comedy company. By early 2015, the comedy group had become a creative agency, making branded content for corporate clients. AIB's first foray into YouTube consisted of short spoofs and mimicry-based sketches. The song parodies continued to feature stereotypical situations and play on heavy nostalgia in their work. They popularized a satirical trope, "Honest Indian...", which they applied to various situations. Their podcast guests and work collaborators included various Bollywood celebrities, global and Indian comedians and filmmakers.

=== YouTube ===
Bhat returned to YouTube in November 2019, streaming PUBG: Battlegrounds. He also launched a second channel, Honestly by Tanmay Bhat, where he hosts 'learning streams' and videos featuring experts in various topics.

Bhat teamed up with YouTuber Saiman Says in January 2020 and brought in several comedians, including Sorabh Pant, CarryMinati, Kaneez Surka and Zakir Khan, for the "TreeMathon 2020" live stream. The stream was an 8-hour live session with people playing the game Getting Over It to support Mission Green Mumbai and raise funds to plant as many trees as possible in response to the deforestation drive at Aarey Forest.

In early April 2020, Bhat and Kaneez Surka hosted an 8-hour live stream for two days, raising over Rs 1.7 million for charities fighting the COVID-19 pandemic. Bhat moderated multiplayer online games with fellow comedians Rohan Joshi, Kaneez Surka, Bhuvan Bam, Anuvab Pal, Varun Grover and Kusha Kapila.

In 2020, Netflix India started a series with Bhat reacting to various movies & TV shows on Netflix, called Tanmay Reacts. Tanmay also reacts on the memes and videos on his own channel as part of the show, majorly with his "OG gang" - a group of four people with their own codenames - Aditya Kulshrestha (Writer OP), Nishant Tanwar (Rider OP), Rohan Joshi (Prisoner OP), Zakir Khan (Shayar OP), Vishal Dayama (Shauhar OP) and Piyush Sharma (Banker OP). He has had multiple guests on the series, including Vicky Kaushal, R. Madhavan, Kunal Kamra and Hanumankind.

=== Advertising ===
In 2016, Bhat appeared in an advertisement for Netflix, in which he impersonates Pablo Escobar. The 2-minute advertisement talks about Netflix addiction.

In 2020–2021, he co-wrote the scripts of several advertisements for the financial services company Cred, which featured actors and other celebrities including Shah Rukh Khan, Madhuri Dixit, Bappi Lahiri, Ravi Shastri, Anil Kapoor, Rahul Dravid, Kapil Dev and Neeraj Chopra.

== Controversies ==
In May 2016, Bhat uploaded a Snapchat video mimicking Sachin Tendulkar and Lata Mangeshkar, arguing about who was a better player. The video generated heated controversy over their portrayal, which some deemed offensive and appalling, while others found it hilarious and witty. Following this, an FIR was registered by the Maharashtra Navnirman Sena against him and Mumbai police wrote to Google and YouTube requesting the video be deleted.

In 2017, the comedian was booked and an FIR was filed against him for posting a meme of Indian Prime Minister Narendra Modi on Snapchat.

=== Me Too controversy ===
In October 2018, writer and comedian Mahima Kukreja accused the YouTuber Utsav Chakraborty, who worked as a freelancer with All India Bakchod, of sending her and other women lewd messages and photos via social messaging apps. At the time, Bhat was the CEO of AIB. Several comedians within Chakraborty's circle, including Tanmay Bhat, knew about the allegations of harassment but opted to keep quiet and work with him. On 8 October 2018, AIB announced that Bhat would immediately "be stepping away from his association with AIB" for the time being. Amazon Video removed Bhat from the panel of judges for the second season of Comicstaan due to the allegations.

In May 2019, AIB announced that Bhat was no longer suspended but removed from the CEO post. A few weeks later, Bhat stated in videos posted to Instagram that he suffered from clinical depression, drawing criticism from Mahima Kukreja and fellow comedian Aditi Mittal, both of whom accused Bhat of using depression as a good and characterised his claims as insincere.

== Filmography ==
Year	Title	Platform/Channel	Notes
2007–2008	Champion Chaalbaaz No.1	Sony Entertainment Television	Contestant
2009-2010	Kya Mast Hai Life	Disney India	Writer
2012–2018	Various AIB Videos	YouTube	Various Characters
2012-2013	The Suite Life of Karan & Kabir	Disney India	Writer
2014	Ragini MMS 2	Theatrical release; ALTBalaji	Cameo
2015–2018	On Air With AIB	Hotstar	Himself
2015	Mr. X	Theatrical release; Amazon Prime Video	Actor; Also producer
2015–2020	Son Of Abish	YouTube	Season 1 with Gursimran Khamba
2015–2020	Son Of Abish	YouTube	Season 2 with Vishal Dadlani
2015–2020	Son Of Abish	YouTube	Season 4 with Bhuvan Bam
2015–2020	Son Of Abish	YouTube	Season 7 with Kanan Gill
2015–2020	Son Of Abish	YouTube	Season 8 with Ahsaas Channa
2018	Comicstaan	Amazon Prime Video	Himself as judge
2020	Chintu Ka Birthday	ZEE5	Co-producer
2021	Dhindora	YouTube	Guest appearance in the title track music video
2021	Comedy Premium League	Netflix	Contestant
2022	Koffee with Karan 7	Disney Plus Hotstar	Himself
2024	Koffee with Karan 8	Disney Plus Hotstar	Himself
2024-2026	India's Got Latent	YouTube, Netflix	Guest judge for 4 episodes
2025	Kaun Banega Crorepati	Sony Entertainment Television	As a contestant with Samay Raina

== See also ==
- List of YouTubers
- List of Indian comedians
