= Rohan Joshi =

Indian stand-up comedian

- Born: Mumbai, India
- Education: K. J. Somaiya College of Engineering
- Occupations: Writer; comedian; YouTuber; television presenter
- Known for: All India Bakchod

Instagram information
- Page: mojorojo
- Followers: 794K (July 2026)

YouTube information
- Channel: Rohan Joshi
- Years active: 2018–present
- Subscribers: 197 thousand
- Views: 15.4 million
- Last updated: 1 May 2026

Rohan Joshi is a comedian and YouTuber. He was one of founding members of the creative agency All India Bakchod. Often considered as one of the best comedians in India, Joshi has scripted and starred in several YouTube sketches for All India Bakchod, and was one of the co-creators of the satirical news comedy show On Air With AIB. Now, he runs his own YouTube channel and makes reaction videos with Tanmay Bhat. He is also known to have worked as a teacher at Jai Hind College.

== Early and personal life ==
Joshi is of Gujarati and Maharashtrian descent. He attended K. J. Somaiya College of Engineering, but eventually dropped out. He attended Jai Hind College and subsequently worked as a journalist for a period of time. Before working for CNBC and Times Now, Joshi also attended Asian College of Journalism, Chennai, where he received his postgraduate diploma in broadcast journalism.

In 2014, he was reported to be dating Shaheen Bhatt. They broke up in 2017. Joshi is an atheist.

== Career ==
In the late 2000s, Joshi was a contributor to JLT, a humour magazine based in Mumbai. In addition to performing across India, Joshi served as a humour columnist for several publications including Mid-Day. In 2010, Joshi won Weirdass Ham-ateur Night, a national comic hunt organised by comedian Vir Das. In 2011, he performed at the Edinburgh Festival Fringe. In 2011 and 2012, he co-wrote the Filmfare Awards. In addition, he has performed in over 250 shows. Joshi spent a couple of years at Vir Das's comedy platform Weirdass, writing live comedy shows with Tanmay Bhat and Ashish Shakya. With Gursimran Khamba, they co-wrote television scripts and jokes for MTV, Channel V, and the Filmfare Awards. In 2013, Joshi was a frequent guest on the SoundCloud podcast All India Bakchod (AIB), which was started by Tanmay Bhat and Gursimran Khamba. Joshi scripted and starred in several YouTube sketches for the creative agency All India Bakchod, and was a co-creator of the satirical news comedy show On Air With AIB. Following controversy and sexual misconduct allegations against AIB members, the comedy company ceased operations in 2018.

In April 2019, Joshi confirmed that he was working on an hour-long stand-up comedy special for Amazon Prime Video. On 10 January 2020, Joshi's special Wake N' Bake was released on Amazon Prime Video. In the same year, Netflix India started a series with Tanmay Bhat reacting to various movies & TV shows on Netflix, called Tanmay Reacts. Bhat also reacts to memes and videos on his own channel as part of the show, and Joshi has been a part of the panel since 2020.

== Controversies ==
Joshi's tweet over comedian Raju Srivastav's death caused widespread outrage on X. He later deleted his tweet and issued a clarification.

== Filmography ==
Year	Title	Actor	Producer	Notes
2016	Baar Baar Dekho	Yes	No	
2017	Koffee with Karan	No	No	Special jury member in the fifth season finale
2020	Wake N' Bake	No	No	Comedy stand-up special
2020	Chintu Ka Birthday	No	Yes	Film released on ZEE5
2020	Mentalhood	Yes	No	Web series released on ALTT and ZEE5
2024-2026	India's Got Latent	No	No	Guest judge

== See also ==
- List of Indian comedians
- List of stand-up comedians
