= On Air With AIB =

Indian web television satire show

- Genre: Satire
- Created by: All India Bakchod
- Written by: AIB; Devaiah Bopanna; Siddharth Dudeja; Girish Narayandass; Madhavendra Singh; Karunesh Talwar; Abhishek Upamanyu; Shreyas Manohar; Vignesh Raja; Rohan Desai; Dhruv Deshpande; Adhiraj Singh
- Directed by: Ashwin Shetty; Arun Das; Nishant Nayak; Aniket Rao
- Presented by: Tanmay Bhat; Rohan Joshi; Gursimranjeet Singh Khamba; Ashish Shakya
- Theme music composer: StunnahSezBeatz
- Opening theme: Tragedy Main Comedy by Naezy
- Country of origin: India
- Original languages: Hindi; English
- No. of seasons: 3
- No. of episodes: 23

Production
- Executive producers: Kanika Unnikrishnan; Joel Pereira
- Producers: Achal Gupt; Vikram Singh; Vriti Patil; AIB
- Production location: Mumbai
- Cinematography: Apurva Sinnarkar; Sudhir Koushik
- Animators: Plexus; Nishant Jethva; Mihir Lele
- Camera setup: Multi-camera
- Running time: 22–30 minutes
- Production company: All India Bakchod

Original release
- Network: Hotstar
- Release: 29 October 2015 – 8 October 2018

On Air With AIB is an Indian satire television program created by All India Bakchod on Star India's digital platform Hotstar. It aired between 2015 and 2018. It was modeled after The Daily Show, SNL, and Last Week Tonight. The first season was replayed on StarPlus and Star World on the weekends. Seasons two and three were Hotstar digital exclusives, and shorter segments were uploaded on the AIB YouTube channel. The show was produced by Only Much Louder, a Mumbai-based entertainment company and AIB's former management, and was cancelled in its third season due to two separate instances of lack of redressal of sexual misconduct complaints by employees against collaborators, by the group's co-founders Tanmay Bhat and Gursimranjeet Singh Khamba. The opening theme "Tragedy Mein Comedy" (finding comedy in tragedy), is written, and performed, by Mumbai-based MC and producer Naezy. The track is produced by the production duo StunnahSezBeatz. All studio episodes were shot in Mumbai.

== Production ==
=== Pre-show ===
Prior to the show, AIB had established themselves as sketch comedy artists. Between 2012 and 2015, they uploaded numerous sketches—satirical, parody, spoof—and received popularity for It's Your Fault, a satirical take on Indian patriarchy. After facing public backlash for using insult comedy in their first large-scale production—a comedy central roast copy called AIB Knockout—the group did not upload anything on YouTube between 16 December 2014, and 11 April 2015. In order to regain goodwill, the first video they uploaded was a call to action sketch that urged viewers to fight for net neutrality in India. Around this time the group started hiring to begin per-production, and scripting, the show.

=== Announcement and release ===
On 14 September 2015, they uploaded the first On Air With AIB advertisement. In it fictional characters are seen congratulating the group on their copied roast, and fantasizing about a second one. It includes a skit of AIB spoofing their own roast. In a press release, the group said the show would "cover themes of national and local interest," and Bhat confirmed that they had been working on the show for the past "3-4 months." The show was taped in studio, in Mumbai. First at Filmalaya Private Limited, Andheri, and later at the space above The Habitat, Khar. S01E01 premiered on 29 October 2015. The first season ran for 20 episodes, second season ran 10 episodes, and the third season was cancelled after 3 episodes.

== Cancellation ==
Two separate cases of sexual misconduct allegations were leveled against AIB co-founders Tanmay Bhat, and Gursimranjeet Singh Khamba in the first week of October, 2018. Bhat was accused of being complicit in a sexual harassment case after he ignored complaints against a former employee, Utsav Chakraborty, and continued a professional relationship between him and AIB. Bhat later apologized on Twitter. In the second incident an unnamed woman accused Khamba of violating her consent, and emotional abuse. Khamba has denied these allegations. Hotstar cancelled the show on 8 October 2018.

== Episodes ==
=== Season 1 ===
The first season was divided into 10 episode sets of Hindi and English each. Bhat and Khamba anchored the Hindi episodes, while Joshi and Shakya anchored it in English. Critics called it "not particularly funny" and an "attempt at a news satire show along the lines of The Daily Show and its popular spin-off Last Week Tonight with John Oliver."

On Air With AIB: Season 1 - Episode List
Episode	English title	Hindi Title	Airing date	Network	Ref
1	Why Be Good?	Zabaan Sambhal Ke	29 October 2015	Hotstar	
2	Aag - The Fire		5 November 2015	Hotstar	
3	Cop Blocked	Dar ke Aage Police Hai	12 November 2015	Hotstar	
4	Space, The Final Frontier	Thoda Adjust Karo	19 November 2015	Hotstar	
5	HIV/AIDS - Red Ribbon Red Alert	Nazar Hatao Jan Gavaon	26 November 2015	Hotstar	
6	Monumental Screw Up	Purana Quila Nayi Vaat	3 December 2015	Hotstar	
7	Delhi Smelly	Kaat Kaleja Delhi	10 December 2015	Hotstar	
8	Ignorth East	Gharwale Baharwale	17 December 2015	Hotstar	
9	Get High on Your Own Supply	Aakhri Nasha	24 December 2015	Hotstar	
10	Sex and the CSE	Phool aur Kante	31 December 2015	Hotstar	

=== Season 2 ===
They changed the format by creating shorter segments, inviting guests, introducing a podcast style segment, and making it multilingual. It was 10 episodes long, and uploaded as shorter segments online. The premier was described by Film Companion as "underwhelming at best." Many frequent collaborators such as comedians Abish Matthew, Kanan Gill, Biswa Kalyan Rath, Rahul Subramaniam, Kenny Sebastian, Varun Thakur, Neville Shah, Kaneez Surka, Sumukhi Suresh, Zakir Khan, Anuvab Pal, Azeem Banatwala, Malika Dua and Varun Grover were the guest interviews.

On Air With AIB: Season 2 - Episode List
Episode	Title	Airing date	Network	Ref
1	Nationalism Vs Anti-Nationalism	6 March 2017	Hotstar	
2	Purani Jeans Purani Soch	13 March 2017	Hotstar	
3	Broad Bandh	20 March 2017	Hotstar	
4	Fake News	27 March 2017	Hotstar	
5	Domestic Disturbance	3 April 2017	Hotstar	
6	Aadhar ya Na-dhaar	10 April 2017	Hotstar	
7	Mental Health	17 April 2017	Hotstar	
8	Puppy Love	24 April 2017	Hotstar	
9	Unhappy Hours	1 May 2017	Hotstar	
10	No Coverage Area	8 May 2017	Hotstar	

=== Season 3 ===
The third season largely followed the same format as season two. Guests on this season included BuzzFeed India employee Srishti Dixit, former Buzzfeed India employee Rega Jha, comedian Rahul Subramaniam, and comedian Urooj Ashfaq. Critics said the third season "gets lazy with stale jokes" and it was subsequently cancelled by Hotstar after three episodes because of two separate sexual misconduct allegations against Bhat's complicity within AIB, and Khamba.

On Air With AIB: Season 3 - Episode List
Episode	Title	Airing date	Network	Ref
1	Petrolololol	24 September 2018	Hotstar	
2	Iss Cheez Pe Nai Bolne Ka	1 October 2018	Hotstar	
3	Indian Travellers	8 October 2018	Hotstar	

== See also ==
- The Week That Wasn't
- Fake or Not
