= Moinuddin Khan =

Moinuddin Khan may refer to:

- Moinuddin Khan (musician), Indian classical instrumentalist and vocalist
- Moinuddin Khan (footballer) (born 1997), Indian footballer
