= Round2hell =

Indian YouTube channel

- Other name: R2H
- Occupations: YouTubers; actors

YouTube information
- Channel: Round2hell
- Years active: 20 Oct 2016–present
- Genres: Comedy; science fiction
- Subscribers: 36.3 million
- Views: 3.80 billion
- Last updated: January 2026

Round2hell (styled as R2H) is an Indian YouTube channel and comedy group from Moradabad, Uttar Pradesh, consisting of Zayn Saifi, Nazim Ahmed, and Wasim Ahmad. Launched in October 2016, the trio is known for sketch comedy, short films and science fiction content often exploring themes of friendship, family, and societal quirks. With over 35 million subscribers by 2025, Round2hell is among India's most popular YouTube channels, recognised for videos like Aladdin and Zombie: The Living Dead, the latter named YouTube's most trending video of 2021. The group won the Reel Star Sketch Comedy Creator of the Year at Creators United 2023.

Their other channel Round2hell Vlog is dedicated to vlogs and travel-related content. They are widely considered among the most popular and highest-paid YouTubers in India.

== History ==
Round2hell was launched on 20 October 2016, by childhood friends Zayn Saifi, Nazim Ahmed, and Wasim Ahmad, all from Moradabad.

Initially, they posted football montage videos, which received limited attention (120 views). Shift to comedy sketches in 2017, particularly Jio Users After 31st March, went viral due to its commentary on Reliance Jio's free data offer ending, marking their rise to fame.

The channel name ROUND2HELL originated from a drifting incident Saifi likened to a "round to hell". Their early earnings were donated to charity, and despite initial parental scepticism, their success led to family support.

By 2025, the channel surpassed 35 million subscribers, with videos like Aladdin and Mauka Mauka India vs Pakistan exceeding 100 million views.

== Content and style ==
Round2hell produces Hindi-language comedy sketches, short films, and science fiction content, featuring exaggerated characters and relatable scenarios drawn from Indian daily life.

Themes include friendship, romance, and societal issues, delivered with slapstick humor and witty dialogue. Notable works include Zombie: The Living Dead (2021, YouTube's most trending video), Age of Water (2022, IMDb 9.1 rating), and The Parallel World (2019, web series).

Their secondary channel, Round2hell Vlog, focuses on travel and personal updates. The group collaborates with actors like Mehtab Saifi and Talib Saifi but maintains the trio as core members.

== Collaborations ==
They have been invited to events like YouTube FanFest (2019) in Delhi.

In 2019, Round2hell collaborated with Bhuvan Bam of BB Ki Vines for the music video of the Dhindora title track, sung by Kailash Kher.

In 2023, they collaborated with Netflix India for a promotional video, Is Time Travel Possible? and received the Sketch Comedy Creator of the Year award at Creators United 2023.

In 2024, they joined CarryMinati, MrBeast, and 12 other prominent YouTubers in India's largest YouTube collaboration, a MrBeast parody video.

== Filmography ==
=== Series ===
List of series credits
Year	Title	Season(s)	Ref.
2020	EPL	Season 1	
2022	EPL	Season 2	
2024	EPL	Season 3	
2025	EPL	Season 4	

=== Short films ===
List of short film credits
Year	Title	Ref.
2021	1959	
2021	Zombie the Living Dead	
2022	Age of Water	
2023	AADI MANAV	
2023	Men on Mission	

=== Music videos ===
Year	Title	Singer(s)	Lyricist(s)	Ref.
2019	Dhindora (title track)	Kailash Kher	Bhuvan Bam	

== Recognition ==
Round2hell has been listed among India's most popular, richest and highest-paid YouTubers by Dainik Jagran, Chegg India, and DNA India. Their Zombie: The Living Dead was YouTube's most trending video of 2021. In 2023, they won the Reel Star Sketch Comedy Creator of the Year at Creators United, hosted by Netflix India.

They received YouTube's Silver, Gold, and Diamond Play Buttons for subscriber milestones (100k, 1M, 10M). Their participation in YouTube Fanfest Delhi (2019) was described as a "dream come true".

Several of their videos, including Aladdin and Mauka Mauka India vs Pakistan, have exceeded 100 million views.

In 2021, YouTube announced that Zombie: The Living Dead, a 40-minute horror-comedy film by Round2Hell, was the most trending video of 2021. Additionally, they were also named as one of the top content creators of that year.
