= It's Your Fault =

It's Your Fault may refer to:

- It's Your Fault (video), 2013 satirical video
- It's Your Fault (film), Argentine film
