= Shriyans Bhandari =

Indian entrepreneur

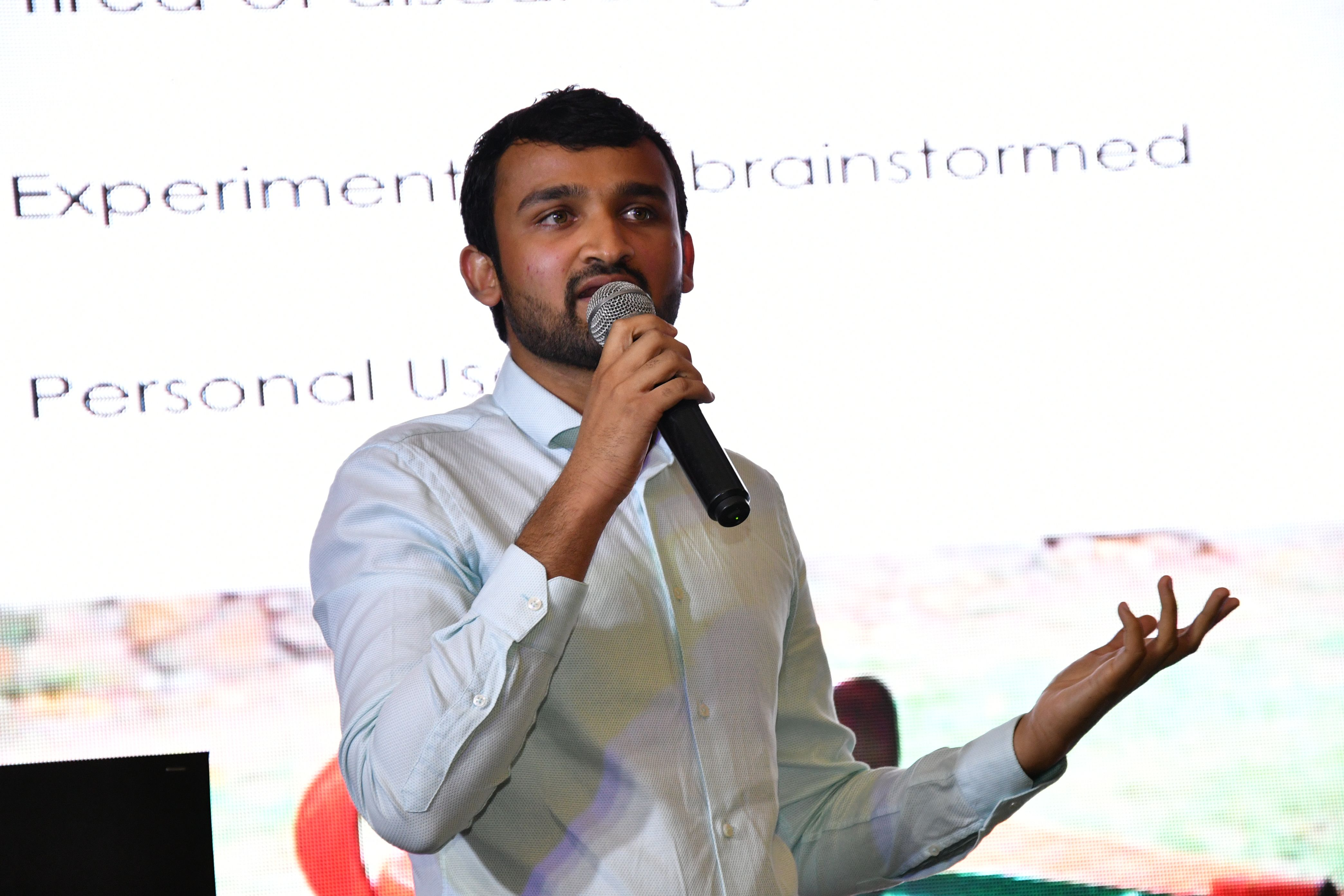
- Shriyans speaking at Patrika event Surat in 2017
- Born: Udaipur, Rajasthan
- Education: Mayo College; Jai Hind College; Babson College

Shriyans Bhandari is an Indian social entrepreneur, author and co-founder of Greensole.

== Education and career ==
Shriyans completed his schooling from St. Paul's Senior Secondary School, Udaipur, and high school from Mayo College Ajmer. He has done Bachelor of Management studies in finance from Jai Hind College Mumbai and MSM Entrepreneurial Leadership from Babson College Franklin W Olin.

Shriyans is an ardent marathon runner who ran in 85 long-distance races. He started as athletes from Mumbai and run hundreds of kilometers each year and in the process, he went through several pairs of sports shoes. He noticed wasted sneakers that had no future life, just increasing the pollution. This passion gave him a unique business idea of recycling the used shoes. In 2015 Shriyans and his friend Ramesh Dhami decided to recycle old footwear and founded Greensole.

He is the director and board member of Heritage Girls School.

Bhandari is also a TedX speaker. He spoke in TEDxYouth@WASO which was an independently organized TEDx event held in Wellington Academy, Dubai Silicon Oasis in April 2016.

== Philanthropy ==
Shriyans started his journey as a philanthropist in 2015. He has donated lacs of pairs of slippers to poor children. His start-up Greensole, recycles the used shoes and mold them in to new slippers.

He has also set up a skill center in Jharkhand with Tata Steel, to train tribal women in recycling old footwear.

== Books ==
- "Birds of Aravallis" in association with Rajasthan Tourism and Bombay Natural History Society.
- "Lessons of a Curious Sole" with Ms Somma Banerjjee and Vital20 Communications. ISBN 978-93-5416-795-9, p;100

== Awards and honors ==
- Forbes 30 Under 30 Asia
- IAN Global Startup Finalists 2018
- Inspirational Young Entrepreneur of India
