= All India Bakchod =

Indian creative agency

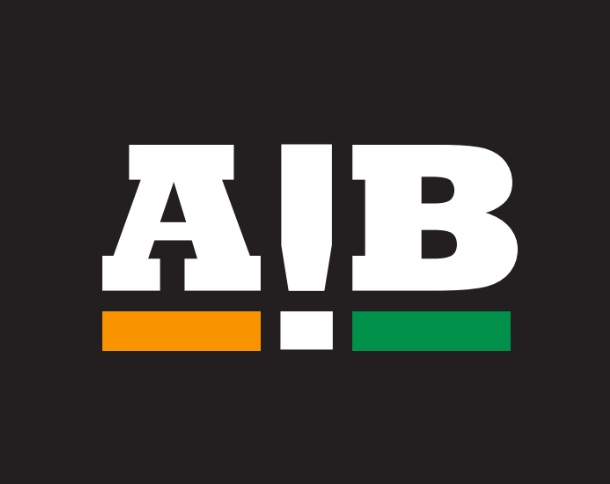
- Other name: AIB

YouTube information
- Channel: AllIndiaBakchod
- Genres: Branded content; Parody; Satire
- Subscribers: 3.98 million (July 2026)
- Views: 674.0 million (July 2026)
- Last updated: 21 July 2026

All India Bakchod (Note: bakchod is a profane slang which roughly means 'nonsensical' or 'bullshit') (abbreviated as AIB) was a Mumbai-based comedy company which created an eponymous podcast, YouTube channel and ran a production company. The name is a parody of All India Radio. It began in 2012 as a humour/pop-culture podcast co-started by comedians Tanmay Bhat and Gursimran Khamba. Their friends and contemporary comedians, Rohan Joshi and Ashish Shakya were frequent guests and the four co-founded the YouTube channel in 2013 and began making sketches. They subsequently formed a digital agency and produced sketches, live comedy and TV shows.

In October 2018, the company halted operation and fired its entire staff, after Bhat and Khamba were implicated in two separate sexual harassment allegations. No formal charges were made but the company dissolved in May 2019. Khamba was dissatisfied with the independent investigation into the allegation against him and has since disassociated himself from the company and brand. The company's four founders continue to work in the comedy circuit. Bhat, Joshi and Shakya continue to collaborate independently. The company's social media accounts and YouTube channel are dormant.

== History ==
=== Background ===
Tanmay Bhat, Rohan Joshi and Ashish Shakya entered the Mumbai stand-up comedy circuit around 2008. The three frequently performed at an influential open mic show called Weirdass Ham-ateur Night while Joshi and Bhat also worked with Vir Das's Weirdass Comedy company on award show (Filmfare, MTV and Channel V) scripts. Joshi and Bhat performed improv with Das, Kavi Shastri, Ashwin Mushran and Anu Menon as The Cardinal Bengans. Bhat also wrote for Hindi TV and alongside Joshi contributed to JLT (a.k.a. Just Like That), a weekly youth-focused magazine published by The Times of India. Joshi briefly worked for CNBC and wrote a humour column for Mid-Day. Besides stand-up Shakya wrote a humour column for Hindustan Times and wrote for satirical show called The Week That Wasn't and MTV India's Wassup: The Voice of Youngistaan.

Gursimran Khamba is a Delhi-based humour blogger who had gained popularity with political commentary, satirical essays and film reviews. He had also contributed to satirical newsmagazine Faking News. In 2011, he moved to Mumbai to attend graduate school at Tata Institute of Social Sciences (TISS) and soon transitioned to stand-up and podcasting. Bhat approached Khamba after seeing him perform stand-up, and in 2012, they began the humour and pop-culture SoundCloud podcast All India Bakchod. Initial podcast topics included discussions on pop-culture, parody songs and interviews with contemporary comedians. Joshi and Shakya were frequent guests, first appearing in the third episode.

=== Formation ===
When performing or working as a quartet, the four comedians were commonly referred to as AIB. They co-founded the YouTube channel for All India Bakchod in 2013 and began writing sketches. They subsequently formed AIB as a comedy company which filmed videos, performed stand-up comedy and co-wrote shows. By early 2015, the comedy group became a creative agency, making branded content for corporate clients.

== Selected works ==
=== Sketches and spoofs ===
AIB started uploading sketches to YouTube in February 2013. Their first series, AIB 365, used mimicry and other comedic devices. In April 2013, they created a spoof of Bollywood award shows, Royal Turds and performed it live for over a year. In September 2013, their sketch It's Your Fault, which was a collaboration with actress Kalki Koechlin. It was a satirical take on the Indian patriarchal mindset of victim blaming. They further collaborated with actor Imran Khan for the video Imran Khan Answers Questions About Being Gay & Sec 377, to extend their support for the LGBTQ community. One of their most successful videos was Genius of the Year, the title being a play on the film Student of the Year, starring actress Alia Bhatt, dealing with the backlash of her Koffee with Karan appearance in a humorous way. During this period, comics Karunesh Talwar and Abish Matthew were frequent collaborators.

In December 2014, they performed and filmed the All India Bakchod Knockout (a celebrity roast) at the Sardar Vallabhbhai Patel Indoor Stadium in Worli. Karan Johar was the host with roasters AIB, Rajeev Masand, Raghu Ram, Aditi Mittal and Abish Matthew. Ranveer Singh and Arjun Kapoor were roasted. The show was uploaded on YouTube, but was subsequently removed from its channel because of widespread public backlash. AIB apologized and explained their decision:

First things first; no one person or force forced us to take this video down. This is not something that's happening because of a 3 am phone call or morcha [protest] at our front door or a gunman on a grassy knoll. Under the circumstances, this is us being pragmatic.

Along with protests of certain Christian and Hindu organisations, several FIRs were lodged against those involved with the show. A Mumbai-based law teacher Sharmila Ghuge has also filed a PIL before Bombay High Court seeking action against AIB. Multiple Bollywood celebrities expressed both their dissatisfaction at the content and positive support in favour of artistic freedom.

=== Calls to action ===
Facing public backlash due to Knockout, AIB ceased uploading content until 11 April 2015, when they released a call to action video which urged viewers to email their Member of parliament to support net neutrality. In February 2017, they made a video asking people to vote in the BMC Mumbai elections.

=== Branded content, web series and film ===
By May 2015, AIB had transitioned into a creative agency and started an advertisement division called Vigyapanti. Between 2015 and 2018 they hired and contracted multiple writers to work on branded content. During this period, the four original members, with a writing team, created a satirical web television show called On Air With AIB, produced by Only Much Louder. This show ran on Disney+ Hotstar for three seasons, with some shorter segments uploaded on the AIB YouTube channel along with branded content. In 2016, they launched film-making workshop First Draft. By September 2018, they had 40 employees working as writers and producers.

In December 2016, a report stated that AIB was producing Amazon Prime Video's first Indian original fiction show, Ministry, starring Irrfan Khan. In October 2017, it was reported that Khan would play a washed-up Bollywood actor seeking to regain the love of the masses while appointed as a placeholder culture minister. In August 2018, Irrfan left the project due to a health issue, and the show was renamed to Gormint, a pronunciation from a viral video of an elderly woman criticizing the government. Manav Kaul, reportedly was cast in the lead role after Irrfan's departure. In November 2018, Khamba was fired as the showrunner after allegations of sexual misconduct against him surfaced. In May 2019, Khamba uploaded a photograph of the end of filming. The project has since been shelved. Chintu Ka Birthday was AIB's first self-financed film. It was released after the company's dissolution and the individual co-founders are listed as producers. It was co-directed by frequent collaborators Devanshu Kumar and Satyanshu Singh, and starred Vinay Pathak and Tillotama Shome. The film was released on ZEE5 on 5 June 2020.

=== Themes ===
Parodies featured in AIB's works from their initial podcast, exaggerating the songs like Baba Sehgal's "Praji Kunjam Kunjam Control" ("Paaji Fuck All Control [The Pro Boy Feticide Song]"), and John Lennon's "Imagine" ("Imagine There's No Channel"). AIB's first foray into YouTube consisted of short spoofs and mimicry-based sketches. Song parodies continued to feature in their work, along with stereotypical situations and plays on heavy nostalgia. One of their most notable song parodies is Every Bollywood Party Song, featuring Irrfan Khan, which parodies Yo Yo Honey Singh's "Party All Night". They popularized a satirical trope, "Honest Indian...", which they applied to various situations.

The majority of their sketches were branded content and included promotions for AskMe Snapdeal, Furlenco, Swiggy, Bacardi, TrulyMadly, Google Allo and OnePlus. Their podcast guests and work collaborators, included numerous Bollywood celebrities, global and Indian comedians and filmmakers.

== Criticism ==
"This just leads you to think that the weakness is a bit of front."

— Krupa Gohil

AIB's progressive outlook was appreciated as well as criticized for reproducing "the very models of patriarchy it seeks out to address". In February 2017, within a week of being hired as a social-media writer, 22-year-old Krupa Gohil felt, "the company in general and the four founders in particular, saw the internet's emerging conversation about feminism as just another meme-worthy narrative to tap into." Gohil said: "[an employee] made a meme about smashing patriarchy but he didn't even know what patriarchy meant. It was just made and shared on social media to score woke points. These were empty, token actions." Another writer, Nisha Kalra, however, felt supported and looked out for by the team, when a similar incident happened with her. She said that in July 2017, when she was working with AIB as a writer on a contract, a male employee dropped his trousers and underpants and exposed his penis. This incident was repeated by the man, for three days and when he exposed his penis in her presence, thrice in a single day, Kalra decided to confront the person, who said his "pants were loose". After she filed a formal complaint, the man was fired after an inquiry and overall she was very grateful for how the situation was handled.

In early 2018, contemporary comics called out the group on their unidimensional portrayal of female characters who had no agency in their work. Characters in their sketches, podcast guests and their collaborators skewed towards being almost entirely male. The group addressed the issue and said they'd "work harder to create content that's inclusive." Since 2017, they have deleted material that has drawn criticism, including videos that Utsav Chakraborty had worked on.

== Allegations of sexual misconduct ==
=== Against Utsav Chakraborty ===
"When I told him about Utsav Chakraborty, I was expecting that he [would] do something, take some action... I was let down by him."

— Mahima Kukreja, Ozy

On 4 October 2018, comedian and actor Utsav Chakraborty, a former editor at Huffington Post India, former AIB employee and frequent collaborator, was accused of impropriety. The allegations against Chakraborty garnered attention when poet Mahima Kukreja accused him of sending her an unsolicited explicit image. Before publicly denouncing Chakraborty on Twitter, Kukreja had previously told Bhat about Chakraborty's behaviour. Bhat confronted Chakraborty, took no action and continued a professional working relationship between Chakraborty and AIB. This incident was the genesis of the MeToo movement in India in 2018.

One year later, Chakraborty made public statements alleging that Bhat did not act as he said previously and that Chakraborty was "thrown under the bus" in an attempt to save the company and called the allegations "fabricated".

In a series of Instagram videos, Bhat issued an update on his professional and personal life. He said he was diagnosed with clinical depression at the end of 2018, while the company was being shut down. He said he felt "mentally checked out" and "paralyzed and unable to participate socially, online or even offline". His statement drew both support and criticism from former colleagues and contemporaries.

=== Against Gursimran Khamba ===
"Khamba tried to repeatedly make out with me while we were hanging out. He lay down on top of me on the couch, I had to physically shove him away, turn my face or push his. He would then stop. And we would hang out, ignoring the entire thing. I continued being friends with him."

— Hindustan Times

On 8 October 2018, Khamba was accused of violating consent and emotional abuse by an unknown woman. She said they had "hooked up two-three times" and continued being friends. She added that Khamba drunk called her and threatened to ruin their friendship and emotionally blackmailed her for five months. Khamba acknowledged to a certain degree of misbehaviour but has rejected the suggestion that he violated her consent.

Regarding the statement, Khamba said the allegation was made by a person who shared a "deep personal relationship" with him. He said that an independent committee looked into the allegation for four months and was "replete with procedural lapses and did not follow principals of natural justice". He withdrew from the company because of this. He founded a new digital content company called Light@27.

=== Effects ===
As a result of these allegations, Bhat was asked to step away from the company and Khamba was put on indefinite leave. Both were fired from their roles as judges on the talent show Comicstaan and other Amazon projects. Khamba was fired from his position as showrunner on Gormint. The company's web television show On Air With AIB was canceled. Chintu Ka Birthday, an AIB produced film, was dropped from the 2018 MAMI Mumbai Film Festival and its Netflix release was cancelled.

== Dissolution ==
On 8 October 2018, Khamba and Bhat were asked to leave AIB due to their involvement and complicit behaviour in separate sexual harassment allegations. Subsequently, Bhat was asked to step away from the company and Khamba was put on indefinite leave. The two were also fired from various roles they individually held on other shows. The company's web television show was cancelled entirely by its network, Disney+ Hotstar, mid-season. In October 2018, the company was temporarily shut down and was steering towards permanent closure. In May 2019, they issued a statement that confirmed that their entire staff was let go, that Bhat's suspension was lifted (but he would not be allowed to return as CEO) and that Khamba had cut all ties with the company. Bhat, Joshi and Shakya have since re-entered the comedy circuit and continue to be associated with the company's name. Khamba, dissatisfied with an independent inquiry into the allegation against him, decided to leave the company and start another comedic venture.

At the time of dissolution, Bhat, Joshi, Shakya and Khamba each owned 25 per cent of the company. As of March 2018, the company collectively owed the founders just over $51,000 from loans. In May 2019, AIB announced that their YouTube channel was dead for the foreseeable future. On 26 and 27 May 2020, they broke their silence on Instagram and Twitter respectively to announce the world satellite premiere of Chintu Ka Birthday. The trailer of the film was uploaded to AIB's YouTube channel on 29 May 2020.

== See also ==
- East India Comedy
- The Viral Fever
