= All India Bakchod Knockout =

AIB Knockout
- All India Bakchod Knockout promo poster
- Based on: The Dean Martin Celebrity Roast; Comedy Central Roast
- Produced by: Only Much Louder
- Starring: AIB; Ranveer Singh; Arjun Kapoor; Karan Johar; Aditi Mittal; Raghu Ram; Rajeev Masand; Abish Mathew
- Distributed by: YouTube
- Release date: 28 January 2015
- Running time: 54:00
- Country: India
- Languages: Hindi and English

The All India Bakchod Knockout, a.k.a. AIB Knockout was a celebrity roast adaptation created by Mumbai based creative agency All India Bakchod (AIB). It was performed and filmed in December, 2014, and an edited version was uploaded on their YouTube channel on January 28, 2015. It was recorded at the NSCI Dome in Worli. It was hosted by Karan Johar, Ranveer Singh and Arjun Kapoor were roasted. AIB claimed that it became the most shared video under 24 hours in India. The show was subsequently removed from their channel on February 3, 2015. AIB removed the show because it attracted widespread public backlash from religious groups, Bollywood actors, and certain right-wing political activists.

== Cast ==
Panelist	Role	Profession
Karan Johar	Host	Filmmaker
Ranveer Singh	Roastees	Actor
Arjun Kapoor	Roastees	Actor
Tanmay Bhat	Roasters	Co-founder — AIB
Gursimran Khamba	Roasters	Co-founder — AIB
Rohan Joshi	Roasters	Co-founder — AIB
Ashish Shakya	Roasters	Co-founder — AIB
Abish Mathew	Roasters	Radio jockey/comedian/actor
Raghu Ram	Roasters	Actor/reality TV judge
Aditi Mittal	Roasters	Comedian/writer
Rajeev Masand	Roasters	Film critic

== Reception ==
In February, 2015, the show was subject to widespread public criticism and certain right-wing political leaders filed an FIR against the group, the participants and certain audience members, under multiple sections of the Indian Penal Code. No progress or arrests were made in any of the cases. Some dissenters protested outside AIB's office displaying their displeasure at the show's content. AIB offered apologies to those who were aggrieved and issued a two page press-release explaining their decision to remove the video from their channel.

First things first; no one person or force forced us to take this video down. This is not something that's happening because of a 3 am phone call or morcha (protest) at our front door or a gunman on a grassy knoll. Under the circumstances, this is us being pragmatic. Allow us to explain.

— NDTV

Multiple Bollywood celebrities expressed both their displeasure at the content and positive support in favor of artistic freedom. The hype surrounding the show eventually ended by April, 2015, and to work on their goodwill, AIB's next YouTube upload was a call to action sketch that urged people to fight for Net Neutrality in India.
