= Chintu Ka Birthday =

- Promotional poster
- Directed by: Devanshu Singh; Satyanshu Singh
- Written by: Devanshu Singh; Satyanshu Singh
- Produced by: Tanmay Bhat; Rohan Joshi; Ashish Shakya; Gursimran Khamba
- Starring: Vinay Pathak; Tillotama Shome; Seema Pahwa; Bisha Chaturvedi; Vedant Chibber; Reginald L. Barnes; Nate Scholz
- Cinematography: Siddharth Diwan
- Edited by: Charu Shree Roy
- Music by: Naren Chandavarkar; Benedict Taylor
- Production company: First Draft Entertainment
- Distributed by: ZEE5
- Release dates: 14 September 2019 (JFF); 5 June 2020
- Running time: 83 minutes
- Country: India
- Language: Hindi

Chintu Ka Birthday is an Indian Hindi-language comedy drama film written and directed by Devanshu Singh and Satyanshu Singh. It is produced by comedians Tanmay Bhat, Rohan Joshi, Ashish Shakya and Gursimran Khamba of All India Bakchod under their banner First Draft. Starring Vinay Pathak, Tillotama Shome, Seema Pahwa and Vedant Chibber, the film tells the story of a 6 year old boy named Chintu, stuck in Iraq with his family during Saddam’s fall in April 2004.

The film was screened at the 2019 Jagran Film Festival and was supposed to be screened at the 2018 MAMI Film Festival but was dropped out of it after a sexual harassment aiding complaint during the me too movement. Chintu Ka Birthday was released on ZEE5 on 5 June 2020.

== Plot ==
The film tells the story of 6-year-old boy named Chintu, stuck in Iraq with family at the times of Saddam’s fall. It is April 2004. US-led allied forces have been in Iraq for a year now. All Indians have been brought home, or so says the Indian government. But there are those who migrated to Iraq illegally, still waiting to find a way out. On the day of this story, one such family prepares to celebrate the 6th birthday of their youngest member, Chintu. Their kind-hearted Iraqi landlord Mehdi lends them a helping hand.

They have to deal with a lot of issues; they don't find a cake, the old cranky oven doesn't work, issues with decoration, gifts, etc. However, the family has resolved to celebrate his birthday come what may. Waheed, a school friend of Chintu, smuggles drugs & CDs for American soldier and also Jihadi material. He had earlier given Chintu some of his CDs of Jihadi material as well which his parents don't approve of.

Suddenly there is a bomb blast and Mehdi is scared and starts looking out of the house desperately. He requests Chintu's family to hide him, which they approve and he hides in the storeroom. Later, two American soldiers, Louis and Reed enter their home to search for the suspects of the bomb blast. Louis is experienced, while Reed has recently arrived at Iraq. Chintu's father Madan, acts normal and calms the situation. The soldiers are satisfied and about to leave when Mehdi screams because of the rats in the storeroom. The soldier quickly pulls him out and detain both of them. The situation suddenly becomes tense. The soldiers request a convoy to take the detainees, but they are informed that the coast is not clear for the convoy. Later, Waheed and a girl arrive for the birthday party. It turns out that Waheed knows Louis and there is an exchange of banter. Mehdi takes advantage of this distraction & escapes from there. Louis chases him, while Reed stays put. Later the radio contact is lost between the two.

Meanwhile, because of this chaos, they forget about the cake and it gets charred in the oven. The family is almost in tears to see the cake however, Madan gives them hope and requests his wife Sudha to make another cake with whatever they have. Sudha then starts making a cake out of cookies.

Later, Chintu recalls about the Jihadi CDs Waheed had given him and attempts to hide them before Reed discovers it. However, Reed catches him and gets furious. He thinks that the entire family is aiding terrorists and starts thrashing Madan. Louis arrives and tries to calm down Reed. He tells Madan not to hide anything from them for the sake of his family. Here, Reed tears down the whole house for any more evidence but, he is left more furious because he is not able to find anything. Louis guesses that Waheed is the culprit by the look on his face but, he waits for Madan to say something. Later Madan gets a call from his father & broken down when his father tells him that despite meeting a very senior politician his efforts to evacuate them from Iraq turned futile.

After sometime when things are calm, he strikes a conversation with the soldiers. He tells them that he understands that they are not bad people and are just doing their job, but they should give them 10 minutes to celebrate the birthday and he would calmly come with them. Louis dissuades Madan from becoming a sacrificial lamb and urges him to tell them the truth but Madan still refuses. Both of them finally agree for the birthday party and the family starts gearing up for the cake cutting ceremony. Madan receives a call from Mehdi who warns him not to go with the American soldiers because he would never be able to return but, Madan is unwavering.

Chintu's family celebrates a very emotional birthday, while Reed reflects deeply on his actions. As they are about to leave, Reed drops the plan of taking Madan with them and both of them leave. Waheed apologizes to Madan and he quickly forgives him.

== Cast ==
- Vinay Pathak as Madan Tiwary
- Tillotama Shome as Sudha Tiwary
- Seema Pahwa as Nani, Sudha's mother
- Vedant Chibber as Chintu, son of Madan & Sudha Tiwary
- Bisha Chaturvedi as Lakshmi, daughter of Madan & Sudha Tiwary
- Khalid Massou as Mahdi, Iraqi Landlord of Tiwary's
- Nate Scholz as Darren Reed, American Soldier
- Reginald L Barnes as Louis Jackson, American Soldier
- Mehroos Ahmad Mir as Waheed, Iraqi classmate of Chintu
- Amina Afroz as Zainab, Iraqi classmate of Chintu
- Sanjay Mishra as Chintu's Grandfather (Voice only)
- Sheela Srivastava as Chintu's Grandmother (Voice only)

== Awards and nominations ==
Award	Category	Recipient(s)	Result	Ref(s)
Filmfare OTT Awards	Best Web Original Film	ZEE5	Nominated	
Filmfare OTT Awards	Best Actor (Male)	Vinay Pathak	Nominated	
Filmfare OTT Awards	Best Supporting Actor (Female)	Seema Pahwa	Won	
