= Nidhi (given name) =

Nidhi is a Sanskrit feminine given name and a Thai masculine given name that may refer to the following notable people:

- Nidhhi Agerwal, Indian actress and dancer
- Nidhi Bisht (born 1985), Indian casting director filmmaker, lawyer, actress and writer
- Nidhi Buley (born 1986), Indian cricketer
- Nidhi Chanani (born 1980), Indian-American freelance illustrator and artist
- Nidhi Eoseewong (born 1940), Thai historian, writer, and political commentator
- Nidhi Goyal (born 1985), Indian disability and gender rights activist
- Nidhi Jha, Indian actress
- Nidhi Razdan (born 1977), Indian journalist, television personality and journalist
- Nidhi Subbaiah (born 1987), Indian film actress and model
- Nidhi Sunil (born 1987), Indian model and actress, and philanthropist
- Nidhi Uttam, Indian television and film actress
- Nidhi Yasha (born 1983), Indian costume designer
