= Fake or Not =

2020 Indian quiz show

- Genre: Quiz show
- Inspired by: 'Share Verified' by United Nations
- Presented by: Inder Sahani
- Country of origin: India
- Original language: Hindi
- No. of seasons: 1

Production
- Production location: India
- Running time: 10 minutes
- Production company: The Blue Magic Films

Original release
- Release: 6 July – 22 December 2020

Fake or Not? is a 2020 Indian web show currently hosted by stand-up comedian and YouTuber Inder Sahani. The show is a Flipkart Video original and was launched on Flipkart App on 6 July 2020. Fake or Not is inspired by the United Nations 'Share Verified' campaign and aims to separate real news from fake news. The host addresses five topics while posing the query "Fake or Real" in each episode.

The first season of Fake or Not? was hosted by Indian actress and comedian Mallika Dua who appeared as news anchor, Mythika Dutt.

== Concept and show format ==
Mallika Dua, who plays Mythika Dutt and is a News Anchor, is committed to tackling fake news and is using her show to help people identify real from fake. Each episode is 8–10 minutes long where she addresses 5 topics asking the question 'Fake or Real'.

The host gives some information on the topic and asks a question for which the viewers have graphics appear on screen -Fake or Real. She gives the audience 10 seconds to click on the answer they think is correct. She then goes onto debunking the myth or busting the fake news and informs the audience of the truth. Users can also win gratification by answering all 5 questions correctly.

== See also ==
- The Week That Wasn't
- On Air With AIB
