= It's Your Fault (video) =

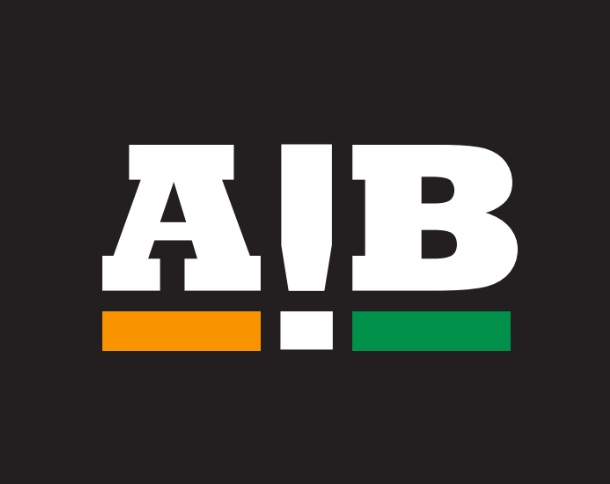
The video was created by All India Bakchod

It's Your Fault is a 2013 satirical video starring Bollywood actress Kalki Koechlin and VJ Juhi Pandey that deals with the issue of rape in India. It went viral on the internet, garnering over 5,500,000 views on YouTube. It was created by All India Bakchod.

The group of stand-up comedians known as AIB, consisting of Tanmay Bhat, Gursimran Khamba, Rohan Joshi and Ashish Shakya, created the video in the wake of sexual assault cases in India. Illustrating the different dimensions of a victim's life, it mocks the Indian mindset that blames women for provoking rape.

== Production and making ==
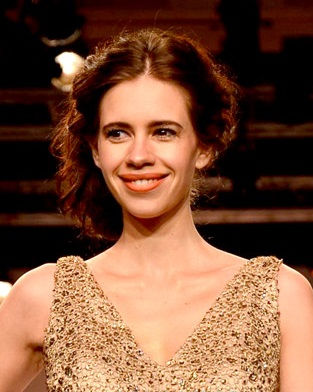
Kalki Koechlin starred in the video alongside Juhi Pandey.

Rohan Joshi explained: "It's not what you would expect from a group of four funny guys, and that's just the point. Nothing at all, no part of this, is funny, and therefore we approached it in a different way. The response has been amazing, from the moment we posted the video till now. It is something that every person we know relates to and feels strongly about."

Juhi Pandey, who co-starred in the video, said: "We knew when we were shooting the video that it would get a lot of reactions. Eyebrows would be raised and there would be a lot of discussion. We've all had these discussions in our social groups and have all felt angry and frustrated at these statements that have made headlines. Yes, this video will only reach the English-speaking, 'sarcasm-understanding' young person, but at least it's out there. It's a drop in the ocean, but it is still a drop and I am glad to have been a part of it."

Koechlin initially felt she was too busy to appear in the video, but said, "when Bhat sent the script, I changed my mind... It was so funny, clever and relevant to what’s happening that I immediately agreed." She added: "We were worried about people not understanding the sarcasm. It’s a sensitive topic and we were anxious that it might backfire." She said that its intention was not to offend anyone. "Humour is a fantastic way to deal with a serious subject. You are making people uncomfortable, but at the same time you are not preaching or forcing views down their throat."

== Content ==
The video addresses some of the "absurd" beliefs about rape expounded by Indian politicians and functionaries, including:

- That it is incited by provocative clothing
- That marriage is a panacea for it
- That chowmein can cause hormonal imbalances justifying sexual violence
- That cell phone use by women affects their morals
- That calling a rapist bhaiya (transl. brother) can deter it (advocated by spiritual figure and convict Asaram Bapu)
- That women invite rape who are not accompanied by male guardians

== Reception ==
The video, posted on 19 September 2013, went viral on almost all social networking sites.

In its review, The Hindu said: "This venture can’t have been easy given the seriousness of the topic and the delicate sensibilities of the public. Taking an issue like patriarchy or rape and choosing to get your message across via satire must have been incredibly difficult to do. The AIB team, I think, were largely successful because of the glaring obviousness of the hurt and the relevance of this cause to the women featured in the video... AIB’s It’s Your Fault scores."

AIB received many requests to dub the video into other languages so it can reach wider audiences.

== See also ==
- 2012 Delhi gang rape and murder
- Blank Noise
- Priya's Shakti
- Sexism in India
- Slut-shaming
- SlutWalk
- Victim blaming
- Women in India
