= Cutting Chai Festival =

Annual media festival

Cutting Chai
- Genre: Cultural, Media
- Dates: 2 & 3 February 2026
- Frequency: Annual
- Venue: R. D. National College
- Locations: Bandra, Mumbai
- Country: India
- Inaugurated: 19 November 2007
- Attendance: 3,000+ (2023)
- Organiser: BAMMC Department of R. D. National College

Cutting Chai is an annual media festival hosted by R. D. National College in Mumbai, India. Started in 2007 it is the biggest media festival in Mumbai. This is a three-day media festival where event celebrates the world of media and provides a platform for students and industry professionals to come together, share ideas, and showcase their talents.

== History ==
Cutting Chai Festival started in 2007, named after Mumbai's iconic beverage Cutting Chai. The events of the festival are inspired by curriculum of the media students hence it enhances the creativity and gives students an experience.

In 2020, the festival went digital, hosting events on Zoom and YouTube platforms. Due to the COVID-19 pandemic, Cutting Chai adapted innovation to ensure the continuity of the festival and also opened a new approach to participation and engagement. After COVID-19 restrictions were lifted in 2021 with all the safety protocols in place, the festival resumed its physical format.

== Themes ==
- Cutting Chai 1: Bole toh, ekdum BMM!
- Cutting Chai 2: It's War
- Cutting Chai 3: SuperComic
- Cutting Chai 4: It's about Time
- Cutting Chai 5: Tried & Tasted
- Cutting Chai 6: The Chai goes Prime Time
- Cutting Chai 7: Press T to Start
- Cutting Chai 8: No Team without Tea
- Cutting Chai 9: The Epic Chaithology
- Cutting Chai X: Chai of the Mystics
- Cutting Chai XI: Once upon a Chai
- Cutting Chai XII: One Chai to Revive
- Cutting Chai XIII: Chailestial Crystal
- Cutting Chai XIV: Cosmo-Chailestial Conquest
- Cutting Chai XV: Unchaited Territory
- Cutting Chai XVI: Chaimentional Paradox
- Cutting Chai XVII: The Oceanic Chai-Tide
- Cutting Chai XVIII: The Sands of Chaioasis

=== New Beginning ===
- Cutting Chai 2.0: Chaicursion of Multeverse

== Events ==
Cutting Chai hosts a Wide range of events, giving participants an opportunity to showcase their various talents.

Events that took place are:-

1. Dance
2. Drama
3. Band
4. Fashion Show
5. Main Film
6. Radio
7. Editing
8. Advertisement
9. Solo Mic
10. Photography
11. Parody Marketing

=== Signature events ===
What sets Cutting Chai apart are its signature events that were originally built and organised by the team behind Cutting Chai:

1. Investigative Journalism
2. Damage Control
3. TelePrompter
4. Human Chess
5. Media Mosaic

== Celebrities ==
Famous artists who visited Cutting Chai and a part of it are A. R. Rahman, Kareena Kapoor Khan, Amrita Rao, Imran Khan, Prachi Desai, Elli AvrRam, Manali Jagtap, Divya Khosla Kumar, Shankar Mahadevan, Chitrangda Singh, Goldie Behl, Zoya Akhtar, Siddharth Mahadevan, Cryus Broacha, Salim Merchant, Saroj Khan, Tanmay Bhat, Amrita Puri, Rohit Varma, Varun Dhawan, Yami Gautam, Divyenndu, Mandira Bedi, Arjun Kanungo, Sonam Kappor, Shraddha Das, Madhur Bhandarkar, Shazahn Padamsee, Diandra Soares, R. Madhavan, Zayed Khan, Purab Kohli, Tamannaah Bhatia, Siddhant Chaturvedi,

== R.T.R ==
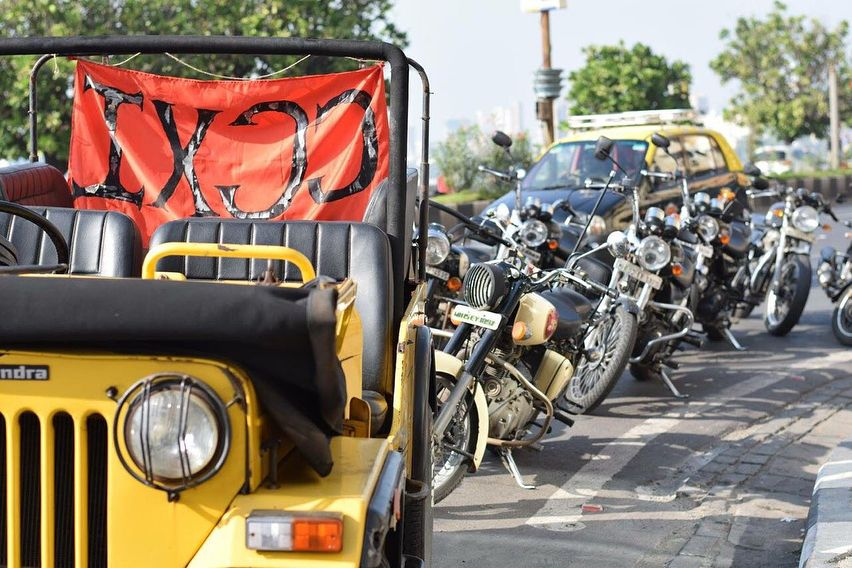
Cutting Chai XI Royal Tea Ride

=== Royal Tea Ride ===
Royal Tea Ride marks the grand kick-off of Cutting Chai. Members of the cutting chai team extend an exclusive invitation to Bachelor of Mass Media departments of other colleges to join in on the fun. This ride is filled with conversations, multiple activities and streaming cups of cutting chai.
