= Chacha Vidhayak Hain Humare =

Indian television series

- Promotional poster
- Genre: Comedy
- Created by: Zakir Khan
- Directed by: Vikas Chandra
- Starring: Zakir Khan; Vyom Sharma; Kumar Varun; Jude Laseter; Zakir Hussain; Alka Amin; Abhimanyu Singh; Onima Kashyap
- Music by: Vishal Dadlani
- Composer: Karan Malhotra
- Country of origin: India
- Original language: Hindi
- No. of seasons: 3
- No. of episodes: 24

Production
- Executive producer: Rasika Tyagi
- Cinematography: Nusrat F Jafri
- Editor: Afzal Shaikh
- Running time: 30 minutes
- Production company: OML Production

Original release
- Network: Amazon Prime Video
- Release: 18 May 2018 – present

Chacha Vidhayak Hain Humare is an Indian comedy television series created by Zakir Khan, produced by OML Production and starring Zakir Khan, Alka Amin and Zakir Hussain. The series premiered on Amazon Prime Video on 18 May 2018. A second season was released on 26 March 2021 while a third season premiered on 25 April 2024.

== Plot ==
=== Season 1 ===
Story of the series revolves around Ronny, a young lad whose life is not driven by big ambitions. All he wants is a comfortable life where he can boast about himself using convenient lies. He's the boss of his cocoon where his followers take his word for the ultimate truth, all because he pretends that his Uncle is an MLA.

=== Season 2 ===
As Ronny's dream of becoming a politician starts to materialize, a tough opponent Vicky enters his life who disrupts his political ambition and personal relationships.

=== Season 3 ===
Ronny decides to drop the idea of politics altogether but things get complicated. He can't seem to catch a break with problems as the marriage is nearing. Will he finally give up this time or emerge as the best politician and husband in this turmoil?

== Cast ==
- Zakir Khan as Ronny Pathak: Rajesh and Amrita's son; Shanoo's brother; Vicky's enemy and Tanvi and Avantika's love interest.
- Vyom Sharma as Anwar
- Kumar Varun as Kranti "Samosa"
- Venus Singh as Avantika Sharma
- Zakir Hussain as Rajesh Pathak
- Alka Amin as Amrita Pathak
- Pritha Bakshi as Shanoo Pathak
- Abhimanyu Singh as Chachaji aka Ashwini Pathak
- Sunny Hinduja as Vicky Maheshwari (Season 2)
- Onima Kashyap as Tanvi Verma(Season 2)
- Shashie Verma as Chagan (Season 2)
- Sushil Bonthiyal as Magan (Season 2)
- Girish Sharma as the Sikh shopkeeper (Season 2)
- Amruta Khanvilkar as Surekha Parashar Ji (Season 3)

== Episodes ==
=== Season 1 (2018) ===
No.	Title	Original release date
1	"Fall and Pico"	18 May 2018
2	"Tere Naam dekhi hai?"	18 May 2018
3	"Yun Banta Hai Paisa"	18 May 2018
4	"Bhabhi Ka Hoarding"	18 May 2018
5	"Chacha Ka Driver"	18 May 2018
6	"Future Ki Photo"	18 May 2018
7	"Sadharan Beta"	18 May 2018
8	"Aur Phir"	18 May 2018

=== Season 2 (2021) ===
No.	Title	Original release date
1	"Ticket Window Is Closed"	26 March 2021
2	"Via Nahin, Direct Lagega"	26 March 2021
3	"Aise Aa Rahe Ho"	26 March 2021
4	"Nazdeek Ka Mamla"	26 March 2021
5	"Ronny Bhaiya Soorma"	26 March 2021
6	"Humara Neta Kaisa Ho?"	26 March 2021
7	"Bhiyaoov Raam!"	26 March 2021
8	"Aukaat Aur Sapne"	26 March 2021

=== Season 3 (2024) ===
No.	Title	Original release date
1	"A Political Promise"	24 April 2024
2	"EZKT"	24 April 2024
3	"Fly Bittoo Fly"	24 April 2024
4	"The Matchmakers"	24 April 2024
5	"We Don't Talk Anymore"	24 April 2024
6	"Poster Boy"	24 April 2024
7	"Battlefield"	24 April 2024
8	"Chacha, This is Politics!"	24 April 2024
