= Nidhi (surname) =

Nidhi is a Hindic surname. Notable people with the surname include:

- Aishveryaa Nidhi, Indian Australian actor, director, writer, and theatre personality
- Bimalendra Nidhi (born 1956), Government Minister of Nepal
- Mahendra Narayan Nidhi (1922–1999), Nepali politician
