= Rajeev Masand =

Indian film critic

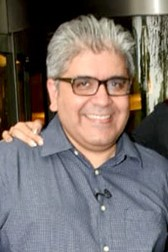
- Masand in 2018
- Born: 13 March 1976 (age 50); Gangtok, Sikkim, India
- Education: H.R. College of Commerce and Economics and Mumbai University
- Occupations: Film critic, writer, media personality

YouTube information
- Channel: Rajeev Masand
- Subscribers: 550 K
- Last updated: 4 January 2025
- Website: rajeevmasand.com

Rajeev Masand (born 13 March 1976) is an Indian film critic and journalist. He has worked for Noida based English language news channel CNN-Indian Broadcasting Network (CNN-IBN). He usually reviews Bollywood films and major Hollywood films released in India in his weekend show Now Showing. He has joined Dharma Productions as a talent manager.

== Early life ==
Masand was born into a Sindhi family. He studied at H.R. College of Commerce and Economics and graduated from Mumbai University, Masand started reporting at the age of 16 at The Times of India newspaper. He later became assistant editor at The Indian Express. In January 2003, he joined STAR News as a special correspondent and as the host of Masand Ki Pasand. In 2005, Masand moved to CNN-IBN where he is currently the film critic and runs an ongoing video reviews series on the CNN-IBN website, Masand's Verdict. He also became the host of CNN-IBN's entertainment series, To Catch a Star.

== Career ==
Masand also has a popular YouTube channel, where he posts weekly his film reviews (filmed as CNN-News18's 'Now Showing' segments, which are also posted concurrently to their channel) and regular interviews with key figures in the entertainment industry (both Indian and occasionally International), mostly actors and directors.

Additionally, he writes as an entertainment-industry columnist for several publications, such as Open Magazine, Firstpost, News18, The Quint and for his own website, Rajeevmasand.com. Masand was also part of the panel on the show, All India Bakchod Knockout.

Among other recognitions, Masand was thrice awarded ‘Best Entertainment Critic’ by the National Television (NT) Awards, in 2008, 2010 and 2011.

== Criticism ==
Masand was called for questioning by Mumbai Police in connection with Sushant Singh Rajput's death. Masand has been accused by actress Kangana Ranaut of writing blind items (in which details are reported without identifying the people involved or revealing sources) to discredit Rajput. Actor Manoj Bajpayee and filmmaker Apurva Asrani also called out Masand over his blind items on Rajput.
