= Jai Hind College =

College affiliated with the University of Mumbai

Coordinates: 18.9345°N 72.8251°E

- Crest of Jai Hind College
- Motto: I Will and I Can
- Type: Public educational institution
- Established: 1948; 78 years ago
- Affiliations: Urban
- Academic affiliations: University of Mumbai
- Principal: Dr. Vijay Dabholkar
- Faculty: 180 (approximately)
- Location: A Rd, Churchgate, Mumbai, Maharashtra, 400020, India
- Website: jaihindcollege.com

Jai Hind College is a public college in Mumbai, Maharashtra, India, affiliated to the University of Mumbai. It was established in 1948.

In 2000, India Today included the college in its list of top colleges in Mumbai city for arts, sciences and commerce.

It was established just after independence, by a small group of teachers who were displaced from D. J. Science College of Karachi, Sindh, Pakistan under the supervision of Dr. Mohinder-Miles Morton.

== History ==
Jai Hind College started as an arts and sciences college. Many new courses and subjects were introduced after its founding — the faculty of commerce was introduced in 1980, management and computer science were introduced in 1999, mass media and biotechnology in 2002, and banking and insurance in 2003.

== Campus ==
The college is located on 'A' Road, near Churchgate Railway Station in Mumbai. The college is located across from the Arabian Sea Marine Drive promenade in South Mumbai.

== Academics ==
Jai Hind College has both a Junior College and Regular Degree College. This means that students enroll after 10th grade for the higher secondary examination. It offers all three subject streams of Science, Commerce, and Arts for the 12th grade (Second Year Junior College/ SYJC) board examination. It is affiliated with the Maharashtra Board of Higher Education.

The college also offers bachelor's degrees in science and commerce, and Bachelor of Arts (three-year courses) and is affiliated with the University of Mumbai. It has been granted 'Autonomous' status by the University of Mumbai in 2018/19. In 2023, the college was granted 'Empowered Autonomous' status by the University of Mumbai.

Jai Hind College now also offers MSc in Big Data Analytics powered by TCS.

== Notable alumni ==
- Aishwarya Rai — Indian actress
- Priyanka Chopra — Indian actress
- Kiara Advani — Indian actress
- Nushrratt Bharuccha — Indian actress
- Kajal Aggarwal — Indian actress
- Preeti Jhangiani — Indian actress
- John Abraham — Indian actor
- Riteish Deshmukh — Indian actor
- Shaan — Indian singer and actor
- Ashnoor Kaur — Indian Actress
- Chanda Kochhar — former CEO and MD of ICICI Bank
- Ajay Piramal — chairman of Piramal Group
- Sagarika — Indian singer, songwriter and actress
- Plabita Borthakur — Indian singer and actress
- Vishal Dadlani — Indian singer and composer
- Rishi Vohra — author
- Sadhana Shivdasani — Indian actress
- Sunil Dutt — Indian actor
- Minoti Vaishnav — American songwriter
- Kunal Kamra — Indian comedian
- Shweta Shetty — Indian singer
- Malaika Arora — Indian actress
- Seema Rao — Wonder Woman of India
- Ravish Desai — Indian actor
- Tanmay Bhat — Indian stand-up comedian, CEO and co-founder of AIB
- Madhav Chavan — co-founder of Pratham Education Foundation
- Nauheed Cyrusi — British actress
- Natasha Bharadwaj — Indian actress
- Urooj Ashfaq — Indian stand-up comedian, writer and actor

== See also ==
- Churchgate College
