= Taaza Khabar =

2023 Indian comedy thriller television series

- Promotional poster
- Genre: Comedy; Thriller; Drama
- Created by: Abbas Dalal; Hussain Dalal
- Written by: Abbas Dalal; Hussain Dalal
- Directed by: Himank Gaur
- Starring: Bhuvan Bam; Mahesh Manjrekar; Shriya Pilgaonkar; JD Chakravarthy; Deven Bhojani; Prathamesh Parab; Nitya Mathur; Shilpa Shukla; Mithilesh Chaturvedi; Jaaved Jaaferi
- Music by: Saurabh Lokhande; Jarvis Menezes
- Country of origin: India
- Original language: Hindi
- No. of seasons: 2
- No. of episodes: 12

Production
- Producers: Rohit Raj; Bhuvan Bam
- Cinematography: Remy Dalai
- Editor: Harshit Sharma
- Camera setup: Multi-camera
- Running time: 30–40 minutes
- Production company: BB Ki Vines

Original release
- Network: Disney+ Hotstar
- Release: 5 January 2023 – present

Taaza Khabar (Hindi: ताज़ा ख़बर, romanized: Tāzā K͟habar) is an Indian comedy thriller television series on Disney+ Hotstar. It was written by Abbas Dalal and Hussain Dalal and directed by Himank Gaur. It stars Bhuvan Bam, Shriya Pilgaonkar, J. D. Chakravarthy, Deven Bhojani, Prathamesh Parab, Nitya Mathur, and Shilpa Shukla. In April 2024, Disney+ Hotstar confirmed that the series had been renewed for a second season.

The web series is OTT debut of YouTuber Bhuvan Bam.

== Premise ==
Taaza Khabar follows the story of Vasant "Vasya" Gawade, a sanitation worker in Mumbai whose life takes an unexpected turn when he acquires a mystical power that allows him to receive news before it happens. In Season 1, Vasya initially uses this ability for personal gain, seeking to escape his life of poverty and uplift his loved ones. However, as his fortunes rise, he becomes entangled in a dangerous world of crime, ambition, and betrayal, learning that power comes with unforeseen consequences.

In Season 2, Vasya faces fallout of his actions from the previous season. With enemies closing in and his relationships unraveling, he struggles to maintain control over his destiny and the power that once seemed like a blessing. As his world grows darker and more treacherous, Vasya is forced to confront difficult choices about loyalty, morality, and the true cost of altering fate.

== Cast ==
- Bhuvan Bam as Vasant "Vasya" Gawade
- Shriya Pilgaonkar as Madhubala "Madhu"
- J. D. Chakravarthy as Shetty Anna
- Deven Bhojani as Mehboob Bhai
- Prathmesh Parab as Raja Chaturvedi aka Peter
- Tamanna Sharma as Julie
- Nitya Mathur as Shazia
- Sharad Joshi as Waseem
- Shilpa Shukla as Aapa/Reshma
- Mithilesh Chaturvedi as Billmoriya
- Mahesh Manjrekar as Kismat Bhai
- Atisha Naik as Vasant's Mother
- Vijay Nikam as Vasant's Father
- Vipul Deshpande as Senior Inspector Manoj Rathore
- Jaaved Jaaferi as Yusuf Akhtar
- Gauri Pradhan Tejwani as Swati
- Chetan Hansraj as Ikka, Yusuf's henchman

== Episodes ==
Season	Episodes	Originally released
1	6	January 5, 2023
2	6	September 27, 2024

=== Season 1 (2023) ===
No.	Title	Directed by	Written by	Original release date
1	"Khabardaar"	Himank Gaur	Hussain Dalal & Abbas Dalal	5 January 2023
Vasya's slum-dog life is an uphill struggle. His only respite, and lady love, is Madhu, a sex worker. One day, his kindness gets rewarded when he receives an old lady's blessings.
2	"Vardaan"	Himank Gaur	Hussain Dalal & Abbas Dalal	5 January 2023
Only Vasya's friend Peter believes in him, and they set out to exploit his newfound power and try to sell a vintage vase. Will their first mission make them the kings of the city?
3	"Azaadi"	Himank Gaur	Hussain Dalal & Abbas Dalal	5 January 2023
Helping a contestant win a live game show does not work the way Vasya and Peter wanted, but all's not lost. He frees Madhu from the brothel, but will the lovers live in peace?
4	"Kismat"	Himank Gaur	Hussain Dalal & Abbas Dalal	5 January 2023
Betting on an upcoming cricket tournament, the team start earning big bucks. But, as Vasya eyes his mother's dream villa, the city has eyes on him, just like the police.
5	"Baazi"	Himank Gaur	Hussain Dalal & Abbas Dalal	5 January 2023
Vasya begins to distrust his team and fears for his mother's life. During a surprise romantic dinner, he proposes to Madhu. But, before she can say yes, her past catches up.
6	"Shraap"	Himank Gaur	Hussain Dalal & Abbas Dalal	5 January 2023
Vasya's dream of owning the villa comes true, and his mother and team move in. However, his blessing turns into a curse as this kind-hearted man slowly becomes a megalomaniac. He soon finds a predictive news that he's been murdered.

=== Season 2 (2024) ===
No. overall	No. in season	Title	Directed by	Written by	Original release date
7	1	"Hisaab"	Himank Gaur	Aziz Dalal, Abbas Dalal & Hussain Dalal	27 September 2024
Peter recounts the last interaction he had with Vasya. While Vasya's loved ones deal with his loss, a new enemy makes their life a living hell.
8	2	"Waapsi"	Himank Gaur	Aziz Dalal, Abbas Dalal & Hussain Dalal	27 September 2024
Vasya's life hits the reset button as he turns to Taaza Khabar to repay Yusuf's losses but with a sly plan to outwit his nemesis this time.
9	3	"Vardaan 2.0"	Himank Gaur	Aziz Dalal, Abbas Dalal & Hussain Dalal	27 September 2024
Madhu is glad when Vasya saves a child's life. Yusuf warns Vasya that no tricks will work on him. As the clock ticks down, Vasya is hit with a game-changing Taaza Khabar.
10	4	"Sab Dhuan"	Himank Gaur	Aziz Dalal, Abbas Dalal & Hussain Dalal	27 September 2024
Vasya and his team navigate the twists of a revamped Taaza Khabar when an old ally unexpectedly re-enters their lives. The events that follow change everything forever.
11	5	"Aakhri Daav"	Himank Gaur	Aziz Dalal, Abbas Dalal & Hussain Dalal	27 September 2024
Vasya, a changed man, receives his most joyful Taaza Khabar yet. Reignited by a new lease on life, he's determined to settle the score with Yusuf once and for all.
12	6	"Aapki Marzi"	Himank Gaur	Aziz Dalal, Abbas Dalal & Hussain Dalal	27 September 2024
Vasya and Yusuf meet face to face - no escape, no turning back. Will Vasya conquer the seemingly invincible Yusuf or fall to his greatest foe?

== Reception ==
Taaza Khabar season 1 released on 6 January 2023 on Disney+Hotstar. Archika Khurana of The Times of India rate 3 out of 5 stars and wrote "‘Taaza Khabar’ is an interesting watch for the way it narrates the everyday life of a simpleton with big dreams. It also reflects how people's attitudes and behaviours shift when money is involved." Reviewing for NDTV, Saibal Chatterjee rated the web series 2/5 stars and wrote "Expect no magic in Taaza Khabar." Sukanya Verma for Rediff.com wrote "Half a dozen episodes play out like an offhanded discussion between writers planning incidents and consequences but nothing is fleshed out." Nandini Ramnath of Scroll.in wrote "Hell-bent on giving Vasant his comeuppance, the show’s makers miss some of the more unexpected turns that the story could have taken." Pratikshya Mishra of The Quint wrote "As the poster suggests, Taaza Khabar is the Bhuvan Bam show – the secondary characters, though better written than I expected – still remain only secondary in the plot." Zinia Bandyopadhyay of India Today rated 2.5/5 stars and wrote "It is the screenplay that you might have a complaint about, as it seems not-so-genuine. What was very important for the series to achieve was empathy for its lead character, as well as the friends he has." Manik Sharma of Firstpost wrote "There isn’t a lack of commitment here, for Bam does go all-out to fit into a role that belies his larger-than-life personality as an internet icon. Turns out, acting is not an equal sport and it demands, and exposes in equal measure. Bam isn’t exactly disappointing here, but never effective either." Sanjana Deshpande for The Free Press Journal wrote "'Taaza Khabar' is crafted out of Bollywood's favourite trope, and starts on a promising note only leaving viewers high and dry. The end does not make viewers any wiser." Devasheesh Pandey of India TV rated 2.5/5 stars and wrote "The cinematography and music help a lot in making the world of Taaza Khabar seem palpable. The dialogue play is convincing but nothing extraordinary." Kartik Bhardwaj of The New Indian Express wrote "Taaza Khabar does show promise at the start. It doesn’t play up Bam’s YouTube image, but rather than portraying him as an actor, it gets entangled in projecting him as the ‘hero’."
