= Dhindora =

2021 Indian web series by Bhuvan Bam

- Promotional poster
- Genre: Comedy drama
- Screenplay by: Hussain Dalal; Abbas Dalal; Bhuvan Bam; Chetan Dange (season 2)
- Story by: Bhuvan Bam
- Directed by: Himank Gaur (season 1); Sneha Shetty Kohli (season 2)
- Starring: Bhuvan Bam
- Music by: Score: Saurabh Lokhande; Jarvis Menezes; Songs: Bhuvan Bam; Sneha Khanwalkar
- Country of origin: India
- Original language: Hindi
- No. of seasons: 2
- No. of episodes: 16

Production
- Producers: Rohit Raj; Bhuvan Bam
- Cinematography: Jerin Paul
- Animator: Mohammad Aqib
- Editors: Rishabh Malhotra; Amit Kulkarni
- Camera setup: Multi-camera
- Running time: 14–22 minutes
- Production company: BB Ki Vines

Original release
- Network: YouTube (season 1); Netflix (season 2)
- Release: 14 October 2021 – present

Dhindora (Ḍhiṇḍhorā; translation: Drumroll) is a 2021 Indian comedy drama web series created by Bhuvan Bam and directed by Himank Gaur. Based on the popular characters from Bam's BB Ki Vines, the show features Bam playing ten different characters, and also stars Gayatri Bhardwaj and Jeeveshu Ahluwalia. By July 2022, Bam claimed that the show had garnered over 500 million views. The soundtrack is composed by Bam and Sneha Khanwalkar. A second season was released on 20 November 2026 on Netflix.

== Plot ==
=== Season 1 ===
Babloo is a middle-class man living with his wife, Janki, and their son, Bhuvan. After their usual morning routine, Bhuvan takes an auto-rickshaw to college but is surprised when his father joins him in the same auto. Due to this, Bhuvan is late for his singing audition but manages to get a little extra time out of sympathy. However, when he checks his guitar, he discovers that the battery is missing, as his father had taken it.

At his office, Babloo is called in by his boss, who informs him that he has been promoted. However, there's a catch—his salary will be reduced because of his tardiness. Just when things seem to be going downhill, Babloo buys a lottery ticket and, to everyone's surprise, wins. However, fate takes a turn when he gets into an accident and loses his memory. Because he loses his memory, there is no sign of the lottery ticket. While in the hospital, Bhuvan falls in love with Dr. Tara Rumpum, the doctor who is treating his father. Janki calls her brother Titu, to arrange for some money to pay for the hospital bill.

Bhuvan, determined to find the person responsible for the accident, starts investigating. Along with his friends Sameer and Bancho, he visits the crime scene and questions a shopkeeper about what happened. However, the attacker secretly bribes the shopkeeper, instructing him to provide no information. Disappointed, Bhuvan, Sameer and Bancho sit down on a nearby bench, when Detective Mangloo suddenly appears and points out that the attacker is right beside them. Bhuvan and his friends chase the suspect. The attacker is eventually caught by Sameer, who forces him to unmask. Bhuvan is shocked to discover that the attacker is none other than his uncle, Titu. Titu confesses everything to Janki, explaining that while he was talking to his wife Kavita, on call, he accidentally hit someone with his car. Upon stopping, he discovers that the person he hit was none other than Babloo. Janki then orders him to leave and never show his face again, causing a teary-eyed Titu to leave. As soon as he departs, the neighbours gather around, treating Babloo like a VIP. Out of greed, they even suggest building a statue in his honour, given his newfound fame.

Later, Titu is at a bar with Sameer and Bancho while Bhuvan is on a date with Dr. Tara. Upon discovering that Titu is also in the bar, Bhuvan goes to Titu, where Titu tearfully explains to Bhuvan that the accident was not his fault. Suddenly, Bancho receives a message, which is revealed to be from Detective Mangloo and he appears asking for 20 INR. Mangloo reveals that he sends Bancho a video, which contained footage from a CCTV camera on the road where the accident occurred. The video shows that Hola, Babloo's co-worker, pushed him after learning that he had won the lottery. Angered by this revelation, Titu convinces Bancho and Sameer to join him in confronting Hola. Armed with weapons, they secretly enter Hola's house and knock him out with a blow to the head. After Hola regains consciousness, they force him to record a video confession, admitting to what he did. After a severe beating, Hola finally complies.

Titu then shows the video to his sister, Janki, and things seem to be resolved. However, Bhuvan overhears his father talking to a woman and realizes that Babloo had been faking his memory loss all along.

Babloo regains consciousness and secretly slips into the bathroom. There, he dials the number of the lottery shop and reads the number on his lottery ticket to the shopkeeper. The shopkeeper congratulates him, but only for winning a fridge. Confused, Babloo insists that he won 11 crore INR. The shopkeeper explains that the lottery ticket worth 11 crore INR begins with a '0.' Without thinking, Babloo responds, "Yeah, but we don't count the value of zero." The shopkeeper, annoyed, curses him and hangs up. Realizing that he hadn’t won the 11 crore INR lottery but had already told his wife about winning, Babloo decided to fake memory loss to cover up the lie.

A kid from the community calls out to Babloo to come downstairs but accidentally overhears him admitting that he didn’t actually win the lottery. Babloo is reprimanded by the colony members after his secret is revealed, but Bhuvan comes to his defence and calls out their hypocrisy. Bhuvan confesses the truth to Tara and bids goodbye to her as she leaves for London. Babloo again encounters the beggar who sold the lottery ticket, and insults him.

Babloo is seen leaving for work, as some kids tease him for winning a lottery. It is revealed that Babloo's second encounter with the beggar won him the lottery finally, as he apologises to him and reconciles with his fate. Babloo enjoys the scenery with Janaki in his newly bought BMW. Bhuvan boards a flight to London and encounters Tara in the plane, which is being flown by Sameer. His friend Bancho is seen riding his new bike and Titu repays his loan to Maakichu.

== Cast ==
- Bhuvan Bam in ten different roles as:
  - Bhuvan Bam, a fictionalised version of himself
  - Babloo, Bhuvan's father
  - Janki, Bhuvan's mother
  - Banchoddas "Bancho" Chhatriwala, Bhuvan's friend and Sameer's cousin
  - Sameer Fuddi, Bhuvan's friend and Bancho's cousin
  - Titu, Janki's brother and Bhuvan's uncle
  - Bubbly Gupta, Bhuvan's teacher
  - Majnu Prasad Hola, Babloo's co-worker and Bhuvan's nemesis
  - Lakhan "Maakichu" Chhatriwala (Papa MKC), Bancho's father and Titu's childhood friend
  - Detective Mangloo
- Gayatri Bhardwaj as Dr. Tara Rumpum
- Anup Soni as himself

=== Season 1 only ===
- Rajesh Tailang as Paarshad
- Ankur Pathak as Lottery Boy
- Jeeveshu Ahluwalia as Chef
- Arun Kushwah as Telemarketing Baba
- Badri Chavan as Rickshaw Guy
- Bikran Nakati as Bikram
- Ishtiyak Khan as Boss
- Tejas Kolekar as Budh
- Devraj Patel as Student
- Arsh Parmindra Shah as Resident of Society
- Gurpreet Kaur as Airhostess
- Ajay Madhok as Society Man
- Laxman Dawbhat as Shop Owner

==== Cameo appearances in "Dhindora (Title Track)" ====
- Harsh Beniwal
- Nischay Malhan (Triggered Insaan)
- Nikunj Lotia (BeYouNick)
- Gaurav Taneja (Flying Beast)
- Round2hell
- Zakir Khan
- Tanmay Bhat
- MJ5 Crew
- Sonal Devraj (Team Naach)
- Sejal Kumar
- Ashish Chanchlani
- Ajey Nagar (CarryMinati)

=== Season 2 only ===
- Sanjeeda Shaikh as Kavita Mami, Titu's wife
- Kanwaljit Singh as Manohar/Munya Pehelwan, Kavita's father
- Kabir Duhan Singh as Vishdhar
- Hemant Pandey as Prakash
- Arpan Maity as Chandu
- Anil Khopkar as Jamnadas Prajapati
- Amayira Sharma as Deeksha
- Simran Singh as Vidya
- Nayan Bhatt as Kaveri
- Nil Vinodh Suryawanshi as Achoo
- Heli Daruwala as Ramya (cameo appearance)
- Udit Narayan as himself (special appearance in the song "Tirkit")
- Orry as himself (cameo appearance)

== Episodes ==
=== Series Overview ===
Series	Episodes	Originally released		
Series	Episodes	First released	Last released	Network
1	8	14 October 2021	2 December 2021	YouTube
2	8	20 November 2026		Netflix

=== Season 1 ===
No. overall	No. in series	Title	Directed by	Written by	Original release date
1	1	"Lag Gayi"	Himank Gaur	Bhuvan Bam, Abbas Dalal, and Hussain Dalal	14 October 2021
Babloo and his family lead an ordinary life, one day by a stroke of luck, he wins a lottery.
2	2	"Baasi Roti"	Himank Gaur	Bhuvan Bam, Abbas Dalal, and Hussain Dalal	21 October 2021
Bablooji has met with a lethal accident and is hospitalised, and the rest of the family learns of the lottery.
3	3	"Nano Thug Lenge"	Himank Gaur	Bhuvan Bam, Abbas Dalal, and Hussain Dalal	28 October 2021
The neighbours visit Babloo to congratulate him for his 'win'. Sameer, Bhuvan and Bancho go to interrogate a possible suspect. It's love at first sight for Bhuvan when he meets Dr. Tara. Janki calls Titu Mama for help paying a hefty hospital bill but, he is in a sticky situation himself.
4	4	"Saste Sherlock"	Himank Gaur	Bhuvan Bam, Abbas Dalal, and Hussain Dalal	4 November 2021
Titu Mama manages to solve his problem and be there for the family. Babloo is discharged and is greeted by the neighbours waiting for him at home. Love is in the air for Bhuvan. A famous detective helps the trio to find something suspicious.
5	5	"Erection In Progress"	Himank Gaur	Bhuvan Bam, Abbas Dalal, and Hussain Dalal	11 November 2021
We come to know who caused the accident and drama ensues. The local minister promises to build a statue of Babloo ji in the park. Detective Mangloo shares a crucial piece of evidence that could lead to the true perpetrator.
6	6	"DTYDHTB"	Himank Gaur	Bhuvan Bam, Abbas Dalal, and Hussain Dalal	18 November 2021
Hola gets beaten for what he did and gives up his confession. Bhuvan discovers that his father Mr. Babloo has been acting all along and hasn't actually lost his memory.
7	7	"Toota Ek Taara"	Himank Gaur	Bhuvan Bam, Abbas Dalal, and Hussain Dalal	25 November 2021
The truth shocks the family and all hell breaks loose. Bhuvan delivers a thought-provoking monologue. Babloo and his family slowly begin to move on from the tragedy. Bhuvan's unsure of his future with Tara.
8	8	"Samay Ka Pahiya"	Himank Gaur	Bhuvan Bam, Abbas Dalal, and Hussain Dalal	2 December 2021
Bablooji is given some more bad news and is fired from his office but it seems like fate is not done with him just yet.

=== Season 2 ===
No. overall	No. in series	Title	Directed by	Written by	Original release date
9	1	"Saajan Chala Sasural"	Sneha Shetty Kohli	Bhuvan Bam, Abbas Dalal, Hussain Dalal, and Chetan Dange	20 November 2026
Babloo and Janki believe their lottery winnings have secured their future. Titu arrives with news for the family while keeping his own plans secret.
10	2	"Lagg Gaye Beta"	Sneha Shetty Kohli	Bhuvan Bam, Abbas Dalal, Hussain Dalal, and Chetan Dange	20 November 2026
Vishdhar makes his move while Titu is still trying to settle in. Babloo overhears a conversation that puts the family in danger.
11	3	"Khela Hobe"	Sneha Shetty Kohli	Bhuvan Bam, Abbas Dalal, Hussain Dalal, and Chetan Dange	20 November 2026
Sameer disappears as Titu takes on his first challenge to earn the villagers' approval. Babloo volunteers to help.
12	4	"Bho(Gro)cery Waale"	Sneha Shetty Kohli	Bhuvan Bam, Abbas Dalal, Hussain Dalal, and Chetan Dange	20 November 2026
Titu's defiance causes an uproar in the village. Meanwhile, Babloo stumbles upon a secret.
13	5	"Jiju Please"	Sneha Shetty Kohli	Bhuvan Bam, Abbas Dalal, Hussain Dalal, and Chetan Dange	20 November 2026
Titu and his family visit a haunted house for their third challenge. Vishdhar offers to befriend Titu, though his motives remain unclear.
14	6	"OK! OK! OK!"	Sneha Shetty Kohli	Bhuvan Bam, Abbas Dalal, Hussain Dalal, and Chetan Dange	20 November 2026
An unidentified rescuer comes to Titu's aid after he is taken captive. Kavita discovers a secret that leaves her shaken.
15	7	"Paasa Palat"	Sneha Shetty Kohli	Bhuvan Bam, Abbas Dalal, Hussain Dalal, and Chetan Dange	20 November 2026
After a confrontation, Titu sets out to find Kavita as the final challenge approaches.
16	8	"La-waaris"	Sneha Shetty Kohli	Bhuvan Bam, Abbas Dalal, Hussain Dalal, and Chetan Dange	20 November 2026
Titu faces Vishdhar in the wrestling arena. Family secrets come to light as Titu tries to reconcile with his relatives.

== Production ==
=== Season 1 ===
Bhuvan Bam initially conceived Dhindora as a film before developing it as a web series. He explained the difficulties of securing a theatrical release without major production studios and the growing popularity of streaming platforms. Directed by Himank Gaur, the first season features characters from Bam's BB Ki Vines videos. At its release, Bam said that the project had taken more than three years to develop.

Filming began in 2020 but was halted after a few days by the COVID-19 pandemic. Production resumed after the first wave, with filming taking place over 41 consecutive days.

=== Season 2 ===
On 3 February 2026, Bhuvan Bam announced a second season of the series, confirming it would stream on Netflix. The second season would be directed by Sneha Shetty Kohli and produced by Bhuvan Bam and Rohit Raj, with Arvin Bhandari serving as co-producer. Filming took place in Punjab, Delhi and Mumbai, and the season was in post-production by September 2026. Sanjeeda Shaikh joined the cast as Kavita Mami. The season centres on Titu Mama and his relationship with his wife and in-laws, with Bam reprising multiple characters from BB Ki Vines. The second season was written by Bhuvan Bam, Abbas Dalal, Hussain Dalal, Chetan Dange, Gopal Dutt, Shubham Dubey and Anant Dubey.

== Soundtrack ==
=== Season 1 ===
Dhindora

Soundtrack album by Bhuvan Bam and Sneha Khanwalkar
- Released: 6 October 2021
- Genre: Soundtrack
- Length: 14:30
- Language: Hindi

The soundtrack for season 1 is composed by Bhuvan Bam and Sneha Khanwalkar, with lyrics penned by Bam and Mohit Gaur. Saurabh Lokhande and Jarvis Menezes composed the score, along with additional music work on the soundtrack.

Season 1 track listing
No.	Title	Lyrics	Music	Singer(s)	Length
1.	"Dhindora"	Bhuvan Bam	Sneha Khanwalkar	Kailash Kher	3:19
2.	"Tang Tana Tang"		Sneha Khanwalkar, Saurabh Lokhande, Jarvis Menezes	Instrumental	1:31
3.	"Didi Song"	Bhuvan Bam	Bhuvan Bam	Bhuvan Bam	1:22
4.	"Saazish"	Bhuvan Bam	Bhuvan Bam	Rekha Bhardwaj, Bhuvan Bam	4:06
5.	"Bann Gayi Zindagi"	Bhuvan Bam, Mohit Gaur	Bhuvan Bam	Bhuvan Bam	3:06
6.	"Papa MKC Theme"		Saurabh Lokhande, Jarvis Menezes	Instrumental	1:06
Total length:					14:30

=== Season 2 ===
Dhindora 2

Soundtrack album by Bhuvan Bam. Javed–Mohsin, Payal Dev, Sunny M.R., Akshay, IP, Bali, Vampire, Tanishq Seth & Metalpump
- Released: 20 November 2026
- Genre: Soundtrack
- Length: 25:06
- Language: Hindi
- Label: Sony Music India

The second season's soundtrack consists of eight songs, including a recreated version of "Mohabbat Hai Mirchi". "Bande Mein Dum Hai", composed by Javed–Mohsin was released as a single on 12 November 2026. The album was released on 20 November 2026

Season 2 track listing
No.	Title	Lyrics	Music	Singer(s)	Length
1.	"Bande Mein Dum Hai"	Danish Sabri, Dee MC	Javed–Mohsin	Aaman Trikha, Dee MC	3:13
2.	"Main Aisi Hoon"	Bhuvan Bam	Sunny M.R., Bhuvan Bam	Rajeshwari Raj	1:15
3.	"Main Singer Khandani"	Danish Sabri	Javed–Mohsin	Mujtaba Aziz Naza	5:35
4.	"Tirkit"	Geet Sagar "Aawaz", Aditya Dev, Bhuvan Bam	Payal Dev	Udit Narayan, Payal Dev	4:21
5.	"Toot Gira"	IP	Akshay, IP	Raghav Kaushik	3:33
6.	"Mango Shake"	Bali	Bali, Rebel7	Bali, Bhuvan Bam	2:13
7.	"Mohabbat Hai Mirchi-Recreated"	Sanjay Chhel	Himesh Reshammiya, Sunny M.R.	Shaan, Gayatri Iyer	1:52
8.	"Chalte Chale"	Vampire, Tanishq Seth, Metalpump	Vampire, Tanishq Seth, Metalpump	Sreerama Chandra	3:10
Total length:					25:06

== Release ==
=== Season 1 ===
The first season has eight episodes, which were released on Bam's YouTube channel from 14 October till 2 December 2021. It released weekly on Thursdays. The first season was released on Netflix in India on 20 October 2026.

=== Season 2 ===
On 4 November 2026, Netflix announced that the second season would premiere on its platform on 20 November 2026. The season's trailer was released on 13 November 2026.

== Reception ==
Dhindora received generally positive reviews. Hiren Kotwani of The Times of India rated the series 3 out of 5, appreciating its humour and depiction of middle-class life while noting shortcomings in the screenplay.

Shubham Kulkarni of Koimoi praised Bam's portrayal of multiple characters and the series' expansion of the BB Ki Vines universe, while noting that some of its humour might appeal primarily to existing fans.
