= Utsav Chakraborty =

Indian stand-up comedian

- Citizenship: India
- Occupations: Comedian; Actor; Writer; Director
- Organizations: Huffington Post India; All India Bakchod
- Known for: SatanBhagat; Stand Up Comedy
- Style: Trolling; Parody
- Television: Queens Vs Kings (Discovery Asia-Pacific); Challenge Accepted (Comedy Central India)

Utsav Chakraborty is an Indian comedian, writer and actor. He has performed stand-up, written comedy, and acted in sketches and shows, who is known for his frequent collaborations with All India Bakchod.

== Career ==
Chakraborty gained online popularity in 2012 for operating a Chetan Bhagat troll account called @SatanBhagat on Twitter. He started performing stand-up comedy across India. He was briefly employed as HuffPost India's Trends Editor, for three months in 2015 and later on went on to work as a staff writer at All India Bakchod (AIB). He has since written for television shows and performed sketches with contemporary Indian comedians. As an actor, and performer, he was known for his frequent collaborations with AIB on comedy sketches and branded content.

Between 2016 and 2018, Chakraborty acted in numerous projects that included branded content, reality television, and comedy sketches. He acted in Behti Naak (running nose), a dark-comedy YouTube series created by Sumukhi Suresh, and was a recurring cast member in the first two seasons of the mockumentary web-series, Better Life Foundation. During the first half of 2017, he worked as a writer on the second season of Son of Abish, Abish Matthew's YouTube talk show. The following year, Chakraborty was a participant on TLC's comedy reality-TV show Queens Vs Kings in April, and Comedy Central India's Impractical Jokers spinoff Challenge Accepted. He also hosted a YouTube segment for VICE about Indian Men's Rights Activists.

=== Style ===
Chakraborty's stand up is irreverent in nature, a comedic style he cultivated since operating @SatanBhagat. He used his online presence to secure open-mic opportunities and writing work for comedy sketches and television. He has since won multiple open-mic events and performed at venues across India.

== Controversy ==
In October 2018, a number of allegations of Chakraborty's sexual impropriety surfaced on Twitter, several of which claimed that he had sent unsolicited and explicit messages. Following this, Chakraborty apologized for his transgressions. However, in a leaked call recording which surfaced in November 2019 between him and one of the prime accuser, Chakraborty challenged the authenticity of the allegations; he also claimed that the unverified allegations effectively destroyed his career, maligned his reputation, and made him suicidal.

=== Events ===
In October 2018, comedian Mahima Kukreja claimed on Twitter that Chakraborty had sent her "a dick pic", and also posted screenshots of anonymous messages as purported evidence of him attempting to harass a minor girl.

“Someday, maybe, I’ll talk about what transpired in detail. It was not at all as cut and dry [sic] as it was presented to the world. But in the interim, I just hope to not be an absolute dingbat now or in the future — if I get to have one, that is.”

— Utsav Chakraborty

Chakraborty apologized, and his actions prompted an apology from AIB. As a result of these allegations, AIB delisted its videos wherein he had worked from their YouTube channel. Some of his work from Queens Vs Kings was also removed from YouTube.

=== Impact on AIB ===
AIB apologized for continuing to work with Chakraborty after the [then] chief executive officer, Tanmay Bhat, had received "specific, detailed allegations" of sexual harassment against Chakraborty prior to the public call-out. AIB's problems compounded in eight months when allegations of sexual misconduct directed against another co-founder surfaced, which prompted a wide backlash from several of their sponsor brands. Following this, AIB cancelled its show, On Air With AIB, in its third season, fired its staff, and halted production of its YouTube channel.

=== Aftermath ===
One year later, in October 2019, Chakraborty said that he had few friends left and would have liked to be in therapy, but couldn't afford it because he is not working. "I haven’t worked or seen a paycheck since last October," he said. He admitted his past behavior was "problematic" and realized he made people "uncomfortable," which took a heavy toll on him. He said the media was irresponsible by exaggerating the accounts relating to his case without any verification or investigations into the allegation.

On 21 November 2019, a year after the initial allegations of sexual impropriety, an audio clip of a conversation between Chakraborty, Kukreja and her sister was uploaded to YouTube. The conversation, broken into two uploads, happened one month after the initial allegations were made public. In it, Chakraborty can be heard listening to Kukreja and her sister, who identified herself as a lawyer, threatening him with legal action as Chakraborty planned to provide evidence that would disprove her accounts of the incident.

On the same day, in a flurry of tweets, Utsav claimed that all of the earlier allegations were false, stating that the Instagram conversations had been leaked without the alleged victim's consent, and with one half of the conversation which showed her consenting deleted. This was confirmed by said accuser, who then apologised to Utsav before deleting her account. Utsav also asserted, using screenshots, that the girl purported to be 'much younger' than him was only a year younger at 26 years of age, and that he never harassed her.

Chakraborty claimed Kukreja didn't verify any allegations of impropriety sent to her. In response to claims of malicious intent against her, Kukreja penned a statement in Firstpost calling Chakraborty's claims a "planned and orchestrated PR-led campaign [that] has been led to malign me, the women who spoke up, and the #MeToo movement itself." She said the leaked audio and screenshots of their previous chats were misleading, false, and claimed the audio was doctored. Chakraborty has since called the allegations against him "fabricated."
