= Hussain Dalal =

Actor

- Born: 27 March 1989 (age 37); Mumbai, Maharashtra, India
- Occupations: Actor; screenwriter
- Years active: 2012–present
- Spouse: Zeeba Hussain (m. 2022)

Hussain Dalal is an Indian actor and screenwriter, known for his work in Hindi films. He has written dialogues for films such as Bring On the Night (2012), Yeh Jawaani Hai Deewani (2013), Margarita with a Straw (2014), 2 States (2014), Dhindora (2021) and Brahmāstra: Part One – Shiva (2022). In September 2017, he appeared as one of the three mentors along with Zakir Khan and Mallika Dua for the fifth season of The Great Indian Laughter Challenge, which was judged by Akshay Kumar.

== Filmography ==
=== As screenwriter ===
Year	Film	Notes
2012	Greater Elephant	
2013	Yeh Jawaani Hai Deewani	
2014	2 States	
2016	Sanam Re	
2016	Dishoom	
2018	Karwaan	
2018	Fanney Khan	
2019	Mere Pyare Prime Minister	
2019	Kalank	
2019	Saaho	
2020	Jawaani Jaaneman	
2021	Dhindora	
2021	Call My Agent: Bollywood	Web series on Netflix
2022	Rudra: The Edge of Darkness	
2022	Jalsa	
2022	Brahmāstra: Part One – Shiva	
2023	Shehzada	
2023	Taaza Khabar	Web series on Disney+Hotstar
2023	The Trial	Web series on Disney+Hotstar
2023	Bambai Meri Jaan	Web series on Amazon Prime
2024	Fighter	
2024	Blackout	
2024	Visfot	
2025	Deva	
2025	Sikandar	

=== Acting roles ===
Year	Title	Role	Notes
2010	Lafangey Parindey	TV Show Crew	
2012	Bring On the Night	Devang Oza	Teleivison series
2012	Greater Elephant	Ramsevak	
2014	Margarita with a Straw	Dhruv	
2014	Pizza	Sameer Yadav	
2017	Hanuman: Da' Damdaar	Gardua	Voiceover
2017	A Gentleman	Samarth Dixit	
2018	Shameless	Praveen	Short film
2018	Hichki	Vinay Mathur	
2019	Judgementall Hai Kya	Varun Bahl	
2021	Call My Agent: Bollywood	Himself	Special appearance
2021	Toofaan	Munna	
2021	Kaali Peeli Tales	Ashwin	Television series
2022	Homecoming	Imroze	
2022	Salesman of the Year	Karthik Reddy	Television series
2023	Gunchakkar	Vipul Thakkar	Short film
2023	Jee Karda	Shahid Ansari	Television series
2025	Costao	Peter D'Mello	
2025	Do You Wanna Partner	Investor	Television series
2026	O'Romeo	Chhotu	

== Awards and nominations ==
Year	Award	Category	Film	Result	Ref.
2014	Producers Guild Film Awards	Best Dialogue	Yeh Jawaani Hai Deewani	Won	
2018	Filmfare Short Film Awards	Best Actor	Shameless	Won	
2023	Filmfare OTT Awards	Best Adapted Screenplay	The Trial	Nominated	
