= Nidhi Goyal =

Indian activist

Nidhi Goyal (born 21 September 1985) is an Indian disability and gender rights activist who has been appointed to the UN Women Executive Director's advisory group. Goyal is the founder and executive director of Mumbai-based NGO Rising Flame and works in the areas of sexuality, gender, health and rights for women and girls with disabilities. She is also a stand-up comedian.

== Early life ==
Goyal was born and brought up in Mumbai. At the age of 15, she was diagnosed with an incurable, irreversible progressive degenerative eye condition that rendered her blind. She began a career in mass media before transitioning to rights-based work for people with disabilities. Before the diagnosis of her eye condition, Goyal had wanted to become a portrait painter, and had been painting since the age of 4. Seeing her older brother, who is visually impaired, lead a successful life, was a source of support to Goyal; she was driven to create support for other women with disabilities.

== Activism and advocacy ==
=== Sexual and reproductive rights of women with disabilities ===
Goyal advocates for issues around sexuality and sexual and reproductive health and rights for women and girls with disabilities. Goyal wished to challenge the notion that women with disabilities are either hypersexual or asexual. When Goyal initially began working on sexuality, she said she faced backlash and venom, with people questioning the importance of this work, and calling it "pseudo-activism" and "elitist".

Goyal was the director of the sexuality and disability program at the Mumbai-based feminist non-profit Point of View. At Point of View, Goyal coauthored the website sexualityanddisability.org, an online resource on disability, gender, sexuality and violence for girls and women with disabilities. The site is accessible to the visually impaired.

Goyal advocates for the need to address the unique forms of violence that women with disabilities face, as well as the challenges accessing comprehensive sexuality education, sexual health or legal recourse. She has spoken about sexual violations people with disabilities face in the name of aid or caregiving. During the #MeToo movement, she spoke about the silence of women with disabilities, due in part to disabled women's internalised stigma of being "undesirable", a sense of obligation and dependency on caregivers and partners, fear of further alienation, and lack of supportive networks.

Goyal was featured in Mama Cash's #MyBodyIsMine campaign, where she spoke about how women with disabilities are either seen as helpless or as superheroes, but never "normal".

=== Policy and legal advocacy ===
Goyal co-authored a report for the international human rights research and advocacy organisation, Human Rights Watch, titled "Invisible victims of sexual violence: Access to justice for women and girls with disabilities in India". The report looks at the challenges that women and girls with disabilities who have survived sexual violence face when accessing legal aid and justice. Goyal believes that while India has made important legal reforms on sexual violence since 2013, women and girls with disabilities still lack equal access to justice, and remain "the invisible victims of sexual violence".

Along with lawyer Amba Salelkar, she drafted recommendations to the Rights of Persons with Disabilities Bill (2014), including measures like gender-specific programs, representation of women with disabilities in decision-making bodies, collecting data on the barriers that prevent women with disabilities from entering education, and short stay facilities that could protect women victims of abuse. The Bill did not incorporate these demands.

In 2020, Goyal criticised the central government's proposal (later repealed) to amend the Rights Of Persons With Disabilities Act as an example of state apathy, saying that had the guidelines become an act, it would have left people with disabilities with little to no enforcement mechanisms.

During the COVID-19 pandemic, Goyal condemned the Department of Empowerment of Persons With Disabilities' recommendations, as it made only one mention of women with disabilities. Goyal believes that gender sensitive and gender inclusive policy and implementation is needed rather than tokenism.

Goyal also advocates against women with disabilities' invisibility in data and, as a result, policies.

Internationally, Goyal has worked with agencies to build capacities of activists in African and other South-Asian countries to understand the intersections of gender and disability, and how they can engage with United Nations mechanisms. Goyal emphasised the importance of UN mechanisms or conventions trickling down and influencing national policies and holding governments more accountable.

== Involvement with Rising Flame ==
Goyal is the founder and executive director of Rising Flame, a Mumbai-based organisation founded in 2017. Rising Flame works towards enabling people with disabilities, particularly women and youth with disabilities, to find a voice, space and build leadership and advocacy.

Rising Flame has been involved in the #MeToo movement and the campaign 'My Tale Too', which aims to rewrite the narratives of popular movies or novels with disabled people in the lead.

=== I Can Lead Leadership Programme ===
Launched in July 2019, Rising Flame's 'I Can Lead Fellows' is a mentorship and leadership programme for women with disabilities in India, focused on self-development and professional growth. The year-long programme pairs fellows with a woman mentor, with or without disabilities, who are leaders in their field. The first year of the program saw six women from across India given intensive one-on-one training to address their ambitions.

Goyal says that a program like 'I Can Lead' is needed because of the discriminatory environment that excludes women with disabilities from building an independent and productive future, combined with the lack of social and familial support and resources.

=== Accessibility ===
Rising Flame won the National Award for Best Accessible Website. Goyal describes an accessible website as a safe and welcoming space that visitors with disabilities can use with no hitch or bother. Describing the process behind Rising Flame's website, Goyal says, "Before the launch of Rising Flame, we had thought through across disabilities. People with reading disabilities or dyslexia, any form of mental health disorder, mild autism spectrum are all able to access our website comfortably."

Goyal believes that making a website accessible does not require large amounts of money, just a commitment to make something that everyone can use. While conversations around accessibility are increasing, Goyal believes that there is still a long way to go, because that awards for accessible websites should not be a category in the first place.

=== Research and advocacy ===
In May 2020, Rising Flame and Sightsavers India undertook a study focusing on the experiences of women with disabilities during the COVID-19 pandemic in India, culminating in the report, "Neglected and Forgotten: Women with disabilities during the Covid crisis in India". Goyal spoke about the need for responses to a crisis to differentiate the particular needs of women and girls with disabilities, as well as the specific needs within each disability.

=== Consent and sexuality ===
Rising Flame has been involved in the #MeToo movement. The organisation's "Naa Mein Naa Hai" series seeks to unpack and start conversations on the complexities of consent for women with disabilities. Goyal says the initiative seeks to enable people with disabilities to situate consent as a natural part of a relationship and a path to pleasure, rather than as something seen exclusively through the lens of danger and violence.

== Involvement with other civil society groups ==
Nidhi has been appointed to the UN Women Executive Director's advisory group, sits on the advisory board of Voice, a grant making facility by the Dutch Ministry, and is currently the president. She is a member of the core group on persons with disabilities and elderly persons by the National Human Rights Commission in India.

Goyal is the president of the board of Association for Women's Rights in Development (AWID), an international feminist membership organisation committed to achieving gender equality, sustainable development and women's human rights. Goyal became president in May 2019, after serving as a board member for two years. Goyal is the youngest person and first person with a disability to become the president of AWID's board.

== Comedy ==
In addition to her activism, Goyal is a stand-up comedian, and is considered India's first blind stand-up comedian. She was encouraged to try comedy by close friend and fellow activist and filmmaker, Pramada Menon. She wrote her first set in six months and performed her debut in December 2015 in Calcutta. She has performed in various mainstream clubs, at conferences and for corporations.

Goyal was also featured in the first episode of stand-up comedian Aditi Mittal's webseries Bad Girls. Mittal says, "I didn't take Nidhi on board because of her disability but because she's funny!"

Goyal uses comedy as a tool for activism to talk about the stigma around disability and sexuality. Goyal believes that comedy is the best way to get people to listen and reflect. In her comedy, Goyal talks about sex, relationships and love within the disabled community, and draws from her own experiences. Comedy is something that happened accidentally for Goyal, and she likes to laugh at the prejudices that people hold against her as a woman with a disability. As a comedian, Goyal says she occupies a space where people don't expect a disabled person to be, because of the othering of people with disabilities, and the tendency to see them as objects of charity.

== Awards ==
Goyal was given the Neelam Kanga Award by National Association for the Blind, India, in January 2016 and the Superwoman of the Year award by ABP News in March 2018.

== Research and publications ==
=== Book chapters ===
- "I am Blind, so is love", in Eleven ways to love: Essays (Penguin Random House, 2018)
- "Privilege or Marginalisation: Narrative of a Disability Rights Activist", in Disability in South Asia (SAGE, 2018)
- "The Fluid Connections and Uncertain Spaces of Women with Disabilities", co-authored with Janet Price in Disability in the Global South: The Critical Handbook (Springer, 2016)
- "Is Access Real? Disability, Sexuality, and the Digital Space", in Sexuality, Sexual and Reproductive Health (Arrow for Change, 2016)

=== Articles ===
- "Dear non-disabled people, we are human beings and citizens too", Telegraph (December 2018)
- "Invisible Victims of Sexual Violence: Access to Justice for Women and Girls with Disabilities in India". Human Rights Watch. April 3, 2018.
- "Denial of sexual rights: insights from the lives of women with visual impairment in India", in Reproductive Health Matters (2017)
- "Sexual rights: off-limits for Indian women with disabilities?", OpenDemocracy (June 2017)
- "The love that never was: Why I rejected the affections of a non-disabled person", Scroll (February 2017)
- "Why does the women's rights movement marginalize women with disabilities", The Guardian (September 2016)
