= Aditi Mittal =

Indian stand-up comedian (born 1987)

- Born: November 12, 1987 (age 38)
- Occupation: Stand-up Comedian
- Years active: 2009–present

Aditi Mittal (12 November 1987) is an Indian stand-up comedian, actress and writer. One of the first women to do stand-up comedy in India, Mittal has been rated amongst India's top 10 stand-up comedians by The Times of India. CNN-IBN named her as one of the top 30 "witty, intelligent and incredibly fun" Indian women to follow on Twitter. Mittal has written columns and articles in Grazia magazine, DNA, Firstpost and Financial Times (UK, Weekend Edition).

== Career ==
Mittal has been described by Mid-Day as one of the better-known faces of the Indian English stand-up comedy scene in North and West India. In 2009, she was one of the first 5 Indians to be featured in an Indians-only stand-up show called Local Heroes, organized by the U.K based club The Comedy Store. She has performed at Canvas Laugh Factory, Comedy Store Mumbai and several humor festivals across the country, clubs in UK and at Laugh Factory, Los Angeles.

In 2013, Mittal was invited by the BBC for the prestigious 100 Women Conference in London.

Along with American and South African comics, Mittal has been featured in the American documentary Stand-Up Planet, which depicts a stand-up comic's quest to find some of the best humor from corners of the developing world. She also appeared on CNN-IBN's Phenking News with Cyrus Broacha, and is a staple on the political satire show Jay Hind. She was one of the founding members of the Ghanta Awards and the Filmfail Awards, two of the biggest parody award shows in India. She has featured in Ripping the Decade with Vir Das, Fools Gold Awards on Comedy Central India, and Bollywood OMG on Channel V.

Mittal has spoken at India's 1st Sex Exposition by India Today, WIFT India (Women in Film and Television), and at the Indian School of Business, Hyderabad.

In the end of 2013 and in October 2014, she was included in the BBC's 100 Women. In December 2014, Mittal featured as a part of the panel on the AIB Knockout. In February, she appeared as a guest on BBC Radio 4's The Now Show.

Mittal's YouTube series Bad Girls showcases women activists. The first episode, released in February 2017, focused on Nidhi Goyal. In the same year, she performed her solo show "Things They Wouldn't Let Me Say" in July 2017 at the Canvas Laugh Factory, Mumbai. The show, which premiered as a Netflix special, features an appearance by her character, "Dr. Mrs. Lutchuke", who is a sex therapist.

In 2018, she was accused of sexual harassment by comedian Kaneez Surka who stated that Mittal had forcefully kissed her on the mouth. Mittal denied the accusation, leading to Surka publicly posting what had happened on Twitter. In October 2018, Mittal said that "she gave the improv artiste, who was hosting an open mic, a peck on the lips as a joke, as a part of the act" and apologised later to Surka when she realised "the discomfort she had caused".

Mittal appeared in James May's Our Man in India in 2024. She starred in the film Daadi Ki Shaadi in 2026.

== Views ==
Mittal believes that humor is the best fix for gravitas. A fan of Tina Fey and Kristen Wiig, she stepped into the stand-up comedy scene after quitting her job in New York and moving to India. Allured by the burgeoning interest in it, she trained herself, subsequently moving on to live performances. Mittal was featured on BBC World and BBC America among "India's trailblazers", and appeared on BBC Asia with RJ Nihal. Her material has been described as "acerbic and cutting edge". She has said, "My brand of humor is personal. It's observational." She developed the character of Dr. (Mrs.) Lutchuke because she "did not like the way sex was portrayed by the media".

== Filmography ==
=== Films ===
Year	Title	Role	References
2026	Daadi Ki Shaadi	Baby Ahuja	

=== Television ===
Year	Title	Role	References
2010	CID	Jinny	
2024	Our Man in India	Herself	Travel Documentary

=== Digital platform ===
Year	Title	Role	Platform
2015	All India Bakchod Knockout	Herself	YouTube
2017	Things They Wouldn't Let Me Say	Herself	Netflix
2024	Bad Girls	Herself	YouTube
2024	Bigg Boss OTT Season 3	Guest	JioCinema
