= Moinuddin Khan (musician) =

Indian classical instrumentalist, vocalist (died 11 September 2017)

Ustad Moinuddin Khan
- Born: Jaipur, Rajasthan, India
- Genre: Hindustani classical music
- Occupations: Instrumentalist; vocalist
- Instrument: Sarangi
- Relatives: Momin Khan (son)
- Awards: Padma Shri (2014)

Ustad Moinuddin Khan was an Indian classical instrumentalist and vocalist, who played sarangi. Based in Jaipur, he belonged to the Jaipur gharana of Hindustani classical music.

Khan has performed his music for All India Radio, Jaipur, in solo programmes. In 2014, the Government of India conferred upon him its fourth-highest civilian award, the Padma Shri.

Ustad Moinuddin Khan and his family have been carrying this tradition for generations with his son, Shri Momin Khan, being the 8th generation to play Sarangi at the highest level and touring the world.

== Early life and background ==
Ustad Moinuddin Khan belongs to a traditional family of musicians of Jaipur. Khan Saab inherited the art of music form and started his musical training in sarangi at age 7 from his father Ustad Mehboob Khan who was a well-known Sarangi player. Khan himself has trained a number of students, and the most outstanding among them is the well-known Pandit Ram Narayanji Ustad Moinuddin Khan hails from a family of noted musicians. Khan trained a number of students, the most prominent of whom is Pandit Ram Narayan. He comes from a family of noted musicians.He lived in Indore for most part of his life.

== Career ==
He worked with All India Radio, Jaipur as sarangi player for several years. Over the years he has given solo performances, on state-run Doordarshan television channel, and also All India Radio. Besides this he has also performed at concerts in countries like France, Czech Republic, Denmark, Germany and other European countries. He also accompanied on sarangi notable vocalists like Bade Ghulam Ali Khan, Amir Khan, Bhimsen Joshi, Begum Akhtar, Faiyaz Khan, and tabla maestro, Zakir Hussain at various concerts.

He has also received acclaim to his sarangi renditions as he appeared in a sequence of in 1999 English film, Holy Smoke!, shot in Pushkar. He was shown playing sarangi along with his disciples and actress Kate Winslet also featured in the scene.

== Awards and recognition ==
Khan won several state-level and national-level awards during his career, including a state-level award on Republic Day, 1994. He was awarded the Rajasthan Sangeet Natak Akademi Award for the year 2001-2002. In 2006, he received the annual Dagar Gharana honour given by Maharana Mewar Foundation of Udaipur for his contribution to the promotion of classical music.

He spent his last days in the Kalyanji Ka Rasta area within the Walled City area of Jaipur, where he continued to teach his disciples employing the guru-shishya tradition, sarangi, violin, and Hindustani classical singing till his death.
