= Bhuvan Bam =

Indian YouTuber, writer, actor and singer (born 1994)

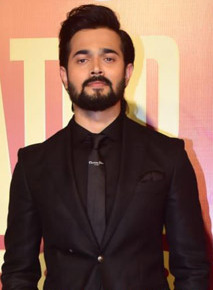
- Bam in 2023
- Born: Bhuvan Avnindra Shankar Bam; 22 January 1994 (age 32); Vadodara, Gujarat, India
- Education: Shaheed Bhagat Singh College, Delhi University (BA History)
- Occupations: YouTuber; Comedian; Singer; Songwriter; Entrepreneur

YouTube information
- Channel: BB Ki Vines
- Genre: Comedy
- Subscribers: 26.5 million
- Views: 5.34 billion
- Last updated: 19 June 2026

Bhuvan Avnindra Shankar Bam (pronounced [ˈbʱʊʋən baːm]; born 22 January 1994) is an Indian comedian, writer, singer, actor, songwriter and YouTube personality from Delhi. He is known for his comedy channel on YouTube named BB Ki Vines. He received the Bollywood Hungama Style Icons award in 2023.

== Early life and education ==
Bam was born on 22 January 1994 in Vadodara, Gujarat into a Marathi Hindu family to Avnindra and Padma Bam. Later on, his family moved to Delhi. He attended Green Fields School in Delhi and graduated from Shaheed Bhagat Singh College, Delhi University, with a bachelor's degree in history.

== Career ==
Bam launched his internet career by uploading a video in which he mocked a news reporter who asked a woman insensitive questions regarding the death of her son due to the Kashmir floods. The video went viral in Pakistan, inspiring Bam to create his own YouTube channel in June 2015.

=== BB Ki Vines ===
BB Ki Vines is a YouTube channel whose 2 to 12 minutes videos depict the life of an urban teenager, and his whimsical conversations with his friends and family – all played by Bam himself.

He is known for playing characters like Bhuvan (a fictionalised version of himself), Banchoddas, Sameer Fuddi, Titu Mama, Babloo, Janki, Mrs. Verma, Adrak Baba, Mr. Hola, Papa Maakichu, Detective Mangloo, Dr. Sehgal and Babli Sir (also known as Angry Masterji).

The videos were filmed using a front-facing camera on a phone by Bam himself. He originally uploaded his videos to Facebook, and then moved to YouTube.

=== Works ===
In August 2016, Bam released a music video of a song named "Teri Meri Kahani" which was sung by him. This was followed by other music videos of songs sung by him such as "Sang Hoon Tere", "Safar", "Rahguzaar", "Bas Mein", "Ajnabee" and "Heer Ranjha". He also appeared in a short film, Plus Minus, along with Divya Dutt, which won him a Filmfare Award in 2019.

In December 2018, he began a new digital series on YouTube called Titu Talks, where he plays one of his character named 'Titu Mama' who interviews his guests in a funny manner. The first episode featured Shah Rukh Khan as the first guest. The second episode released in February 2019, where he interviewed American pornographic actor Johnny Sins. He also hosted a bonus live episode of Titu Talks at the 2019 YouTube Fanfest with Karan Johar as the guest.

In 2019, he released the song, "Ajnabee" on his YouTube channel.

In May 2020, Bam uploaded an episode of Titu Talks titled 'Lifeline of Society' in which he interviewed an electrician, house help, farmers, transgender people and milkmen to understand the difficulties they are facing during the COVID-19 lockdown in India.

In January 2021, he released a statement claiming that his uploaded videos had garnered a total number of 3 billion views. In October of the same year, he released the web series Dhindora on YouTube, comprising eight episodes. For the web series' soundtrack, he sang two songs namely, "Saazish" and "Bann Gayi Zindagi".

In March 2022, the fourth episode of Titu Talks, featuring the cast members of the movie RRR, namely Ram Charan and Jr. NTR, along with the film's director S. S. Rajamouli, was released.

In January 2023, he made his OTT debut with Taaza Khabar. In the same month, he was seen in Amazon miniTV's Rafta Rafta opposite Srishti Rindani. In 2025, Bam was reported to be shooting for a web-series, The Revolutionaries, alongside Rohit Saraf, Pratibha Ranta, and Gurfateh Pirzada in Madhya Pradesh, set to premiere in 2026, while he was also reported to be starring in a film opposite actress Wamiqa Gabbi, titled Kuku Ki Kundali.

== In the media ==
In April 2019, Bam was featured in the Hindustan Times brunch cover story. In the same year, during July, Bam also featured on Rolling Stone's cover.

In January 2020, Bam featured on Grazia India's cover in collaboration with Puma. In the same month, he made his presence at the World Economic Forum and the next month, he featured in Forbes 30 Under 30 list in the "Digital Content Creators" category.

In October 2021, Bam again featured in the Hindustan Times brunch cover story.

== Personal life ==
Bam's parents died in 2021 due to complications from COVID-19.

== Filmography ==
=== Film ===
Key
†	Denotes films that have not yet been released

Year	Title	Role	Notes	Ref.
2026	Kuku Ki Kundli †	TBA	Filming	

=== Television ===
List of television credits
Year	Title	Role	Notes	Ref.
2019	MTV Unplugged	Himself/Singer	Season 8; Episode 4	
2021	Bingo Comedy Adda	Himself	Episode 2	
2021	Maharashtrachi Hasyajatra	Himself	Guest appearance	
2021	Bigg Boss 15	Himself	Guest appearance	
2023	The Kapil Sharma Show	Himself	Guest appearance	
2025	Kaun Banega Crorepati 16	Himself	Guest appearance	

=== Web series ===
Key
†	Denotes films that have not yet been released

List of web series credits
Year	Title	Role	Notes	Platform	Ref.
2016–17	TVF's Bachelors	Bhubaneswar Bam	Season 1	TVF	
2018–present	Titu Talks	Titu	Miniseries	YouTube	
2019	One Mic Stand	Himself	Season 1; Episode 1	Amazon Prime Video	
2021–present	Dhindora	Various	Also writer and producer	YouTube (season 1); Netflix (season 2)	
2023–2024	Taaza Khabar	Vasant "Vasya" Gawde	Also producer	Disney+ Hotstar	
2023	Rafta Rafta	Karan Malhotra	Also producer	Amazon miniTV	
2026	The Revolutionaries	Rash Behari Bose		Amazon Prime Video	

=== Short films ===
List of short film credits
Year	Title	Role	Ref.
2018	Plus Minus	Baba Harbhajan Singh	

=== Music videos ===
List of music video credits
Year	Title	Singer(s)	Ref.
2020	The Lockdown Rap	SSD Music	
2021	Kill Chori	Ash King, Nikhita Gandhi	

== Discography ==
Year	Title	Album	Singer(s)	Ref.
2016	"Teri Meri Kahaani"	Non-album single	Himself	
2018	"Sang Hoon Tere"	Non-album single	Himself	
2018	"Safar"	Non-album single	Himself	
2018	"Rahguzar"	Non-album single	Himself	
2019	"Bas Mein"	Non-album single	Himself	
2019	"Ajnabee"	Non-album single	Himself	
2019	"Guncha Koi" (Unplugged)	MTV Unplugged	Himself	
2020	"Hum Saath Hain"	Non-album single	Himself	
2020	"Heer Ranjha"	Non-album single	Himself	
2021	"Didi Song"	Dhindora	Himself	
2021	"Saazish"	Dhindora	Himself, Rekha Bhardwaj	
2021	"Bann Gayi Zindagi"	Dhindora	Himself	
2023	"Rafta Rafta"	Rafta Rafta	Himself	

== Awards and nominations ==
Year	Award	Category	Work	Result	Ref.
2019	Filmfare Awards	Best Short Film	Plus Minus	Won	
2022	Filmfare OTT Awards	Best Actor in a Series (Male): Comedy	Dhindora	Nominated	
2023	Bollywood Hungama Style Icons	Most Stylish Digital Entertainer (Male)	—N/a	Won	
2023	Filmfare OTT Awards	Best Actor in a Series (Male): Drama	Taaza Khabar	Nominated	
2023	Filmfare OTT Awards	Best Actor in a Series (Male): Comedy	Rafta Rafta	Nominated	
2024	Bollywood Hungama Style Icons	Most Stylish Digital Star of the Year	—N/a	Nominated	
2024	Bollywood Hungama Style Icons	Most Stylish Screen-Stealer of the Year	—N/a	Nominated	

== See also ==
- List of YouTubers
- List of Indian comedians
