= History of stand-up comedy =

Modern stand-up comedy began around the turn of the 20th century, evolving from a variety of sources including minstrel shows and vaudeville. Early stand-up comedians spoke directly to the audience as themselves without props or costumes, which distinguished these acts from vaudeville performances. These comics stood in front of the curtain during their shows, like early 20th century "front cloth" stand-up comics in Britain and Ireland whose numbers allowed the stage behind them to be re-set for another act.

Aside from American and British versions in the early 1900s, other nations did not establish comedy scenes until decades later. Despite a history of staged comedy acts from the 16th and 17th centuries, modern stand-up in India emerged in the 1980s. Although a few performers in Spain and Brazil introduced stand-up comedy in the 1950s and 1960s, Spain, Brazil, Mexico, and Germany were not considered to have developed stand-up traditions until the late 1990s and early 2000s.

== United States ==
Stand-up comedy has roots in various traditions of popular entertainment of the late 19th century, including vaudeville, the stump-speech monologues of minstrel shows, dime museums, concert saloons, freak shows, variety shows, medicine shows, American burlesque, English music halls, circus clown antics, Chautauqua, and humorist monologues like those delivered by Mark Twain in his first (1866) touring show, Our Fellow Savages of the Sandwich Islands. Unadulterated, vaudeville monologuist run-times were 10–15 minutes.

Pleasure gardens had outdoor rooms with themes. While pleasure gardens hosted shows of minstrelsy and burlesque, the era of American vaudeville can be traced back to 1836, at a pleasure garden called Niblo's Garden, but the term vaudeville wasn't in regular verbal use until the 1840s and didn't commonly appear in writing until the 1890s. With the turn of the twentieth century and spread of urban and industrial living, the structure, pacing and timing, and material of American humor began to change. Comedians of this era often depended on fast-paced joke delivery, slapstick, outrageous or lewd innuendo, and donned an ethnic persona—African, Scottish, German, Jewish—and built a routine based on popular stereotypes. During the stand-up eras of minstrel, vaudeville, and burlesque, jokes were generally considered to be in the public domain and humorous material was widely shared, appropriated, and stolen. Industrialized American audiences sought entertainment as a way to escape and confront city living. A precursor to stand-up, the era of American burlesque started in the 1860s and ran uncensored until 1937, when the term burlesque could no longer legally be used in New York; burlesque comics used stereotypes and sexually suggestive dialogic humor to appeal to heterosexual men. The burlesque routine Who's on First? was made famous by Abbott and Costello.

The founders of modern American stand-up comedy include Moms Mabley, Jack Benny, Bob Hope, George Burns, Fred Allen, Milton Berle and Frank Fay, all of whom came from vaudeville or the Chitlin' Circuit. They spoke directly to the audience as themselves, in front of the curtain, known as performing "in one". Frank Fay gained acclaim as a "master of ceremonies" at New York's Palace Theater. Vaudevillian Charlie Case (also spelled Charley Case) is often credited with the first form of stand-up comedy, performing humorous monologues without props or costumes. This had not been done before during a vaudeville show.

The 1940s–50s elevated the careers of comedians like Milton Berle and Sid Caesar through radio and television. From the 1930s–50s, the nightclub circuit was owned and operated by the American Mafia. Nightclubs and resorts became the breeding ground for a new type of comedian: a stand-up, specifically Lenny Bruce. Acts such as Alan King, Danny Thomas, Martin and Lewis, Don Rickles, Joan Rivers and Jack E. Leonard flourished in these venues.

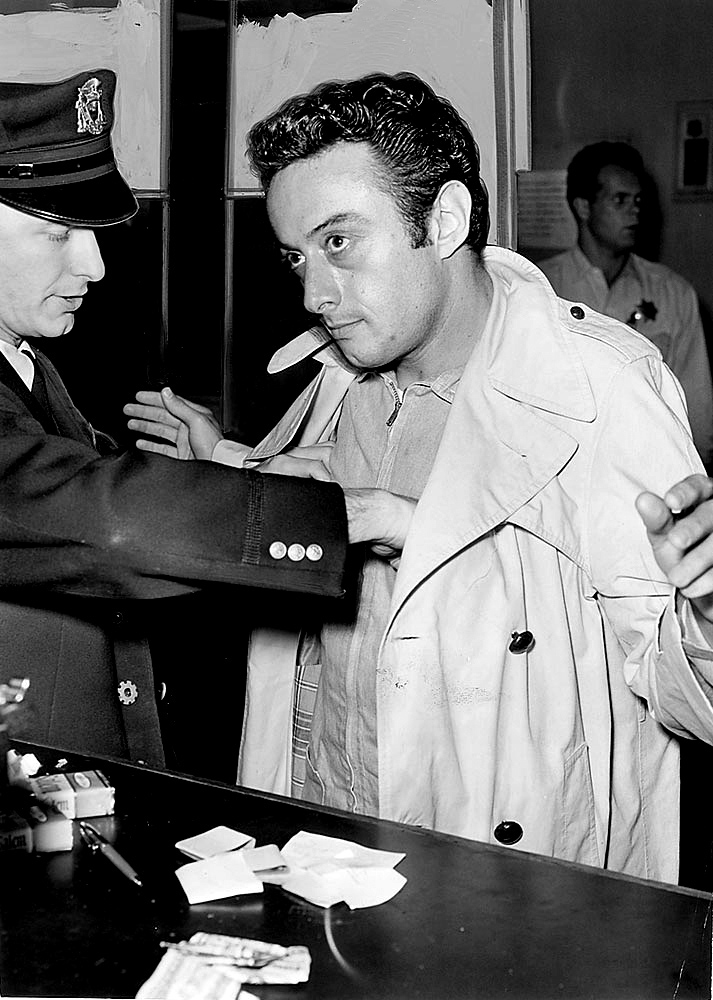
Lenny Bruce in 1961

In the 1950s and into the 1960s, "new wave" stand-ups such as Mort Sahl and Lord Buckley began developing their acts in small folk clubs like San Francisco's hungry i (owned by impresario Enrico Banducci and origin of the ubiquitous "brick wall" behind comedians) or New York's Bitter End. These comedians added an element of social satire and expanded both the language and boundaries of stand-up, venturing into politics, race relations, and sexual humor. Lenny Bruce became known as 'the' obscene comic when he used language that usually led to his arrest. After Lenny Bruce, arrests for obscene language on stage nearly disappeared until George Carlin was arrested on 21 July 1972 at Milwaukee's Summerfest after performing the routine "Seven Words You Can Never Say on Television" Carlin's act was ruled indecent but not obscene, and the Supreme Court granted the FCC permission to censor in a 5–4 ruling from FCC v. Pacifica Foundation.

Other notable comics from this era include Woody Allen, Shelley Berman, Phyllis Diller, and Bob Newhart. Some Black American comedians such as George Kirby, Bill Cosby, Flip Wilson, Godfrey Cambridge, and Dick Gregory began exploring the criticism of "history and myth" in the 1950s–60s, with Redd Foxx testing the boundaries of "uncensored racial humor".

In the 1970s, several entertainers became major stars based on stand-up comedy performances. Richard Pryor and George Carlin followed Lenny Bruce's acerbic style to become icons. Stand-up expanded from clubs, resorts, and coffee houses into major concerts in sports arenas and amphitheaters. Steve Martin and Andy Kaufman were the most popular practitioners of anti-comedy from the 1970s into the 1980s. The older style of stand-up comedy (no social satire) was kept alive by Rodney Dangerfield and Buddy Hackett, who enjoyed revived careers late in life. Don Rickles, whose legendary style of relentless merciless attacks on both fellow performers and audience members alike kept him a fixture on TV and in Vegas from the 1960s all the way to the 2000s, when he appeared in the wildly popular Pixar Toy Story films as Mr. Potato Head, whom Rickles gave his grouchy onstage mannerisms. Television programs such as Saturday Night Live and The Tonight Show helped publicize the careers of other stand-up comedians, including Janeane Garofalo, Bill Maher and Jay Leno.

In the 1980s, Eddie Murphy shaped African American comedy when he created the Black Pack: similar to the Rat Pack, it was a group of stand-up comedians, its members included Paul Mooney, who wrote for Richard Pryor and later starred on Chappelle's Show.

From the 1970s to the '90s, different styles of comedy began to emerge, from the madcap stylings of Robin Williams, to the odd observations of Jerry Seinfeld and Ellen DeGeneres, the ironic musings of Steven Wright, to the mimicry of Whoopi Goldberg and Eddie Murphy. These comedians would serve to influence the next generation of comedians.

Following the height of the 1980s stand-up comedy boom, there was a 1990s comedy bust.

The Aristocrats is a 2005 film based on the original vaudeville joke The Aristocrats, where comedians tell their version of the dirty joke.

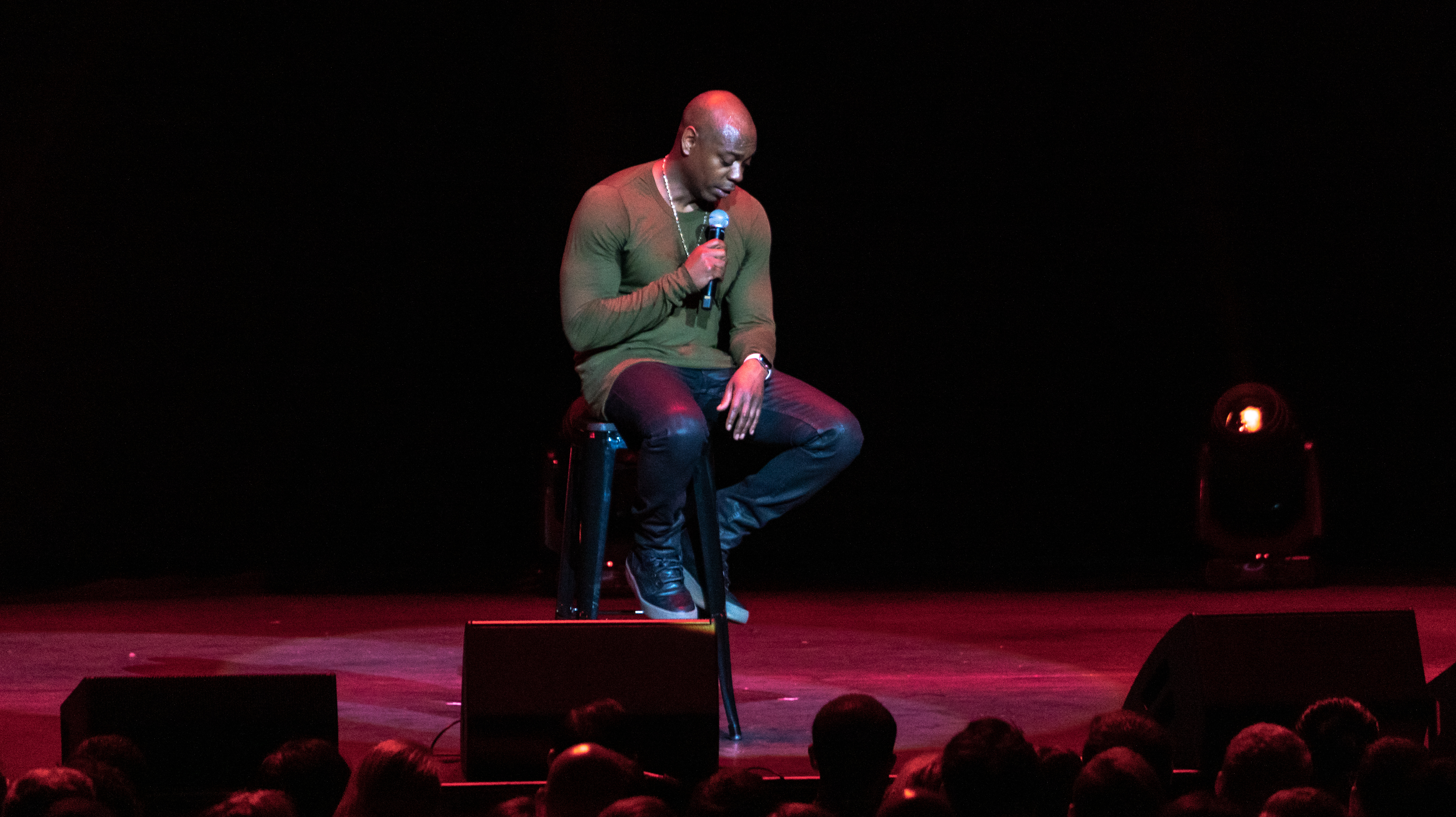
Dave Chappelle, performing stand-up in 2018

Official recognition of present-day stand-up comedians comes from the Mark Twain Prize for American Humor, the New York Friars Club roasts, and The Andy Kaufman Award.

The oldest stand-up comic seems to be Herbert Falk, born May 30, 1921, who performed at the Laughing Skull Comedy club in Atlanta when he was 99 yrs old on Jan 23, 2020. He later performed at the Helium Club in Buffalo, New York, on December 8, 2021 at 100 yrs old. His laughing skull routine can be viewed here . By stroke of fortune, he skirted death in WWII, volunteering to remove land mines under fire, only to be happier delivering stand-up 77 years later. He died January 2022 at 100 years old. His obituary can be found here.

== Germany ==
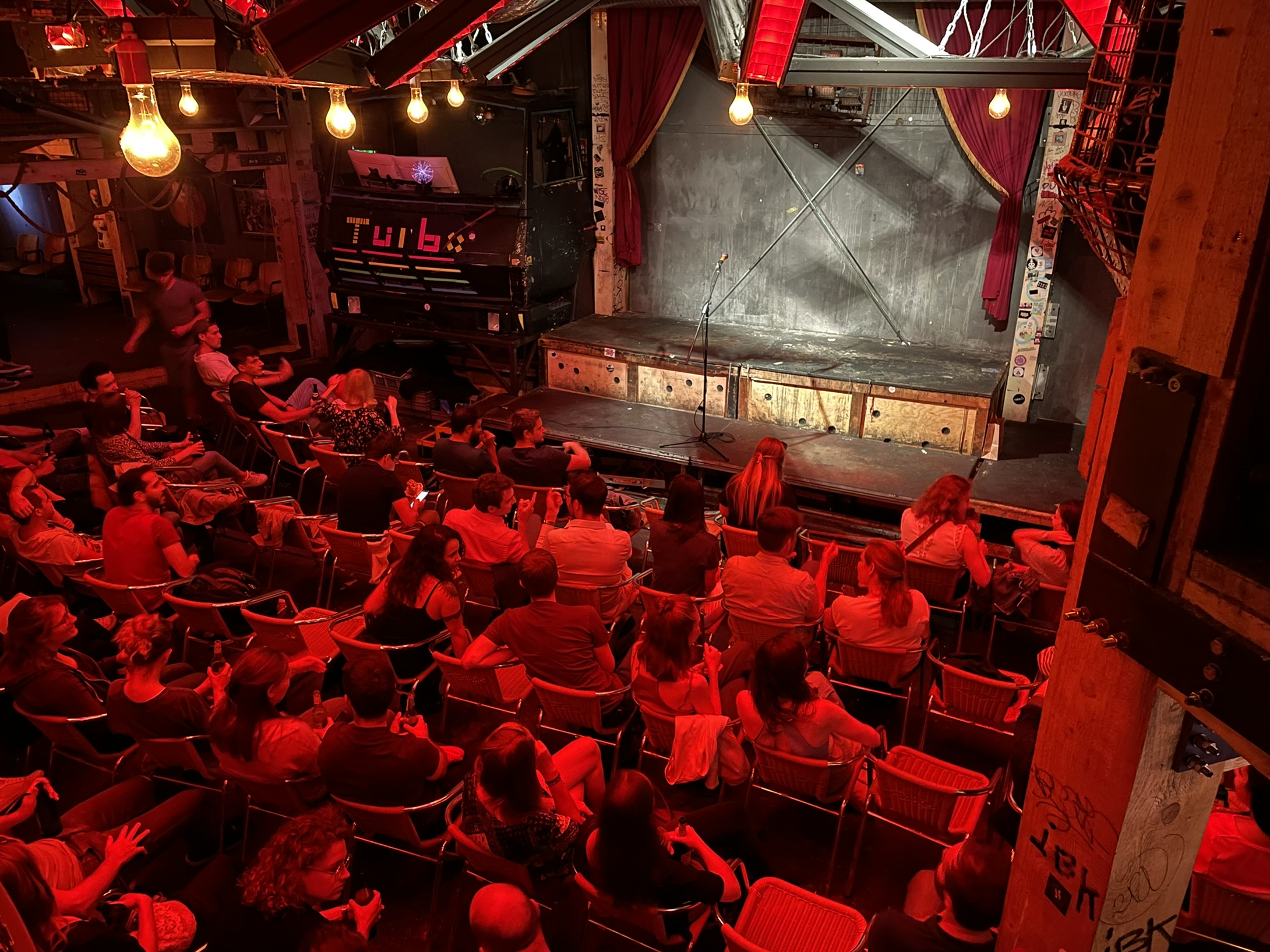
Entgleist Mixed Comedy Show at Bahnwärter Thiel Munich

Germany developed its stand-up culture in the 1990s, with a growing trend. Among the early pioneers of the later German comedy scene can be counted Loriot, Heinz Erhardt, Otto Waalkes, Dieter Hallervorden or Karl Dall.

Stand up comedy is also performed in several German cities. Berlin has comedy clubs including the Mad-Monkey Room, which opened in 2017. Munich also hosts German and English language open mic shows.

== Britain and Ireland ==
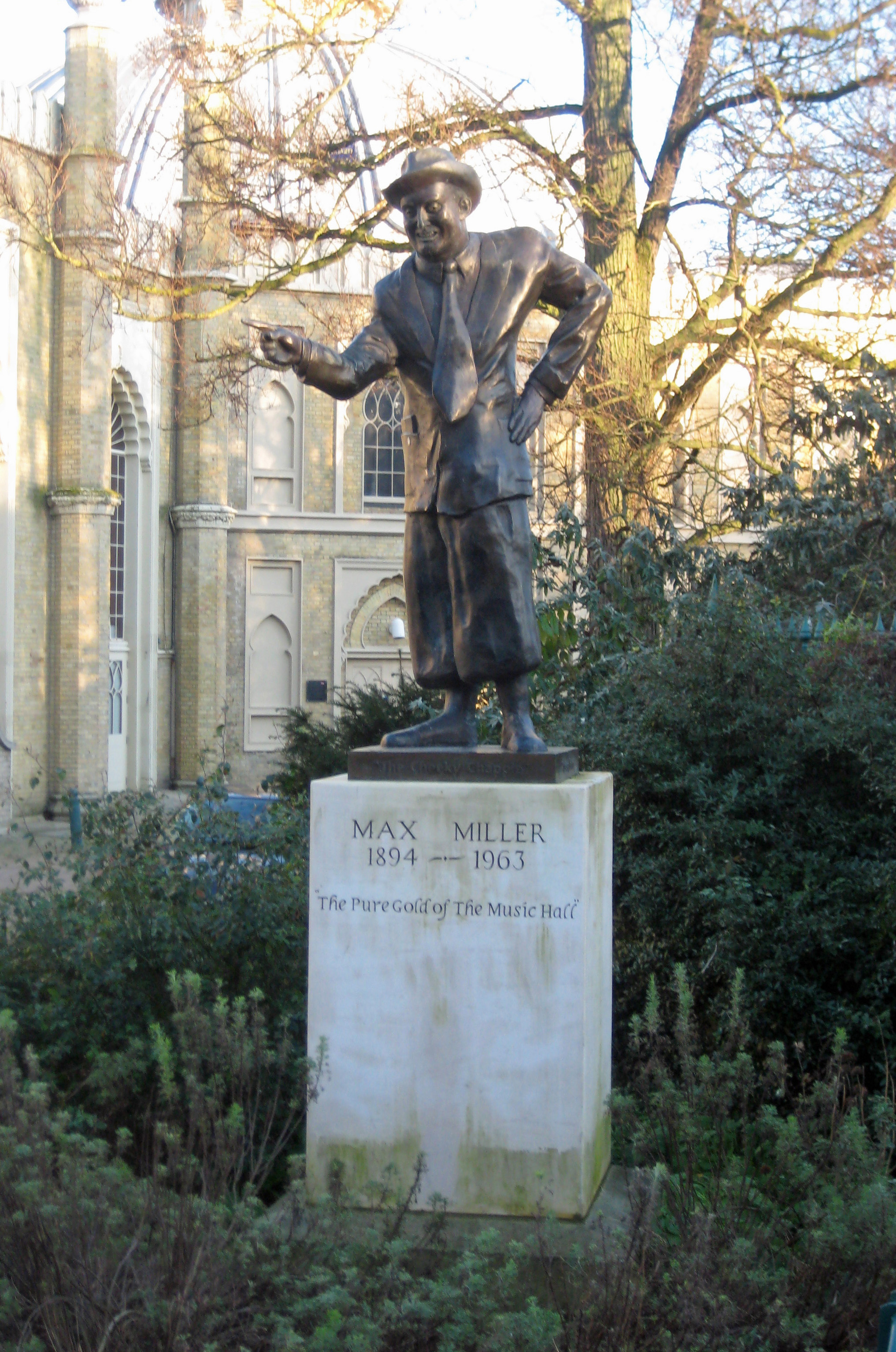
Bronze statue of Britain's Max Miller

Early twentieth-century front-cloth comics started in music halls, paving the way for stand-up comedy in Great Britain. Notable front-cloth comics who rose through the variety theatre circuit were Morecambe and Wise, Arthur Askey, Ken Dodd and Max Miller. Until 1968, the heavy censorship regime of the Lord Chamberlain's Office required all comedians to submit their acts for censorship. The act would be returned with unacceptable sections underlined in blue pencil (possibly giving rise to the term "blue" for a comedian whose act is considered bawdy or smutty). The comedian was then obliged not to deviate from the act in its edited form.

The rise of the post-war comedians coincided with the rise of television and radio, and the traditional music hall circuit suffered greatly as a result. By the 1970s, music hall entertainment was virtually dead. Alternative circuits had evolved, such as working men's clubs. Some of the more successful comedians on the working men's club circuit—including Bernard Manning, Bobby Thompson, Frank Carson and Stan Boardman—eventually made their way to television via such shows as The Wheeltappers and Shunters Social Club. The "alternative" comedy scene also began to evolve. Some of the earliest successes came from folk clubs, where performers such as Billy Connolly, Mike Harding and Jasper Carrott started as relatively straight musical acts whose between-song banter developed into complete comedy routines. The 1960s had also seen the satire boom, including the creation of the club, the Establishment, which, amongst other things, gave British audiences their first taste of extreme American stand-up comedy from Lenny Bruce. Victoria Wood launched her stand-up career in the early 1980s, which included observational conversation mixed with comedy songs. Wood was to become one of the country's most successful comedians, in 2001 selling out the Royal Albert Hall for 15 nights in a row.

In 1979, the first American-style stand-up comedy club, the Comedy Store was opened in London by Peter Rosengard, where many alternative comedy stars of the 1980s, such as Dawn French and Jennifer Saunders, Alexei Sayle, Craig Ferguson, Rik Mayall and Ade Edmondson began their careers. The stand-up comedy circuit rapidly expanded from London across the UK. The present British stand-up comedy circuit arose from the 'alternative' comedy revolution of the 1980s, with political and observational humor being the prominent styles to flourish. In 1983, young drama teacher Maria Kempinska created Jongleurs Comedy Clubs before it closed in 2017. Stand-up comedy is believed to have been performed originally as a one-man show. Lately, this type of show started to involve a group of young comedians, especially in Europe.

== Mexico ==
In terms of live comedy in Mexico, the predecessors of this comic style are:

- The Tepichines are a comic duo who were predecessors of a style consisting of parodies and double senses with creativity
- Miguel Galván (1957–2008) Originally from Juan Aldama, Zacatecas. He dropped out of architecture at the Universidad del Valle de México to take theater classes at the "Dimitrio Sarrás Actors Studio" for three years.
- Mara Escalante, is an actress, comedian and Mexican singer. She is known for the television series María de Todos los Ángeles, in which she has two characters, including the protagonist. She began her career in the mid-1990s.
- Polo Polo (1944-), whose routines are characterized by a high content of sexual references, with a touch of misogyny, relayed as a personal anecdote.
- Adal Ramones (1961-) was one of the first to transport the genre to Mexico from his nocturnal program, using the comic monologue.
- Evelio with V Chica (Evelio Arias Ramos, 1966–2008).
- Eugenio Derbez

The new generation of comedians decided to use their own lives as the theme of their comedy, imitating the American style:

- Héctor Suárez Gomís, son of Mexican comedian Héctor Suárez, is currently the host of the Latin American version of the comedy program Stand Up Comedy Central Presents, broadcast by Comedy Central from 2011 until 2014.
- Adal Ramones since 2013 leads the program called STANDparados broadcast by Comedy District before Classic TV.
- Kikis, (1980) comedian since late 2011, openly lesbian, has participated in Comedy Central Latin America as well as with Adal Ramones in STANDparados Comedy District.
- Luiki Wiki (1985-) began making comedy in January 2013 in Mexico City and later moved to Monterrey NL to start the first Open Mic in Monterrey (an event in which comedians can participate to try out new material with a real audience) together with other comedians of the genre. Later they created the first collective of comedy in Monterrey called For Laughter Standup Comedy. Luiki Wiki has participated in programs such as Es de Noche and I already arrived with René Franco and as with Adal Ramones in the 3rd season of the STANDparados program aired by Comedy District.
- Franco Escamilla (1981–) Comedian, musician, radio announcer and founder of "La Diablo Squad". He is mainly known for his comedy shows, has performed throughout the Mexican Republic and Latin America, even starting his own "World Tour", arriving to have confirmed performances in Europe and the United States, including trips to Japan and Australia. Currently known as the largest representative of stand-up comedy in this country.
- Hugo "El Cojo Felíz" (1988-), is a comedian, radio announcer, part of the devil Squad, has the radio program "La Hora Felíz" with the "Uncle Rober" and is considered the best pen in Mexico.
- Roberto Andrade Cerón the "Uncle Rober" (1979-) is a comedian, writer, radio announcer and has "La Cojo Feliz" the radio program "La Hora Felíz".
- Daniel Sosa
- Jose Luis Slobotzky
- Ricardo Perez
- Alex Fernandez
- Sofía Niño de Rivera
- Mauricio Nieto

== Brazil ==
The one-man-show genre, which is similar, but allows other approaches (enacting characters, songs and scenes) was introduced in Brazil by José Vasconcellos in the 60's. Taking a step closer to the North American format, Chico Anysio and Jô Soares maintained the format - specially in their live nation-wide talks shows, and generally, in the opening monologues - bringing to Brazil a genre more similar to what is currently known as Stand-up.

Stand-up began to be interesting news in 2005 in São Paulo, when the first club was created, called Clube de Comédia Stand-Up: composed of Marcelo Mansfield, Rafinha Bastos, Oscar Filho, Marcela Leal and Márcio Ribeiro. In São Paulo the comedy club would present in Beverly Hills, the traditional comedy venue in Moema. Shortly afterwards it migrated to Mr. Blues and Bleeker Street, in Vila Madalena. In Rio de Janeiro, Comédia em Pé, (Comedy Standing Up): composed of Cláudio Torres Gonzaga, Fábio Porchat, Fernando Caruso and Paulo Carvalho, had its debue at the venue Rio Design Leblon. These were the first stand-up performances in the country.

In 2006, the comic Jô Soares watched Clube de Comédia in São Paulo and invited the comic Diogo Portugal for an interview in his talk show. That was a definitive moment to call attention towards the genre. He mentioned many different shows that he was a part of and attracted the public attention and media coverage to the bars that held these presentations. In Curitiba, with this momentum, many other stand-up nights began opening up. In São Paulo, Danilo Gentili, that had just become a part of Clube da Comédia, invited Mário Ribeiro and gathered other young comics that were frequent spectators at the club, to create Comédia Ao Vivo (Live Comedy): composed of Dani Calabresa, Luiz França, Fábio Rabin.

In 2008, the program Custe o Que Custar began airing on TV Bandeirantes. Featuring established names such as Danilo Gentili, Rafinha Bastos and Oscar Filho, the show contributed to popularization of the genre in Brazil.

Following CQC's example many channels and TV shows on Brazil's national television invested in Stand-up comedy. After this many other groups gained recognition in the clubs and live performances around the two biggest cities of Brazil.

== Spain ==
Although the origins of this genre can be traced back to the monologues of Miguel Gila in the 1950s, the rise of live comedy in Spain took a long time in comparison with the American continent. The first generalized relationship with this comic genre occurred in 1999 with the creation of the Paramount Comedy channel, which included the New Comics program as one of its flagship programs, where monologuists such as Ángel Martín, José Juan Vaquero, David Broncano, and Joaquín Reyes stood out.

Also, in 1999 began the journey of the program The club of comedy, an open adaptation of the popular comic format. In its first stage (1999–2005), it underwent several chain changes and released comedians like Luis Piedrahita, Alexis Valdes or Goyo Jiménez. In its new stage, starting in 2011 in La Sexta and presented by Eva Hache, it tries to start in the genre of comic monologue media characters from different artistic fields such as: Imanol Arias, José Luis Gil, Isabel Ordaz and Santiago Segura.

Special mention deserves the Buenafuente program, started in 2005. The presenter, Andreu Buenafuente, made an initial monologue of about 9 to 11 minutes where he links current issues with everyday humorous situations. This became the most famous part of the program and made him one of the most recognized comedians in Spain, for his connection with the public and his ability to improvise.

On the other hand, the comedian Ignatius Farray became one of the most representative icons of this genre today.

== India ==
Modern stand-up comedy in India is a young art form, however Chakyar koothu was prominent in Trivandrum and southern Kerala during the 16th and 17th centuries. It had all the attributes of modern stand-up comedy and is widely considered to be the oldest known staged comedy act anywhere in the world.

Even though the history of live comedy performances in India traces its early roots back to 1950s, when P.L.Deshpande and P K Atre,(marath writer) was well known for their stand-up comedy.

In 1986, India's Johnny Lever performed in a charity show called "Hope 86", in front of the whole Hindi film industry as a filler and was well received by the audience. His talent was recognized, and he would later be described as "the iconic comedian of his generation".

It was not until 2005, when the TV show The Great Indian Laughter Challenge garnered huge popularity and stand-up comedy in itself started getting recognised. Thus, a lot more comedians became popular and started performing various live and TV shows. The demand for comedy content continues to increase. Some popular comedians around 2005-2008 include Raju Srivastav and Kapil Sharma. Most of them performed their acts in Hindi.

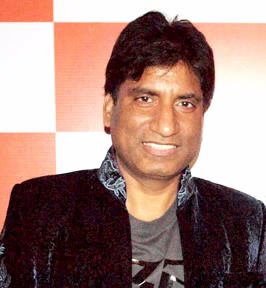
New generation stand-up comedian Raju Srivastav in 2012

Raju Srivastav first appeared on the comedy talent show The Great Indian Laughter Challenge. He finished as second runner-up and then took part in the spin-off, The Great Indian Laughter Challenge — Champions, in which he won the title of "The King of Comedy". Srivastava was a participant on season 3 of Bigg Boss. He has participated in the comedy show Comedy Ka Maha Muqabla.

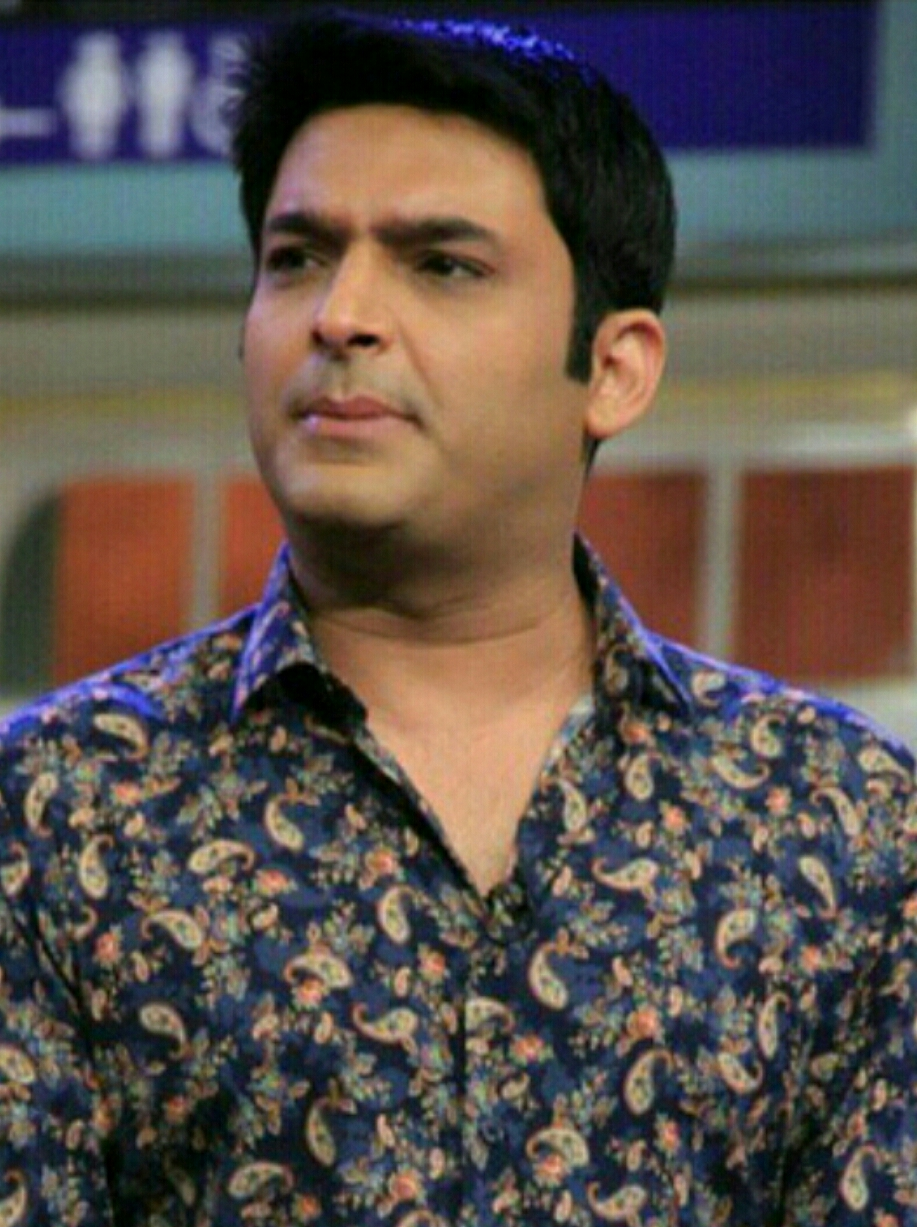
Kapil Sharma, an Indian stand-up comedian, known for comedy nights with Kapil

Kapil Sharma is ranked no. 3 at the most admired Indian personality list by The Economic Times in 2015. Currently he is hosting the most popular Indian comedy show "The Kapil Sharma Show" after "Comedy Nights with Kapil". Sharma had been working in the comedy show Hasde Hasande Raho on MH One, until he got his first break in The Great Indian Laughter Challenge, one of the nine reality television shows he has won. He became the winner of the show in 2007 for which he won 10 lakhs as prize money.

Sharma participated in Sony Entertainment Television's Comedy Circus. He became the winner of all six seasons of "Comedy Circus" he participated in. He has hosted dance reality show Jhalak Dikhhla Jaa Season 6 and also hosted comedy show Chhote Miyan. Sharma also participated in the show Ustaadon Ka Ustaad.

Around 2008–2009, two other popular comedians Papa CJ and Vir Das returned to India and started making their marks on Indian comedy scene. Both of them were exposed to UK and US comedy routines and they performed mostly in English. At the same time, a few more youngsters got inspired and started taking plunge into stand-up comedy.

Since 2011, the stand-up comedy has been getting substantial appreciation. The Comedy Store from London opened an outlet in Mumbai's Palladium Mall where people would regularly enjoy comedians from UK. The Comedy Story also supported local comedians and helped them grow. This outlet eventually became Canvas Laugh Club in Mumbai.

Around 2011, people started organizing different comedy open mic events in Mumbai, Delhi (and Gurgaon), Bangalore. All of this happened in association with growth of a counterculture in Indian cities which catered to the appetite of younger generations for live events for comedy, poetry, storytelling, and music. Various stand-up events were covered by news such as channels such NDTV / Aaj Tak etc. and were appreciated by millions of viewers.

As a result of these developments, plus the increasing penetration of YouTube (along with Internet/World Wide Web), Indian stand-up comedy started reaching further masses. While the established comedians such as Vir Das, Papa CJ were independently growing through various corporate / international performances, other comedians such as Vipul Goyal, Biswa Kalyan Rath, Kenny Sebastian, Atul Khatri, Kanan Gill, Kunal Kamra, Anubhav Singh Bassi, Tanmay Bhat, Zakir Khan, Abhishek Upmanyu, Samay Raina grew popular through YouTube videos, where they posted clips of their live comedy shows. Some of the most famous organizations which popularized stand-up comedy were All India Bakchod, East India Comedy, The Viral Fever and most recently, India's Got Latent.

The industry, still in its intermediate stages, now sees a lot more influx of aspiring comedians as it transforms the ecosystem around it, while also battling the censorship laws of India, which Indian comedians have came across a lot during their careers.
