= Dil Ko Rafu Karr Lei =

2024 Indian drama series

- Genre: Melodrama; Romance; Drama
- Created by: Ravi Dubey; Sargun Mehta
- Written by: Varsha Manocha; Minakshi Gupta
- Directed by: Ajay Bhuyan
- Creative directors: Rohit Anand; Shweta Mishra
- Starring: Ayesha Khan; Karan Grover; Enakshi Ganguly; Rupinder Rupi; Komal Sharma
- Theme music composer: Ravi Dubey; Kevin Roy; Himanshu Kohli
- Opening theme: "Dil Ko Rafu Karr Lei" by Himanshu Kohli
- Ending theme: "Dil Ko Rafu Karr Lei" by Himanshu Kohli
- Country of origin: India
- Original language: Hindi
- No. of seasons: 1
- No. of episodes: 39

Production
- Executive producers: Srman Jain; Preet Rajput
- Producers: Ravi Dubey; Sargun Mehta
- Editors: Dharmesh Patel; Shadab Khan
- Camera setup: Multi-camera
- Running time: 22–38 minutes
- Production company: Dreamiyata Entertainment

Original release
- Network: YouTube
- Release: 25 December 2024 – 7 May 2025

Dil Ko Rafu Karr Lei is an Indian Hindi-language television drama series which aired from 25 December 2024 to 7 May 2025 on YouTube. Produced by Ravi Dubey and Sargun Mehta, it stars Ayesha Khan, and Karan V Grover.

== Plot ==
Ishan, a pragmatic and ambitious man, and Nikki, a free-spirited dreamer with her own set of values and desires. Will their potential relationship be overwhelmed by the weight of clashing beliefs, unresolved expectations, and unspoken resentments ? Will they find the common ground & courage to pick up the threads and mend what’s broken?

== Cast ==
=== Main ===
- Karan Grover as Ishaan
- Ayesha Khan as Nikki

=== Recurring ===
- Nirman Rishi as Ishan Dadi
- Chirag Khatri as Akshay
- Kirti Choudhary as Reema
- Kamal Dadalia as Nikki's mother
- Swati Tarar as Nikki's mami
- Tavish Gupta as Mintu
- Lokesh as Inder
- Enakshi Ganguly as Preeti
- Preet Kaur as Seema
- Rupinder Rupi as Mama
- Gunabi Maan as Binno
- Komal Sharma as Naina
- Ganni Shergil as Sanjiv
- Gurjit Channi as ACP Kapil

== Production ==
=== Release ===
In December 2024, Ravi Dubey and Sargun Mehta announced a new series titled Dil Ko Rafu Karr Lei.

=== Casting ===
Ayesha Khan to play female lead, Nikki. Karan V Grover was signed to play Ishan.

== Soundtrack ==
Title	Singer	Lyrics	Label
"Dil Ko Rafu Karr Lei"	Himanshu Kohli	Himanshu Kohli, Minakshi Gupta	Dreamiyata Music
"Gediyann Na Marr Ve"	Simran Choudhary, Navi Sran	Happy Raikoti	Dreamiyata Music

Main theme song
