= Chandan Prabhakar =

Indian comedian and actor (born 1981)

- Born: 29 September 1981 (age 45); Amritsar, Punjab, India
- Occupations: Comedian; actor
- Years active: 2007-present
- Spouse: Nandini Tandon (m. 2015)
- Children: 1

Chandan Prabhakar (born 29 September 1981), often informally referred to as Chandu, is an Indian comedian and actor.

== Life and career ==
Chandan completed his graduation in mechanical engineering from Hindu College in Amritsar. He has been married to Nandini Tandon since 2015, they have one child together. He is childhood friend with Kapil Sharma and have worked together in The Great Indian Laughter Challenge, Comedy Nights with Kapil and The Kapil Sharma Show. His most popular characters is Chandu chaiwala.

He first started his career as a contestant in comedy show The Great Indian Laughter Challenge in 2007, in which he emerged as runner up. Then in 2010, he appeared in his fellow comedian Sunil Pal directorial Bhavnao Ko Samjho. After then he appeared in three Punjabi language films, Power Cut (2011), Disco Singh (2014) and Judge Singh LLB (2015). In the last one, he co-produced and co-wrote screenplay. While reviewing Judge Singh LLB, The Guardian wrote Judge Singh LLB as scrappy, winning slacker comedy. Jasmine Singh of The Tribune reviewed film as the one definitely a bail-out from the usual storylines. ABP Sanjha reviewed film as a good courtroom drama in pollywood.

In 2013, he appeared in some episodes of Comedy Circus Ke Ajoobe. He achieved recognition while appearing regularly in his friend Kapil Sharma shows like Comedy Nights with Kapil, The Kapil Sharma Show and Family Time With Kapil Sharma.

In 2014, Chandan Prabhakar Judged the finale of the show 'Laughter Da Master', aired on PTC Punjabi. He also worked as the content writer of the show.

In 2025, Chandan Prabhakar competed on Celebrity MasterChef India and was eliminated in 12th position.

== Filmography ==
=== Films ===
Year	Title	Role	Notes
2010	Bhavnao Ko Samjho	Thakur's son 2	
2011	Power Cut	Lineman	Punjabi film
2014	Disco Singh	Detective Pradyuman Sharma	Punjabi film
2015	Judge Singh LLB	Advocate Vijay Soni	Punjabi film; Also producer and screenwriter

=== Television ===
Year	Title	Role	Notes
2007	The Great Indian Laughter Challenge	Self	
2013	Comedy Circus Ke Ajoobe	Various	5 episodes
2013-2016	Comedy Nights with Kapil	Various	
2016-2022	The Kapil Sharma Show	Various	
2018	Comedy Circus	Himself	1 episode
2018	Family Time With Kapil Sharma	Chandan	
2018	Kaun Banega Crorepati	Himself	1 episode
2025	Celebrity MasterChef India	Contestant; 12th Place	10 episodes
2026 –	Maa Hai Na	Himself	
