= Sai Lokur =

Indian actress (born 1989)

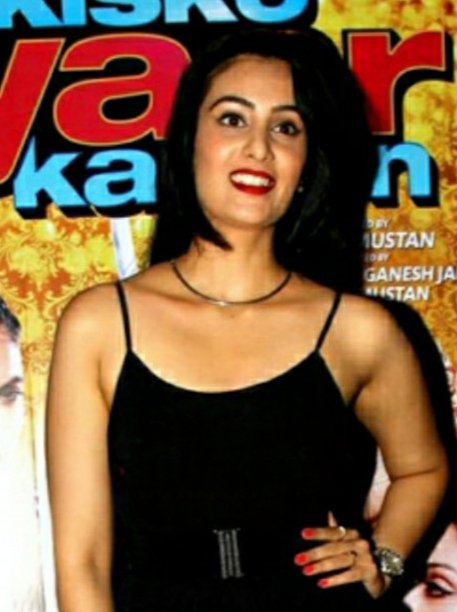
- Lokur at launch of Kis Kisko Pyaar Karoon
- Born: 5 September 1989 (age 36); Belgaum, Karnataka, India
- Other name: Sai Lokur-Roy
- Occupation: Actress
- Years active: 2002—2022
- Known for: Bigg Boss Marathi 1 Kis Kisko Pyaar Karoon
- Spouse: Tirthadeep Roy (m. 2020)

Sai Lokur (born 5 September 1989) is an Indian actress. She made her debut with the Hindi movie Kuch Tum Kaho Kuch Hum Kahein as a child artist. She was seen in Kis Kisko Pyaar Karoon alongside Kapil Sharma. She appeared in Bigg Boss Marathi 1 as a contestant and made it in top 5 finalists.

== Personal life ==
The actress married IT professional Tirthadeep Roy on 30 November 2020.

== Filmography ==
Year	Movie	Role	Language
2002	Kuch Tum Kaho Kuch Hum Kahein	Child artist	Hindi
2002	Pakda Gaya	Child artist	Hindi
2007	Mission Champion	Child artist	Marathi
2011	PPlatform		Marathi
2011	Parambi		Marathi
2012	Aamhich Tumche Bajirao		Marathi
2012	No Entry Pudhe Dhoka Aahey	Pooja	Marathi
2013	Jarab	Kavya	Marathi
2013	Mee Ani You	Ira Kurundkar	Marathi
2015	Kis Kisko Pyaar Karoon	Anjali Ram Punj	Hindi

== Television ==
Year	Name	Notes	Ref.
2018	Bigg Boss Marathi 1	Contestant (3rd runner up)	
2018	Assal Pahune Irsaal Namune	For Women's Day Special	
2019	Ekdam Kadak	Ex-Finalist of Bigg Boss	
2019	Bigg Boss Marathi 2	As a Guest in BB Hotel Task	

== Web series ==
Year	Series	Role	Ref.
2020	Sanam Hotline	Shivani	
