= Kis Kisko Pyaar Karoon 2 =

2025 Indian film by Anukalp Goswami

- Theatrical release poster
- Directed by: Anukalp Goswami
- Written by: Anukalp Goswami
- Produced by: Abbas–Mustan; Ganesh Jain; Ratan Jain
- Starring: Kapil Sharma; Manjot Singh; Hira Warina; Tridha Choudhury; Parul Gulati; Ayesha Khan
- Cinematography: Ravi Yadav
- Edited by: Hussain Burmawalla
- Music by: Yo Yo Honey Singh digV; Yug Bhusal; Parikshit Sharma; Nishad Chandra
- Production companies: Star Studio18; Venus Worldwide Entertainment; Abbas Mustan Films Production
- Distributed by: Star Studio18
- Release date: 12 December 2025
- Running time: 142 minutes
- Country: India
- Language: Hindi
- Budget: ₹35 crore
- Box office: est. ₹14.87 crore

Kis Kisko Pyaar Karoon 2 (transl. Who-whom should I love 2) is a 2025 Indian Hindi-language comedy drama film written and directed by Anukalp Goswami. Produced under Abbas–Mustan Films Production Pvt. Ltd., Venus Records & Tapes and Star Studio18, the film stars Kapil Sharma, Manjot Singh, Hira Warina, Tridha Choudhury, Parul Gulati and Ayesha Khan. It is a spiritual sequel to Kis Kisko Pyaar Karoon (2015). This is also the first of several posthumous releases of Asrani, who died two months earlier, in October 2025.

== Plot ==
Mohan, a Hindu, and Saniya, a Muslim, want to marry each other, but their parents have arranged their marriages within their religions. On Saniya's Nikah day, Mohan disguises himself as a Muslim and as her groom, Mehmood, but is surprised to know Saniya has also staged her cousin, Roohi, as a bride because she has run away. The same night, Mohan is abducted and wakes up in his bed with Meera, surprised to know that his parents have arranged Saptapadi while he was unconscious. He has to accept both wives individually because otherwise, both had threatened to commit suicide.

One day, Saniya calls Mohan to marry in a collective wedding at a church in Goa, disguised as Christians. His both wives also wanted a honeymoon. To his surprise, both appear together at the church, and he hides with a third girl – Jenny, a Christian, whom he gives a mouth-to-mouth resuscitation as she had fainted after getting rejected by her groom-to-be. Though, Jenny revives and exhanges vows with Mohan where his name is called Michael. Mohan shares his confusions to a priest, who instead starts doubting his intentions.

Now back in Bhopal where Mohan runs a restaurant, Roohi is living with Saniya's parents and Meera with Mohan's parents, while Jenny is kept at a new household where her brother, Inspector David, also appears. David is on a mission to search for a man with four planned weddings in different religions, following a complaint filed by the priest – not knowing it was Mohan. It is up to Mohan's friend, Hubby, to keep all the families away and unaware of each other, during which Hubby himself becomes the target of Santosh, an NGO worker having a vision to save girls from the deceiving men. David gets another complaint by Santosh, doubting Hubby's intentions.

One day, Mohan barely manages to attend all; Durga Puja with Meera without eating a Prasada and Jenny's birthday party by delaying the cake-cutting, only because he has kept a Roza with Roohi. On India's Republic Day, Roohi attends a function of her younger cousin in a school where Meera is a teacher, while Jenny comes to organize a medical camp. They meet each other, not knowing their husband is the same, thus Mohan has to donate blood thrice, where the receptionist notes his identity and tries exposing Mohan on stage. Instead, Mohan delivers a religious and patriotic speech to cover himself against the humiliation. There, Mohan rediscovers Saniya but in a Sikh outfit.

Upon investigating, it is revealed that Saniya was kidnapped from Goa's church by her arranged fiancé, the real Mehmood, and has lost her memory. She was saved by a Sikh landlord. To marry Saniya, Mohan disguises himself as Manjeet, a Sikh, and runs away from his three wives. Meanwhile, the receptionist files a final complaint with David, who has just arrested Mehmood. David gathers the three girls and parents to reveal Mohan's true identity. They break into the wedding at a Gurdwara by obtaining a forced tip from Hubby, and beat up Mohan before he could have a fourth marriage with Saniya.

Hubby comes in Mohan's defense, and shares that he was unwillingly staged into the previous three marriages or else the girls would have died in pain – Roohi is a two-time divorcee, Meera is his father's arranged bride, and Jenny is a stress patient. Mohan accepts that he has always tried to balance his role among all while trying to find his true love, Saniya, and that he prefers love over any religion. During the chaos, Saniya's memories revive. All four girls confess for Mohan and accept each other before he faints away while marrying Saniya.

In the hospital, Mohan's mother arranges and introduces his fifth wife, Ginni, but this time, he attempts an escape from her Varmala.

== Cast ==
- Kapil Sharma as Mohan Sharma/Mehmood/Michael/Manjit
- Manjot Singh as Harbir "Hubby" Singh
- Hira Warina as Saniya Hussain
- Tridha Choudhury as Meera
- Parul Gulati as Jenny
- Ayesha Khan as Roohi
- Sushant Singh as DCP David D'costa, Jenny's Brother
- Vipin Sharma as Mirza, Saniya's Father
- Akhilendra Mishra as BK, Mohan's Father
- Smita Jaykar as Zeenat, Saniya's Mother
- Supriya Shukla as Mamta, Mohan's Mother
- Jamie Lever as Santosh
- Jimmy Moses as Eunuch Head
- Yashpal Sharma as Engineer Baba
- Asrani as Father Anthony
- Anil Charanjeett as Mahmood
- Shrikant Verma as PT teacher
- Aarav Jain as Rizwan
- Trupti Khamkar as Pushpa
- Sumit Arora as Taxi Driver
- Ginni Kapil Sharma as Ginni (cameo appearance)

== Production ==
In August 2024, the film was announced with Kapil Sharma in the lead role.

Principal photography began in January 2025 and was completed in March 2025. The film was shot in Mumbai and Bhopal for 45 days. In July 2025, the track Phurr was shot in Dubai.

== Soundtrack ==
Kis Kisko Pyaar Karoon 2

Soundtrack album by Yo Yo Honey Singh, digV, Yug Bhusal, Parikshit Sharma and Nishad Chandra
- Released: 14 December 2025
- Genre: Feature film soundtrack
- Length: 14:27
- Language: Hindi
- Label: Ishtar Music

The soundtrack for Kis Kisko Pyaar Karoon 2 was composed by Yo Yo Honey Singh, digV, Yug Bhusal, Parikshit Sharma and Nishad Chandra.

Track listing
| No. | Title | Lyrics | Music | Singer(s) | Length |
|---|---|---|---|---|---|
| 1. | "Phurr" | Raj Brar | Yo Yo Honey Singh | Yo Yo Honey Singh, Josh Brar | 03:15 |
| 2. | "Ranjhe Nu Heer" | Lavraj | DigV | Jubin Nautiyal | 03:47 |
| 3. | "Aaja Hulchal Karenge" | Ajay Kumar | Yug Bhusal | Afsana Khan | 04:08 |
| 4. | "Har Safar Mein" | Vimal Kashyap | Parikshit Sharma, Nishad Chandra | Sonu Nigam | 03:17 |
| Total length: | | | | | 14:27 |

== Release ==
Kis Kisko Pyaar Karoon 2 was released theatrically on 12 December 2025.

=== Home media ===
The film's digital streaming rights were acquired by JioHotstar.

== Reception ==
Rishabh Suri from Hindustan Times gave the film 2.5 out of 5 stars and said "Overall, Kis Kis Ko Pyaar Karoon 2 is content to play within its comfort zone. It offers a handful of entertaining moments and a game cast, yet the stretched runtime keeps it from landing as confidently as it should". Syed Firdaus Ashraf of Rediff rated the film 4 stars out of 5 and observed that "Kis Kisko Pyaar Karoon 2 may be a comedy filled with chaos, but in its indirect way, it speaks about a time when the Constitution mattered more than one's religion and when the idea of India was larger than personal hate." Shreyas Pande from The Hindu and wrote that "the film is a surprising blend of over-the-top gags, which quietly accentuate its progressive themes".

Deepa Gahlot writing for the Scroll.in commented that "Unfortunately, the film is dated and ludicrous. There is a modicum of satire, like a spark in the gloom. Shilajit Mitra of The Hollywood Reporter observed that "Kapil Sharma is once again a man with many wives in this belated sequel; it's satire meets fantasy meets low comedy." Bollywood Hungama rated it 3.5/5 stars and said that "On the whole, KIS KISKO PYAAR KAROON 2 is a light-hearted, massy laugh-riot that fondly evokes the madcap comedies of the 90s. It’s neither groundbreaking nor flawless, but the gags land more often than not, Kapil Sharma is in top form, and the clean, family-friendly humour gives it a clear identity."
