= Mukhachitram =

Telugu language movie

- Release poster
- Directed by: Gangadhar
- Written by: Sandeep Raj
- Starring: Vikas Vasista; Priya Vadlamani; Ayesha Khan; Chaitanya Rao Madadi
- Cinematography: Sreenivas Bejugam
- Edited by: Kodati Pavan Kalyan
- Music by: Kaala Bhairava
- Production company: Pocket Money Pictures
- Release date: 9 December 2022
- Country: India
- Language: Telugu

Mukhachitram (transl. Face portrait) is a 2022 Indian Telugu-language action drama film directed by Gangadhar and written by Sandeep Raj. The film stars Vikas Vasista, Priya Vadlamani, Ayesha Khan, and Chaitanya Rao Madadi with Vishwak Sen in an extended cameo. The film released on 9 December 2022.

== Plot ==
Raj Kumar (Vikas Vasista) is a renowned plastic surgeon based in Hyderabad. He later marries Mahathi (Priya Vadlamani), a village girl whom he got to know via a marriage broker. However, his longtime friend Maya (Ayesha Khan) is not happy with this news. A flashback shows that Maya and Raj were in love during their school days. Later, Raj moved to the US with his parents, leaving Maya behind. Raj eventually forgot about the relationship and moved on, but Maya did not. Heartbroken, Maya still accepts reality.

One year after Raj and Mahathi's marriage, Mahathi becomes pregnant. Maya meets with an accident, which completely deforms her face. Her condition also desperately requires a blood donation, but she has a rare blood group that the hospital does not have in stock. Mahathi happens to have the same blood group, so she offers to donate blood. Before the donation, a nurse asks Mahathi if she is pregnant, as donating blood during pregnancy is harmful to her health and could weaken her. To save Maya, Mahathi lies, saying she is not pregnant, and donates her blood.

A few days later, Mahathi, while alone at home, faints and falls down the stairs, injuring her head. Raj rushes her to the hospital but cannot save her life. Heartbroken, Raj makes a bold decision—to transplant Mahathi's face onto Maya. After the surgery is completed, Raj tells Maya about the incident and requests that she act as Mahathi in front of Mahathi's family, so they would not learn about her death and be devastated. Maya fully takes over Mahathi's identity and begins living with Raj as his wife.

One day, when Raj is away, Maya finds Mahathi's phone. Out of curiosity, she unlocks it and checks its contents. She discovers several voice diaries recorded by Mahathi, which shockingly reveal that she had been abused and raped by Raj throughout their marriage. Outraged, Maya invites Raj's friend Satya (Chaitanya Rao Madadi) over, traps him, and threatens him with violence to uncover the truth about what happened between Mahathi and Raj. Satya reveals another shocking detail: when Mahathi once fought back against Raj's abuse, Raj's ego was hurt, and he decided to get rid of her. After Mahathi donated blood to Maya, Raj spiked her drink, causing her to faint and fall down the stairs.

Maya decides to seek justice for Mahathi. She installs a CCTV camera in the house and tells Raj that she wants to role-play, in which she says no to him but he would force himself on her. Raj agrees. During the role-play, Raj attempts to rape Maya, but she resists. The situation escalates into a fight, and Maya calls the police. Using the CCTV footage as evidence, Maya—who is pretending to be Mahathi—accuses Raj of months-long abuse and rape.

The case is soon brought to court but faces significant challenges, as marital rape is not recognized as rape in India. Maya's lawyer delivers an emotional and powerful speech in court, leading the judge to set a precedent by effectively criminalizing marital rape and sentencing Raj to 10 years in prison.

== Cast ==
- Vikas Vasista as Dr. Raj Kumar
- Priya Vadlamani as Mahathi
- Ayesha Khan as Maya Fernandez
- Chaitanya Rao Madadi as Dr. Satya
- Vishwak Sen as Lawyer Viswamitra (extended cameo appearance)
- P. Ravishankar as Lawyer Vashishta
- Sunil as Dr. Varma
- Sruthi Singampalli as Durgamattha, Mahathi's aunt and Viswamitra's mother
- Meer S as Raghuramaiah, Mahathi's father
- Bindu Chandramouli as Vashishta's wife
- Divya Narni as Sruthi, Maya's friend
- Rocket Raghava as Marriage broker
- Bramarambika Tutika as Viswamitra's assistant lawyer
- Harsh Roshan as young Raj Kumar
- Baby Divya as young Maya

== Reception ==
A critic from The Hindu wrote that "Mukhachitram makes a point about marital assault and the need to give the victim an empathetic hearing. If only it had been written, narrated and enacted better". Nelki Naresh Kumar for Hindustan Times rated 2.5 stars out of 5 stars and wrote "Ayesha Khan impresses with glamour. Vishvaksen guest-starred as a lawyer in the climax." Satya Pulagam for ABP News Telegu rated 2 stars of 5 stars and wrote "Chaitanya Rao's acting and dialogue delivery are good. His timing is laughable at times. Ayesha Khan stopped at the basics in acting. She still needs a lot of improvement. Ravi Shankar's voice helped with the role of a fire lawyer in acting."

== Home media ==
The streaming rights of the film were acquired by Aha where the film premiered on 3 February 2023.
