= Kis Kisko Pyaar Karoon =

2015 Indian film by Abbas–Mustan

- Theatrical release poster
- Directed by: Abbas–Mustan
- Written by: Anukalp Goswami; Dheeraj Sarna
- Story by: Anukalp Goswami
- Produced by: Ganesh Jain; Ratan Jain; Abbas–Mustan
- Starring: Kapil Sharma; Varun Sharma; Sai Lokur; Manjari Fadnis; Elli Avram; Simran Kaur Mundi; Arbaaz Khan
- Cinematography: V. A. Dilshad
- Edited by: Hussain A. Burmawalla
- Music by: Songs: Tanishk Bagchi; Dr. Zeus; Javed - Mohsin; Amjad-Nadeem; Background Score: Salil Amrute
- Production companies: Venus Records & Tapes; United Seven; Abbas-Mustan Films Production Pvt. Ltd.
- Distributed by: Pooja Entertainment
- Release date: 25 September 2015
- Running time: 133 minutes
- Country: India
- Language: Hindi
- Budget: ₹16 crore
- Box office: ₹71.6 crore

Kis Kisko Pyaar Karoon? (transl. Who-whom should I love?) is a 2015 Indian Hindi-language comedy film directed by Abbas–Mustan. The film stars comedian Kapil Sharma in his film debut, Sai Lokur, Jamie Lever, Arbaaz Khan, Manjari Fadnis, Simran Kaur Mundi, Elli Avram, Varun Sharma, Supriya Pathak, Sharat Saxena, and Manoj Joshi. The film was released on 25 September 2015 and was a commercial success.

A sequel named Kis Kisko Pyaar Karoon 2, was released on 12 December 2025.

== Plot ==
This film starts with a voiceover of the explanation of marriage and how it has changed people's lives. Then, Kumar Shiv Ram Kishan's life is introduced. It has been shown how Kumar accidentally marries three different women – Juhi, Simran and Anjali – to prevent them from committing suicide. Without letting them know about each other, he makes excuses to spend one night with each wife. On the advice of his friend, Karan, he buys three flats on different floors of the same building for his wives, and Kumar and Karan experience unlikely situations as a result.

Kumar also has a girlfriend, Deepika, who he wants to marry, and Deepika's father accepts Kumar as his son-in-law. One evening before Karva Chauth, Deepika's father sees Kumar with his three wives, one at a time, but Kumar passes it off as an April Fool prank played by the women. Deepika's father again suspects Kumar when he sees Kumar's photo and believes him to be engaged to an employee in his office. Deepika and Kumar decide to marry in court to avoid tensions. However, another complication arises as Kumar's estranged parents reconcile, realise they each know their son to have a different wife, then learn he's to marry Deepika.

Karan and Deepika wait a long time at the courthouse; when Kumar does arrive, he sees his three wives – who have become good friends with Deepika – and has to hide. Karan tells Deepika and the wives that the groom went to the hospital to help a friend, and to postpone the wedding by two days. The wives leave and Kumar comes out saying it's okay and they can marry, stopping Deepika when she tries to call her friends. He suggests going to a temple to marry and sends Karan to bring what they will need.

Deepika's father brings Kumar and Deepika to his office and confronts his employee. The woman denies that Kumar is her fiancé, and Deepika's father realises the photo had been left by his daughter. Deepika's father decides to fire his employee for making him doubt his future son-in-law, but Kumar saves her job and Deepika's father decides to arrange the wedding.

Everyone arrives on the day of the wedding, all made to wear the pagri (turbans, with veils concealing their faces) along with their wedding clothes so that they can't recognise Kumar or each other. However, Anjali's brother Tiger Bhai is in search of a man and makes everyone remove their Pagri. Kumar hesitates when it is his turn, but Tiger's men bring the guy and Kumar is spared.

The wedding ceremony continues. By chance, Kumar's face is exposed and he explains that he didn't break the heart of his three wives – that they forcefully made him marry each of them, without listening to him or asking if he was married, that he couldn't leave them to commit suicide, and confesses his deep regret at breaking the heart of his true love, Deepika. Everyone cries and Kumar's mother hugs him tightly while Deepika's father asks Deepika to make her choice. In the end, all four wives are shown accepting each other, with only Tiger left in confusion.

== Cast ==
- Kapil Sharma as Kumar Shiv Ram Kishan Punj "Bholu" alias Kishan Kumar Punj/Ram Kumar Punj/Shiv Kumar Punj/Kumar Punj
- Varun Sharma as Advocate Karan Mehta, Kumar's friend
- Manjari Fadnis as Juhi Kishan Punj, Kumar's first wife
- Simran Kaur Mundi as Simran Shiv Punj, Kumar's second wife
- Sai Lokur as Anjali Ram Punj, Kumar's third wife, Tiger Bhai's sister
- Elli AvrRam as Deepika "Deepu" Kothari / Deepika Kumar Punj, Kumar's girlfriend turned fourth wife
- Jamie Lever as Champa, Simran's maid
- Arbaaz Khan as Tiger Bhai, Anjali's partially-deaf brother
- Supriya Pathak as Rukmani Punj, Kumar's mother & Brijmohan's ex-wife
- Sharat Saxena as Brijmohan Punj, Kumar's father & Rukmani's ex-husband
- Kundan Pandey as Aryan
- Manoj Joshi as Gulabchand Kothari, Deepika's father
- Sunny Cheema as Anil
- Praveen K Bhatia as Guard
- Sharad Sankla as Charlie
- Nataliya Kozhenova as Lily

== Production ==
The film began production in the first week of November 2014. The film was produced by Ratan Jain, Ganesh Jain and Abbas–Mustan under their banner Venus Records & Tapes Pvt Ltd in association with Abbas Mustan Films Production Pvt Ltd.

== Soundtrack ==
Kis Kisko Pyaar Karoon

Soundtrack album by Dr Zeus
- Released: 4 September 2015
- Genre: Feature film soundtrack
- Length: 36:29
- Language: Hindi
- Label: Zee Music Company

Dr Zeus chronology
Ek Paheli Leela (2015)	Kis Kisko Pyaar Karoon (2015)

The background score is composed by Salil Amrute. The full audio album was released on 4 September 2015 by Zee Music Company. Most of the songs were choreographed by Ahmed Khan.

The soundtrack for Kis Kisko Pyaar Karoon was composed by Dr Zeus, Tanishk Bagchi, Javed–Mohsin and Amjad–Nadeem, with lyrics written by Shabbir Ahmed, Arafat Mehmood, Raj Ranjodh, Mavi Singh and Bhinda Bawakhe.

Track listing
No.	Title	Lyrics	Music	Singer(s)	Length
1.	"Jugni Peeke Tight Hai" (Version 1)	Shabbir Ahmed	Amjad–Nadeem	Divya Kumar, Sukriti Kakar, Kanika Kapoor	04:54
2.	"DJ Bajega To Pappu Nachega"	Shabbir Ahmed	Javed–Mohsin	Wajid, Ritu Pathak, Shalmali Kholgade, Rap by Danish Sabri	04:29
3.	"Samandar Main"	Arafat Mehmood	Tanishk Bagchi	Shreya Ghoshal, Jubin Nautiyal	05:24
4.	"Bam Bam"	Raj Ranjodh	Dr Zeus	Kapil Sharma, Kaur B, Dr Zeus	04:05
5.	"Billi Kat Gayee"	Raj Ranjodh	Dr Zeus	Rajveer Singh, Ikka and Dr Zeus	04:07
6.	"Hum To Yaaro Latak Gaye"		Dr Zeus	Kapil Sharma, Kundan Pandey	01:32
7.	"Billi Kat Gayee" (Remix)	Raj Ranjodh	Dr Zeus	Rajveer Singh	03:27
8.	"Bam Bam" (Remix)	Raj Ranjodh	Dr Zeus	Kapil Sharma, Dr Zeus, Kaur B	03:34
9.	"Jugni Peeke Tight Hai" (Version 2)	Shabbir Ahmed	Amjad–Nadeem	Divya Kumar, Sukriti Kakar	04:57
Total length:					36:29

== Critical reception ==
Bollywood Hungama gave the film three stars out of five, citing the film as a perfect vehicle for Sharma's transition from television, the directors' successful transition from action to comedy, and the screenplay and dialogues as "extremely engaging" while calling the music a letdown.

Rohit Bhatnagar of Deccan Chronicle wrote that Varun Sharma's portrayal of Karan was comical, but the screenplay was "dismal", the music was "ear piercing" and the dance numbers were "sleazy", with Kapil Sharma's dancing described as "stiff".

Renuka Vyavahare of The Times of India gave the film 2 out of 5 stars, saying, "The girls look pretty and the samandar song is beautiful but if you want to see the film solely for Kapil's brand of humour, you get babaji ka thullu."

== Controversies ==
The film was served with legal notice citing similarities to a Kannada film, Nimbehuli produced by veteran Bollywood filmmaker Subhash Ghai.

== Sequel ==
A sequel Kis Kisko Pyaar Karoon 2 was released on 12 December 2025.
