= No Entry Pudhe Dhoka Aahey =

No Entry Pudhe Dhoka Aahe
- Directed by: Ankush Choudhary
- Produced by: Prem Rajagopalan; Nikhil Saini
- Starring: Ankush Choudhary; Bharat Jadhav; Aniket Vishwasrao; Sai Tamhankar; Kranti Redkar; Manwa Naik; Sai Lokur; Pandarinath kamble
- Cinematography: Arvind Soni
- Music by: Sargam-Nakash
- Release date: 7 September 2012
- Running time: 163 mins
- Country: India
- Language: Marathi

No Entry Pudhe Dhoka Aahe (transl. No entry, Danger ahead) is a 2012 Indian Marathi comedy film released on 7 September 2012. The film was directed by Ankush Choudhary and produced by Prem Rajagopalan and Nikhil Saini. The film stars Ankush Choudhary, Bharat Jadhav, Aniket Vishwasrao, Kranti Redkar, Manwa Naik, Sai Lokur, pandarinath kamble and Sai Tamhankar. It is a remake of 2002 Tamil film Charlie Chaplin.

== Plot ==
No Entry Pudhe Dhoka Aahe reveal the lives of three men — Krishna, 'the married man', Sunny, 'the bachelor', and Prem,' the married bachelor'. While the faithful Krishna has a very suspicious Kaajal as his wife, playboy Prem has a trusting wife, Pooja. Meanwhile, Sunny's soon-to-be wife Sanjana, is a bit of both.

Trouble brews when Prem decides to make Krishna taste the forbidden fruit that he loves so much. This forbidden fruit assumes the form of sultry Bobby, who walks through the board right into the lives of them all, leading to chaos, craziness, commotion and crisis.

== Cast ==
- Ankush Choudhary as Prem
- Bharat Jadhav as Kishan
- Aniket Vishwasrao as Sunny
- Sai Tamhankar as Bobby
- Sai Lokur as Pooja
- Kranti Redkar as Kaajal
- Manava Naik as Sanjana
- Pandharinath Kamble as Paddy
- Viju Khote as Sanjana's dad
- Anant Jog as Minister Kawle
- Prince Jacob as Peter/Doctor

== Soundtrack ==
- Zapun Zapun - Sunidhi Chauhan, Anu Malik
- Gokulamadhe - Sonu Nigam
