= Ayesha Khan (Indian actress) =

Indian actress and model (born 2002)

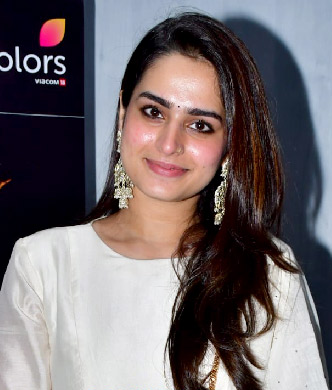
- Ayesha Khan
- Born: Ayesha Khan; 13 September 2002 (age 24); Mumbai, Maharashtra, India
- Occupations: Actress; model
- Years active: 2018–present
- Known for: Bigg Boss S-17; Dhurandhar; Kis Kisko Pyaar Karoon 2

Ayesha Khan (born 13 September 2002) is an Indian actress who works in Telugu and Hindi films. She is well known for her participation in reality show Bigg Boss Season 17. She debuted in SAB TV's fantasy series Baalveer Returns (2019).

Ayesha later made her film debut in Telugu with Mukhachitram (2022) and also starred in films such as Om Bheem Bush (2024) and Manamey (2024). She also received recognition for her dance in song "Shararat" in the 2025 film Dhurandhar. She also starred alongside Kapil Sharma in the film Kis Kisko Pyaar Karoon 2 in 2025.

== Early life ==
Ayesha was born in Mumbai. Her father, Shahab Khan, was born in Pakribarawan, Bihar and settled in Mumbai. Her brother, Shahbaz Khan, is an officer in the Indian Merchant Navy.

== Career ==
Khan began her career as a junior artist with her television debut in Ekta Kapoor's daily soap Kasauti Zindagi Kay. In 2020, she was seen in the television show Balveer Returns as Birba. She then entered Telugu films with Mukhachitram (2022), in which she had a supporting role.

Khan was a contestant on the 17th season of reality show Bigg Boss (2023). She gained significant recognition after her appearance in this show. She then played Karan Grover's love interest in Ravi Dubey's romantic series, Dil Ko Rafu Karr Lei, which aired on YouTube.

She was slated to appear in the Telugu film Lucky Baskhar (2024) but backed out due to schedule conflict.

In 2024, Khan played a supporting role in Sriram Adittya's Manamey. She also made a special appearance in the music video for the song Motha from the Telugu film, Gangs of Godavari (2024).

She had a minor role as a police officer in Gopichand Malineni's Jaat (2025), which starred Sunny Deol.

In 2025, Khan appeared in the song "Shararat" alongside Krystle D'Souza in Aditya Dhar's Dhurandhar for which she received praise among the social media. She then played Ruhi Mirza in Kapil Sharma's comedy film Kis Kisko Pyaar Karoon 2 (2025). Both these roles, besides Jaat, marked her entry to mainstream Hindi cinema.

== Controversy ==
While protesting in Mumbai as an extension of the 2026 Delhi Jantar Mantar protests, Khan was detained by the Mumbai Police. Khan said that she and her friends had not even started actively protesting, but were detained without any valid reason.

== Filmography ==
Key
†	Denotes films that have not yet been released

=== Films ===
Year	Title	Role	Language	Notes
2022	Mukhachitram	Maya Fernandez	Telugu	
2024	Om Bheem Bush	Ratthalu	Telugu	
2024	Gangs of Godavari	Herself	Telugu	Special appearance in the song "Motha"
2024	Manamey	Smitha	Telugu	
2025	Jaat	Constable Ayesha Khan	Hindi	
2025	Dhurandhar	Dancer in the song "Shararat"	Hindi	Special appearance
2025	Kis Kisko Pyaar Karoon 2	Roohi	Hindi	

=== Television ===
Year	Title	Role	Language	Notes
2018–2020	Kasauti Zindagi Kay	Unnamed	Hindi	
2020	Balveer Returns	Birba	Hindi	
2023–2024	Bigg Boss 17	Contestant	Hindi	8th place
2024–2025	Dil Ko Rafu Karr Lei	Nikki	Hindi	
