= Judge Singh LLB =

- Directed by: Atharv Baluja
- Written by: Atharv Baluja
- Produced by: Sumeet Singh, Ravinder Grewal, Atharv Baluja and Chandan Prabhakar
- Starring: Ravinder Grewal, Sardar Sohi Chandan Prabhakar Parjesh Kapil
- Music by: DJ Flow
- Distributed by: Ravinder Grewal Productions & Artha Film Studios
- Release date: 4 December 2015
- Running time: 137 minutes
- Country: India
- Language: Punjabi

Judge Singh LLB is a Punjabi courtroom drama film starring Ravinder Grewal, Chandan Prabhakar, Surbhi Mahendru and Sardar Sohi. The poster of Judge Singh LLB was released on 13 July 2015. The trailer was released in November 2015 and the film was released on 4 December 2015.

== Plot ==
Two villagers in Punjab, India accidentally find a dead body in the wild, which is later found by police to belong to Simran, the daughter of MLA (Member of the Legislative Assembly (India)) Harjit Singh Mann (Hardeep Gill). Simran's boyfriend Sonu (Parjesh Kapil) accuses Simran's brother Garry Mann of murdering Simran for being unwilling to accept the relationship between Simran and Sonu, while Sonu is from a middle-class family and Simran is the daughter of an MLA.

MLA Harjit Singh Mann is now under huge pressure for his son is believed to have committed the murder of his daughter. Despite Garry Mann keeps denying having killed Simran, Harjit believes he is just trying to escaping from blame. Harjit orders police to find a scapegoat to frame over Simran's death. Police choose Sonu, and forge some evidence against him and arrest him and torture him.

Meanwhile, at the same place, Judge Singh (Ravinder Grewal) is a law graduate, jobless and single. His father keeps looking for a bride for him, but his marriage proposal has so far been rejected for 7 times for him being jobless. His eighth proposal reaches Kuljeet (Surbhi Mahendru). At their first meeting, Judge lies to Kuljeet's family by saying he is an advocate and has a great reputation in the industry. Kuljeet's family accepts Judge's proposal.

Kuljeet's father Amrik Singh (Harpal Singh) happens to be a relative of Sonu's mother (Anita Devgan). After learning Sonu has been framed by MLA and arrested for the alleged murder of Simran, Amrik asks Judge to fight for Sonu's case and bring justice for him. Judge agrees. However, MLA arranges TS Brar (Sardar Sohi), who is believed to be the best lawyer in the region, as prosecution lawyer. In the first hearing, the judge approves Judge's application of transferring Sonu from police custody to judicial custody, so that police will no longer be able to torture him.

Amrik later finds Judge is not an advocate but actually jobless, so he angrily cancels the engagement between Kuljeet and Judge. Upset Judge becomes determined for that and starts his own law firm.

In the second hearing, Judge successfully disproves all evidence against Sonu, making the court grant him bail. TS Brar bribes and threatens Judge at his home to discourage him from keeping fighting the case. Judge receives a visit from a police officer offering him money to look the other way warning of what will happen if he didn't. Judge using the money to create a mobile toilet in Brar's name as a tool of embarrassment angers Brar who decided to drop by judges home and destroy his things. Judge arrived seeing his home in disarray and comforts his father. With a burning passion, he snuck into song's house looking for evidence to help his case but stumbles on the bracelet realizing sonu may have actually committed the murder.

However, when Judge is collecting more evidence for Sonu at his home, his finding suggests that Sonu did kill Simran, He send his friend Vijay Soni (Chandan Prabhakar), another lawyer who was once on TS Brar's side, to reveal the truth to TS Brar and collect evidence against him. TS Brar confesses that most cases he won in the past were because he forged evidence and bribed many key officials. The dialogue is secretly recorded by Vijay Soni.

In the third hearing, Judge introduces a disk which has a recorded conversation between soni and brar which leads to the realization that brar manipulated officials and faked evidence to close his cases quickly. The judge on the case concludes that sonu did commit the murder and is jailed and brar loses his law license too. As brar walks out the court room, he is mocked by others and is ridiculed. Judge walks out and looks at brar remembering what he did to his father, he gives brar a tight slap on his face. As judge leaves the courthouse, Kuljit arrives proclaiming her love for judge after her former lover broke up with her. Judge and his dad laugh as they drive off from the courthouse on the scooter laughing along the way.

== Cast ==
- Ravinder Grewal as Advocate Judge Singh
- Chandan Prabhakar as Advocate Vijay Soni
- Parjesh Kapil as Sonu
- B.N. Sharma as Judge Singh's Dad
- Sardar Sohi as Adv T.S. Brar
- Hardeep Gill as MLA Harjit Singh Mann
- Harpal Singh as Amrik Singh
- Anita Devgan as Sonu's Mother
- Vandie Singh as female judge
- Surbhi Mahendru as Kuljeet

== Reception ==
=== Box office ===
Judge Singh LLB took a toll on the collection of Mukhtiar Chadha at the US, Australia and New Zealand box offices in its opening weekend. Judge Singh LLB was released in 42 theatres in three key foreign markets and has collected approximately ₹22.12 lakh (US$23,000) at the overseas box office in its opening weekend.

=== Critical response ===
British newspaper The Guardian reviewed Judge Singh LLB as scrappy, winning slacker comedy. Jasmine Singh of The Tribune reviewed film as the one definitely a bail-out from the usual storylines. ABP Sanjha reviewed film as a good courtroom drama in pollywood.
