= Meghna Pant =

Indian author, journalist and speaker

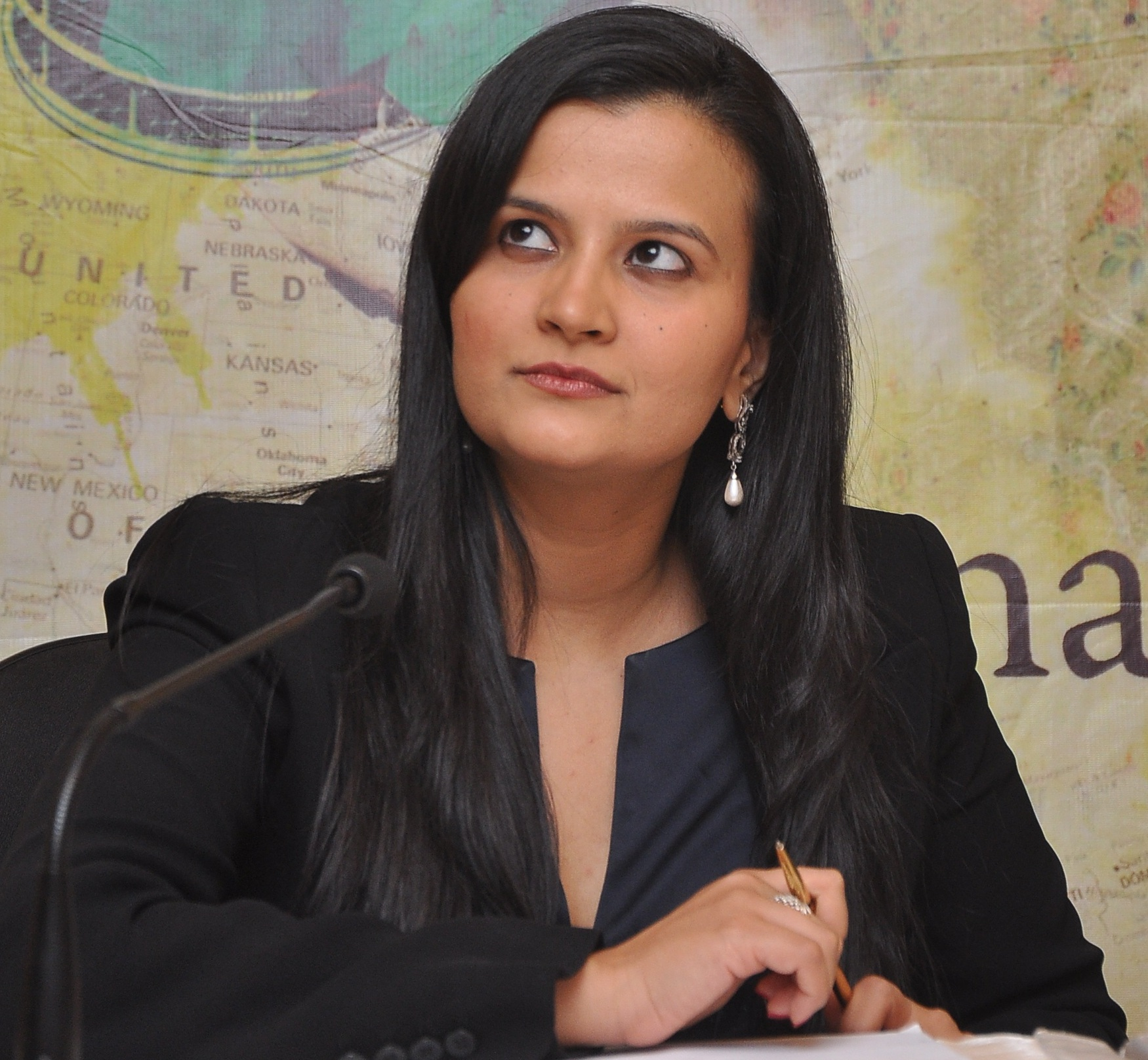
- Pant at the Mumbai book launch of her novel One & A Half Wife
- Born: Shimla, Himachal Pradesh, India
- Education: Masters in Business Administration
- Alma mater: St. Xaviers College, Mumbai; Nanyang Business School, Singapore); University of St Gallen, Switzerland
- Occupations: Author, Journalist, Screenwriter
- Writing career
- Language: English
- Genres: Novels, Short Story, Screenplays, Feminism
- Notable works: Boys Don't Cry,One & A Half Wife, How To Get Published in India,Happy Birthday!, Feminist Rani, The Trouble With Women
- Website: www.meghnapant.com

Meghna Pant is an Indian author, journalist, and speaker. She has won a variety of awards for her contribution to literature, gender issues, and journalism. In 2012, she won the Muse India National Literary Awards Young Writer Award for her debut novel One-and-a-Half Wife. Her collection of short stories, Happy Birthday and Other Stories was long-listed for the Frank O’Connor International Award.

== Career ==
Pant previously worked as a business news anchor with Times Now, NDTV and Bloomberg-UTV in Mumbai and New York City. She reported from the New York Stock Exchange (NYSE) during the 2008 financial crisis. She quit in 2013 to pursue writing full-time, and returned to India.

Her debut novel One & a Half Wife (Westland, 2012) won the national Muse India Young Writer Award (2014) and was shortlisted for the Amazon Breakthrough Novel Award.

Pant's debut collection of short stories Happy Birthday (Random House, 2013) was long-listed for the Frank O'Connor International Award (2014). The book was endorsed by big writers like Chitra Banerjee Divakaruni, Namita Gokhale, Jeet Thayil and Ashwin Sanghi https://sparkthemagazine.com/dont-romanticise-writing-meghna-pant/. The Sunday Guardian reviewed it as "In the front row of Indian short fiction; a gem from the subcontinent." https://blog.blogadda.com/2014/09/02/celebrate-blogging-indian-bloggers-activities In 2019, Wikipedia placed the book among one of the Top 10 Most Memorable and Moving Short Story Collections in the world. "Considering I was told not to 'waste my time' writing short stories, everything about this book has been magical." Pant wrote. https://www.mid-day.com/mumbai/mumbai-news/article/mumbai-diary--friday-dossier-411401 Her second short story collection The Trouble With Women was published in 2016 by Juggernaut.

In 2015, she began curating a monthly panel discussion in Mumbai called "Feminist Rani", featuring interviews with a wide range of Indian feminists. After three years of the discussions, she published a collection of the interviews in her first non-fiction book Feminist Rani in 2018, co-authored with Shaili Chopra. Her second non-fiction book How To Get Published in India (2019, Bloomsbury) was launched at the Jaipur Lit Fest by Shobhaa De, and guided aspiring writers on how to write, publish and market a book, along with insider tips by publishing industry experts like Lord Jeffery Archer, Twinkle Khanna and others.

Pant has written on issues including consent, rape, domestic violence, miscarriage, surrogacy, body-shaming and public safety for women for various publications, including The Hindustan Times and The Huffington Post, and was the Features Editor at SheThePeople.TV. In 2018, she was awarded the Laadli Media Award for her writing on gender equality.

As a survivor of domestic violence, she has also spoken on several platforms, including TEDx, on her personal experience, urging women to speak out against domestic violence. She has also spoken at literary festivals and conferences, including the Jaipur Literature Festival, Tata Literature Live!, Kala Ghoda Literature Festival, Pune International Literary Festival, Young Makers Conclave, #RiseWithTwitter, and The UN Feminist Conference. In 2018, Pant moderated panel discussions at the #MeToo Conversations event hosted by Firstpost.

Pant's short stories have been published in Avatar Review, Wasafari, Eclectica, and QLRS, and her story "Boonthing" was published in the anthology The Himalayan Arc: Journeys East of South-east.

She also anchors various women-centric shows for the news portal FirstPost.

In 2019, Pant appeared as an expert on the show Kaun Banega Crorepati with Amitabh Bachchan.

In 2020, Pant became a podcaster with a show about personal finance called SHOW ME THE MONEY, for Amazon's Audible.

== Critical reception ==
According to Michelle D'Souza of the Khaleej Times, her "works come with strong feminist leanings, and showcase multi-dimensional characters, especially women."

Her short story collection The Trouble With Women was reviewed by Aditya Mani Jha of Business Line, who writes that in the book, Pant "shows us how it’s done, how a skilled writer uses journalistic base to create a convincing, sensitive fictional scenario," and references her previous story collection Happy Birthday as an additional example.

Feminist Rani was praised by Kamla Bhasin as "A powerful, sensitive and thought-provoking book that is a must-read for anyone who thinks that women and men are equals, and for those who don’t."

Her story "Boonthing" was referred to as "sparkling" in a review by Abdus Salam of the anthology The Himalayan Arc: Journeys East of South-east in The Hindu, and she was described as one of the authors that 'shines through' by Prannay Pathak of the Hindustan Times.

Tanvi Trivedi of The Times of India described How To Get Published in India as "sure to answer many questions nestling in the minds of aspiring authors."

After Pant retold the epic poem The Mahabharata in one hundred tweets, Sian Cain of The Guardian wrote, "Somehow, Meghna Pant has managed to contain all of the dynamics of power struggle, war, love, lust and greed in her 140 character tidbits."

== Awards ==
- Times of India Award for Literature & Entrepreneurship (2026) – Winner
- Shakti Award (2025) – Winner
- SheThePeople Powerful Women Award (2024) – Winner
- Laadli Media Award (2023) – Winner
- Society Achievers Award (2022) – Winner
- The Oxford Bookstore Book Cover Prize (2022) – Longlist
- FICCI Young Achiever's Award (2019) – Winner
- Laadli Media Award (2018) – Winner
- Bharat Nirman Award (2017) – Winner
- FON (Fellows of Nature) South Asia Short Story Award (2016) – Winner
- Muse India Young Writer Award (2013) – Winner
- Commonwealth Short Story Prize (2018) – Longlist
- Frank O'Connor International Short Story Award (2014) – Longlist
- The Cinnamon Press Novel Writing Award (2012) – Shortlist

== Bibliography ==
Novels

- One & A Half Wife (2012). New Delhi: Westland. ISBN 978-9381626481.
- The Terrible, Horrible, Very Bad Good News (2021). Penguin Random House. ISBN 978-0143453543.
- Boys Don't Cry (2022). Penguin Random House. ISBN 978-0143455097.
- The Man Who Lost India (2024). Simon & Schuster. ISBN 978-8194643098.

Short Stories

- Happy Birthday! (2013). London: Random House. ISBN 978-8184004038.
- The Trouble With Women (2016). Juggernaut.
- The Holy 100: The Little Book of Big Epics (2019). Rupa Publications. ASIN B07W43RSJF.

Non-Fiction

- Feminist Rani (2018). Penguin Random House. ISBN 978-0143442875.
- How to Get Published in India (2019). Bloomsbury. ISBN 978-9388271066.

Children's Books

- JoJo & Moni: Happy Place (2024). Niyogi Books. ISBN 8119626699.

== Personal life ==
Born in Shimla, to Sujata and Deep Chandra Pant––both of whom worked in the Indian Revenue Service and retired as Chief Commissioners of Income Tax from Mumbai and Kolkata respectively in 2012, Pant is the sister of stand-up comedian Sorabh Pant. She lives in Mumbai with her two daughters.

== See also ==
- List of Indian writers
