= Family Time With Kapil Sharma =

- Show logo
- Genre: Sketch comedy Game show
- Created by: Kapil Sharma
- Presented by: Kapil Sharma
- Starring: Kapil Sharma; Neha Pendse; Kiku Sharda; Chandan Prabhakar
- Country of origin: India
- Original language: Hindi
- No. of seasons: 1
- No. of episodes: 3

Production
- Producers: Hemant Ruprell; Ranjit Thakur
- Production locations: Mumbai, Maharashtra
- Camera setup: Multi-camera
- Running time: 45 - 60 minutes
- Production company: Frames Production

Original release
- Network: Sony Entertainment Television
- Release: 25 March – 1 April 2018

Family Time With Kapil Sharma is an Indian Hindi stand-up comedy and game show which premiered on 25 March 2018 for a total of 3 episodes. The show was broadcast on Sony TV. Neha Pendse was the co-host of this show while Kiku Sharda and Chandan Prabhakar appeared at regular intervals to crack jokes and participate in the games that are being played. Family members selected from all over India participate in the show and play games to win prizes. The show was taken off-air (first for the entire month of April 2018, then permanently) because of cancelled filming. Kapil Sharma had said in an interview that the show will resume later after this hiatus, however that never happened.

== Cast ==
- Kapil Sharma as Himself, Host
- Neha Pendse as Herself, Host
- Kiku Sharda as Bumper
- Chandan Prabhakar as Chandan
- Navjot Singh Sidhu as Permanent Guest

== List of episodes ==
No.	Guest(s)	Date of Broadcast	Featured Promotion	Ref
1	Ajay Devgn	25 March 2018	Raid	
2	Abhay Deol Patralekha	31 March 2018	Nanu Ki Jaanu	
3	Irrfan Khan Kirti Kulhari	1 April 2018	Blackmail	
