= Kapil Sharma: I'm Not Done Yet =

- Written by: Kapil Sharma; Anukalp Goswami
- Directed by: Saahil Chhabria
- Starring: Kapil Sharma
- Music by: Arko Pravo Mukherjee
- Country of origin: India
- Original language: Hindi

Production
- Producers: Deepak Dhar; Rishi Negi; Gurjot Singh; Akshit Lahoria
- Editor: Vaishak Ravi
- Running time: 54 minutes
- Production companies: Banijay Asia; BeingU Studios

Original release
- Network: Netflix
- Release: 28 January 2022

Kapil Sharma: I'm Not Done Yet is a 2022 stand-up comedy special written by and starring Kapil Sharma. It is his first stand-up comedy special exclusively for Netflix. Kapil shares his personal and financial challenges, struggles with depression and alcohol addiction, experiences with Twitter controversies, and professional setbacks.

== Release ==
It was released on 28 January 2022 on Netflix.

== Reception ==
Rohan Naahar of The Indian Express gave it 1.5 out of 5, calling it "Unstructured, unfunny and strictly for the comedian’s hardcore fans." Suchin Mehrotra of Hindustan Times wrote, "I'm Not Done Yet is clearly an attempt to bring the Kapil Sharma audience to Netflix rather than allow us to see him in a different way. But, by the end, you can’t help but want to root for him and admire his journey - which I think is what he and his co-writer Ankalp Goswami were going for. More than laughs, they wanted us to go Good for you Kapil! More power to you. Good for you."
