= Jaat (film) =

2025 Indian film by Gopichand Malineni

- Theatrical release poster
- Directed by: Gopichand Malineni
- Screenplay by: Gopichand Malineni
- Dialogues by: Saurabh Gupta; Sai Madhav Burra
- Story by: Gopichand Malineni
- Produced by: Umesh Kumar Bansal; T. G. Vishwa Prasad; Naveen Yerneni; Y. Ravi Shankar
- Starring: Sunny Deol; Randeep Hooda; Regena Cassandrra; Vineet Kumar Singh; Saiyami Kher; Ramya Krishnan
- Cinematography: Rishi Punjabi
- Edited by: Naveen Nooli
- Music by: Thaman S
- Production companies: Mythri Movie Makers; Zee Studios; People Media Factory
- Distributed by: Zee Studios; AA Films
- Release date: 10 April 2025
- Running time: 153 minutes
- Country: India
- Language: Hindi
- Budget: ₹80−100 crore
- Box office: est. ₹119.24 crore

Jaat is a 2025 Indian Hindi-language action thriller film written and directed by Gopichand Malineni (in his Hindi film debut), and produced by Mythri Movie Makers, Zee Studios and People Media Factory. The film stars Sunny Deol, Randeep Hooda, Regena Cassandrra, Vineet Kumar Singh and Saiyami Kher in pivotal roles, along with Ramya Krishnan, Jagapathi Babu, Prashant Bajaj, Zarina Wahab, P. Ravi Shankar and Babloo Prithiveeraj. The film follows a mysterious passenger whose obsessive demand for an apology brings him face-to-face with a ruthless labourer-turned-crime boss, resulting in a battle between the two.

Principal photography commenced in June 2024 and was extensively filmed across Hyderabad, Bapatla and Visakhapatnam. The film's music was composed by Thaman S, while cinematography and editing were handled by Rishi Punjabi and Naveen Nooli respectively. Jaat was theatrically released on 10 April 2025 and emerged a commercial success.

== Plot ==
In 2009, the Jaffna Tiger Force (JTF) rule ends in Sri Lanka. Ranatunga, a labourer, discovers gold left behind by the JTF. The Sri Lankan army tries to stop him from retaining it, only to be ruthlessly killed by Ranatunga and his men. They arrive in Andhra Pradesh, India, and bribe the local police with some of the gold to become Indian citizens. Soon, Ranatunga establishes a criminal empire in and around the village of Motupalli, with the authorities fearing to take action against him. When SI Vijaya Lakshmi goes to arrest Ranatunga, his wife, Bharathi, gets her and her team molested and imprisoned in her mansion. The President of India receives a letter and a box full of severed thumbs demanding protection from Ranatunga. She sends CBI officer Sathya Moorthy to the village to investigate the case.

In the present day, a mysterious unnamed passenger is on his way from Chennai, Tamil Nadu to Ayodhya, Uttar Pradesh by train, but the train stops at a village in Chirala, Andhra Pradesh due to an accident ahead. He leaves his train to have a meal at a roadside eatery, where some ruffians arrive and his meal falls down. Demanding an apology, he beats them up and they reveal themselves to be the men of Ram Subba Reddy, a local politician. The passenger goes and beats Ram Subba Reddy and demands an apology; the latter threatens him and reveals that a local man named Somulu is like his brother. The passenger then finds and beats Somulu, who threatens him by taking the name of his elder brother, Ranatunga. The passenger receives his apology from Ranatunga, who sees this as a petty issue and does not wish to drag it further. Just when the satisfied passenger is about to leave, he notices something strange, a hidden police car and torn up police uniform. He finds the female cops who have been molested and imprisoned there. He frees them and beats up Ranatunga's men before taking the female police officers away, leaving behind an infuriated Ranatunga who vows to kill him by sunset.

Ranatunga sends his men after the passenger and the cops, and in the ensuing chase through a deserted village, one of them, Divi, is fatally stabbed. The passenger learns from an old woman in the village about Ranatunga's evil deeds, and how he killed innocent men with full support from the local corrupt police officers, including the Chief Inspector C.H. Sunil Kumar. The passenger vows to kill Ranatunga, but first visits the police station to make a complaint. The corrupt police officers humiliate the female cops, led on by Sunil. The passenger is then captured by Sunil and held shackled until Somulu arrives to kill him. One of the prisoner recognizes him as "Bulldozer", who infiltrated Dhaka Central Jail in Bangladesh and eliminated criminals.

The passenger regains his consciousness, and he, with the help of Lakshmi and her team, execute Sunil and the corrupt police officiers including Somulu. In the meantime, Sathya Moorthy discovers that Ranatunga is none other than international terrorist Muthuvel Karikalan, the former Deputy Commander of the Jaffna Tiger Force (JTF). When Sathya Moorthy demands support to capture Ranatunga, the passenger, revealed to be Brigadier Baldev Pratap Singh of the Jat Regiment, is enlisted for the task. He arrives at the spot where the villagers are captured and fighting off Ranatunga's men. Baldev then eliminates all of Ranatunga's men and kills Ranatunga by hanging him, with the villagers doing the deed. Bharathi commits suicide when Vijaya Lakshmi and her team arrive to arrest her. Satya Moorthy informs the President that the task is complete, while Baldev departs in an army helicopter with a promise that he will return again if trouble should arise.

== Cast ==
- Sunny Deol as Brig. Baldev Pratap Singh / "Jaat"
- Randeep Hooda as Ranatunga / Muthuvel Karikalan
- Regena Cassandrra as Bharathi Karikalan, Ranatunga's wife
- Vineet Kumar Singh as Somulu Karikalan, Ranatunga's younger brother
- Saiyami Kher as SI Vijaya Lakshmi
- Ramya Krishnan as Vasundhara, President of India
- Prashant Bajaj as Sandy Karikalan, Ranatunga and Somulu's younger brother
- Jagapathi Babu as Sathya Moorthy, a CBI officer
- Zarina Wahab as Amma
- Swaroopa Ghosh as Ranatunga and Somulu's mother
- P. Ravi Shankar as Central Minister
- Ajay Ghosh as Rama Subba Reddy, a local leader
- Babloo Prithiveeraj as CI Sunil Kumar
- Vinay Varma as SP Vivek Kumar
- Makarand Deshpande as Alcoholic villager
- Temper Vamsi as Ram Subba Reddy's henchman
- Suhas as Venkat Rao
- Mushtaq Khan as Head Constable Mushtaq Khan
- Srikanth Iyengar as District Collector
- Ayesha Khan as Constable Ayesha Khan
- Lokesh Mittal as Government official
- Divi Vadthya as Constable Divi Vadthya
- Moumita Pal as Constable Pal
- Nitin Mehta as Land dealer
- Naga Mahesh as Pandulu Narayana
- Nandagopal as Inspector V. Nanda Gopal
- B. V. S. Ravi as Constable Ravi
- Sreedhar Reddy Nalla Gabbar as Sri Lankan Army official
- Killi Kranthi Kumar as Ranatunga's gang member

Cameo appearances

- Upendra Limaye as a Prison inmate
- Murali Sharma as Brig. Sukhveer Singh
- Urvashi Rautela as item number in the song "Sorry Bol"

== Production ==
=== Development ===
The film was announced by Mythri Movie Makers and People Media Factory in June 2024 on their social media handles. Later the title of the film along with first-look poster was revealed on 19 October 2024, coinciding with Sunny Deol's 67th birthday. The first look poster revealed Deol in which, he had an uprooted fan in his hand.

=== Casting ===
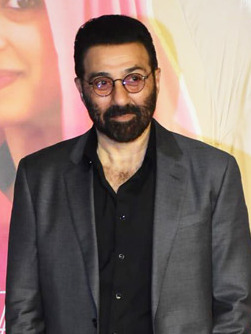
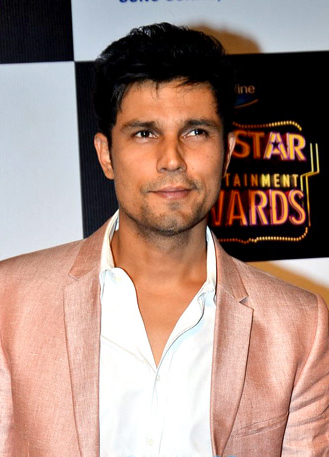
Sunny Deol and Randeep Hooda are the lead cast of Jaat.

Following the success of Veera Simha Reddy (2023), Malineni announced his new project. According to reports, earlier Ravi Teja was set to play the lead role, however, the idea was shelved. Meanwhile, as Gadar 2 (2023) became a blockbuster for Sunny Deol, he was later approached for the main role. Later, Malineni officially announced their film SDGM in June 2024. According to Subhash K. Jha Sunny Deol received ₹50 crore remuneration.

Regena Cassandrra also participated in the ceremony of SDGM. However, she officially joined the film on 21 June 2024. Randeep Hooda joined the film in August 2024, as the main antagonist. Initially, Randeep was not ready to play a negative role, but on Deol's request, Randeep agreed. Deol explained that his brother Bobby Deol also played the role of a villain, while he only plays a character, people do not consider Bobby as a villain, but as a character.

Saiyami Kher, Ramya Krishnan, Ayesha Khan, Zarina Wahab, Bandhavi Sridhar, Vishika Kota, Praneeta Patnaik and Doulath Sulthana also joined in for supporting roles.

Vineet Kumar Singh, Ajay Ghosh, Jagapathi Babu, Upendra Limaye and Babloo Prithiveeraj were also cast for supporting roles. Murali Sharma later joined for a special cameo appearance.

=== Filming ===
Principal photography began in June 2024 and was extensively shot across Hyderabad, Bapatla, and Visakhapatnam. Anal Arasu, Peter Hein, Naga Venkat and Ram-Lakshman were roped in as the action directors. Action sequences were filmed across Hyderabad, Mangalore and Agumbe.

== Soundtrack ==
Jaat (Original Motion Picture Soundtrack)

Soundtrack album by Thaman S
- Released: 9 April 2025
- Recorded: 2024–25
- Genre: Feature film soundtrack
- Length: 11:56
- Language: Hindi
- Label: Zee Music Company
- Producer: Thaman S

Thaman S chronology
Sabdham (2025)	Jaat (Original Motion Picture Soundtrack) (2025)	They Call Him OG (2025)
External audio
- Jaat – Full Album on YouTube

The film's music was composed by Thaman S. The film also marks the composer's seventh successive collaboration with director Gopichand Malineni. The lyrics of the songs were penned by Kumaar, Amrit Maan, Adviteeya Vojjala and Vagdevi Kumara. The audio rights of the film were acquired by Zee Music Company.

The first single titled "Sorry Bol" was released on 1 April 2025. The second single titled "Oh Rama Shri Rama" was released on 6 April 2025, coinciding Ram Navami. The third single titled "Jaat Theme Song" was released on 8 April 2025.

Track listing
No.	Title	Lyrics	Singer(s)	Length
1.	"Sorry Bol"	Kumaar	Madhubanti Bagchi, Shahid Mallya	4:06
2.	"Oh Rama Shri Rama"	Adviteeya Vojjala, Sruthi Ranjani, Kundan Pandey	Dhanunjay Seepana, Saketh Kommajosyula, Sumanas Kasula, Saatvik G. Rao, Vagdevi Kumara	4:28
3.	"Jaat" (theme song)	Amrit Maan	Amrit Maan	3:22
Total length:				11:56

== Release ==
=== Pre-bookings ===
According to Business Today, film had advance bookings worth ₹2.64 crore for its first day first shows across the country.

=== Theatrical ===
Jaat was released theatrically on 10 April 2025. It was clashed with Ajith Kumar's Good Bad Ugly, which was also produced by Mythri Movie Makers.

On 18 April 2025, the film faced backlash due to a controversial scene inside a church. Later, makers immediately issued an apology and deleted that scene from the film.

=== Home media ===
The post-theatrical streaming rights of the film were acquired by Netflix. The film began streaming on Netflix from 5 June 2025.

== Reception ==
The film received mixed reviews from critics. On the review aggregator website Rotten Tomatoes, 36% of 14 critics' reviews are positive, with an average rating of 5.2/10.

Bollywood Hungama rated 3.5/5 stars and wrote "On the whole, Jaat is an explosive paisa vasool entertainer that thrives on its power-packed mass moments, thoroughly entertaining first half, razor-sharp execution, and above all, Sunny Deol's electrifying star presence. At the box office, it has the potential to set single screens ablaze, paving the way for strong collections and sustained audience applause." Rajesh Karkera of Rediff.com rated 3/5 and said that "Jaat is a full-on, South-infused entertainer that delivers exactly what it promises."

Archika Khurana of The Times of India rated 3/5 and wrote "Jaat delivers exactly what it promises: a nostalgia-fueled action drama powered by its male leads and dialogue-heavy theatrics. But for all its sound and fury, it lacks the courage to push beyond its comfort zone. It's a decent one-time watch for fans of old-school Deol-led actioners, but for anyone seeking innovation or depth, Jaat may feel like a missed opportunity wrapped in a thunderous punch." Rishabh Suri of Hindustan Times rated the film 3/5 and wrote, "Overall, Jaat reinforces why the big-screen experience remains unmatched. Some films just feel better in a dark theatre with surround sound. It also proves that strong entertainment value can help smooth over narrative bumps. This one's a solid time at the movies." Lachmi Deb Roy of Firstpost rated the film 3/5 stars and wrote "Jaat is a perfect theatre worthy movie and unapologetically brash. Most of the time while watching the film, you can feel the north south conflict which is just too harsh. An absolutely massy film which is good for a one-time watch. The emotions are high and so are the actions, so what are you waiting for, just head to the nearest cinema halls."

Aishwarya Vasudevan of OTTPlay gave 1.5/5 stars and wrote "Jaat is a violent Ramayana retelling where "sorry" becomes a running gag. Despite strong performances, the film's excesses leave viewers craving an apology instead." Nandini Ramnath of Scroll.in criticized storyline and wrote "The film is nasty, brutish and long. The 153-minute Jaat is most alert and alive in its elaborately choreographed action set pieces, in which gravity, restraint and logic are skillfully slaughtered as surely as Ranatunga's men."

== Accolades ==
Award	Ceremony date	Category	Recipients	Result	Ref.
Zee Cine Awards	March 1, 2026	Best Film	Jaat	Nominated	
Zee Cine Awards	March 1, 2026	Best Actor – Male	Sunny Deol	Nominated	
Screen Awards	5 April 2026	Best Action	Jaat	Nominated	

== Sequel ==
The sequel for the film, titled Jaat 2, starring Sunny Deol, was officially announced by Mythri Movie Makers and People Media Factory on 17 April 2025. It will be directed by Rajkumar Santoshi.
