= East India Comedy =

Indian stand-up comedy group

- Other name: EIC

YouTube information
- Channel: East India Comedy
- Subscribers: 1.42 million
- Views: 146 million
- Last updated: 4 August 2026

East India Comedy, also known as EIC, was a group of 7 Indian stand-up comedians that performed comedy shows, organized comedy workshops and corporate events, and scripts movies and television shows. The group claimed to be India's busiest comedy company with a record 130 shows across the country in the calendar year 2013. East India Comedy maintained a YouTube channel that showcased their comedy stints and satires on topics like politics, religion and the Indian film industry. Much of their reputation was initiated through their online presence. The group used to host India’s version of the Golden Raspberry Awards (Razzies), the Ghanta Awards.

== Members ==
- Sorabh Pant, Founder (left, 2017)
- Kunal Rao, Co-founder (left, 2019)
- Sapan Verma, Co-founder
- Sahil Shah, Co-founder
- Angad Singh Ranyal
- Azeem Banatwalla
- Atul Khatri (left, 2017)

== History ==
In 2012, East India Comedy was founded by Sorabh Pant along with Kunal Rao, Sapan Verma and Sahil Shah. Later in the same year, the group was joined by Azeem Banatwalla, and Angad Singh Ranyal.

EIC is among the pioneering comedy groups in India which, along with Tanmay Bhat's All India Bakchod, is responsible for a complete revamping of the Indian comedy scene.

In 2017, Sorabh Pant and Atul Khatri left EIC to pursue their solo careers. In 2019, Kunal Rao left the comedy group.

The group uploaded their last video to YouTube on 24 September 2020.

== See also ==
- All India Bakchod
- The Viral Fever
- History of stand-up comedy
