= Sorabh Pant =

Indian stand-up comedian and writer (born 1981)

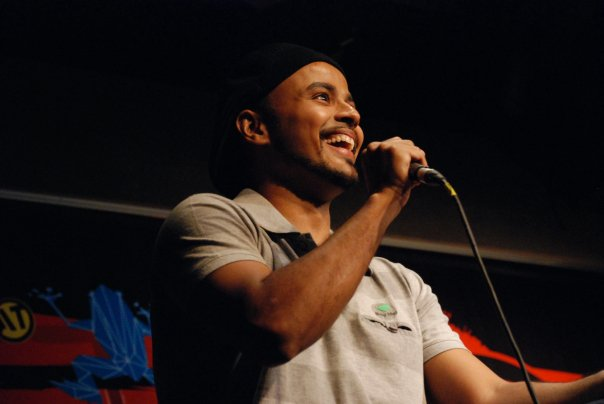
- Sorabh Pant
- Born: 14 September 1981 (age 45); Bombay, Maharashtra, India
- Spouse: Iva Bagchi
- Children: 2
- Relatives: Meghna Pant (sister)

Comedy career
- Years active: 2010 – present
- Medium: English
- Subject: Comedy
- Website: sorabhpant.com

Sorabh Pant (born 14 September 1981) is an Indian stand-up comedian and writer.

He has performed over 250 shows. He was rated amongst India's top-ten stand-up comedians by The Times of India. In a poll by IBN Live in March 2012, he was listed number one of the thirty-most interesting Twitter users in India.

== Career ==
Pant started as a writer for television.

In March 2008, he met Vir Das and they did a show together on CNBC-TV18 called News on the Loose. Pant's career in comedy took off when he started as the opening act for Das's show, Walking on Broken Das, later that year.

After working with Das for three and a half years, he did his first solo act at HQ. In November 2009, he became one of just three Indian comedians to hit auditoriums with his solo show, Pant on Fire.

Sorabh also featured in F.A.Q. on Pogo television.

In July 2011, when American comedian Wayne Brady toured India, Pant was his opening act.

In November 2011, Pant opened for American actor and comedian Rob Schneider on his India tour.

Pant released his debut novel, The Wednesday Soul, in December 2011.

=== Pant on Fire ===
Pant on Fire is Pant's first comedy special, and was staged in more than ten cities in India, Dhaka, and Dubai. The tour reached North America in November 2012.

=== Traveling Pants ===
Traveling Pants is a comedy special which takes on cultures and people in India and around the world. In July 2012, it became the second show by an Indian comedian to be showcased at the Comedy Store, Mumbai.

=== East India Comedy ===
In 2012, Pant founded the comedy company East India Comedy, and over the next year recruited comedians Kunal Rao, Sapan Verma, Sahil Shah, Atul Khatri, Azeem Banatwalla and Angad Singh Ranyal. Pant and Khatri are no longer a part of EIC.

The East India Comedy performed 130 shows across the country in 2013, including the specials Men Are from Bars and Comedy News Network.

=== Books ===
- The Wednesday Soul: The Afterlife with Sunglasses (2011)
- Under Delhi (2014)
- Pawan: The Flying Accountant (2017)
- Vote for Pant: But, Don’t (2022)

== Comedic style ==
Pant's material has been described as "over the top", "manic", and occasionally "marginally unstable."

Wayne Brady, for whom Pant has opened, has said: "He's the second brilliant Indian comedian I've seen, after Russell Peters."

Pant's jokes take a dig at communities and involve a lot of sex – two things which he says work "big time" in India. He also does impersonations of communities, and some of his jokes are about women. Pant says, "I am a home-grown comedian. I have the Indian sensibility". He has also been working on a lot of material that revolves around politics and puns.

== The Wednesday Soul ==
Pant's book The Wednesday Soul is a "fictitious and comic take on life after death". It was published by Westland Books.

== Personal life ==
Pant's sister is writer Meghna Pant. He is married to Iva Bagchi, and together they have two children.

== See also ==
- List of Indian writers
- List of novelists
- List of people from Mumbai
- List of stand-up comedians
