= Kapil Sharma =

Indian stand-up comedian and television host (born 1981)

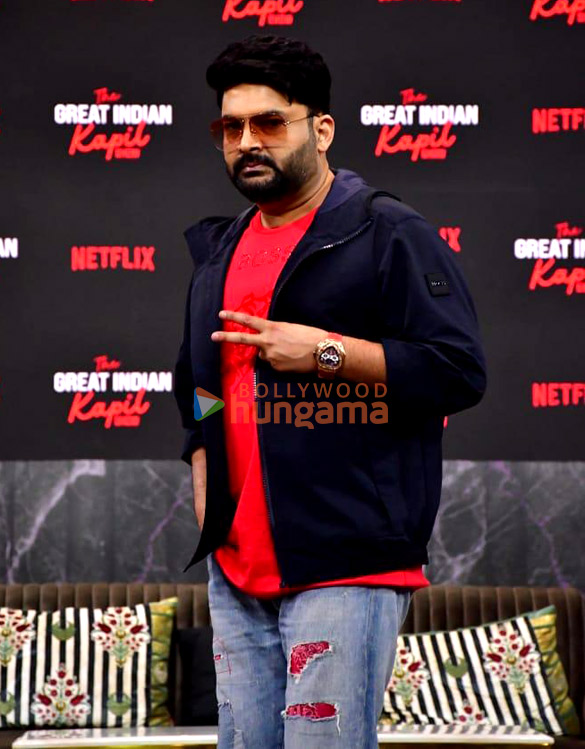
- Sharma at a press conference for The Great Indian Kapil Show
- Born: Kapil Punj; 2 April 1981 (age 45); Amritsar, Punjab, India
- Education: Apeejay College of Fine Arts, Jalandhar
- Occupations: Stand-up comedian; television presenter; actor; producer; singer
- Years active: 2006–present
- Spouse: Ginni Chatrath (m. 2018)
- Children: 2
- Notable work: The Great Indian Laughter Challenge (season 3); Comedy Circus; Comedy Nights with Kapil; The Kapil Sharma Show; The Great Indian Kapil Show

Comedy career
- Medium: Stand-up; Television; Film
- Genres: Insult comedy; Heritage comedy; Character comedy
- Subjects: Punjab; Indian women; Indian men; Bollywood; Fellow performers; Class difference

Kapil Sharma (born Kapil Punj; 2 April 1981) is an Indian stand-up comedian, television host, actor, dubbing artist, producer, and singer who primarily works in Hindi cinema. He hosts stand-up comedy and talk shows such as The Great Indian Kapil Show and The Kapil Sharma Show, and has received five Indian Television Academy Awards.

Sharma rose to prominence after winning the stand-up comedy reality show, The Great Indian Laughter Challenge season 3 in 2007. He has hosted and produced television comedy shows including Comedy Nights with Kapil and Family Time with Kapil. Sharma has also won multiple seasons of the comedy competition show Comedy Circus alongside various co-performers. In 2011, he participated in the singing reality show Star Ya Rockstar, finishing as the second runner-up.

Sharma made his film debut with Kis Kisko Pyaar Karoon (2015), which was commercially successful, and its sequel Kis Kisko Pyaar Karoon 2 in 2025. He subsequently appeared in films such as Firangi (2017) and Zwigato (2023).

Apart from television and film, Kapil Sharma also performs live stand-up comedy shows in India and internationally.

== Early and personal life ==
Sharma was born on 2 April 1981 as Kapil Punj, into a Punjabi family in the city of Amritsar, in Punjab, India. His father Jeetendra Kumar Punj was a head constable in the Punjab Police, while his mother Janak Rani is a homemaker. His father was diagnosed with cancer in 1997 and died in 2004 at AIIMS in Delhi. He studied at the Shri Ram Ashram Senior Secondary School and Hindu College in Amritsar. He is featured in the list of prominent alumni of the Apeejay College of Fine Arts, Jalandhar. Sharma has a brother named Ashok Kumar Sharma who is a police constable, and a sister named Pooja Pawan Devgan.

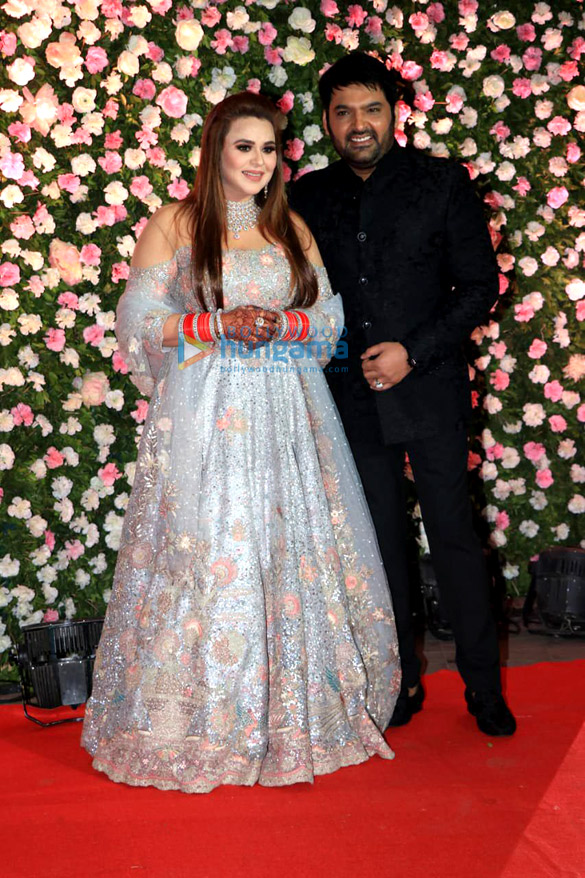
Sharma with wife, Ginni Chatrath in 2018

Sharma married Ginni Chatrath in Jalandhar on 12 December 2018. They have two children – a daughter and a son.

== Career ==
=== Rise to prominence (2007-2012) ===
Sharma rose to fame after winning the comedy reality television show The Great Indian Laughter Challenge's third season in 2007, for which he won a cash prize of ₹10 lakh (equivalent to ₹33 lakh or US$35,000 in 2026). He had previously worked in the Punjabi show Hasde Hasaande Ravo on MH One channel. Sharma has stated he initially moved to Mumbai to become a singer.

He participated in Sony's Comedy Circus, and went on to win six seasons of the show. Sharma was seen as a contestant in the show Ustaadon Ka Ustaad in 2008. In 2011, he participated as a contestant in Zee TV's singing reality show Star Ya Rockstar, and finished as a runner up.

=== Established comedian and film career (2013-present) ===
In 2013, Kapil launched his own show, Comedy Nights with Kapil, under his banner K9 Productions on Colors TV. He played Bittu Sharma, the host of a fictional family show. He also hosted the dance reality show Jhalak Dikhhla Jaa Season 6, and another comedy show Chhote Miyan.

At the CNN-IBN Indian of the Year awards 2013, Sharma was felicitated with the Indian of the Year award in the entertainment category by veteran actor Amol Palekar. In the same year he did live stage shows in Oman. During the 2014 Lok Sabha Elections, he was appointed the Brand Ambassador by the Delhi Election Commission.

Sharma was the co-host of the 60th Filmfare Awards in 2015 along with Karan Johar. He was the presenter for the fourth season of Celebrity Cricket League in 2014. He appeared as a guest on the opening episode of the eighth season of the Indian television game show Kaun Banega Crorepati, and also as a celebrity guest on The Anupam Kher Show. He also appeared as a guest on Koffee With Karan in 2017.

Sharma made his Bollywood debut as the male lead in the movie Kis Kisko Pyaar Karoon, a romantic-comedy directed by Abbas Mustan opposite four actresses, Elli AvrRam, Manjari Phadnis, Simran Kaur Mundi and Sai Lokur. The film was released on 25 September 2015 to mixed reviews from critics but did record-breaking opening day business for a debut. In the same year he signed and was paid to do six live shows in North America but the event organiser Amit Jaitly alleged Sharma did not show up in one city and thus filed a court case for breach of contract against Sharma in a New York court. Jaitly also accused Sharma of not taking his phone calls, and the case is pending in the New York court.

His show Comedy Nights with Kapil on Colors aired its last episode on 24 January 2016.

Sharma began a new show titled The Kapil Sharma Show on Sony Entertainment Television under his K9 Productions. The Kapil Sharma Show debuted on 23 April 2016 to a positive response from the viewers.

In 2017, he did not record his TV show multiple times and cancelled shootings, due to several actors like Ajay Devgn, Shah Rukh Khan and their crew having to return from the sets when Kapil Sharma did not show up. Later Kapil Sharma was admitted into an Ayurvedic ashram in Karnataka to leave his alcohol addiction but he left the ashram before attending the full treatment of 40 days, in 12 days. He told DNA in an interview he suffered from high blood pressure and other health issues. Prior to this, Sharma assaulted his employee and fellow comedian on the show, Sunil Grover, after consuming alcohol and abusing other fellow comedians. Post this altercation, Grover quit Sharma's TV show.

His second movie, Firangi, was released on 1 December 2017. Directed by Rajiev Dhingra and produced by Sharma himself, Firangi was a period drama film set in the year 1920. Sharma played the role of Manga. Renuka Vyavahare of The Times of India in a review wrote, 'Firangi is a boring film', gave 2.0/5 stars and other critics, panned it for a bad story and slow speed. It emerged as a big flop at the box-office. The 25 crore film managed to earn 10 crores and Sharma suffered losses.

His next show was launched on 25 March 2018 stating as Family Time With Kapil Sharma which ended on 1 April after only 3 episodes. In 2018, he produced a Punjabi movie named Son of Manjeet Singh which was released on 12 October 2018. His show The Kapil Sharma Show was renewed with a new season, which started airing on 29 December 2018, produced by Salman Khan. He also lent his voice for the Hindi dub of The Angry Birds Movie 2 (2019).

In 2020, it was announced he will star in a kids comedy show, titled The Honey Bunny Show With Kapil Sharma on Sony Yay. In January 2020, Kapil Sharma, Krushna Abhishek and other members of his Sony TV show performed a live show in Dubai, the United Arab Emirates.

In January 2022, it was announced a biopic on his life is under development. Titled Funkaar, the film will be directed by Mrighdeep Singh Lamba.

The Kapil Sharma Show initiated airing its fifth and final season on Sony on 10 September 2022. The show's main actor Krushna Abhishek left the show due to monetary differences. Before the start of shooting in June–July, Sharma did live shows in North America. In 2023, Kapil Sharma was the lead actor in the movie Zwigato, directed by Nandita Das.

Netflix announced The Great Indian Kapil Show on 14 November 2023. From the previous show on Sony TV, Archana Puran Singh, Krushna Abhishek, Kiku Sharda and Rajeev Thakur joined the cast. The Great Indian Kapil Show started streaming on Netflix from 30 March 2024. In the first season, Sunil Grover returned to the show as a recurring cast member, and Navjot Singh Sidhu returned as the permanent guest in the third season.

In December 2025, Kis Kisko Pyaar Karoon 2, starring him alongside Parul Gulati, Hira Warina, Tridha Choudhury, and Ayesha Khan.

=== Singing career ===
Sharma sang his first single "Alone" with Guru Randhawa with a video published by T-Series featuring Sharma and Yogita Bihani in the leading roles. The song was aired on YouTube on 9 February 2023.

== Controversies ==
In 2016, Sharma tagged Indian prime minister Narendra Modi in a tweet and alleged the Brihanmumbai Municipal Corporation (BMC) took a 5,00,000-rupee bribe from him for the construction of his office. “I am paying 15 crores income tax from last five years and still I have to pay 5 lacs to bribe to BMC office for making my office, Narendra Modi, Yeh hain aapke achhe din?", he tweeted. In response, The Chief of BMC's vigilance department asked him the names of the people who took bribes and assured him stringent action against them. It was later revealed Sharma himself was doing illegal activities involving construction work being done on his properties. The BMC issued a stop work notice to him regarding illegal extensions on two of his bungalows in Andheri and told him to demolish illegal work within 24 hours. On 4 August 2016, BMC demolished parts of the extensions and their officials alleged Kapil Sharma made internal changes on his properties and office buildings without legal permission from the BMC.

In 2018, Sharma did a show for the Pakistan Super League in Dubai, United Arab Emirates, angering many people in India who were hostile to the idea of collaboration with the country. Right-wing politicians and Maharashtra political party Shiv Sena slammed Sharma and said, "Kapil Sharma is making a mockery of India's honour. He just wants to earn money and doesn't care about the country, we strongly condemn Sharma for performing during PSL".

In 2018, Kapil Sharma had an argument with journalist Vicky Lalwani of SpotboyE in a recorded telephone conversation, later leaked by Lalwani. Sharma used foul language and asked the journalist his reason for writing negative and biased articles about him (Sharma). After the conversation went viral on social media, Sharma filed a police complaint against Lalwani and his ex-managers Preeti Simoes and Neeti Simoes, for trying to extort INR 25 lakhs from him. He also alleged in a police complaint that both sisters used to take money from the people who arrived in Film City, Mumbai to see his show and orchestrated misunderstandings between him and fellow comedians of his show and arriving guests. Simoes condemned all of these allegations as false and made-up stories. Preeti Simoes also claimed she was Sharma's girlfriend for 8 years until his engagement. She and her sister Neeti Simoes worked in Kapil Sharma's production with him for eight years until 2017. She claimed trouble erupted between Preeti and Kapil after he announced his engagement with Ginni Chatrath in March 2017. Sharma also abused SpotboyE and its editor Vicky Lalwani through a series of tweets, which his employees tried to cover up by saying his account was hacked until Sharma later confessed the abusive tweets were written by himself. On 8 April 2018, SpotboyE filed a counter police report against Sharma for intimidation, abuse and threats.

On 23 January 2025, Kapil Sharma received death threats from Pakistan along with three other Bollywood celebrities.

== List of shooting incidents ==
On 10 July 2025, a group opened fire on Sharma’s restaurant Kap's Café, located in Surrey in Canada's British Columbia province, that had opened three days ago, part of his "The Great Indian Kapil Sharma" chain. According to reports, an unidentified gunman, in a video recorded and later uploaded on social media, fired shots at the establishment. The bullets not only hit the cafe, but also nearby buildings, causing panic among locals, but no injuries.

Harjeet Singh Laddi, a Khalistani terrorist and member of the banned militant outfit, Babbar Khalsa International (BKI), claimed responsibility for the attack, linking it to ongoing tensions involving the Indian diaspora in Canada, but being prompted mostly by comments allegedly made by Sharma in the past. Laddi is wanted by the National Investigation Agency (NIA) for the murder of Vishwa Hindu Parishad (VHP) leader Vikas Prabhakar alias Vikas Bagga, who was shot dead at his shop in the Rupnagar district of Punjab, India in April 2024. Laddi hails from Shaheed Bhagat Singh Nagar district in India's Punjab and is listed among India’s most wanted by the NIA.

The incident drew condemnation from Indian officials, who reiterated concerns over Sikh extremist activities targeting Indian businesses abroad. Sharma, who was not present during the shooting, issued a statement urging authorities to take action against such violence. Canadian police launched an investigation, though no arrests were immediately reported.

On 7 August 2025, at 4:40 a.m., shots were fired at Kap's Café for a second time. Police responded to a call around 4:40 a.m. of shots fired outside the Scott Road business.

On 15 October 2025, shots were fired at comedian Kapil Sharma's Kap's Café for the third time in the past four months. Gangsters Goldy Dhillon and Kuldeep Sidhu, both part of mob boss Lawrence Bishnoi's operations, claimed credit for the attack on social media.

== Activism ==
Sharma is known for his efforts in promoting animal rights. He and the cast of Comedy Nights with Kapil appeared in a PETA campaign to promote the adoption of homeless cats and dogs. In July 2014, he adopted a homeless retired police dog from Mumbai. He has also campaigned to save tortured elephants across the country.

Sharma was nominated in 2014 for the Swachh Bharat Abhiyan by the Indian Prime Minister Narendra Modi to spread awareness among the public for cleanliness and other hygiene-related social issues. For his contribution towards the mission through his show, he was invited to the Rashtrapati Bhavan by President Pranab Mukherjee in September 2015.

== Filmography ==
Key
| † | Denotes films that have not yet been released |

=== Films ===
| Year | Title | Role | Language | Notes | Ref. |
|---|---|---|---|---|---|
| 2010 | Bhavnao Ko Samjho | Thakur's son | Hindi | Special appearance | |
| 2015 | ABCD 2 | Himself | Hindi | Special appearance | |
| 2015 | Kis Kisko Pyaar Karoon | Kumar Shiv Ram Kishan Punj "Bholu" alias Kishan Kumar Punj/Ram Kumar Punj/Shiv Kumar Punj/Kumar Punj | Hindi | | |
| 2017 | Firangi | Mangatram "Manga" | Hindi | Also producer | |
| 2018 | Son of Manjeet Singh | —N/a | Punjabi | Special appearance; also producer | |
| 2020 | It's My Life | Pyaare, Siddhant's domestic help | Hindi | Filmed in 2007; Released after 13 years | |
| 2022 | Zwigato | Manas Singh Mahto | Hindi | | |
| 2024 | Crew | Arun Sethi, Geeta's husband, a stay-at-home chef who is bankrupt and jobless | Hindi | | |
| 2025 | Kis Kisko Pyaar Karoon 2 | Mohan Sharma / Mehmood / Michael / Manjit | Hindi | | |
| 2026 | Daadi Ki Shaadi | Tony Kalra | Hindi | | |

=== Television ===
List of television shows and roles
| Year | Title | Role | Notes | Ref. |
|---|---|---|---|---|
| 2006 | Hasde Hasande Ravo | Contestant | Punjabi, Runner-Up | |
| 2007 | The Great Indian Laughter Challenge (season 3) | Contestant | Winner | |
| 2008 | Chhote Miyan | Host | | |
| 2008–2009 | Laughter Knights | Contestant | | |
| 2009 | Ustaadon Ka Ustaad | Contestant | | |
| 2009 | Hans Baliye | Contestant | | |
| 2010–2013 | Comedy Circus | Contestant | Winner | |
| 2010 | Comedy Ka Daily Soap | Performer | | |
| 2011 | Star Ya Rockstar | Contestant | Runner-up | |
| 2013 | Jhalak Dikhhla Jaa (season 6) | Host | | |
| 2013–2016 | Comedy Nights with Kapil | Host/performer | Also co-producer | |
| 2015 | 60th Filmfare Awards | Host | | |
| 2015 | Star Guild Awards | Host | | |
| 2016 | 22nd Star Screen Awards | Host | | |
| 2016 | 61st Filmfare Awards | Host | | |
| 2016–2023 | The Kapil Sharma Show | Host | | |
| 2017 | 62nd Filmfare Awards | Host | | |
| 2017 | Aadat Se Majboor | Himself | Guest | |
| 2018 | Family Time With Kapil Sharma | Host | | |
| 2020–2021 | The Honey Bunny Show With Kapil Sharma | Himself | | |
| 2022 | Kapil Sharma: I'm Not Done Yet | Himself also producer | | |
| 2024–present | The Great Indian Kapil Show | Host | Also producer | |

=== Music videos ===
| Year | Title | Singer(s) | Ref. |
|---|---|---|---|
| 2023 | "Alone" | Himself, Guru Randhawa | |

== Awards and nominations ==
List of awards and nominations
| Year | Award | Category | Work | Result | Ref. |
|---|---|---|---|---|---|
| 2012 | Indian Television Academy Awards | Best Actor – Comedy | Kahani Comedy Circus Ki | Won | |
| 2013 | Indian Television Academy Awards | Best Actor – Comedy | Comedy Nights with Kapil | Won | |
| 2013 | Indian Television Academy Awards | Funniest Serial – Comedy | Comedy Nights with Kapil | Won | |
| 2013 | CNN-IBN Indian of the Year | Entertainer of the Year | Kapil Sharma | Won | |
| 2013 | BIG Star Entertainment Awards | Most Entertaining Comedy Show | Comedy Nights with Kapil | Won | |
| 2014 | Star Guild Awards | Best Comedy Show | Comedy Nights with Kapil | Won | |
| 2015 | Indian Television Academy Awards | Best Actor (Comedy) | Comedy Nights with Kapil | Won | |
| 2019 | Gold Awards | Best Comedy Show | The Kapil Sharma Show | Won | |
| 2019 | Indian Television Academy Awards | Best Comedy Show | The Kapil Sharma Show | Won | |
| 2024 | NDTV Indian of the Year | Global Entertainer of the Year | Kapil Sharma | Won | |

== See also ==
- History of stand-up comedy
- Comedy
- Humour
- Humor styles
- Humorist
