= Atul Khatri =

Indian comedian

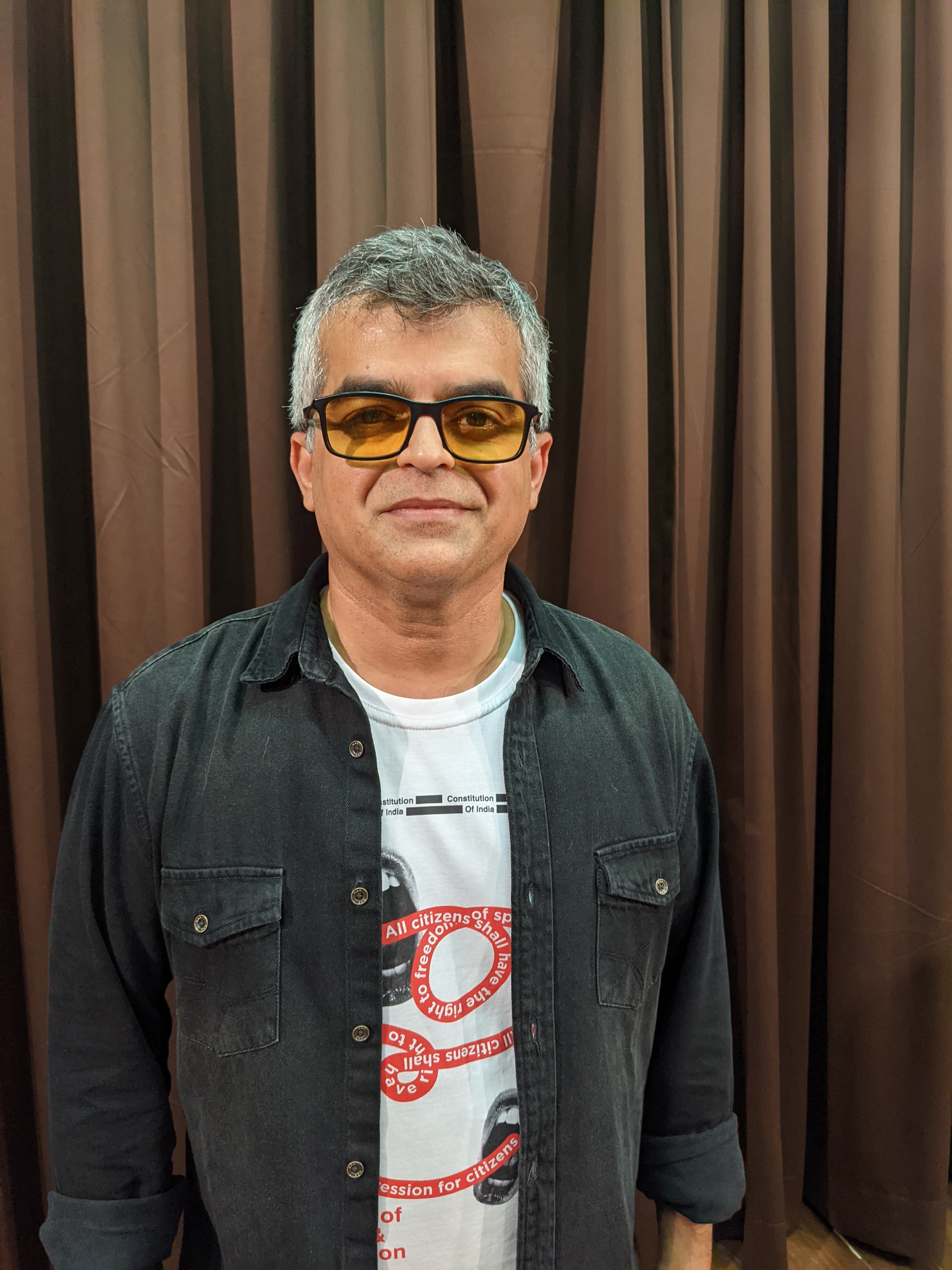
- Atul Khatri
- Born: Mumbai, Maharashtra, India
- Education: TSEC, University of Mumbai; Alliance Manchester Business School
- Employer: Kaytek Computer Services Private Limited
- Spouse: Shaguna Khatri

Comedy career
- Years active: 2011 – present
- Medium: Stand-up, YouTube and television
- Genres: Black comedy, blue comedy, clean comedy, corporate comedy, observational comedy, political satire, sarcasm, satire, sketch, surreal humor, wit / word play
- Subjects: Bollywood, casteism, human behavior, Indian culture, masculinity, nationalism, current events, political alienation, Indian politics, psychology, racism, religion, social issues

Atul Naraindas Khatri is an Indian stand-up comedian and YouTube personality. He was rated among the top Indian comedians by CNN-IBN and was the only Indian to perform in the Hong Kong International Comedy Festival (Sep 2014). He was also the winner of the CEO's Got Talent Season 1.

== Early life and education ==
He attended the St. Theresa’s Boys High School and later obtained a Bachelor of Engineering degree from TSEC, University of Mumbai. He also attained a certificate in Business Administration from the Manchester Business School in Manchester, England.

His family is Sindhi and his mother hails from Karachi.

After completing his education, he joined his family-run computer business (Kaytek Computer Services Private Limited) and assumed the post of Chief Executive Officer. At the age of 43, Khatri became a comedian whilst still being engaged in his business.

== Career ==
Khatri in 2011, owing to monotony and after being encouraged by his wife to do so, wanted to have an alternate career. He initially wanted to take up courses and become a bartender and then later a disc jockey but did not pursue either field. He started by posting jokes on Facebook and later became a stand-up comedian. He became notable after winning the "CEO's Got Talent" award by FremantleMedia. Khatri has done over 400 comedy shows, television advertisements and YouTube videos. Khatri was also one of the three finalists at the Melbourne International Comedy Festival held in Delhi in 2012.

Khatri performs at The Comedy Store and the Canvas Laugh Factory, and with East India Comedy. He also performed in San Francisco for a fundraiser organized by American India Foundation.

=== East India Comedy ===
Khatri joined EIC which was founded by Sorabh Pant in 2012 and is one of the busiest comedy groups in India. In 2017, both Pant and Khatri left EIC to focus on their individual careers.

=== Commercials ===
Khatri has appeared in television advertisements for Amazon, Muthoot Finance, Rebtel, Aegon Religare Insurance, Philips, and Matrix SIM card.

== See also ==
- List of Indian comedians
- List of stand-up comedians
