= Enakshi Ganguly =

Indian children's rights activist

- Born: Shillong, India
- Education: University of Delhi
- Occupation: children's rights activist
- Notable work: co-founder, HAQ: Centre for Child Rights
- Awards: Ashoka Fellowship, Karmaveer Chakra Award

Enakshi Ganguly is an Indian children's rights activist.

== Biography ==
Ganguly was born in Shillong in the northeastern region of India. Her parents were refugees from East Pakistan (now Bangladesh). Her father's job involved frequent moves and Ganguly grew up in many towns and cities. She attended school in New Delhi and studied English literature at the University of Delhi.

Her first position after graduating was at the Indian Social Institute, where she worked with community development initiatives. In the early 1980s she became part of a group campaigning against the new Child Labor Bill that aimed to regulate work for children rather than abolish it. Also in the 1980s she received a Ford Foundation Advocacy Fellowship and spent six weeks at the Children's Defense Fund in the United States.

In 1999, Ganguly co-founded HAQ: Centre for Child Rights, a child rights advocacy based organisation. Through HAQ, she has supported child victims of violence and worked with children who come into conflict with the law.

=== Recognition ===
Ganguly received the Ashoka Fellowship in 2003. In 2019 she was awarded the REX Karmaveer Global Fellowship and the Karmaveer Chakra Award.

== Publications ==
- Thukral, E. G. (2016). Every right for every child: Governance and accountability.
- Thukral, E. G., Ali, B., Chitra, G., HAQ: Centre for Child Rights., Campaign Against Child Trafficking (New Delhi, India), & iPartner (India). (2016). Child trafficking in India.
- Thukral, E. G., Thukral, P., & HAQ: Centre for Child Rights. (2011). India child rights index.
- Thukral, E. G., Ali, B., & HAQ: Centre for Child Rights. (2005). Status of children in India Inc. New Delhi: HAQ.
- Thukral, E. G. (1992). Big dams, displaced people: Rivers of sorrow, rivers of change. New Delhi: Sage Publications.
