= Indian hip-hop =

Music genre and scene

Indian hip hop
- Stylistic origins: Hip hop; R&B; soul
- Cultural origins: Mid–1980s
- Derivative forms: Urban

Subgenres
- Urban; trance; R&B; EDM

Indian hip hop is a genre of popular music developed in India. Desi hip-hop is a term given by Bohemia for music and culture which combines the influences of hip-hop and the Indian subcontinent; the term desi referring to the South Asian diaspora. The term has also come to be used as an alternative for rap music and even pop music which involves rappers of South Asian origins. It is widely known today as desi hip-hop or DHH.

== Overview ==
=== 1980s to early 2000s: Early beginnings ===
Indian hip-hop emerged in the mid-1980s, driven by American breakdancing films such as Wild Style (1982) and Beat Street (1984), gaining popularity in urban youth culture in major cities like Mumbai, Delhi, Chennai, Bangalore and Kolkata. By the late 1980s, Kolkata became a centre for hip hop dance workshops, while Mumbai, Delhi, Bangalore, and Chennai prioritised rap, leading to emergence of distinct regional hip hop scenes in local languages by the late 1990s.

Apache Indian, a UK artist of Indian origin, was the earliest to make an impact on the UK charts with a series of hits during the 90s. This also paralleled the rise of Asian Underground in the UK. The inflow of hip hop into India is also attributed to certain clubs and DJs in New Delhi in the 90s.

Baba Sehgal introduced a caricaturist version of Hindi rap in the 1990s with his albums. Similarly, Devang Patel also started making parodies of Hindi film songs and Hindi language parodies of Western songs, and started releasing them under the Patel Scope series. In 1992, Sehgal's album Thanda Thanda Pani sold 100,000 copies in three and a half months and brought rap music to the Indian club scene, his cadence and flow particularly drawing inspiration from rapper Vanilla Ice. The song "Pettai Rap" from the 1994 Tamil movie Kaadhalan catapulted Suresh Peters as a rapper and a music director. In 1998, actor and dancer Jaaved Jaaferi also introduced hip-hop in Hindi film music, with the song "Mumbhai", from the soundtrack of the film Bombay Boys.

Hip hop in India developed quite slowly in the early 2000s, as earlier efforts by artists such as Baba Sehgal and Apache Indian failed to create substantial buzz, due to their styles being more rap–oriented than representative of the larger hip-hop scene. It was initially confined to urban areas with niche and expatriate audiences, but it gained prominence through MTV and the increasing worldwide impact of American rappers like Eminem, 50 Cent, and Jay-Z. During the late 1990s and early 2000s, the British Asian music scene also contributed to the development of desi hip-hop. Artists such as Rishi Rich, Juggy D, Panjabi MC, Jay Sean, Raghav, Jazzy B and Hard Kaur incorporated elements of hip-hop, rap and R&B into South Asian music. Rishi Rich and Juggy D were prominent figures in the British Asian music scene in the early 2000s, while Panjabi MC's fusion of bhangra and hip-hop brought the style to an international audience. Hard Kaur, who began rapping after discovering hip-hop in the United Kingdom, subsequently became prominent in India with her 2007 debut album Supawoman and Hindi film soundtrack appearances.

A parallel development took place among South Asian artists in North America. Bohemia, a Pakistani-American rapper based in California, released his debut album, Vich Pardesan De, in 2002. The album was built around Punjabi-language rap and autobiographical themes drawn from his experiences as a South Asian immigrant in the United States. His work contributed to the development and popularisation of Punjabi rap among audiences in India and the South Asian diaspora. The release and popularity of Bohemia's sophomore album Pesa Nasha Pyar in 2006, which also featured veteran American rapper Snoop Dogg, is considered as a turning point for desi hip-hop, accompanying the growing role of NRIs and cultural intermediaries bringing fundamental hip hop elements like DJing, graffiti, and breakdancing into Indian masses.

=== Mid 2000s to late 2000s: Commercial expansion, and expansion into the Indian film industry ===
Meanwhile, Yo Yo Honey Singh transformed, popularized hip-hop and rap into the mainstream Indian audience, beginning with the release of the track "Glassy" in 2006 with Ashok Masti which featured Singh rapping in English and the music being produced by himself as well. The track was the first time Singh was featured as a main artist and a rapper, as he was primarily a music producer before with tracks such as "Jhanjhar Kehndi" from his debut underground music album, Desi By Nature, showcasing a blend of Punjabi language with hip-hop coupled with music composed by Singh. Singh is one of the most well known and renowned artist in India due to his popularity amongst the millennial youth, as his songs, according to them, had a unique ambience. The release of Singh's debut studio album International Villager in 2011, eight years after his debut underground album Desi By Nature in 2003, helped the genre skyrocket to the mainstream. Singh's crew, Mafia Mundeer, was, according to him, a platform to establish new artists in the industry. Singh's initial thought regarding the platform was to incorporate different artists who would come together to sing, perform, record and release their tracks with nobody being legally bounded. The platform has since become notable as the roster included Raftaar, Ikka and allegedly Badshah. After their departure, artists like Alfaaz and Ninja from Punjab were included in the group.

There's been an ongoing debate among the hip-hop community about the contribution of Yo Yo Honey Singh to the genre. Singh was one of the most renowned rap artists in India and thus, was largely credited for introducing rap and hip-hop to the relatively ingenuous mainstream audience in India. Singh's appearances on tracks and his mark on the music scene with the release of his chartbuster debut album International Villager in 2011, further popularized the genre of hip-hop and rap in India into the mainstream, even though he has been frequently accused of using ghostwriters, and not giving due credit.

While some artists including Badshah and Ikka, have acknowledged his contribution to the industry, others such as Raftaar and Bohemia have alternatively denied and acknowledged it at times. There is also a negative sentiment among some followers of hip-hop culture in India regarding the recent commercialization of the genre, which is attributed to the influence of Singh's music.

One of the early moments of Indian hip-hop was the Bengali-language underground film Gandu, which narrated a story of a rapper's journey, accompanied by an innovative soundtrack, which became known for mixing rap with alternative rock. Hip-hop continued to feature in Hindi film soundtracks, such as Abhishek Bachchan's verse on the song "Right Here, Right Now", and rapper Snoop Dogg's appearance on the song "Singh Is Kinng". Rappers such as Blaaze and Style Bhai featured on film soundtracks, such as Bunty Aur Babli, Love Aaj Kal and Kismat Konnection.

Besides Bollywood and commercial rap music, many emerging rappers and their crews started to create a buzz in the underground hip-hop scene. Online communities like Orkut and Facebook groups such as Insignia served as incubators for Indian hip-hop, organizing online cyphers and rap battles. The forum Insignia, founded by D'Brassic and Speed Ice in 2008, has been described as a "landmark in Indian hip-hop" by hip-hop producer Sez on the Beat, while rapper EPR Iyer credits the platform as a means of survival for the genre in the early 2010s. Hip-hop crew Desi Beam, from Chandigarh, was also founded in 2008, who remained active on the forum. Artists such as Roll Rida, Noel Sean and groups such as Machas With Attitude, Hiphop Tamizha, Mumbai's Finest, Kala Kurta Gang and Street Academics pioneered respective vernacular rap music scenes. Around the same time, rapper Young Prozpekt (now Krsna), started gaining traction with his conscious hip-hop songs, "Kaisa Mera Desh" and the "Lokpal Freestyle" on YouTube.

=== Early 2010s-present: Underground rap scenes, Gully Boy and mass appeal ===
Although Indian hip hop remained a niche genre for several decades, a period of massive expansion began across the country starting around 2010. This surge in popularity was largely driven by the emergence of commercial artists such as Yo Yo Honey Singh, Badshah, and Raftaar who became dominant figures in the music industry, due to their contributions to Hindi film soundtracks. By the 2013–2014 period, Yo Yo Honey Singh reached the pinnacle of Indian pop culture and the Bollywood film industry, with his music becoming ubiquitous in nightclubs and social gatherings nationwide. Following this era, Badshah achieved similar levels of mainstream success by 2016, with the Indian public widely embracing his commercial tracks and further cementing hip hop's place in the cultural mainstream.

The rap-battle and cypher scene started developing with rappers creating a blueprint for the culture, which was further shaped by Seedhe Maut, Prabh Deep, Rawal, Knuckle Dusta, MC Kode and others operating in the Delhi circuit with communities like SpitDope and 6FU, and rappers like Emiway Bantai, Divine, Naezy, Enkore, D'Evil and Poetik Justis, among others in the Mumbai cypher scene.

Indian hip-hop would further become increasingly popular in India's biggest cities with big names like Prabh Deep and Seedhe Maut who were picked up by talent management agencies like Kalamkaar and Azadi Records who now have music videos with millions of views on websites like YouTube, along with dedicated fanbases that they have cultivated through their music. Prabh Deep's 2021 album Tabia went on to become the first Indian hip-hop album to be reviewed by Pitchfork.

Indian film director Zoya Akhtar was fascinated after listening to rapper Naezy's "Aafat!" and "Mere Gully Mein" with Divine. She wanted to portray the stories of both these young rappers and consequently approached Divine and Naezy and pitched the idea of making a Bollywood movie based on their lives, and the film, Gully Boy, starring Ranveer Singh and Alia Bhatt in titular roles, was released in 2019. The soundtrack for the film featured contributions from various hip-hop artists such as Divine, Naezy, Rishi Rich and others. On 20 August 2019, American rapper Nas, who served as the executive producer for the film, in partnership with Mass Appeal Records and Universal Music India launched Mass Appeal India and signed Divine as the first artist on the label. Universal Music Group and Mass Appeal jointly took the step to take him to India and globalize the Indian hip-hop scene. Since then, Indian artists including Ikka, Tsumyoki, Krsna and Kshmr have released their projects in collaboration with the label, attracting a larger audience and revenue in the hip-hop scene.

Due to the exposure through Bollywood, rap became a household term and an increased production of rap music was observed. This is notable especially in the Punjabi music industry being largely credited to Punjabi artists such as Sidhu Moose Wala, Shubh, Karan Aujla and Yo Yo Honey Singh, while the former three have been fairly recent to the industry.

However, this commercialization has also led to expansion of the underground scene, with independent artists building a name in Indian hip hop, due to which the future of hip-hop in India has been generally perceived to be positive. The reality TV show MTV Hustle, which aired its first season in 2019, has also been credited for pushing the genre forward and providing a platform to aspiring rappers, like King and EPR Iyer. There are many rappers in India, rapping in different languages such as Hindi, Punjabi, Marathi, Kannada, Malayalam, Tamil, Telugu, Bengali, Odia, Bhojpuri, Khasi and others. Modern-day Indian rappers like MC Stan, Yashraj, Paal Dabba, Reble and Hanumankind have been gaining considerable traction due to their distinct approach towards the genre which is pushing the boundaries of Indian hip-hop. The Indian hip hop and rap industry has undergone significant growth and transformation over the years. The Digital Music Study, held in 2022 by the Indian Music Industry (IMI), listed the genre as a favorite for nearly 30 per cent of respondents in its survey. In 2023, Spotify released streaming data that revealed that it was the fourth most listened-to genre in India, and at least 70 percent of the listeners belonged to Gen Z.

In April 2025, Nas visited India again to perform at the Mass Appeal Presents: The World Reunion—A Charity Concert, hosted by Mass Appeal India, at The Nesco Center, in Mumbai. He was accompanied by various Indian-origin rappers, such as Divine, Raftaar, Ikka, Krsna, King, and Steel Banglez.

In November 2025, music festival Rolling Loud held its first Indian edition in Mumbai, with Indian artists like Karan Aujla, Divine headlining the festival alongside rappers Central Cee, Don Toliver, and Wiz Khalifa.

Telugu hip hop became notable since the early 2000s when artists such as Smita started hip hop culture in the Telugu language. Hai Rabba and Masaka Masaka, her best selling albums, received acclaim, especially in the Indian sub-continent. Artists such as Raja Kumari, Roll Rida, Noel Sean and Manisha Eerabathini started the trend in the new-age Telugu hip hop by including rap. With the rise of its popularity, these artists started working in Telugu cinema since the late 2010s.

Tamil hip hop is gaining popularity in India. Many other languages like Kannada and Marathi are also becoming popular among the masses in India. Marathi rapper Yung DSA's song "Yeda Yung" went viral in mid-2025. In 2026, Mumbai rapper Rare78's video of him performing a freestyle in a cypher went viral, which prompted him to release it as a track on streaming platforms, through Mass Appeal India. He became the first Hindi-language hip-hop artist from India to be featured in the magazine Complex.

== Protest hip hop ==
YoungProzpekt (now Krsna) released "Kaisa Mera Desh" in 2010. The track was an anti-corruption anthem against the 2010 Commonwealth Games, and the statement of Indian development in particular. It earned a number 2 ranking as one of the most watched music videos in India overnight following its release.

Protest hip-hop came into limelight again after mass protest started all over India against the Citizenship Amendment Act of 2019. Since the crackdown in JMI, AMU and JNU, and the 2020 Delhi riots several rappers from all over the country have joined the cause with their own sonic protest. Rappers such as Rapper Shaz gained recognition for their protest songs alongside EPR Iyer.

Seedhe Maut also released the politically conscious anthem, "Scalp Dem" with Delhi Sultanate in 2019, which was well-received for its outspoken commentary on Islamophobia, casteism, hate crime, and mob lynchings, but also received backlash, which resulted in the deletion of the song from streaming services. Rapper Karma also released a song titled "Public Notice", questioning hypocrisy, occurrence of rapes, VIP culture among other issues.

During the 2026 Delhi Jantar Mantar protests, rappers Raftaar, Emiway Bantai, Hanumankind, Encore ABJ, Chaar Diwaari, Raga, Karma, Arivu, Vedan, among others joined the Sansad Chalo March and subsequent protests organised across India to show their solidarity with the protestors and their cause. Songs from the participating artists became protest anthems during that time.

== Diss hip-hop ==
Disses became particularly popular and played a significant role in shaping Indian hip-hop post-2018. The first well-publicized beef in Indian hip-hop occurred between rappers Emiway Bantai and Raftaar, the latter of whom appeared on a podcast where he questioned whether Emiway was earning money from hip-hop. Emiway responded with the song "Samajh Mein Aaya Kya", targeting Raftaar and refuting his claims that Emiway was not earning much yet. Raftaar responded with "Sheikh Chilli", then Emiway responded with "Giraftaar", and finally Raftaar to respond with "Anime Hentai", which was later titled "Awein Hai" due to YouTube shadow banning the song. This paved the way for a wave of commercialization in the genre, as many Indian rappers claimed to have benefitted from the publicity from a credit standpoint. It also gave rise to many other publicized beefs taking place.

In 2019, Krsna released "Freeverse Feast (Langar)", produced by Raftaar, allegedly in response to rapper Emiway Bantai's "Freeverse Feast (Daawat)", where the latter boastfully claimed that "he's the only rapper representing India worldwide". This was the first track which sparked a feud between the two rappers, even though both had collaborated back in 2017. After the release of some tracks containing subliminal disses on each other, such as Emiway's "Seedha Takeover" and Krsna's "Dum Hai", the beef escalated in 2022, when Emiway released "Chusamba", in response to which Krsna released "Lil Bunty". Emiway again responded with "KR L$DA SIGN", and Krsna released "Machayenge 4", referring to Emiway's popular song series. Emiway retorted with his own version of "MACHAYENGE 4", and was met with backlash, which prompted him to delete the track for a while after its original release.

== Controversies ==
While the underground hip-hop scene in India was propelled forward through rap cyphers, it has frequently been criticized and has received backlash from the general public. Delhi rap pioneer MC Kode, spoke about the obstacles he faced while organizing SpitDope in 2019, with NPR Music, where he talked about how a rap battle with a politician's son led to him receiving threats and facing harassment due to him questioning the politician's involvement in the 1980 Mandai massacre in Tripura.

In May 2021, Kode received death threats and faced harassment through internet doxxing when old videos of him resurfaced through an Instagram meme page, where he was seen saying extremely unsavoury things about the Mahabharata, Bhagavad Gita and the Indian Army; the former from a battle rap round from June 2016, and the latter from an Instagram Live session. Internet users started a trend to call for his arrest and offered money to even beat him up in broad daylight. On June 2, he apologized on his Instagram story, but further went missing for a week, and his story was interpreted as a suicide note, which alarmed his friends and social media users to call for his search. He was eventually found in Jabalpur, Madhya Pradesh.

== See also ==
- Gully rap
- Indian rappers
