= Our Time Will Come =

Our Time Will Come may refer to:

- Our Time Will Come (album), 2014 release by industrial band KMFDM
- Our Time Will Come (film), 2017 Chinese war film
- "Apna Time Bhi Aayega" (lit. 'Our Time Will Come'), a song by Divine and Ranveer Singh from the 2019 Indian film Gully Boy

== See also ==
- Apna Time Bhi Aayega (lit. 'Our Time Will Also Come'), Indian television series
