= Gully Boy (soundtrack) =

Soundtrack album for the 2019 Gully Boy film

Soundtrack album by DIVINE, Naezy, Dub Sharma, Ankur Tewari, Spitfire, Sez on the Beat, Rishi Rich, Raghu Dixit, MIDIval Punditz, Karsh Kale, Chandrashekhar Kunder, Jasleen Royal, Mikey McCleary, Ace, Ishq Bector, Prem-Hardeep, Viveick Rajagopalan and Kaam Bhaari
- Released: 24 January 2019
- Recorded: 2015–2019
- Genres: Film soundtrack; Bollywood; Indian hip hop
- Length: 46:38
- Language: Hindi
- Label: Zee Music Company
- Compiler: Ankur Tewari
External audio
- Audio Jukebox on YouTube

Gully Boy is the soundtrack album for the 2019 film of the same name directed by Zoya Akhtar. The soundtrack includes work by DIVINE, Naezy, Sez on the Beat, Rishi Rich, Dub Sharma, Jasleen Royal, Ace, Ishq Bector, MC Altaf, MC TodFod, 100RBH, Maharya, Noxious D, Viveick Rajagopalan, and others.

Ankur Tewari, the music supervisor who also compiled the soundtrack stated that he aimed to "bring the two worlds of hip hop and Bollywood together". Initial development for the soundtrack began on late 2015. With Tewari being the music supervisor and compiler of the entire soundtrack and score, multi-instrumentalist Karsh Kale, a band member of Tewari's The Ghalat Family also worked in the project in late November 2018. Becoming one of the most anticipated soundtracks of Bollywood, Tewari stated that the "artists of the scene would get their much-deserved due through this film and soundtrack".

It was released at a promotional launch event on 12 January 2019 and also in the music streaming platforms, the same day. The soundtrack received exceptionally positive reviews from critics and audiences for keeping away with the cliches and stereotypes, being regularly produced in Bollywood film albums which was considered as the highlight. The soundtrack became one of the best Hindi albums in 2019; apart from receiving numerous accolades, the album shared the Screen Awards and Filmfare Awards for Best Music Direction with Kabir Singh (another film released in 2019).

== Release ==
The soundtrack launch was a heavily promoted pre-release event and its musical launch was quite unusual for a mainstream Bollywood film. The film's audio was launched on 12 January 2019, at special event and a promotional music concert held in Byculla, Mumbai. The film's lead actor Ranveer Singh performed live on stage along with actress Alia Bhatt and several other rappers and singers who have contributed to the film’s music. In addition to the soundtrack release, the album was made available in music streaming platforms and YouTube. The televised version of the launch event was aired through Amazon Prime Video (which acquired the film's streaming rights) on 26 January 2019. Irrespective of the soundtrack release, a promotional single for the film, "NY Se Mumbai", was released on 9 February 2019 and performed by DIVINE, Naezy and Ranveer Singh, along with American rapper Nas. The track was produced by XD Pro Music, a Toronto based producer duo, and Ill Wayno.

== Reception ==
Swetha Ramakrishnan of Firstpost reviewed it as "the best thing about the Gully Boy soundtrack is that not one song feels stretched. Each track is paced well; in fact, very often you are left wanting more." Avinash Ramachandran of Cinema Express stated that the soundtrack is a "much needed revolution in the Indian music scene". Apoorva Nijhara of Pinkvilla assigned a score of 80 (out of 100) in her music review, praising the composers and music producers for creating "a perfect combination of high tempo rap, soft songs and poems". Priyanka Bansal of The Quint reviewed "Gully Boy’s music retains the original essence of the street-rap genre. One can only hope that with all the other trends that Gully Boy is setting, honest music from independent artists makes its way into the mainstream." Suanshu Khurana of The Indian Express stated "Gully Boy’s music is the hallmark of change in Bollywood, which is getting stuck in the rut of regularity quite easily these days." Joginder Tuteja of Bollywood Hungama reviewed it as a "trippy" soundtrack, further stating, "An experimental score, this one has few songs in there which are potential chartbusters in the making" and gave a rating of 3.5 out of 5. Vipin Nair of Music Aloud gave 4 out of 5 to the soundtrack stating it as an exceptional one, comparing to the director's previous films.

== Track listing ==
No.	Title	Lyrics	Music	Singer(s)	Length
1.	"Asli Hip Hop"	Spitfire	Spitfire	Ranveer Singh	1:40
2.	"Mere Gully Mein"	DIVINE; Naezy	DIVINE; Naezy; Sez on the Beat	Ranveer Singh; DIVINE; Naezy	3:05
3.	"Doori Poem"	Javed Akhtar	Rishi Rich	Ranveer Singh	1:05
4.	"Doori"	Javed Akhtar; DIVINE	Rishi Rich	Ranveer Singh	2:15
5.	"Train Song"	Javed Akhtar; Karsh Kale; Gaurav Raina; Tapan Raj	MIDIval Punditz; Karsh Kale; Raghu Dixit	Raghu Dixit; Karsh Kale	3:58
6.	"Jingostan Beatbox"	Dub Sharma	Dub Sharma	Dub Sharma	2:21
7.	"Sher Aaya Sher"	DIVINE	Chandrashekar Kunder	DIVINE	2:14
8.	"Jahaan Tu Chala"	Aditya Sharma	Jasleen Royal	Jasleen Royal	2:20
9.	"Azadi"	DIVINE; Dub Sharma	DIVINE; Dub Sharma	DIVINE; Dub Sharma	2:35
10.	"Kab Se Kab Tak"	Kaam Bhaari; Ankur Tewari	Ankur Tewari; Karsh Kale	Ranveer Singh; Vibha Saraf	3:33
11.	"Kaam Bhaari"	Kaam Bhaari	Ankur Tewari; Kaam Bhaari	Kaam Bhaari	2:18
12.	"Ek Hee Raasta"	Javed Akhtar	Rishi Rich	Ranveer Singh	1:11
13.	"Apna Time Aayega"	DIVINE•Ankur Tewari	Dub Sharma; DIVINE	Ranveer Singh; DIVINE	2:20
14.	"Jeene Mein Aaye Maza"	Ankur Tewari	Ankur Tewari; Mikey McCleary	Ankur Tewari	3:19
15.	"Har Gham Mein Khushi Hai"	Ace	Ishq Bector	Ace, Ishq Bector	2:48
16.	"Jingostan"	Dub Sharma	Dub Sharma	Dub Sharma	2:34
17.	"Goriye"	Bhinder Khanpuri; Arjun; Blitz; Desi Ma	Prem; Hardeep	Kaka Bhaniawala; Arjun; Blitz; Desi Ma	3:48
18.	"India 91"	MC Altaf; MC TodFod; 100RBH; Maharya; Noxious D; MC Mawali	Viveick Rajagopalan; Akshay Dhawan	MC Altaf; MC TodFod; 100RBH; Maharya; Noxious D	3:14
Total length:					46:38

== Accolades ==
Date of ceremony	Award	Category	Recipient(s) and nominee(s)	Result	Ref.
8 December 2019	Screen Awards	Best Music Director (Shared with Kabir Singh)	Gully Boy	Won	
8 December 2019	Screen Awards	Best Lyricist	DIVINE & Ankur Tewari – "Apna Time Aayega"	Won	
15 February 2020	Filmfare Awards	Best Music Director (Shared with Kabir Singh)	Gully Boy	Won	
15 February 2020	Filmfare Awards	Best Lyricist	DIVINE & Ankur Tewari – "Apna Time Aayega"	Won	
15 February 2020	Filmfare Awards	Best Sound Design	Ayush Ahuja	Nominated	
15 February 2020	Filmfare Awards	Best Background Score	Karsh Kale & The Salvage Audio Collective	Won	
19 February 2020	Mirchi Music Awards	Song of The Year	"Apna Time Aayega"	Nominated	
19 February 2020	Mirchi Music Awards	Listeners' Choice Song of the Year	"Apna Time Aayega"	Nominated	
19 February 2020	Mirchi Music Awards	Album of The Year	Gully Boy	Nominated	
19 February 2020	Mirchi Music Awards	Listeners' Choice Album of the Year	Gully Boy	Nominated	
19 February 2020	Mirchi Music Awards	Trendsetter Album of the year	Gully Boy	Won	
19 February 2020	Mirchi Music Awards	Male Vocalist of The Year	Ranveer Singh & DIVINE ("Apna Time Aayega")	Nominated	
19 February 2020	Mirchi Music Awards	Upcoming Male Vocalist of The Year	DIVINE, Naezy & Ranveer Singh ("Mere Gully Mein")	Nominated	
19 February 2020	Mirchi Music Awards	Upcoming Lyricist of The Year	Spitfire ("Asli Hip Hop")	Nominated	
19 February 2020	Mirchi Music Awards	Upcoming Lyricist of The Year	DIVINE & Naezy ("Mere Gully Mein")	Nominated	
19 February 2020	Mirchi Music Awards	Upcoming Music Composer of The Year	DIVINE, Naezy & Sez on the Beat ("Mere Gully Mein")	Nominated	
13 March 2020	Zee Cine Awards	Viewer's Choice Song Of The Year	"Apna Time Aayega"	Won	
29 September 2019	Jagran Film Festival	Best Music	Gully Boy	Won	
28 October 2020	Asian Film Awards	Best Original Music	Karsh Kale, The Salvage Audio Collective	Won	
