= Seedhe Maut =

Indian hip hop duo

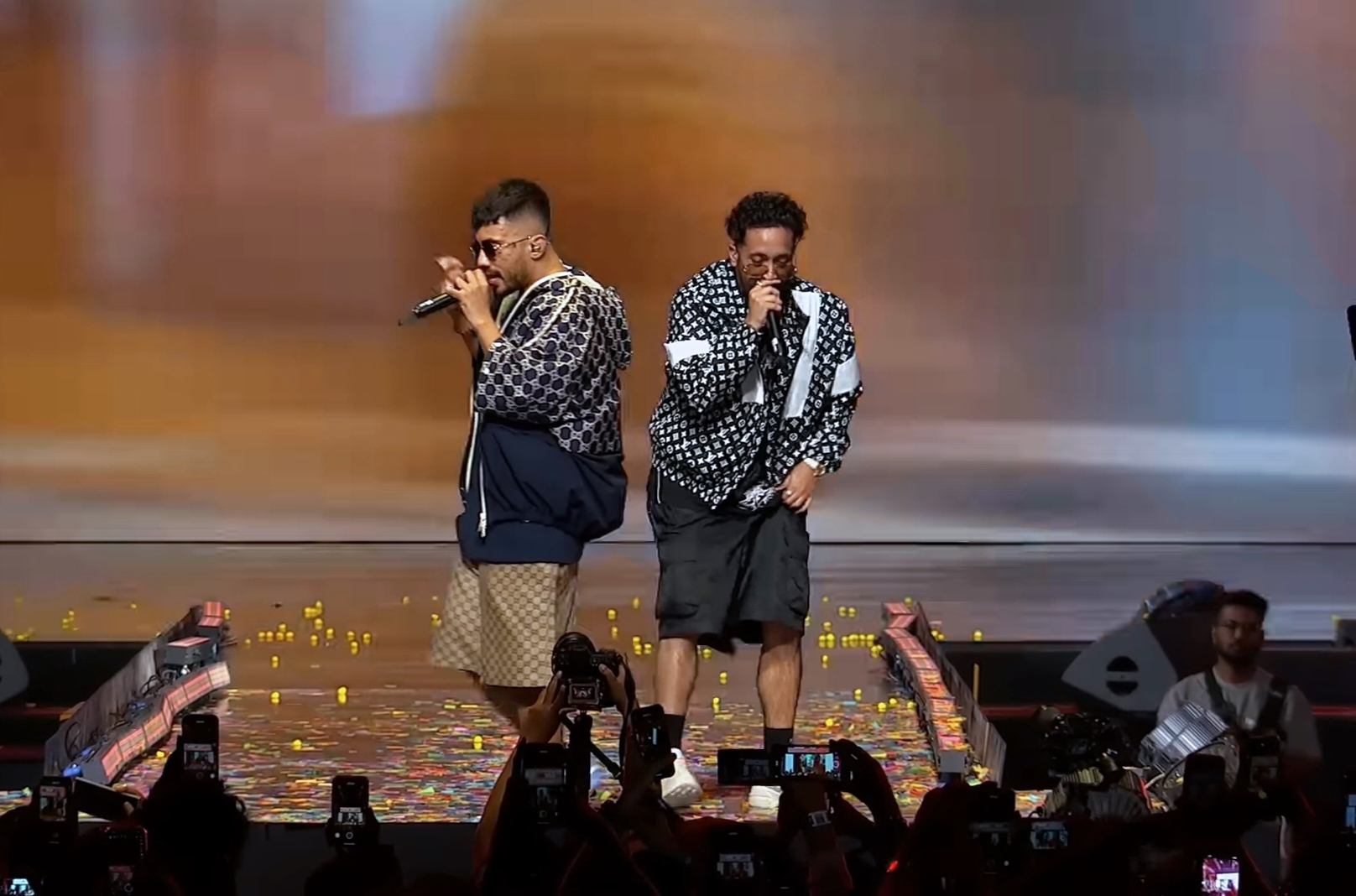
- Seedhe Maut performing at the YouTube Fanfest India 2024 in Mumbai

Background information
- Also known as: TBSM (Tera Bhai Seedhe Maut)
- Origin: Delhi, India
- Genres: Hip hop; Desi hip hop; Indian hip hop
- Years active: 2015–present
- Labels: Azadi Records; DL91
- Members: Calm; Encore ABJ
- Website: www.seedhemaut.com

Seedhe Maut is a hip hop duo from Delhi, India (originally from Uttarakhand, India), consisting of Siddhant Sharma (stage name Calm) from Nainital and Abhijay Negi (stage name Encore ABJ) from Pauri Garhwal. Formed in 2015, their name comes from a slang that the former's brother used perpetually among his friends to signify "giving their full potential to something".

In 2017, they signed to the independent music label Azadi Records. After releasing their final project Lunch Break with Azadi Records in 2023, they departed from the label and found their own independent label, DL91, in 2024.

== Career ==
=== 2015-2017: Formation, 2 Ka Pahada and signing to Azadi Records ===
The two met at Spit Dope Inc., a Delhi underground battle rap league organized by MC Kode and Encore ABJ at Deer Park, Hauz Khas Village, where Calm delivered a freestyle that would capture the latter's attention. After competing in various rap battles and cyphers together, the duo would go on to release "Seedhe Maut Anthem", their first song together as a duo, and the lead single for their debut project, 2 Ka Pahada, entirely produced by veteran producer Sez on the Beat. In 2017, they signed to the independent music label Azadi Records, alongside Prabh Deep, a fellow member of Spit Dope.

=== 2018-2020: Debut album and rise to fame ===
Calm, who previously rapped in English, switched his language to Hindi, when they collaborated with Prabh Deep on the track "Class Sikh Maut Vol.2", which was a sequel to the track "Classsikh Maut", featured on 2 Ka Pahada.

In August 2018, the duo released the track "Shaktimaan", the lead single for their debut album, Bayaan, accompanied by a music video. This was followed by the release of an introduction track, "Kranti", which was also the supposed title of their debut album, before it was changed to Bayaan. Bayaan, produced by Sez on the Beat, was released on December 28, 2018, to critical acclaim.

This was followed by various successful single releases and collaborations by the duo, like "101", "Seedhe Maut Interlude", "MMM/Yaad", Saans Le", with many tracks produced by Calm and longtime collaborator and producer Sez on the Beat. Seedhe Maut also collaborated with singer Ritviz on the track "Chalo Chalein" for the Bacardi Sessions in 2019, which received rave reviews. In an interview with The Bridge Chronicle, they even teased a collaboration album with the singer, but it never saw the light of day and was eventually scrapped. They also released the politically conscious anthem, "Scalp Dem" with Delhi Sultanate in 2019, which was well-received for its outspoken commentary on Islamophobia, casteism, hate crime, and mob lynchings, but also received widespread backlash, which resulted in the deletion of the song from streaming services.

=== 2021-2024: Further successes, Lunch Break and departure from Azadi Records ===
After the release of their debut mixtape न in 2021, which featured the commercially successful "Nanchaku" with MC Stan and "No Enema" featuring Foreign Beggars, the duo released their sophomore album Nayaab in 2022, which mirrored the success of their previous album. The album had been in the works for about two years, and was released to critical acclaim. The song "Anaadi", from the album, won the award for Best Music Video at the 7th Radio City Freedom Awards. The album's release was accompanied by an Nayaab.World NFT collection. The duo was featured in Lifted Asia's "Best Emerging Artists of 2022" list.

The duo was selected for the YouTube 2021 Class of Foundry and performed at the YouTube Fanfest India in 2022 and 2024. They also hosted the rap reality mini-series, Red Bull Spotlight, in 2021.

They shifted to a more mainstream sound through their star-studded mixtape Lunch Break in 2023. The mixtape featured appearances from fellow hip-hop artists like Krsna, Faris Shafi, Rawal, Yungsta, Sonnyjim, Badshah, Rebel 7, Raga among others. The songs "Khatta Flow", "11K", "Asal G" and "Luka Chuppi" achieved significant media coverage. The duo also embarked on The Lunch Break Tour in March 2024, performing in cities such as Jaipur, Ahmedabad, Delhi, Mumbai, and Chandigarh, among others. They also teased their upcoming third studio album, Kavi Kehna Chahte Hain, in their interviews and through the last two tracks of the mixtape. The mixtape was included in the list of "The 10 Best Albums of 2023" by Mint.

After releasing Lunch Break, they departed from Azadi Records, and founded their own label, DL91 Era in 2023. Their following EPs Shakti and Kshama, were released through DL91 Era in 2024. Shakti and Kshama were 2-part EPs that were inspired by legendary Indian poet Ramdhari Singh Dinkar's poem Shakti Aur Kshama. Their song, "Raat Ki Rani", from the EP Shakti, was featured in a mission in the video game Call of Duty: Modern Warfare 4. They also featured on the song, "Guddi Check", from the album Thugs From Amritsar, by Pataka Boys.

In the same year, they also collaborated with Jameson Irish Whiskey for their Distilled Sounds Program alongside South African pop singer Shekhinah. The program also featured other global music artists like Anderson .Paak and Kaiit, among others. The duo was also seen as guest judges on the shows, India's Got Latent and MTV Hustle.

In the same year in June, they engaged in a well-publicised beef with Kashmiri hip-hop duo SOS, their former labelmates at Azadi Records, after trading subliminal disses against each other for the last few years. The duo released a part 2-part diss track, "TT/Shutdown" in response to the latter's "Blackball". They further followed with "Kaanch Ke Ghar", which was the last track from their side in the beef, even though SOS responded with two more diss tracks.

=== 2025-present: DL91 FM and SMX Tour ===
They released their first compilation album, DL91 FM, through their newly founded label, DL91 Era, in 2025, featuring appearances from various DL91 artists, namely, Lil Bhavi, Ab-17, OG Lucifer, GhAatak, Bhaskar as well as the comedian Samay Raina. Their first album to not feature production from Sez on the Beat, all the tracks were instead produced by the label's signee, Hurricane. In June 2025, they performed a set at the Glastonbury Festival 2025. In September 2025, they announced a nationwide 15-city tour, The SMX India Tour, sponsored by Red FM, which started from November 1 and continued till December 27, to commemorate the 10 year anniversary of their venture into music. However, their concert in Dehradun was canceled due to backlash from the organisation Bajrang Dal, citing that the duo's songs were "vulgar" and "they will not allow any artiste to disturb and corrupt the 'maryada' of 'Devbhoomi'".

In January 2026, they announced The SMX Global Tour, spanning 10 countries, as a part of which they will be performing in cities like Singapore, Melbourne, Sydney, Dublin, Manchester, London, New York, Chicago, Toronto and Los Angeles, among others, from April 2026 to June 2026. In the same month, Calm was featured on the song "Stadium Coupe", alongside American rapper Smino. The song was produced by Pakistani producer Umair. The duo is now set to perform at the second edition of the hip-hop festival, Rolling Loud India.

== Discography ==
=== Albums and mixtapes ===
Title	Details
Bayaan	Released: 28 December 2018; Formats: Digital download, streaming
न	Released: 8 September 2021; Formats: Digital download, streaming
Nayaab	Released: 27 May 2022; Formats: Digital download, streaming
Lunch Break	Released: 19 August 2023; Formats: Digital download, streaming
DL91 FM	Released: 15 May 2025; Formats: Digital download, streaming

=== Extended plays ===
Title	Details
2 Ka Pahada	Released: 20 May 2017; Formats: Digital download, streaming
Shakti	Released: 15 August 2024; Formats: Digital download, streaming
Kshama	Released: 14 December 2024; Formats: Digital download, streaming
Don't Try This At Home (with Krsna)	Released: 20 November 2026; Formats: Digital download, streaming

=== Singles and collaborations ===
Title	Year	Album
"Savage"	2016	New Delhi Mixtape-Khatarnaak
"Seedhe Maut Anthem"	2017	2 Ka Pahada
"Class-Sikh Maut, Vol. II" (Seedhe Maut, Prabh Deep and Sez on the Beat)	2018	Non-album single
"Ohh No" (Yungsta and Frappe Ash featuring Seedhe Maut)	2018	Showtime
"Dekh" (Dee MC featuring Seedhe Maut and Yungsta)	2018	Non-album single
"Kranti" (Seedhe Maut featuring Sez on the Beat)	2018	Non-album single
"Saans Le" (Seedhe Maut featuring Sez on the Beat)	2019	Non-album single
"Seedhe Maut Interlude" (Tienas featuring Seedhe Maut)	2019	O
"101"	2019	Non-album single
"Chalo Chalein" (Ritviz featuring Seedhe Maut)	2019	Dev
"MMM [Muh Miya Mitthu]" (Seedhe Maut featuring Sez on the Beat)	2020	Non-album single
"Yaad"	2020	Non-album single
"Ball"	2020	Non-album single
"Roshni" (SickFlip, Ritviz and Seedhe Maut)	2020	Non-album single
"Do Guna"	2020	Non-album single
"Scalp Dem" (Seedhe Maut and Delhi Sultanate)	2020	Non-album single
"Dum Pishaach" (Seedhe Maut featuring Karan Kanchan)	2020	Non-album single
"Sar Utha" (Seedhe Maut featuring Zero Chill)	2021	Non-album single
"Sheh Maat"	2021	Non-album single
"Jama Kar" (MC Altaf, Seedhe Maut and Karan Kanchan)	2021	Non-album single
"Sanki" (Ikka featuring Seedhe Maut, Raga and Aghor)	2022	Nishu
"नalla Freestyle" (Seedhe Maut featuring DJ Sa)	2022	Non-album single
"Holi Re Rasiya" (Maithili Thakur, Ravi Kishan, Seedhe Maut and Mahan)	2023	Coke Studio Bharat
"7:30" (Bhaktaaa, KYABC, Seedhe Maut and Hisab)	2023	Kaan Ke Neeche
"Hausla"	2023	Lunch Break
"K-Pot"	2023	Non-album single
"Tofa"	2023	Non-album single
"Hola Amigo" (Krsna featuring Seedhe Maut and Umair)	2023	Far From Over
"2 good" (RANJ, Clifr, Seedhe Maut and Karan Kanchan)	2023	Antihero
"Bhussi" (KSHMR, Seedhe Maut and Karan Kanchan)	2023	Karam
"Asambhav" (Bhaskar, OG Lucifer, and Seedhe Maut)	2024	Section 71 (Deluxe)
"Mehenga" (Rashmeet Kaur and NDS featuring Seedhe Maut)	2024	Kaura (Aura Of Kaur)
"Shaayar" (Bharat Chauhan featuring Seedhe Maut)	2024	Non-album single
"Bajenge" (Badshah featuring Seedhe Maut)	2024	Ek Tha Raja
"Tour Shit!"	2024	Non-album single
"Bure Din" (Seedhe Maut featuring Mick Jenkins)	2024	Non-album single
"TT / Shutdown"	2024	Non-album single
"Kaanch Ke Ghar"	2024	Non-album single
"KODAK" (King featuring Seedhe Maut)	2024	Monopoly Moves
"Guddi Check" (PAV4N, Sonnyjim and Kartik featuring Seedhe Maut)	2024	Thugs From Amritsar
"Change" (Seedhe Maut and Shekhinah)	2024	Non-album single
"NAMUNA"	2024	Non-album single
"SRK"	2024	Non-album single
"Bhundfaad" (Rawal featuring Seedhe Maut)	2025	Sherdil
"Sensitive" (Krsna featuring Seedhe Maut)	2025	Yours Truly
"Pancake" (Seedhe Maut featuring Hurricane)	2025	DL91 FM
"MUDDA" (Yung Sammy featuring Seedhe Maut)	2025	Non-album single
"CRITICS" (Ab-17 featuring Seedhe Maut)	2025	Baawe Era
"Bazaar" (Bharat Chauhan featuring Seedhe Maut)	2026	Uns
"Kuch Mat Kar" "Untitled" (Raga featuring Seedhe Maut)	2026	No Formula
"Buzz" (Krsna and Seedhe Maut)	2026	Non-album single
