= Sez on the Beat =

Indian record producer and composer

- Born: Sajeel Kapoor
- Origin: New Delhi, India
- Genres: Indian hip hop; hip hop
- Occupations: Record producer; composer
- Years active: 2010–present
- Labels: The MVMNT; Azadi

Sajeel Kapoor, known professionally as Sez on the Beat, is an Indian record producer and composer from New Delhi. His production work has been associated with the development of independent Indian hip hop, particularly through collaborations with Divine, Naezy, Prabh Deep, Seedhe Maut and Ahmer.

Kapoor produced or co-produced recordings including Divine's "Yeh Mera Bombay" and "Jungli Sher", Divine and Naezy's "Mere Gully Mein", Naezy's "Asal Hustle", Prabh Deep's debut album Class-Sikh, Seedhe Maut's albums Bayaan and Nayaab, and Ahmer's debut album Little Kid, Big Dreams.

The original version of "Mere Gully Mein", released in 2015, was recreated for the soundtrack of the 2019 Hindi film Gully Boy, with Divine, Naezy and Sez credited as composers.

In 2020, Kapoor and music executive Faizan Khan established The MVMNT, a hip-hop collective and record label intended to support emerging artists. Later in the same year, SIRI and Sez on the Beat were jointly nominated for Best India Act at the 2020 MTV Europe Music Awards.

== Early life and background ==
Kapoor grew up in West Delhi. As a teenager, he became interested in computer-based music production after experimenting with mashups and mixes using software including VirtualDJ. He subsequently began producing original electronic music and has identified 2010 as the beginning of his work as a producer.

Kapoor enrolled in an undergraduate computer science programme at the University of Delhi. While studying, he participated in an Indian hip-hop community on Orkut called Insignia, through which rappers and producers shared songs, instrumental tracks and feedback. In an interview with Mid-Day, he described the forum as a "landmark in Indian hip-hop history". He initially concentrated on electronic dance music, but Mumbai rapper Enkore encouraged him to experiment with hip-hop production in approximately 2012.

Kapoor has said that friends had shortened his name to "Sez" and that he later added the phrase "On the Beat", following a naming convention used by some hip-hop producers.

== Career ==
=== 2013–2016: Early collaborations and breakthrough ===
In 2013, rapper Divine contacted Kapoor about producing music for "Yeh Mera Bombay". Kapoor co-produced the recording with RJV Ernesto. The song initially attracted a limited audience but subsequently circulated more widely online and became one of Kapoor's early prominent production credits. Kapoor produced some of the early posse cuts in the Indian hip-hop scene, like the "DLCYPR1947" and "Bombay Rap Cypher 2014", in 2014.

Kapoor later produced Divine and Naezy's "Mere Gully Mein", released in 2015. The song's lyrics described life in Mumbai neighbourhoods and it became associated with the development of the gully rap movement. Pitchfork later identified Kapoor, Divine, Naezy and Prabh Deep among the artists who helped develop a new archetype for India's emerging hip-hop scene.

Kapoor continued working with Divine on "Jungli Sher" and produced Naezy's "Asal Hustle" and "Tehelka". He also produced "Tragedy Mein Comedy", by Naezy, a satirical song which was used as the intro track in the show On Air With AIB, which was created by the comedy group All India Bakchod.

During this period, Kapoor and Guwahati-based producer Rajdeep "Stunnah Beatz" Sinha established StunnahSezBeatz, an online platform through which performers could license or purchase instrumental tracks. The venture was intended to provide independent producers with a commercial market for their beats.

=== 2017–2019: Class-Sikh, film work and albums ===
Kapoor produced Prabh Deep's debut studio album Class-Sikh, released in 2017. The album was performed primarily in Punjabi and addressed subjects including life in Delhi's Tilak Nagar neighbourhood, drug abuse and the experiences of Sikh families affected by the 1984 anti-Sikh riots. Wild City reported that the album's instrumental tracks were produced exclusively by Kapoor.

In 2017, Kapoor composed "Singakutty" for filmmaker Bejoy Nambiar's Malayalam–Tamil anthology film Solo. It was his first film-composition project and took approximately four months to complete.

Kapoor produced Bayaan, the 2018 debut studio album by Delhi hip-hop duo Seedhe Maut. Scroll.in included the album among the projects through which Kapoor became involved in significant developments in India's independent hip-hop movement. Wild City included Kapoor among the artists it considered influential in India's alternative-music output during 2018, highlighting his production work on Bayaan and Prabh Deep's releases. In the same year, Sez was the subject of a documentary, produced by The Indian Express, as part of their online series, Portraits.

In 2019, Kapoor worked with Srinagar rapper Ahmer on the eight-track debut album Little Kid, Big Dreams. Kapoor produced the album's dark instrumental soundscapes and assisted Ahmer with the arrangement and delivery of his verses. Kapoor and others involved in the project encouraged Ahmer to record in Kashmiri as well as Hindi and Urdu. Rolling Stone India subsequently included the album track "Elaan" on its list of the ten best Indian singles of 2019.

The same year, the original version of "Mere Gully Mein" was recreated for Gully Boy. Ranveer Singh and Divine performed the film version, while Divine, Naezy and Sez were credited as composers. The film's success brought increased public attention to Indian hip-hop, although Kapoor also spoke about the comparatively limited public recognition and compensation received by music producers.

=== 2020–present: The MVMNT and later collaborations ===
In early 2020, Kapoor and music executive Faizan Khan established The MVMNT as a hip-hop collective and independent label, after Kapoor parted ways with Azadi Records. The collective was publicly introduced at the 2020 edition of the VH1 Supersonic festival.

Kapoor released "Goonj", featuring Enkore, Rebel 7, The Siege, Yungsta and Smoke, through The MVMNT in March 2020. He subsequently released "Kahaani 2020", featuring Zaeden, Enkore, Yungsta, Lit Happu and Shayan.

In May 2020, Kapoor and Prabh Deep released "Toofan Main", an original promotional track connected with the Amazon Prime Video series Paatal Lok.

Later that year, Kapoor released the five-track EP New Kids on the Block, Vol. 1, featuring Lit Happu, DRV, Rawal, NoNation and Luck. Rolling Stone India awarded the EP four out of five stars and described it as a project centred on introducing emerging performers.

Kapoor also collaborated with Bengaluru rapper SIRI on the single "My Jam". SIRI and Sez on the Beat were subsequently nominated for Best India Act at the 2020 MTV Europe Music Awards. Kapoor also produced the track "No Enema" by Seedhe Maut featuring English rap group Foreign Beggars in 2021.

Kapoor reunited with Seedhe Maut for the collaborative studio album Nayaab, released in 2022. The 17-track album dealt with the trio's professional development, friendships and ambitions. Rolling Stone India ranked Nayaab tenth on its list of the 15 best Indian albums of 2022.

Later in 2022, Kapoor produced Delhi rapper Ab-17's debut EP Tez Filam. The collaboration followed Ab-17's appearance on "Batti", a track from Nayaab.

In 2023, Kapoor produced Meen, an autobiographical studio album by Delhi rapper Yungsta. The 11-track album was released by The MVMNT and Mass Appeal India and included appearances by Ikka, Raga, Seedhe Maut, Frappe Ash, Yashraj and other performers. Rolling Stone India noted that Kapoor used varied production styles across the album while maintaining its autobiographical narrative.

Kapoor also worked with Uttarakhand rapper Dakait on the 2023 album Dev Nagri Aur Main. The 23-track project was released through The MVMNT and Mass Appeal and incorporated themes related to Uttarakhand's culture and Dakait's experiences.

By 2024, The MVMNT partnered with Mass Appeal India on releases by Ab-17, Dakait, Yungsta and other artists. Kapoor and Ab-17 released a second collaborative project, Mr. Baawe, in June 2024. In the same year, he produced four tracks from Ikka's third album, Only Love Gets Reply, including the song "Jagga Jatt", featuring Diljit Dosanjh and Badshah, which became a hit. He also produced Ikka's track "Mera Ghar Jamnapaar" from the web series Jamnapaar.

In 2026, Kapoor contributed to the soundtrack of the Hindi film Tu Yaa Main. He was credited as an artist on "Naam Karu Bada" with Adarsh Gourav, who starred in the film, and on "Aala Flowpara" with Gourav, 100RBH and Riya Nambiar. He further produced the EP, Enigma 2 Icon, by Ikka, in the same year.

== Musical style and production approach ==
Kapoor's work is primarily associated with hip-hop, although he began producing electronic dance music before moving into hip-hop production. He has cited electronic musicians including Tiësto, Skrillex and David Guetta among his early influences, while Mumbai rapper Enkore influenced his transition towards hip hop. His production has incorporated trap percussion, sampled recordings, synthesised bass and electronically programmed drums. Pitchfork described his production on Class-Sikh as "gritty" and "trap-tinged", highlighting its use of skittering 808 rhythms, bass synthesisers and samples.

Kapoor principally uses FL Studio as his digital audio workstation. Kapoor has also said that he uses pauses, drum variations, rhythmic accents and vocal effects to respond to a rapper's flow and give recordings a greater sense of movement. His recordings commonly include the producer tag "Sez on the beat, boy", which identifies his production work.

== Selected discography ==
=== Albums and extended plays ===
Selected albums and EPs
Year	Title	Credited artist	Ref.
2017	Class-Sikh	Prabh Deep and Sez on the Beat	
2018	Bayaan	Seedhe Maut and Sez on the Beat	
2019	Little Kid, Big Dreams	Ahmer and Sez on the Beat	
2020	New Kids on the Block, Vol. 1	Sez on the Beat featuring various artists	
2022	Nayaab	Seedhe Maut and Sez on the Beat	
2022	Tez Filam	Ab-17 and Sez on the Beat	
2023	Meen	Yungsta and Sez on the Beat	
2023	Dev Nagri Aur Main	Dakait and Sez on the Beat	
2023	Eyes On The Prize	Karma and Sez on the Beat	
2024	Mr. Baawe	Ab-17 and Sez on the Beat	
2026	Enigma 2 Icon	Ikka	

=== Selected songs and screen-music credits ===
Selected songs and soundtrack work
Year	Title	Performing artist or production	Credit	Ref.
2013	"Yeh Mera Bombay"	Divine	Co-producer with RJV Ernesto	
2015	"Mere Gully Mein"	Divine and Naezy	Producer	
2016	"Jungli Sher"	Divine	Producer	
2016	"Asal Hustle"	Naezy	Producer	
2017	"Singakutty"	Solo	Composer	
2017	"Seedhe Maut Anthem"	Seedhe Maut	Composer, from the EP 2 Ka Pahada by Seedhe Maut	
2019	"Mere Gully Mein"	Gully Boy	Composer	
2019	"Die Romeo Die"	Tienas	Composer, from the album O by Tienas	
2020	"MMM"	Seedhe Maut	Released as two separate singles, music video contains both tracks	
2020	"Yaad"	Seedhe Maut	Released as two separate singles, music video contains both tracks	
2020	"Toofan Main"	Paatal Lok	Performer and producer with Prabh Deep	
2020	"My Jam"	SIRI and Sez on the Beat	Collaborative single	
2024	"Dhandho"	Munawar Faruqui, Spectra Music		
2024	Rest In Paradise	Ikka	From the album Only Love Gets Reply by Ikka	
2024	Cigarette	Ikka	From the album Only Love Gets Reply by Ikka	
2024	Jagga Jatt	Ikka, Diljit Dosanjh, Badshah	From the album Only Love Gets Reply by Ikka	
2024	Om	Ikka, Rawal	From the album Only Love Gets Reply by Ikka	
2024	"Torrie Wilson"	Paal Dabba and Sez on the Beat	Part of the third season of Red Bull 64 Bars series	
2024	"Mera Ghar Jamnapaar"	Ikka	From the web series Jamnapaar	
2026	"Naam Karu Bada"	Tu Yaa Main	With Adarsh Gourav	
2026	"Aala Flowpara"	Tu Yaa Main	With Adarsh Gourav, 100RBH and Riya Nambiar	

== Awards and nominations ==
Awards and nominations
Year	Award	Category	Nominee	Result	Ref.
2020	MTV Europe Music Awards	Best India Act	SIRI and Sez on the Beat	Nominated	
2022	7th Radio City Freedom Awards	Best Music Video	Seedhe Maut and Sez on the Beat	Won	
