= Solo (soundtrack) =

2017 soundtrack album

Soundtrack album by Various artists
- Released: 27 September 2017
- Recorded: 2016–2017
- Genre: Feature film soundtrack
- Languages: Malayalam; Tamil
- Label: Trend Music

Solo is the soundtrack to the 2017 Indian anthology film of the same name released in Malayalam and Tamil. Directed by Bejoy Nambiar, Solo consists of four shorter films in the anthology and was shot simultaneously in Tamil and Malayalam. Composers who worked on the film are Prashant Pillai, Thaikkudam Bridge, Masala Coffee, Gaurav Godkhindi, Agam, Filter Coffee, Brodha V, TaalAtma, Abhinav Bhansal, Sooraj Kurup and Sez on the Beat. The album has 22 songs in Malayalam, Tamil, Hindi and English. The whole soundtrack lasts about an hour.

== Track listing ==
=== World of Shekhar ===
Tamil

Solo - World of Shekhar's ensemble soundtrack comprises four tracks by various artists.

No.	Title	Lyrics	Music	Singer(s)	Length
1.	"Singa Kutty - Bring on the Chaos"	Chinna Ponnu, Ankur "Enkor" Johar, Raghav Jock	Sez on the Beat	Chinna Ponnu, Ankur "Enkor" Johar, Raghav Jock	2:53
2.	"Thoovaanam"	Kutti Revathi	Abhinav Bansal	Vijay Yesudas	3:23
3.	"Dhevadhai Pol Oruthi"	Mohan Raj	Agam	Harish Sivaramakrishnan	4:02
4.	"Uyiraagi"	Mohan Raj	Agam	Shashaa Tirupati	3:06

Malayalam

Solo - World of Shekhar's ensemble soundtrack comprises four tracks by various artists.

No.	Title	Lyrics	Music	Singer(s)	Length
1.	"Singa Kutty - Bring on the Chaos"	Chinnaponnu, Ankur "Enkor" Johar, Raghav Jock	Sez on the Beat	Chinna Ponnu, Ankur "Enkor" Johar, Raghav Jock	2:53
2.	"Kandu Nee Enne"	Dhanya Suresh	Abhinav Bansal	Vijay Yesudas	3:27
3.	"Oru Vanchi Paattu"	Agam	Agam	Harish Sivaramakrishnan	3:57
4.	"Thaalolam"	Manu Manjith	Agam	Shashaa Tirupati	3:32

=== World of Trilok ===
Solo - Trilok

Soundtrack album by Various Artists
- Released: 3 October 2017
- Genre: Feature film soundtrack
- Label: TrendMusic

Solo - World of Trilok's ensemble soundtrack comprises four tracks by various artists.

No.	Title	Lyrics	Music	Singer(s)	Length
1.	"Sajan More - Reprise (Unchained)"		Masala Coffee	Aditya Rao, Shriram Sampath, Jahnvi Shrimankar	3:12
2.	"Separation"		Govind	Ashita Ajit	2:10
3.	"Shiva Omkara"		Govind	Bindu Nambiar	2:35
4.	"Karaiyaadhe"	Mohan Raj	Gaurav Godkhindi	Siddharth Basrur	3:40
5.	"You"	Gaurav Godkhindi	Gaurav Godkhindi	Siddharth Basrur	3:40
6.	"The Cyclist Theme"	—	Gaurav Godkhindi	—	2:46

=== World of Siva ===
Solo - Siva

Soundtrack album by Various Artists
- Released: 5 September 2017
- Genre: Feature film soundtrack
- Length: 19:30
- Label: TrendMusic

Solo - World of Siva's ensemble soundtrack comprises four tracks by various artists.

No.	Title	Lyrics	Music	Singer(s)	Length
1.	"Aal Ayaal"	—	Masala Coffee	Sooraj Santhosh, Varun Sunil	4:21
2.	"Aal Ayaal - Reprise (Walk & Kill Mix)"	—	Masala Coffee	Sooraj Santhosh, Varun Sunil	3:09
3.	"Aigiri Nandini - Eye For An Eye"	Dhanya Suresh	Thaikkudam Bridge	Govind Menon, Meera	6:03
4.	"Shiv Taandav"	—	Ragini Bhagwat; Govind Menon	Saylee Talwalkar	5:57

=== World of Rudra ===
Solo - Rudra

Soundtrack album by Various Artists
- Released: 13 September 2017
- Genre: Feature film soundtrack
- Length: 14:53
- Label: TrendMusic

Solo - World of Rudra's ensemble soundtrack comprises four tracks by various artists.

No.	Title	Lyrics	Music	Singer(s)	Length
1.	"Roshomon (Tamil)"	Mohan Raj	Prashant Pillai	Ashwin Gopakumar, Arun Kamath, Niranj Suresh, Sachin Raj, Rakesh Kishore, Alfred Eby Issac	2:50
2.	"Roshomon (Malayalam)"	Harinarayanan	Prashant Pillai	Ashwin Gopakumar, Arun Kamath, Niranj Suresh, Sachin Raj, Rakesh Kishore, Alfred Eby Issac, Mithun Jayraj	2:50
3.	"Sajan More Ghar Aaye"	Traditional	Filter Coffee	Jahnvi Shrimankar	4:24
4.	"Sita Kalyanam"	Sangeeth Ravindran, Sooraj S. Kurup	Sooraj S. Kurup	Renuka Arun, Sooraj S. Kurup	4:47
5.	"Women of Solo (English)"	Gaurav Godkhindi	Gaurav Godkhindi	Sidharth Basrur	1:44

== Reception ==
Firstpost stated "this album evidently has more than just one layer" and "though the Solo playlists combined last for almost an hour, many of the songs in them are worth your time". Manorama Online called the album "highly addictive", adding the songs "belong to the fusion genre and make for a pleasant listening experience".
