= Khalbali Records =

- Promotional release poster
- Genre: Musical; Drama
- Written by: Prateek Arora; Priyanka Setia; Karan Vyas; Sameer Saral Sharma
- Directed by: Devanshu Singh
- Starring: Ram Kapoor; Saloni Khanna; Saloni Batra; Skand Thakur; Prabh Deep
- Composer: Amit Trivedi
- Country of origin: India
- Original language: Hindi
- No. of episodes: 8

Production
- Cinematography: Archit Patel
- Camera setup: Multi-camera
- Running time: 29-45 mins
- Production company: Colosceum Media

Original release
- Network: JioCinema
- Release: 12 September 2024

Khalbali Records is an Indian Hindi-language musical drama television series directed by Devanshu Singh. Produced by Colosceum Media, it stars Ram Kapoor, Saloni Khanna, Saloni Batra, Skand Thakur and Prabh Deep. The series premiered on JioCinema on 12 September 2024.

== Cast ==
- Ram Kapoor as Mavendra Rai Singh
- Saloni Khanna
- Saloni Batra as Ananya Rai Singh
- Skand Thakur
- Prabh Deep as Mauj
- Sanghmitra Hitaishi as Monali
- Mukesh S. Bhatt as Mishra
- Zander Lama as Ninja
- Suchitra Pillai as Ramona Krishnamoorthy

== Production ==
The series was announced by Colosceum Media. The principal photography of the series was wrapped in 2022. The series teaser was released on 27 August 2024, followed by the trailer on 2 September 2024.

== Soundtrack ==
Khalbali Records

Soundtrack album by Amit Trivedi and Azadi Records
- Released: September 5, 2024
- Genre: Soundtrack
- Length: 67:00
- Language: Hindi
- Label: Viacom 18 Media Private Limited

The music for Khalbali Records is composed by Amit Trivedi and Azadi Records.

Track listing
No.	Title	Singer(s)	Length
1.	"Tham Ja"	Prabh Deep	05:12
2.	"Fatafat Naam"	EPR	03:45
3.	"Naam Ninja"	Yungsta	04:10
4.	"Tu Hi Tu"	Sanjana Devarajan, Piyush Kapoor	04:30
5.	"Astitva"	EPR	03:50
6.	"Call Centre"	EPR	04:00
7.	"Majbur Mazdur"	Prabh Deep	03:55
8.	"Lal Sawaari"	Yungsta	04:05
9.	"Supernova"	Sumedha Sharma	04:20
10.	"Soche Ki Bandeyaa"	Shehnaz Akhtar, EPR	04:15
11.	"Rap Battle - Tashan Vs Ninja"	Yungsta, Piyush Kapoor	04:25
12.	"Pyaar Besharam - Male"	Shahid Mallya	04:10
13.	"Pyaar Besharam - Female"	Lisa Mishra	04:05
14.	"Cypher I"	Prabh Deep, Smoke, Agsy	04:00
15.	"Cypher II"	Agsy, Huzur	04:10
16.	"Barf Ko Aag Lagi Thi Us Roz - Poem"	Ahmer	03:55
17.	"Reaching For The Sun"	Pratika	04:00
18.	"Bolo Na"	Himani Kapoor, Ahmer	04:05
19.	"Purani Dilli"	Yungsta	04:10
20.	"Dhoondh Le"	Ahmer	04:00
Total length:			67:00

== Reception ==
Vinamra Mathur of Firstpost awarded the series 2 1/2 out of five stars. Shubhra Gupta of The Indian Express gave the series 3/5 stars. Troy Ribeiro of The Free Press Journal rated the series three-and-a-half out of five stars.
