= Prabh Deep =

Indian rapper, singer, songwriter and music producer (born 1993)

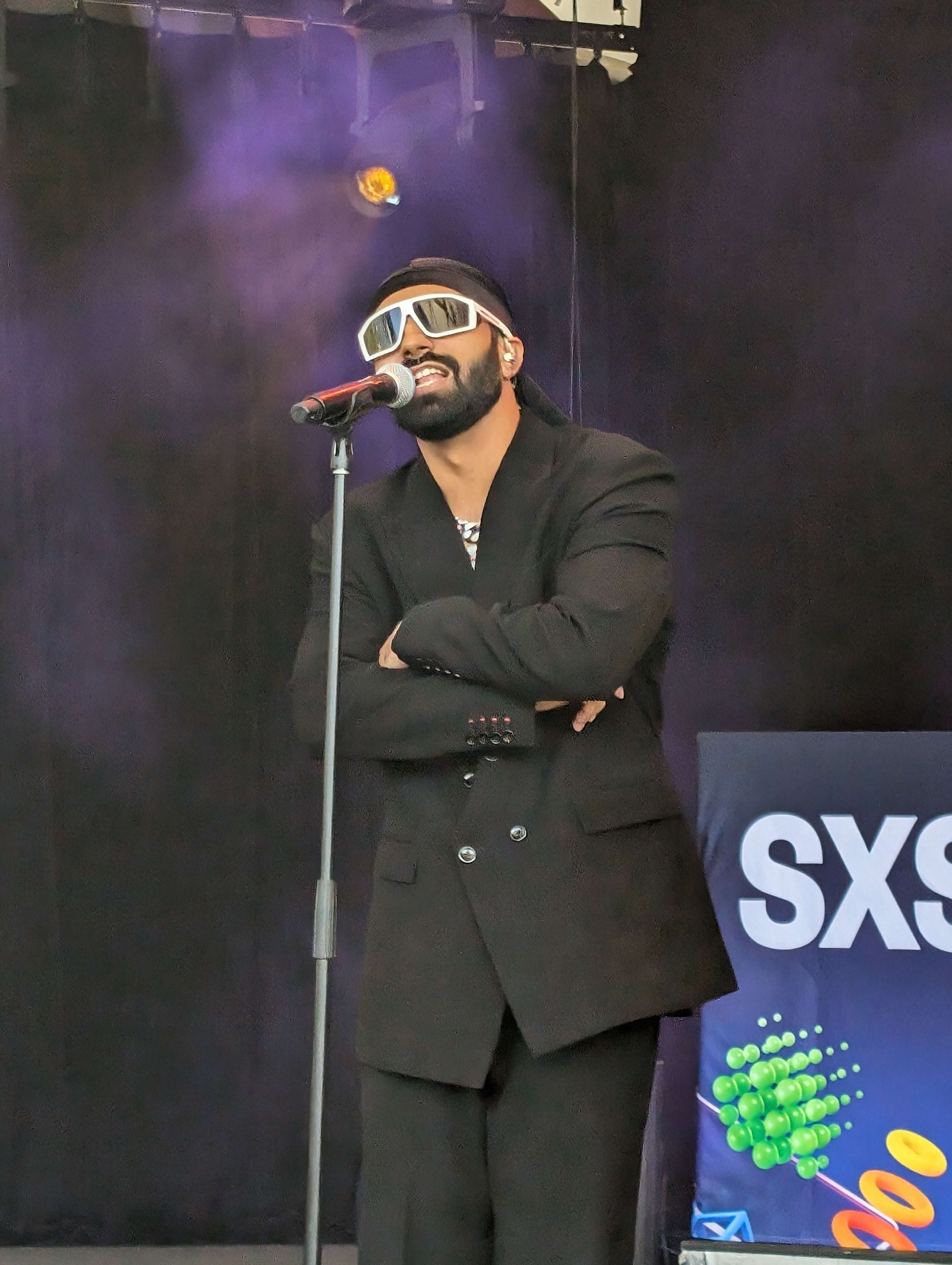
- Prabh Deep at SXSW Sydney, October 2024
- Born: Prabhdeep Sagar Singh; 26 December 1993 (age 32); Tilak Nagar, Delhi, India
- Occupations: Rapper; Songwriter; Music producer
- Years active: 2017–present
- Musical career
- Genres: Punjabi; Hip-Hop; Desi hip hop; Underground music
- Label: Azadi Records
- Website: Prabh Deep Music

Prabhdeep Singh (born 26 December 1993), better known by his stage name, Prabh Deep, is an Indian rapper, songwriter and music producer. He gained recognition in the Indian music industry after the release of his debut album Class-Sikh which debuted at number 2 on iTunes India albums chart and quickly ranked up to number 1 by the end of the year.

== Early life ==
Prabh Deep was born on 26 December 1993 in the West Delhi suburb of Tilak Nagar to a Sikh family. His mother, Jaswinder Kaur, was a small-scale businesswoman. His father, Manmohan Singh, had lost his father and four brothers during a killing spree by angry mobs during the 1984 riots in Nangloi Jat, and developed addictions while struggling with the post-traumatic stress. The family was, therefore, supported by the earnings through the hair salon run by Prabh Deep's mother.

Prabh Deep decided to drop out of high school right before his 12th standard board examination on account of the pointlessness of the Indian education system. His mother supported his decision to quit school to build his own path in music.

The increasing financial troubles of the family, as well as bullying in school, eventually got him involved in a street gang, partaking in streetfights, petty jobs such as selling second-hand phones and motorbikes at a mark-up and acting as a middleman for money lenders. Later on, he also had a short stint as a salesman at a garment shop and as a call centre executive for three years before pursuing a full-time career in music.

== Career ==
=== 2008: Career beginnings ===
Around the summer of 2008, Prabh Deep and his childhood friend Happu witnessed a dance crew performing stunts in a park. Impressed by the urban dance form, he and Happu joined a hip-hop dance group in the neighbouring area of Vikaspuri and spent the next few years practising b-boying. While continuing his jobs as a call centre executive and salesman, Prabh Deep maintained close contact with the Delhi hip-hop circuit while undergoing a slow transition from a dancer to an emcee.

=== 2015-2019: Debut album, Azadi Records and Bollywood ===
Through rapper Zan Twoshadez and hip-hop culture researcher Jaspal Singh, Prabh Deep was introduced to the open mic nights and similar events in Delhi that laid the foundation of his rapping career. In 2015, Prabh Deep connected with indie music producer Sez on the Beat on Facebook and began co-producing music. Sez signed him to the indie record Azadi Records. The entirety of Class-Sikh was produced in Sez's home studio. According to NPR Music, Class-Sikh focused on various themes, including an honest portrayal from a Sikh's perspective of the 1984 riots that followed then- president Indira Gandhi's death. Released on October 16, 2017, it was one of the first Indian hip-hop albums to debut at number 2 on iTunes India albums chart and quickly ranked up to number 1 by the end of the year.

Prabh Deep marked his entry in Bollywood with his song "Sherni" for Anurag Kashyap's 2018 drama Manmarziyaan. The following year, Prabh Deep released his self-produced debut EP, K I N G.

=== 2020-present: Tabia, departure from Azadi Records and further successes ===
He also wrote and performed the song "Toofan Main" for the original soundtrack of the Amazon Prime crime series Paatal Lok.

The year 2021 marked the release of his sophomore album, Tabia. Prabh Deep had been working on the album since 2019, even visiting Karma Studios in Thailand to work on the album. Akshay Kapoor of The Indian Music Diaries describes the album as Prabh's "Bildungsroman" while Sean D of LiFTED Asia described it as a "concept driven album that explores themes of multiplicities within oneself". It also became the first Indian hip-hop album to be reviewed by Pitchfork.

In 2022, he released his third album, Bhram. In 2023, he released his surprise collaborative EP with Raftaar, PRAA, as well as the deluxe version of his third studio album, Bhram, featuring guest appearances from fellow Azadi Records signees Seedhe Maut and Ahmer, and Raftaar, Ikka, and GD-47. This also marked his last release with the label, and soon after, he departed from the label. He also appeared on the 2023 season of Coke Studio Bharat, performing the song "Taqdeer" alongside Rashmeet Kaur, Donn Bhat & Sakur Khan Sufi. In November 2023, he was chosen as a supporting act for American rapper 50 Cent's show in Mumbai, as part of The Final Lap Tour, alongside rappers Divine, Yung Raja and SVDP, however, Divine's performance was canceled at the last minute due to technical difficulties.

In 2024, he released the sequel to his debut EP, KING Returns, and also collaborated with John Jacobs for his new eyewear line, The Turban Edit Collection. In the same year, he released his debut mixtape, DSP, featuring Faris Shafi, Dhanji, GD-47 and Sickflip, among others. He made his screen debut with JioCinema's Khalbali Records, alongside fellow rappers like Ahmer, Agsy, EPR Iyer and Yungsta and also contributed to the soundtrack of the series.

In 2025, he contributed to the soundtrack of the web-series, Do You Wanna Partner, on the track, "Hum Dum". In January 2026, Prabh Deep announced his next project, Santali, under which he aimed to release one track every week for 47 weeks. He cited the difficulties he faced in the past 47 weeks as the core inspiration for the project. The tracks also included collaborations, most notably with Benny Dayal, Fateh and Raga.

== Artistry ==
=== Influences ===
Prabh Deep cites Eminem and Dr. Dre as his idols.

=== Themes and genres ===
Prabh Deep is described as an innovative lyricist whose music has socially conscious origins. Throughout his album Class-Sikh, his music revolved around the hidden, grimy underbelly scenery of suburbs of Delhi. For his album Class-Sikh, he picked up various bits and pieces from his personal experiences including the story of his childhood friend Abu's fall into drug addiction, crime and eventually murder. His music is described as slang-inflected with bits of Punjabi, Hindi and English. His song "Suno" narrates the complex and unfortunate education system of India that leads to suicides and drug overdoses by the youth in India. He also discussed issues like 2019–2021 Jammu and Kashmir lockdown in "Elaan", violence-instigating politics by the governments of global superpowers including the US and India in "King" and the violence and brutalities of the hidden underbelly of Delhi in "Toofan Main". "Amar" is an introspective track, with him talking about preparing for death and his soul's immortality through his art. His critically-acclaimed track "Chitta", revolves around a character representing Prabh Deep himself, and his interactions in a world ruled by the corrupt, the wealthy and the powerful; as well as the deep-rooted problems in India's neighbourhoods. His album Tabia explores the themes of self discovery, spiritual awakening, pride and humility.

== Discography ==
=== Film music ===
Year	Film / Series	Song	Artist(s)
2018	Manmarziyaan	Sherni	Prabh Deep
2020	Paatal Lok	Toofan Main	Prabh Deep & Sez on the Beat
2024	Khalbali Records	Tham Ja	Prabh Deep
2024	Khalbali Records	Majbur Mazdur	Prabh Deep
2025	Do You Wanna Partner	Hum Dum	Prabh Deep, Vasu Raina

=== Albums and EPs ===
Year	Album / EP	Track	Artist(s)	Produced by
2017	Class-Sikh	Intro	Prabh Deep & Sez on the Beat	Sez on the Beat
2017	Class-Sikh	Suno	Prabh Deep & Sez on the Beat	Sez on the Beat
2017	Class-Sikh	I don't Care	Prabh Deep & Sez on the Beat	Sez on the Beat
2017	Class-Sikh	Abu	Prabh Deep & Sez on the Beat	Sez on the Beat
2017	Class-Sikh	Click Clack	Prabh Deep & Sez on the Beat	Sez on the Beat
2017	Class-Sikh	Kal (Future)	Prabh Deep & Sez on the Beat	Sez on the Beat
2017	Class-Sikh	Kal	Prabh Deep & Sez on the Beat	Sez on the Beat
2017	Class-Sikh	G Maane	Prabh Deep & Sez on the Beat	Sez on the Beat
2017	Class-Sikh	Bullshit	Prabh Deep & Sez on the Beat	Sez on the Beat
2017	Class-Sikh	Murder	Prabh Deep & Sez on the Beat	Sez on the Beat
2017	Class-Sikh	Oye Oye	Prabh Deep & Sez on the Beat	Sez on the Beat
2017	Class-Sikh	Classsikh	Prabh Deep & Sez on the Beat	Sez on the Beat
2019	K I N G	Maya	Prabh Deep ft. Archit Anand & Hashbass	Prabh Deep
2019	K I N G	Kala	Prabh Deep	Prabh Deep
2019	K I N G	Amar	Prabh Deep	Prabh Deep
2019	K I N G	Khat	Prabh Deep	Prabh Deep
2019	K I N G	Hira	Prabh Deep	Prabh Deep
2019	K I N G	King	Prabh Deep	Prabh Deep
2021	Tabia	Tabia	Prabh Deep	Prabh Deep
2021	Tabia	Qafir	Prabh Deep	Prabh Deep
2021	Tabia	Paapi	Prabh Deep	Prabh Deep
2021	Tabia	Preet	Prabh Deep	Prabh Deep & Lambo Drive
2021	Tabia	Taqat	Prabh Deep	Prabh Deep & IDEK?
2021	Tabia	Alope	Prabh Deep ft. Zan Twoshadez	Prabh Deep, Tienas, RaySon4 7 & Zero Chill
2021	Tabia	Antar	Prabh Deep	Richard Craker
2021	Tabia	Abaad	Prabh Deep ft. SYPS	Richard Craker
2021	Tabia	Qaabu	Prabh Deep	Prabh Deep & Lambo Drive
2021	Tabia	Huqum	Prabh Deep	Richard Craker
2021	Tabia	Babur	Prabh Deep	Richard Craker
2021	Tabia	Waqaf	Prabh Deep	Prabh Deep
2021	Tabia	Gyani	Prabh Deep	Richard Craker
2021	Tabia	Sthir	Prabh Deep	Prabh Deep
2021	Tabia	Safar	Prabh Deep	Prabh Deep
2022	Bhram	Paisa	Prabh Deep	Prabh Deep
2022	Bhram	Shaurat	Prabh Deep	Prabh Deep & Lambo Drive
2022	Bhram	Rishte	Prabh Deep	Prabh Deep
2022	Bhram	Nafrat	Prabh Deep ft. SYPS	Prabh Deep & EMi EMi
2022	Bhram	Izzat	Prabh Deep	Prabh Deep
2022	Bhram	Khayal	Prabh Deep	Prabh Deep
2022	Bhram	Inayat	Prabh Deep	Prabh Deep
2022	Bhram	Tajurba	Prabh Deep	Prabh Deep & Lambo Drive
2023	PRAA	ABBU	Raftaar & Prabh Deep	Tonybasu
2023	PRAA	BADNAAM	Raftaar & Prabh Deep	Lambo Drive
2023	PRAA	HELLO	Raftaar & Prabh Deep	Anywaywell
2023	PRAA	TRAP PRAA	Raftaar & Prabh Deep	Umair
2023	Bhram (Deluxe)	Paisa	Prabh Deep	Prabh Deep
2023	Bhram (Deluxe)	Sukoon	Prabh Deep ft. GD 47 & Encore ABJ	Prabh Deep
2023	Bhram (Deluxe)	Shaurat	Prabh Deep	Prabh Deep & Lambo Drive
2023	Bhram (Deluxe)	Rishte	Prabh Deep	Prabh Deep
2023	Bhram (Deluxe)	Nafrat	Prabh Deep ft. SYPS	Prabh Deep & EMi EMi
2023	Bhram (Deluxe)	Izzat	Prabh Deep	Prabh Deep
2023	Bhram (Deluxe)	Samaaj	Prabh Deep ft. Ikka	Prabh Deep
2023	Bhram (Deluxe)	Shaitaan	Prabh Deep ft. Calm	Prabh Deep
2023	Bhram (Deluxe)	Khayal	Prabh Deep	Prabh Deep
2023	Bhram (Deluxe)	Inayat	Prabh Deep ft. Ahmer	Prabh Deep
2023	Bhram (Deluxe)	Sagar	Prabh Deep ft. Scuti	Prabh Deep
2023	Bhram (Deluxe)	Tajurba	Prabh Deep ft. Raftaar	Prabh Deep, Baajewala & Lambo Drive
2023	Bhram (Deluxe)	Wapas	Prabh Deep	Prabh Deep
2024	KING Returns	Yaadan	Prabh Deep	Prabh Deep
2024	KING Returns	Babaji	Prabh Deep	Prabh Deep
2024	KING Returns	Girgit	Prabh Deep	Prabh Deep
2024	KING Returns	Daang	Prabh Deep	Prabh Deep
2024	KING Returns	Ethe Rakh	Prabh Deep	Prabh Deep
2024	KING Returns	Bachpan	Prabh Deep	Prabh Deep
2024	DSP	Daang V1	Prabh Deep	Prabh Deep
2024	DSP	Ustaadi	Prabh Deep ft. Faris Shafi	Scuti
2024	DSP	Zum!!!	Prabh Deep ft. Big Calo, SYPS	LLoke
2024	DSP	8-FIGGAAH!	Prabh Deep ft. GD47	SYPS
2024	DSP	O.T.M	Prabh Deep ft. Alistair Alvin, KAEM, Dhanji	Prabh Deep, Scuti
2024	DSP	Rapha	Prabh Deep ft. Scuti	Scuti, SYPS
2024	DSP	Wajood	Prabh Deep ft. Scuti	Scuti
2024	DSP	Hood-Robin	Prabh Deep ft. Scuti	Scuti
2024	DSP	Veer-G	Prabh Deep ft. Sickflip	Sickflip

=== Singles and collaborations ===
Year	Track	Artist(s)	Produced by	Note(s)
2015	Chi Chi	Prabh Deep ft. MC Heam		
2015	Capital Punishment - New Delhi Cypher	Raga, Marco, KeepSake, KrazyClip, Slyck, Yungsta & Prabh Deep	Sez on the Beat	
2015	Feel Me	Prabh Deep	Sez on the Beat	
2015	Time and Age	Slyck Twoshadez	Prabh Deep	
2016	Forever Grateful	Slyck Twoshadez ft. Prabh Deep	Prabh Deep	From the mixtape PharmaSlyck by Slyck Twoshadez
2016	Loco	Prabh Deep & Calm		From the New Delhi Mixtape - Khatarnaak
2016	Hip Hop Is A School	Prabh Deep & Sun-j (Agnastik)		From the New Delhi Mixtape - Khatarnaak
2016	Ilaka	MC Heam & Prabh Deep		From the New Delhi Mixtape - Khatarnaak
2017	Classsikh Maut	Seedhe Maut, Prabh Deep & Sez on the Beat	Sez on the Beat	From the EP 2 Ka Pahada by Seedhe Maut
2017	Suede Gully	Divine, Prabh Deep, Khasi Bloodz & Madurai Souljour		Promotional song for Puma
2018	Class-Sikh Maut, Vol. II	Prabh Deep, Seedhe Maut & Sez on the Beat	Sez on the Beat	
2018	Vekhi Ja	Prabh Deep & Sez on the Beat	Sez on the Beat	
2018	Sauce	Prabh Deep, Sez on the Beat & Lit Happu	Sez on the Beat	
2019	K.O.	Prabh Deep & Sez on the Beat	Sez on the Beat	
2019	Cyclone	Tienas & Prabh Deep	Harman	From the album O by Tienas
2019	Elaan	Ahmer, Sez on the Beat & Prabh Deep	Sez on the Beat	From the album Little Kid, Big Dreams by Ahmer & Sez on the Beat
2019	Coolie	Sarathy Korwar ft. Delhi Sultanate & Prabh Deep		From the album More Arriving by Sarathy Korwar
2019	Only My Name	Smokey The Ghost ft. Prabh Deep	Sez on the Beat	
2019	Tofa	Prabh Deep	Prabh Deep	
2019	Fly	Prabh Deep	Prabh Deep	Featured in the compilation Vibe Presents: Urban Asia, Vol. 3
2020	Pandemic	Prabh Deep	Prabh Deep	
2020	Chitta	Prabh Deep	Prabh Deep	
2020	Chitta (Remix)	Prabh Deep ft. Yung Raja	Prabh Deep	
2021	Ateet	Prabh Deep	Prabh Deep	
2022	Dosh	Prabh Deep	Prabh Deep	
2023	Taqdeer	Prabh Deep, Rashmeet Kaur, Donn Bhat & Sakur Khan Sufi	Donn Bhat & Ankur Tewari	From the first season of Coke Studio Bharat
2023	THAPPAD!	Prabh Deep	Fantom	
2024	NALLA NERAM	Yung Raja, Prabh Deep	RIIDEM, Flo Moser	
2025	FIZA	Prabh Deep	Scuti	
2025	Diwani	Prabh Deep	Scuti	
2026	Vaade	Prabh Deep	Scuti	
