= Saloni Batra =

Indian actress

- Born: Saloni Batra; 25 November 1987 (age 38); Delhi, India
- Education: National Institute of Fashion Technology Chennai
- Occupations: Actress; singer
- Relatives: Karan Batra (Brother)

Saloni Batra (born on 29 November 1987) is an Indian actress who works in Hindi films.

== Early and personal life ==
Saloni Batra was born in Delhi, India. She graduated with a Bachelors of Fashion Technology from the National Institute of Fashion Technology Chennai.

== Filmography ==
Year	Title	Role	Notes
2013	The Unnamed Crime		Short film
2016	The Legend of Michael Mishra		
2016	Life Sahi Hai	Neha	Television series
2017	Love at First Sight		Short film
2018	Soni	Kalpana	
2018	White Matter	Rhea	Television series
2019	Parchhayee: Ghost Stories by Ruskin Bond	Simran	Television series
2020	Taish	Sanobar Brar	
2021	The Knot	Geeta Mathur	
2021	200 Halla Ho	Purva	
2023	Animal	Reet Singh	
2024	Gaanth Chapter 1: Jamnaa Paar	Satyawati Mittal	Television series
2024	Khalbali Records	Ananya Rai Singh	
2025	Murderbaad	Shaili Pandey	
2025	Bhay: The Gaurav Tiwari Mystery	Megha	Web series
