= Gully rap =

Genre of hip-hop music

Example of gully rap

Gully rap is an emerging genre of hip-hop music that originated from Mumbai. It has since spread across India. Inspired by American rappers like Tupac, The Notorious B.I.G. and Nas, the music discusses the street life in distinct Hindu-Urdu rhythm and cadence. Gully means "narrow lane" in Hindi. Emiway Bantai, DIVINE and Naezy are artists that are considered at the forefront of the genre. It stands in contrast to mainstream desi rap or Bollywood which focus on more superficial aspects of life (e.g. partying, alcohol). By contrast, gully rap has a socio-political emphasis.

Gully rap has been an outlet for underprivileged youth and has been used as a tool for activism. Incorporating the fundamentals of US hip-hop, the rappers were able to express their emotions regarding their daily lives and frustrations. They were able to do so with minimal costs. No formal training is required. Chinese smartphones, cheap data packages, and free online platforms like YouTube have been used. This represents the Indian philosophy of jugaad. Although some artists are signed to music labels, the majority are independent. They are primary promoted through word of mouth. Rappers set up a microphone and speakers on the street and rap for free to audiences.

Hip-hop culture had been present in Mumbai for over decade before gully rap became popular. The rap started off as a derivative of American rap, but within a few years became original and become mainstream. Rappers would post rap battles on a social media networking site called Orkut, which is now defunct. Originally, the language was English, but then a turning point occurred when the rappers used local Bambaiyya slang as well other languages (e.g. Hindi, Marathi, Tamil or Konkani). In 2015, "Mere Gully Mein" performed by DIVINE featuring Naezy was released, and its success marked the first time the genre hit the mainstream.

The 2019 Bollywood film Gully Boy tracks the story of an aspiring rapper from the slums of Mumbai. VICE made a documentary called Kya Bolta Bantai discussing the emergence of the genre. Another documentary called Gully Life follows the rags-to-riches story of DIVINE.

== See also ==
- Indian hip-hop
- Naezy
