= Divine (rapper) =

Indian rapper and songwriter (born 1990)

DIVINE
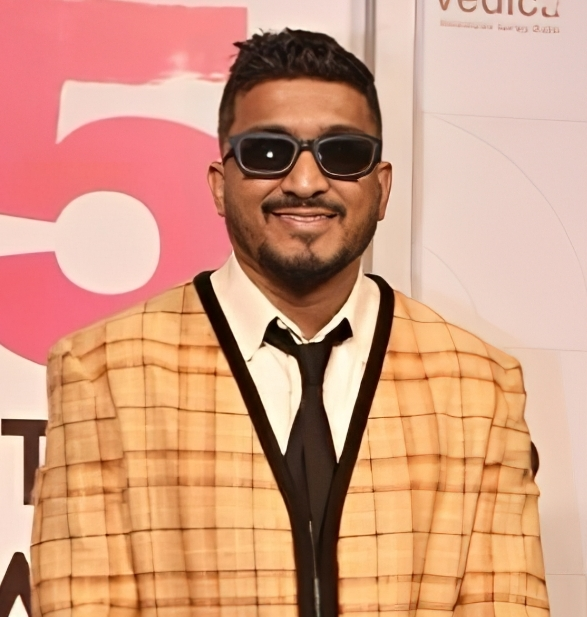
- Divine at an event held by GQ India in 2023

Background information
- Born: Vivian Wilson Fernandes; 2 October 1990 (age 36); Andheri, Mumbai, India
- Genres: Gully rap; hip hop
- Occupations: Rapper; songwriter
- Years active: 2010–present
- Labels: Gully Gang; Sony Music India; Mass Appeal Records India; Universal

Vivian Wilson Fernandes (born 2 October 1990), known professionally as Divine (stylized in all caps), is an Indian rapper and songwriter. He is credited as one of the pioneers of the Indian hip-hop scene and for bringing it to mainstream attention. His lyrics often reflect his experiences growing up in the chawls of Mumbai, focusing on themes such as street life, struggles, and aspirations.

Divine started gaining popularity after the release of his single "Yeh Mera Bombay" in 2013. He broke through with the release of "Mere Gully Mein" in 2015, which featured fellow Mumbai-based rapper Naezy.

On 12 December 2020, Divine became the first Indian rapper to be featured on Spotify Times Square billboard in New York City for his album Punya Paap (2020), which had claimed the top spot on Apple Music India. He made his debut at the 64th Annual Grammy Awards in 2022 becoming the first Indian hip-hop artist to attend the Grammys.

His third studio album, Gunehgar, was released in 2022, which was preceded by the hit single "Baazigar" featuring American rapper Armani White. Further, Divine went on to release his next multi-track project in the form of a collaborative album with Punjabi singer Karan Aujla, titled Street Dreams. He further released his fourth solo studio album, Walking on Water, in 2026.

== Early life ==
Vivian Wilson Fernandes was born on 2 October 1990 in Andheri, Bombay, India, to a Goan mother based in Qatar. He hails from a Christian family.

== Career ==
=== Early years and influences ===
Divine started his career as an underground rapper in 2011 after discovering hip-hop through a T-shirt of 50 Cent's first album Get Rich or Die Tryin', that a friend of his wore at school. The same friend gave him his first MP3 CD with hip-hop music on it which inspired him to start rapping in English. He soon became a part of the hip hop crew Mumbai's Finest. He often raps about his own life experiences, such as the life of the poor people in Mumbai and his upbringing with a single mother. He cites American rappers such as Nas, Eminem, Big L, Tupac, 50 Cent, and Rakim as his influences.

=== 2014–2016: Rise to success ===
Following the release of his song "Yeh Mera Bombay", Divine grabbed the attention of Sony Music India while performing at the Blue Frog Festival 2014 in Mumbai, and shortly after, signed a contract with them. The song later won the Best Video of the Year award at Rolling Stone India Awards the same year. The following year, he released his breakout single "Mere Gully Mein" featuring Naezy in April. The song went viral and many Bollywood celebrities shared it on social media. He collaborated with Indian DJ Nucleya on the track "Jungle Raja" from Nucleya's album Bass Rani, which released in the same year, further helping him gain more popularity. The song won Best EDM Track of the Year at the GiMA Awards in 2016.

On 24 March 2016, his debut solo single "Jungli Sher" was released. He performed the song on the Breakfast Show on 29 April 2016 and subsequently, appeared on the BBC Asian Network on the Charlie Sloth Show, becoming the first Hindi-speaking rapper to freestyle on the show and also the first to rap in Hindi with the name-giving host in attendance. He was also featured on Brapp TV.

=== 2017–2019: Film contributions, departure from Sony Music India and debut album ===
Divine collaborated with Nucleya on another hit track, "Scene Kya Hai" off Nucleya's album Raja Baja. He was featured on "Daru Daru" with Deep Jandu and Gangis Khan, his first commercially oriented song, which came out on 10 January 2017. His next solo single, "Farak", was released on 16 February 2017 and topped the Indipop charts on iTunes India. He appeared as a feature on the single "City Slums" by Indian-American rapper/singer/songwriter Raja Kumari in May 2017. "City Slums" was further certified triple platinum in India by IMI. Divine made his Bollywood debut in the film Mukkabaaz with the song "Paintra". The track was his second collaboration with Nucleya and was released on 1 December 2017.

In 2018, Divine terminated his contract with Sony Music India. He released a remix to Lil Pump's "Gucci Gang" called "Gully Gang" independently on 18 January 2018. The song was perceived well by both critics and fans and helped him garner more attention. He collaborated with Indian music director and singer Amit Trivedi for the Irrfan Khan-starring film Blackmail on the song "Badla", which was released on 16 March 2018 via T-Series. Divine also contributed to the soundtrack for Sacred Games, an Indian Netflix original series. It featured his song "Jungli Sher" as well as "Kaam 25" produced by Indo-Canadian producer Phenom, which was made specifically for the series. Its music video was released on 14 June 2018 on both Divine's and Netflix's YouTube channels, with the version on Netflix featuring English subtitles. On 5 April 2018, he followed up with "One Side", produced by Byg Byrd. The video was produced by Red Bull Media House and released on the rapper's own YouTube channel.

His next single, "Teesri Manzil", earned him a copyright strike from Zee Music Company, a few hours after its release and was deleted from his channel. It was eventually re-released on 14 December 2018 with some changes in the lyrics. He released "Junoon", the intro to his debut album, on 10 November 2018. The album's name, Kohinoor, was announced on 13 February 2019 on Apple Music's Beats 1 radio show hosted by Ebro Darden. In July 2019, Divine released a documentary film about his career entitled Gully Life - The Story of Divine. It aired on TV channels such as the Discovery Channel and was released on Divine's YouTube channel a week later.

In 2019, Zoya Akhtar co-opted the story of him and Naezy, into a coming-of-age film, titled Gully Boy, portraying a struggle of an aspiring rapper and his surroundings that influence his journey, with actor Ranveer Singh, in the titular role. American rapper Nas served as an executive producer for the film. Divine and Naezy both helped as consultants to get an authentic representation of hip hop culture for the film. Their song "Mere Gully Mein" was remade with Ranveer Singh rapping Naezy's lyrics as part of the film. Divine provided additional rap lyrics for Ranveer Singh's character and composed some of the songs for the original soundtrack. The soundtrack for the film featured contributions from various hip-hop artists such as Divine, Naezy, Sez on the Beat, Rishi Rich, Dub Sharma, MC Altaf, MC TodFod, 100RBH, Maharya, Noxious D, Viveick Rajagopalan, and others. A promotional single for the film, "NY Se Mumbai", was released on 9 February 2019 and performed by Divine, Naezy and Ranveer Singh, along with American rapper Nas. The track was produced by XD Pro Music, a Toronto based producer duo, and Ill Wayno.

On 20 August 2019, Nas' Mass Appeal Records and Universal Music India launched Mass Appeal India and signed Divine. Universal Music Group and Mass Appeal jointly took the step to take him to India and globalize the Indian hip-hop scene. On 20 August 2019, an interview with Nas was published on Mass Appeal India's YouTube channel, and Universal Music India's Facebook Page, where Nas revealed that Divine's debut album Kohinoor was set to release soon. It was released on 9 October 2019 and featured all-new tracks recorded specifically for the album.

=== 2020–2021: Punya Paap, international collaborations and further successes ===
On 20 September 2020, Divine appeared on the international remix of "Bando Diaries" by UK rapper Dutchavelli, alongside OneFour from Australia, Noizy from Albania and Kekra from France. On 23 September 2020, he released his new song and video, "Punya Paap", on Mass Appeal India's YouTube channel. It was announced to be the first single off his second album, also entitled Punya Paap.

On 16 October 2020, he released "Mirchi", the second single from the album. The song with its prominent baile funk sound was well received. Another track from the album, "Mera Bhai", had its music video launched on 6 November 2020. The animated video portrays a story where one of Divine's childhood friends betrays him out of jealousy and ends with his message to the listeners to trust no one but themselves in today's world.

His sophomore album, Punya Paap, was released on 3 December 2020, under the label Mass Appeal India. It consists of 11 tracks, with features from Nas, Cocoa Sarai, Dutchavelli, Stylo G, D'Evil, MC Altaf, Lisa Mishra and Phenom. The album featured a blend of old-school 808 patterns and new heavy beats with a lot of sampled loops, produced by Stunnah Beatz, iLL Wayno, and Karan Kanchan. The album has an overall ominous theme, and chronicles Divine's struggles and rise to the top in the Indian hip-hop scene.

In 2021, GQ's global editions nominated a local artist across a world of genres and Divine was among the 21 most exciting young musicians. He appeared on a cover of the Metallica song "The Unforgiven" with Vishal Dadlani and Shor Police, for the charity tribute album The Metallica Blacklist, released in September 2021. He won the award for Best Indian Act at the MTV Europe Music Awards in November 2022.

=== 2022–present: Gunehgar, collaboration with Karan Aujla and Gully Fest ===
In November 2022, he released his third album, Gunehgar. The album prominently featured international artists and producers, including rappers Jadakiss, Russ and Armani White. The album launch show for Gunehgar, held at NSCI SVP Stadium in Mumbai with 8000+ attendees was widely regarded as amongst the most iconic musical concerts to be held in the country till date.

In 2023, he performed at the mid-innings show of 2023 IPL finals. He further went on to headline Lollapalooza India, VH1 Supersonic amongst other live festivals and self produced tours. He was also invited to Spotify Camp Nou by FC Barcelona and Spotify and was present for a Barcelona game as Camp Nou played his hit track "Baazigar". In November 2023, he was chosen as a supporting act for American rapper 50 Cent's show in Mumbai, as part of The Final Lap Tour, alongside rappers Prabh Deep, Yung Raja and SVDP. However, his performance was canceled at the last minute due to technical difficulties.

In 2024, Divine released his collaborative album with Karan Aujla, Street Dreams, preceded by the lead single, "100 Million". This went down in history as a first of its kind cross-region and multi-language collaborative album within the Indian hip-hop and independent music scene.

In November 2024, Divine, along with his company Gully Gang Entertainment went on to announce the Gully Fest 2024. Bringing in American rapper Pusha T, along with talented acts like Sambata, Prabh Deep, it was headlined by Divine himself.

In April 2025, Nas visited India again to perform at the Mass Appeal Presents: The World Reunion—A Charity Concert, hosted by Mass Appeal India, at The Nesco Center, in Mumbai. He was accompanied by various Indian-origin rappers, such as, Divine, Raftaar, Ikka, KR$NA, King, and Steel Banglez.

In September 2025, Divine announced his fourth studio album, Walking On Water, via his Instagram. Previously, he had released the singles "Aag" and "Rain", and after the announcement, he proceeded to release the track, "You & I", which was confirmed to be a part of his album. At the Rolling Loud India Festival, held on November 22 and 23, he also played unreleased tracks from the album. The album was officially announced through a teaser that was posted on Divine's YouTube channel on December 11, and the official tracklist was revealed on December 16. The album released on December 18, preceded by a listening party which was streamed on JioHotstar. The album featured guest appearances from Hanumankind, Gurinder Gill, MC Altaf, Sammohit, and Riar Saab, while the production was primarily handled by ZZORAWAR, Karan Kanchan and Stunnah Beatz. He further released the music video for "Saucy", starring actress Mouni Roy and Riar Saab, which was shot in Singapore.

== Gully Gang Entertainment ==
In February 2019, Divine announced the founding of a new company, Gully Gang Entertainment, a venture that includes a record label "Gully Gang Records", to recruit and produce hip-hop talent in the Mumbai area. He co-founded the company with Chaitanya Kataria. The song "Gully Gang Cypher" released on 22 May 2019 as the first collaboration of the label's artists such as the emerging rap quartet Aavrutti, solo hip-hop artists D’Evil, MC Altaf and Shah Rule with music producer Karan Kanchan. Gully Gang Records released their first compilation, Shutdown, in 2020. The project featured the label's signees, Divine, Shah Rule, D'Evil, MC Altaf, Aavrutti as well as guest appearances from KR$NA, Sikander Kahlon, Kaka Sady and 7Bantaiz. Artists from outside of Mumbai too have been signed, for instance, 100RBH from Amravati and Tsumyoki from Goa. Further, artists like Sammohit, Afkap, 99side and Deeking were signed to the label.

== Discography ==
=== Studio albums ===
Title	Details
Kohinoor	Released: October 9, 2019; Label: Mass Appeal India, Gully Gang; Format: CD, digital download, streaming
Punya Paap	Released: December 3, 2020; Label: Mass Appeal India, Gully Gang; Format: CD, digital download, streaming
Gunehgar	Released: November 10, 2022; Label: Mass Appeal India, Gully Gang; Format: CD, digital download, streaming
Walking on Water	Released: December 18, 2025; Label: Gully Gang; Format: CD, digital download, streaming

=== Collaborative albums ===
Title	Details	Peak chart positions	
Title	Details	CAN	NZ
Street Dreams (with Karan Aujla)	Released: 16 February 2024; Label: Mass Appeal India; Format: Digital download, streaming	22	27

=== Singles discography ===
==== As lead artist ====
Title	Year	Peak chart positions	Music	Songwriter (s)	Album
Title	Year	UK asian	Music	Songwriter (s)	Album
Voice of the Streets	2013				
Yeh Mera Bombay	2013		Rjv Ernesto & Sez on the Beat		
Bombay Rap Cypher 2014 (with Kav-e, Enkore, D'Evil & Poetik Justis)	2014		Sez on the Beat		
Mere Gully Mein (featuring Naezy)	2015		Sez on the Beat		
Jungli Sher	2016		Sez on the Beat		
Scene Kya Hai (with Phlorick, Nucleya)	2016		Nucleya		Raja Baja by Nucleya
Farak	2017		Phenom		
Gully Gang (Gucci Gang Remix)	2018		Cyrill Gabriel (Madbus Audio)		
One Side	2018		Byg Byrd		
Roots (featuring Raja Kumari)	2018		K-Major		
Teesri Manzil	2018		Phenom		
Junoon	2018		Phenom		Kohinoor
Jungli Sher (Hip Hop Remix) (with Nilesh P.)	2019				From The Dance Project (Season 1: Episode 7)
Kohinoor	2019		iLL Wayno	Divine, Benny Solomon	Kohinoor
Wallah (ft. Shah Rule)	2019		Xplicit & Phenom	Divine, Phenom, Xplicit	Kohinoor
Gandhi Money	2019		Phenom	Divine, Phenom	Kohinoor
Nas Interlude (Skit) (ft. Nas)	2019		Phenom	Divine, Nas, Phenom	Kohinoor
Vibe Hai (ft. Aavrutti, D'Evil & Shah Rule)	2019		NDS	Divine, D'Evil, NDS, Frenzzy, Saifan, Sammohit, Sledge, Shah Rule	Kohinoor
Chal Bombay	2019		Phenom & iLLWayno	Divine, iLL Wayno, Phenom	Kohinoor
Remand (ft. Dave East)	2019		Phenom	Divine, Dave East, Phenom	Kohinoor
Too Hype (ft. Sid Sriram & Sanjoy)	2019		Sanjoy	Divine, Julian De Grosso, Russell Ali, Sanjoy, Sid Sriram, Zach Cirino	Kohinoor
Gully Gang Cypher, Vol. 2 (with Aavrutti, D'Evil, MC Altaf & Shah Rule)	2020		Karan Kanchan		
Chaabi Wala Bandar (Quality Control) (Diss track aimed at Emiway Bantai)	2020		Stunnah Beatz		
Sach Bol Patta (Diss track aimed at Emiway Bantai)	2020		Stunnah Beatz		
Bas Kya Ba (with 7Bantaiz & D’Evil)	2020		DRJ Sohail		Shutdown EP by Mass Appeal, Gully Gang & Divine
Bag (featuring KR$NA)	2020		NDS, Stunnah Beatz & Progression Music		Shutdown EP by Mass Appeal, Gully Gang & Divine
Bandana Gang (featuring Sikander Kahlon)	2020		Xplicit & Stunnah Beatz		Shutdown EP by Mass Appeal, Gully Gang & Divine
Nahi Pata (with Frenzzy, Sammohit & Shah Rule)	2020		Xplicit		Shutdown EP by Mass Appeal, Gully Gang & Divine
3:59 AM	2020		Stunnah Beatz	Divine, Stunnah Beatz	Punya Paap
Mera Bhai	2020		Karan Kanchan	Divine, Karan Kanchan	Punya Paap
Walking Miracle (with Nas & Cocoa Sarai)	2020		iLL Wayno	Divine, Nas, Cocoa Sarai, iLL Wayno	Punya Paap
Satya	2020		Karan Kanchan	Divine, Gulzar, Karan Kanchan, Vishal	Punya Paap
Mirchi (ft. MC Altaf, Phenom & Stylo G)	2020	33	Phenom	Divine, MC Altaf, Phenom, Stylo G	Punya Paap
Disco Rap (with D’Evil & MC Altaf)	2020		Karan Kanchan & NDS	Divine, MC Altaf, D’Evil, Karan Kanchan, NDS	Punya Paap
Shehnai	2020		Stunnah Beatz & Byrd	Divine, Stunnah Beatz, Byrd	Punya Paap
Rider (with Lisa Mishra)	2020		Kanch & Stunnah Beatz	Divine, Lisa Mishra, Shah Rule, Kanch, Stunnah Beatz, Kyle Sremberger	Punya Paap
Top 5 D.O.A.	2020		Stunnah Beatz	Divine, Stunnah Beatz	Punya Paap
Drill Karte (with Dutchavelli)	2020		Stunnah Beatz	Divine, Dutchvelli, Stunnah Beatz	Punya Paap
Punya Paap	2020		iLL Wayno	Divine, iLL Wayno	Punya Paap
The Unforgiven (with Vishal Dadlani & Shor Police featuring Metallica) (Note: Samples "The Unforgiven" by Metallica)	2021		Shor Police & Devraj Sanyal		The Metallica Blacklist
Spicy (Freeverse) (Note: Uses the instrumental of the song "Spicy" by Nas)	2021		Hit-Boy		
Lion Heart (with KSHMR and Lit Killah featuring Jeremy Oceans and Karra)	2022		KSHMR		
Gunehgar	2022		Hit-Boy	Divine, Hit-Boy	Gunehgar
Baazigar (ft. Armani White)	2022	31	Karan Kanchan	Divine, Armani White, Karan Kanchan, Anu Malik, Nawab Arzoo	Gunehgar
Traffic Jam (ft. Jadakiss)	2022		iLL Wayno	Divine, Jadakiss, iLL Wayno	Gunehgar
Sitara (ft. Jonita Gandhi)	2022		Karan Kanchan	Divine, Jonita Gandhi, Karan Kanchan	Gunehgar
Bornfire (ft. Russ)	2022		Karan Kanchan, Ramoon, Roc Legion & iLL Wayno	Divine, Russ, Karan Kanchan, Anas Rahmoune, Joseph Watchorn, iLL Wayno	Gunehgar
Plush	2022		Harry Fraud	Divine, Harry Fraud	Gunehgar
Bhookh	2022		Stunnah Beatz & Hrithik Beats	Divine, Stunnah Beatz, Hrithik Beats	Gunehgar
Street Lori (ft. Wazir Patar)	2022		Stunnah Beatz & Hrithik Beats	Divine, Wahzir, Stunnah Beatz, Hrithik Beats	Gunehgar
Hitman	2022		Statik Selektah	Divine, Statik Selektah	Gunehgar
Akela	2022		Phenom	Divine, Phenom	Gunehgar
Flex Kar	2022		Hit-Boy	Divine, Hit-Boy	Gunehgar
Blessings (ft. Noizy)	2022		Phenom & Karan Kanchan	Divine, Noizy, Phenom, Karan Kanchan	Gunehgar
Chorni (ft. Sidhu Moose Wala)	2023		DRUGS BEATS & Mex Manny	Divine, Sidhu Moose Wala	
4.10 (ft. Lal Chand Yamla Jatt)	2023		ZZORAWAR & Arsh Heer	Divine	
Triple OG	2024		Phenom	Divine	Walking on Water
Wavy (Remix) (Note: Uses the instrumental of the song "Wavy" by Karan Aujla)	2025		Jay Trak	Divine	
Aag	2025		Abhijay Sharma	Divine	
Rain	2025		Stunnah Beatz	Divine	Walking on Water
You & I	2025		ZZORAWAR	Divine, R. D. Burman, Anand Bakshi	Walking on Water

==== As featured artist ====
Track	Year	Producer(s)	Album
ABE (Sikander Kahlon ft. Divine & B Meeks)	2014	Sikander Kahlon	MOHALI MESSIAH
Jungle Raja (Nucleya ft. Divine)	2015	Nucleya	Bass Rani
Ryder Music (Sikander Kahlon ft. Divine)	2015	Harm Sandhu	Last Resort
Mitra Da Swag (Sikander Kahlon ft. Deep Jandu, Gangis Khan & Divine)	2016	Harm Sandhu	werk16
Daru Daru (Deep Jandu ft. Divine & Gangis Khan)	2017	Deep Jandu	
City Slums (Raja Kumari ft. Divine)	2017	Beat Busta & Jules Wolfson	
Age 19 (Jass Manak ft. Divine)	2019	Deep Jandu	Age 19
Bombay To Punjab (Deep Jandu ft. Divine)	2019	Deep Jandu	Down To Earth
No Competition (Jass Manak ft. Divine)	2020	Jass Manak	No Competition
Bando Diaries (Remix) (Dutchavelli ft. ONEFOUR, Kekra, Noizy & Divine)	2020	Big Zeeko	
Level Up (Ikka ft. Divine & Kaater)	2020	DJ MissyK	I
Don't Forgive Me (Shah Rule ft. Divine)	2021	Stunnah Beatz	Hooked EP
Moosedrilla (Sidhu Moose Wala ft. Divine)	2021	The Kidd	Moosetape
Kaala Ghoda (Amrit Maan ft. Divine)	2021	Ikwinder Singh	All Bamb
Tu Te Kehndi C (Bohemia ft. Divine)	2022	Deep Jandu	I Am ICON
Busy Getting Paid (Ammy Virk ft. Divine)	2023	Starboy X	
O Sajna (Badshah ft. Divine)	2024	Hiten	Ek Tha Raja

=== Promotional tracks ===
Song	Year	Artist(s)	Producer(s)	Promoting
Shuffle	2017	Divine & SIRI	Sid Vashi	Bacardi Breezer Vivid
Suede Gully	2017	Divine, Prabh Deep, Khasi Bloodz & Madurai Souljour	Sneha Khanwalkar	Puma
Kaam 25	2018	Divine	Phenom	The Netflix series Sacred Games
NY Se Mumbai	2019	Nas ft. Divine, Naezy & Ranveer Singh	XD Pro & iLL Wayno	The film Gully Boy
Be a King	2019	Divine & SIRI		Budweiser Experiences
Sock Them	2019	Divine	Karan Kanchan	PUMA
Legends	2019	Divine	Karan Kanchan	Red Bull BC One
Salaam	2020	Divine	Karan Kanchan	Gully Gang and Budweiser One Team initiative to support the frontline warriors fighting COVID-19
Jungle Mantra	2021	Divine ft. Vince Staples & Pusha T	Karan Kanchan	The Netflix film The White Tiger
Kuch Karne Ka	2021	Divine	Karan Kanchan	HP
Bach Ke Rehna	2021	Divine, Badshah, Jonita Gandhi & Mikey McCleary	Mikey McCleary	The Netflix film Red Notice
Naya Sher	2023	Divine & Jonita Gandhi ft. Virat Kohli	Karan Kanchan	Royal Challenge

=== Film soundtracks ===
Film	Year	Song	Co-singer(s)	Music	Notes
Rum	2017	Pori Pathi Vizhum	Anirudh Ravichander, Diwakar	Anirudh Ravichander	Tamil film
Mukkabaaz	2018	Paintra	-	Nucleya	
Mukkabaaz	2018	Paintra (Extended Version)	-	Nucleya	
Blackmail	2018	Badla	Amit Trivedi	Amit Trivedi	
Sacred Games	2018	Kaam 25	-	Phenom and Yashraj Jaiswal (BGM music)	As a lyricist
Gully Boy	2019	Apna Time Aayega	Ranveer Singh, Dub Sharma	Dub Sharma	As a lyricist
Gully Boy	2019	Azadi	Dub Sharma	Dub Sharma	
Gully Boy	2019	Sher Aya Sher	Major C	Chandrashekar Kunder	
Gully Boy	2019	Mere Gully Mein	Ranveer Singh, Naezy, Sez on the Beat	Sez on the Beat	
Gully Boy	2019	Doori	Ranveer Singh, Rishi Rich	Rishi Rich	As a lyricist

== Awards and nominations ==
Year	Award	Category	Song	Result	Ref.
2014	2nd Radio City Freedom Awards	Best Hip-Hop Artist — Jury's Choice	Divine	Won	
2014	2nd Radio City Freedom Awards	Best Hip-Hop Artist — People's Choice	Divine	Won	
2015	GIMA Awards	Best EDM Track of the Year	Jungle Raja (Bass Rani) – Nucleya ft. Divine	Won	
2017	4th Radio City Freedom Awards	Best Hip-Hop Artist — Jury's Choice	Divine ft. Naezy	Won	
2020	65th Filmfare Awards	Best Lyrics	Apna Time Aayega (Gully Boy) – Divine & Ankur Tewari	Won	
2021	MTV Europe Music Awards	Best Indian Act		Won	

== Filmography ==
=== Documentaries ===
- Gully Life - The Story of Divine. 2019 documentary, Discovery Channel, 50 minutes.

== See also ==
- Gully Boy
- Gully rap
