= Ikka Singh =

Indian rapper, singer and lyricist

Ikka
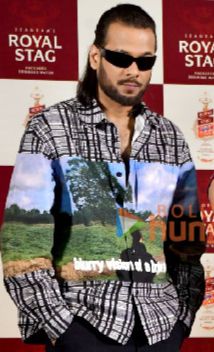
- Ikka in 2025

Background information
- Also known as: Ikka, Ikka Singh, Young Amli, Akki
- Born: Ankit Singh Patyal; 2 September 1988 (age 38); New Delhi
- Genres: Punjabi music, Hip Hop, Desi hip hop, Bollywood music, Rap, Underground music
- Occupations: Rapper; Lyricist; Music Composer
- Instruments: Vocals; piano; drums
- Years active: 2009–present
- Labels: T-Series, Mass Appeal Records, Kalamkaar, Universal Music India, Thug Sanghthan, VYRL Originals
- Formerly of: Mafia Mundeer
- Spouse: Nyra Patyal (m. 2022)

Ankit Singh Patyal (born 2 September 1988), better known by his stage names Ikka and Ikka Singh (formerly Young Amli), is an Indian rapper and lyricist.

== Career ==
=== 2006-2012: Career beginnings and Mafia Mundeer ===
Ikka was a childhood friend of fellow rappers, Raftaar and Lil Golu and their exploration of hip-hop together during their childhood towards their teenage years, led them to form a trio named Black Wall Street Desis, and eventually earned the three of them an opportunity to work with Yo Yo Honey Singh as a part of the Mafia Mundeer group.

=== 2014-2020: Career as a solo act and debut album ===
After splitting up from Mafia Mundeer, he started working as a solo artist and primarily a lyricist. He debuted in Bollywood with the song "In Da Club" for the 2014 film Tamanchey.

In 2016, Ikka, alongside Dr Zeus and Neetu Singh dropped the track "Half Window Down" which was a hit. Initially, the track was written for Diljit Dosanjh, however, due to delays and tight schedule, Zeus convinced Ikka to sing it himself to which he agreed. In 2018, Ikka released the song "Dope Ladka" and was featured on the song "Tere Te", by Guru Randhawa and Abhijit Vaghani, which was included on Randhawa's debut album, High Rated Gabru. Both tracks became commercial hits.

This, along with notable songs in Bollywood, like his most successful hit "Dilbar", the song "Badri Ki Dulhania", "Chamma Chamma", as well as the remix of "Oh Ho Ho Ho", eventually led him to release debut solo studio album, I, in 2020, under Mass Appeal India, featuring Divine, Sikander Kahlon and Lil Golu, among others. The album included the song, "Angaar" featuring Raftaar, which saw the duo collaborating after a decade. The music video for the song garnered 6 million views within 48 hours of its release.

=== 2021-present: Further successes ===
In 2022, he released his sophomore album, Nishu, which featured fellow Indian rappers, Seedhe Maut, Raga, Rawal, Aghor, and former fellow Mafia Mundeer members, Raftaar and Badshah. It was preceded by the release of the singles "Sab Jaanta Hai", "Nishu" and "Trap Munde" featuring Badshah. In the same year, he also appeared on The Kapil Sharma Show as a guest, alongside fellow rappers Raftaar, Badshah, Raja Kumari and King. He further collaborated with Badshah and Dino James on the single, "Woh", which went viral on YouTube, garnering 1.5 million views in a day. In 2023, he appeared on the first season of Red Bull 64 Bars, where he performed the track "Nostradamus", produced by Karan Kanchan.

In 2024, he moved towards his previous commercially-oriented sound with his third studio album, Only Love Gets Reply, which featured guest appearances from various Indian pop artists, like Karan Aujla, Sunidhi Chauhan, Guru Randhawa, Badshah and Diljit Dosanjh, while also featuring rappers MC Stan and Rawal. This release was followed by his collaborative EPs, Blood Is Better Than Tears, in 2024 and FUBU, in 2025 with hip-hop producer Sez on the Beat, who produced the latter half of his third album. Both of the EPs featured no guest appearances.

Ikka was also seen as a judge on the fourth season of the hip hop reality TV show, MTV Hustle, alongside Raftaar in 2024.

In 2026, he collaborated with Pakistani-American rapper Lazarus and American rapper Royce da 5'9" on the track "Dr. Jekyll and Mr. Hyde". He further released the EP, Enigma 2 Icon, produced by Sez on the Beat in the same year. The EP followed his two previous collaborations with Sez on the Beat.

He appeared on the second season of the show The Traitors India as a contestant on Amazon Prime Video in August 2026.

== Discography ==
=== Albums and EPs ===
Year	Album / EP	Track	Artist(s)	Produced by
2020	I	Level Up	Ikka ft. DIVINE & Kaater	DJ Missyk
2020	I	Demon	Ikka	Sez on the Beat
2020	I	Khatma	Ikka	Byg Byrd
2020	I	Conversation	Ikka	Sez on the Beat
2020	I	Gaanewale Rapper	Ikka ft. Lil Golu	Sez on the Beat
2020	I	Ps4 Pro	Ikka	AShock
2020	I	Aajkal	Ikka	Hardbazy
2020	I	Maujjan	Ikka ft. Sikander Kahlon	Phenom
2020	I	Angaar	Ikka ft. Raftaar	Sez on the Beat
2022	Nishu	Nishu	Ikka	IIouis & Ryan Nerby
2022	Nishu	Sab Jaanta Hai	Ikka	Bharg
2022	Nishu	Trap Munde	Ikka ft. Badshah	6yrslate
2022	Nishu	Fly	Ikka	Bharg
2022	Nishu	Spooky Song	Ikka ft. Dope D.O.D.	AShock
2022	Nishu	Dhoop Chhaon	Ikka ft. Rawal & Bharg	Bharg
2022	Nishu	Graffiti	Ikka	Hardbazy
2022	Nishu	Lyrical Rapper Dead	Ikka	Hardbazy & Travellback
2022	Nishu	Top Off	Ikka ft. Raftaar & Kaater	Byg Byrd
2022	Nishu	Sanki	Ikka ft. Seedhe Maut, Raga & Aghor	Sez on the Beat
2024	Only Love Gets Reply	O.L.G.R	Ikka, Sanjoy	Sanjoy
2024	Only Love Gets Reply	Urvashi	Ikka, MC Stan	Sanjoy
2024	Only Love Gets Reply	Laadla	Ikka	Sanjoy
2024	Only Love Gets Reply	House of Lies	Ikka, Karan Aujla	Sanjoy
2024	Only Love Gets Reply	Sharbat E Mohabbat	Ikka	Sanjoy
2024	Only Love Gets Reply	Who's That Girl	Ikka, Guru Randhawa	Sanjoy
2024	Only Love Gets Reply	Bhari Mehfil	Ikka, Sunidhi Chauhan	Sanjoy
2024	Only Love Gets Reply	Rest In Paradise	Ikka	Sez on the Beat
2024	Only Love Gets Reply	Cigarette	Ikka	Sez on the Beat
2024	Only Love Gets Reply	Jagga Jatt	Ikka, Diljit Dosanjh, Badshah	Sez on the Beat
2024	Only Love Gets Reply	Om	Ikka, Rawal	Sez on the Beat
2024	Blood Is Better Than Tears	Fucking Umeed	Ikka	Sez on the Beat
2024	Blood Is Better Than Tears	Gojira	Ikka	Sez on the Beat
2024	Blood Is Better Than Tears	Rainy Days	Ikka	Sez on the Beat
2024	Blood Is Better Than Tears	Bsdk / Patte Pe Patta	Ikka	Sez on the Beat
2025	FUBU	FUBU	Ikka	Sez on the Beat
2025	FUBU	Ambulance	Ikka	Sez on the Beat
2025	FUBU	Dogs & Snakes	Ikka	Sez on the Beat
2025	FUBU	Art Samajh Aata Nahi	Ikka	Sez on the Beat
2025	FUBU	Sunta Hoon Rawal	Ikka	Sez on the Beat
2026	Enigma 2 Icon	Hamla	Ikka	Sez on the Beat
2026	Enigma 2 Icon	Enigma 2 Icon	Ikka	Sez on the Beat
2026	Enigma 2 Icon	Shahrukh Khan	Ikka	Sez on the Beat
2026	Enigma 2 Icon	Fan/Stan	Ikka	Sez on the Beat
2026	Enigma 2 Icon	Drunk Ikka	Ikka	Sez on the Beat
2026	Enigma 2 Icon	Demon Slayer	Ikka	Sez on the Beat

=== Singles and collaborations ===
Year	Track	Artist(s)	Produced by	Note(s)
2009	Gadbad	Ikka (Young Amli), Raftaar, Lil Golu, Yo Yo Honey Singh	Honey Singh	Mafia Mundeer Records
2010	Nau Sau Bai (922)	Gaurav Dayal, Ikka		Beat Factory Music, from the compilation album Desi Hustle
2012	Miss Lonely	Diljit Dosanjh ft. Ikka	JSL	
2012	Sohniye	Ikka	Nickk	
2012	2 Puff	Ikka		
2012	Tequila Shot	Hardy Sandhu ft. Ikka	Mr. Vgrooves	From the album This Is Hardy Sandhu by Harrdy Sandhu
2013	Disco Wich Gidda	Deep Money ft. Ikka	Sachh	From the EP T-Urban by Deep Money
2014	Naam Mera	Ikka		Samples the song "Turn Down For What" by DJ Snake & Lil Jon
2014	Bad Girl	Sherlyn Chopra ft. Ikka		
2014	This Singh Is So Stylish	Diljit Dosanjh & Ikka	Intense	Presented by MTV Spoken Word
2014	Pasina	Jaz Dhami ft. Ikka & Sneakbo	Steel Banglez	
2014	Negative	Ikka	Nickk	
2015	Workout	JSL ft. Ikka	JSL	
2015	Sapne	Ikka		Presented by MTV Spoken Word
2015	Khat	Guru Randhawa ft. Ikka	Intense	
2015	Teddy Bear	Kanika Kapoor ft. Ikka	Vicky-Hardik & Aditya Dev	
2015	8th Wonder	Nickk ft. Ikka	Nickk	
2015	Sheesha Down	Avi J ft. Ikka	Sukh-E	
2016	Half Window Down	Ikka, Dr Zeus & Neetu Singh	Dr Zeus	
2016	Bholeynath	Millind Gaba, Ikka & Pallavi Gaba	Millind Gaba	
2016	Neendan	Rupali ft. Dr Zeus & Ikka	Dr Zeus	
2016	All I Need	Ikka	Rajat Nagpal	
2016	Hove Mere Naal	The PropheC ft. Ikka	The PropheC	From the album The Lifestyle by The PropheC
2017	Ladkiyan	Ikka & Nickk	Nickk	
2017	Playboy	Ronnie Singh ft. Ikka	Goldboy	
2017	Kurta Pajjama	R S Chauhan, Ikka & Preet Hundal	Preet Hundal	
2017	Shuruwat	Ikka	DJ Harpz	
2017	Party Nonstop	Dr Zeus ft. Jasmine Sandlas & Ikka	Dr Zeus	
2017	Last Seen	Ryan ft. Ikka	Enzo	
2017	Jaan Laggeya	Rishita ft. Ikka	Intense	
2017	Gaddi Kaali	JSL ft. Ikka	JSL	
2017	Lallantaap	Abhishek ft. Ikka	AShock	
2018	Mental	Rustum ft. Ikka	Teenu Arora	
2018	Good Morning	R S Chauhan ft. Ikka	JSL	
2018	Banggtown	Kuwar Virk ft. Ikka	Kuwar Virk	
2018	Pretty Girl	Kanika Kapoor & Ikka	Raaj Aashoo	
2018	Desi Bandri	Benny Dhaliwal & Ikka	Dr Zeus	
2018	Interview	Ikka	JSL	
2018	Dope Ladka	Ikka	Dr Zeus	
2018	Desi Anthem	Shevy, G Frekey, Ikka, Dr. Love & Lil Golu	Bigg Slim	
2018	Kalol	Ikka	Kartik Dev & Gaurav Dev	
2018	Tere Te	Guru Randhawa ft. Ikka	Vee	From the album High Rated Gabru by Guru Randhawa
2019	Parichay	Amit Bhadana & Ikka	Byg Byrd	
2019	Body Language	Ikka ft. THEMXXNLIGHT	The PropheC	
2019	Heartbeat	Akshay Shokeen ft. Ikka	Muzik Amy	
2019	YoYo	R S Chauhan ft. Ikka & Rishi RIch	Rishi Rich	
2019	This is Life	Ikka	Sound Heightz	
2019	Pala	Ezu ft. Manj Musik & Ikka	Ezu	From the album Arrival by Ezu
2020	Nindra	Ikka	The PropheC	
2020	Theek Hai Theek Hai	Ikka & Lil Golu	DJ Harpz	
2020	Hip To The Hop	Ikka	Hardbazy	
2020	Call Karenga	Roma Sagar ft. Ikka	Paul Sinha & Kevin Bakker	
2020	Awaaz Ye Azaad	Ikka	Sez on the Beat	
2020	Jassi	Payal Dev & Ikka	Raaj Aashoo	
2020	Ghost Rider	MC Altaf & Ikka	AAKASH	
2020	Thing You Want	Wengie & Shalmali ft. Ikka	Michel "Lindgren" Schulz	
2021	Bajre Da Sitta	Rashmeet Kaur & Deep Kalsi ft. Ikka	Deep Kalsi	
2021	Villain	Krsna ft. Karma & Ikka	Depo	From the album Still Here by Krsna
2021	Akkad Bakkad Bambey Bo	Rawal, Bharg, Sez on the Beat & Ikka	Sez on the Beat	From the album Sab Chahiye by Rawal & Bharg
2021	Booyah For Your City!	Ikka, Brodha V, Cizzy, StreetViolator & Kidshot		Promotional track for Garena Free Fire India
2021	Changa	Aghor & Ikka	AShock	
2021	Focus	Sukh-E ft. Ikka	Sukh-E	
2021	Fearless	Karma ft. Ikka	Deep Kalsi	From the album Made You Proud by Karma
2021	PEW PEW!	Rawal, Bharg & Ikka	Bharg	
2021	Sookha	Ikka ft. Sukh-E & Aghor	Dr Zeus	
2021	Cash Money	Sikander Kahlon ft. Ikka	Andy Grewal	From the EP Absolute Monarchy by Sikander Kahlon
2022	Maa Baap	MC Stan ft. Ikka	MC Stan	From the album Insaan by MC Stan
2022	Flex	Bali & Ikka	Enzo	
2022	Kartab	Ahmer & Ikka	Zero Chill & Lambo Drive	
2022	Unreachable	Karan Aujla ft. Ikka	Yeah Proof	From the EP Way Ahead by Karan Aujla
2022	Beymaniyaan	Ananya Birla & Ikka	Rahul Sathu	
2022	Each Other - 1 Min Music	Ikka	Hardbazy	
2022	Aakad	JSL, Ikka & Harshit Tomar	JSL	
2022	Das Ki Kasoor	Rahul Sathu & Ikka	Rahul Sathu	From the EP Shades of Blue by Rahul Sathu
2022	Woh	Ikka, Dino James & Badshah	AAKASH	
2022	Mor	Ikka, Rashmeet Kaur & Phenom	Phenom	
2023	Handcuff	Preet Harpal ft. Ikka	DJ Flow	
2023	Samaaj	Prabh Deep & Ikka	Prabh Deep	From the album Bhram (Deluxe) by Prabh Deep
2023	Chunari Mein Dag	Tony Kakkar, Yohani & Ikka	Tony Kakkar	
2023	Spaceship	Sammohit, Shah Rule & Ikka	Kanch & Shah Rule	
2023	Nostradamus	Ikka & Karan Kanchan	Karan Kanchan	Red Bull 64 Bars
2023	Rapman	Ikka & Sez on the Beat	Sez on the Beat	
2023	Paapi Girl	Ikka & Aleena	Shatak Sharma (STK)	
2023	Totka	Yungsta & Sez on the Beat ft. Ikka	Sez on the Beat	From the album Meen by Yungsta & Sez on the Beat
2023	Cuz of You	Ikka, Chuck	Sanjoy	
2023	Laadla	Ikka	Sanjoy	From the album Only Love Gets Reply by Ikka
2023	Urvashi	Ikka & MC Stan	Sanjoy	From the album Only Love Gets Reply by Ikka
2024	House Of Lies	Ikka and Karan Aujla	Sanjoy	From the album Only Love Gets Reply by Ikka
2024	Bhari Mehfil	Ikka and Sunidhi Chauhan	Sanjoy	From the album Only Love Gets Reply by Ikka
2024	OM	Ikka and Rawal	Sez on the Beat	From the album Only Love Gets Reply by Ikka
2024	Dil Kuch Hor Ni Mangda	Ikka and Tulsi Kumar	Sanjoy	
2025	Pray	Ikka, King	Hiten	
2025	ONLY ONE	Steel Banglez, Stefflon Don, Ikka	Steel Banglez, FRED	From the EP One Day It Will All Make Sense by Steel Banglez
2025	Eiffel Tower	Rawal, Ikka, Raga	Rawal	From the album Sherdil by Rawal
2025	Boom Boom Cha Cha (Ishq Ki Kamar)	Ikka, Faris Shafi	Ikka	
2025	Jahaaz	Ikka, SarpDansh	Navyug, Asmit	
2025	GHOST	Ikka, Young Aytee	Eyepatch	
2025	Maybe	Ikka, bebhumika, Armaan Malik	NEVERSOBER	Collaboration with Royal Stag Boombox
2025	CHANEL GOT WORK	Ab-17, Ikka	Hurricane	From the album Baawe Era by Ab-17
2025	Terrible Wishlists	Siyaahi, Ikka	Acharya	From the album Sultanate by Siyaahi
2026	Dr. Jekyll and Mr. Hyde	Lazarus, Ikka, Royce da 5'9"	Shawn Ski	
2026	Durghatna	Ikka, Raga, Karan Kanchan	Karan Kanchan	From the album Global Warning by Karan Kanchan

=== Soundtracks ===
Year	Film	Song	Singer(s)	Music	Lyricist(s)
2014	Tamanchey	In Da Club	Ikka	Intense	Ikka
2015	Kuch Kuch Locha Hai	Paani Wala Dance	Ikka, Shraddha Pandit & Arko Pravo Mukherjee	Arko Pravo Mukherjee & Intense	Ikka
2015	Kis Kisko Pyaar Karoon	Billi Kat Gayee	Rajveer Singh & Ikka	Dr. Zeus	Raj Ranjodh & Ikka
2016	Kyaa Kool Hain Hum 3	Jawani Le Doobi	Kanika Kapoor, Upendra Verma & Ikka	Sajid–Wajid	Danish Sabri & Ikka
2016	Sanam Re	Humne Pee Rakhi Hai	Jaz Dhami, Neha Kakkar & Ikka	Epic Bhangra	Kumaar & Ikka
2017	Badrinath Ki Dulhania	Badri Ki Dulhania	Dev Negi, Neha Kakkar, Monali Thakur & Ikka	Tanishk Bagchi	Shabbir Ahmed & Ikka
2017	Machine	Chatur Naar Remake	Nakash Aziz, Shashaa Tirupati & Ikka	Tanishk Bagchi	Niket Pandey & Ikka
2017	Hindi Medium	Oh Ho Ho Ho (Remix)	Sukhbir & Ikka	Sukhbir & Abhijit Vaghani	Suhkbir & Ikka
2017	Poster Boys	Kehndi Menoo	Yash Narvekar, Sukriti Kakar & Ikka	Rishi Rich	Kumaar & Ikka
2018	Nawabzaade	Mummy Kasam	Payal Dev, Gurinder Sehgal, & Ikka	Gurinder Sehgal	Kunaal Verma, Gurinder Sehgal & Ikka
2018	Nawabzaade	Amma Dekh	Gurinder Sehgal, Sukriti Kakar & Ikka	Gurinder Sehgal	Kumaar, Gurinder Sehgal & Ikka
2018	Genius	Pyar Le Pyar De	Dev Negi, Ikka & lulia Vantur	Himesh Reshammiya	Shabbir Ahmed & Ikka
2018	Mitron	Kamariya	Darshan Raval & Ikka	Lijo George & DJ Chetas	Kumaar & Ikka
2018	Bullets	Dirty Girl	Embee, Ikka & Shivangi Bhayana	Embee & Ikka	Ikka
2018	Baazaar	Kem Cho	Ikka & Jyotica Tangri	Tanishk Bagchi	Shabbir Ahmed & Ikka
2018	Satyamev Jayate	Dilbar	Neha Kakkar, Dhvani Bhanushali & Ikka	Tanishk Bagchi	Shabbir Ahmed & Ikka
2019	Fraud Saiyaan	Chamma Chamma	Neha Kakkar, Romi, Arun & Ikka	Tanishk Bagchi	Shabbir Ahmed & Ikka
2019	Amavas	Finito	Jubin Nautiyal, Sukriti Kakar & Ikka	Abhijit Vaghani	Kunaal Verma & Ikka
2019	Hume Tumse Pyaar Kitna	Manmohini	Mika Singh, Kanika Kapoor & Ikka	Raaj Aashoo, DJ Emenes (MIB) & Vicky-Hardik	Shabbir Ahmed & Ikka
2019	X-Ray: The Inner Image	Jigliya	Swati Sharma & Ikka	Raaj Aashoo	Shabbir Ahmed & Ikka
2020	Shubh Mangal Zyada Saavdhan	Arrey Pyar Kar Le	Bappi Lahiri, Ayushmann Khurrana & Ikka	Bappi Lahiri & Tanishk Bagchi	Anjaan & Vayu
2020	Coolie No. 1	Mummy Kasam	Udit Narayan, Ikka & Monali Thakur	Tanishk Bagchi	Ikka & Shabbir Ahmed
2022	Four More Shots Please!	Ding Dang	Dev Negi, Rashmeet Kaur, Ikka	Parth Parekh, Mikey McCleary	Ikka, IP Singh, Sandy Taneja
2023	Ganapath	Time 2 Shine	Priceless, Roach Killa, Dr Zeus, Ikka	Dr Zeus	Priceless, Roach Killa, Dr Zeus
