= Naezy =

Indian rapper (born 1993)

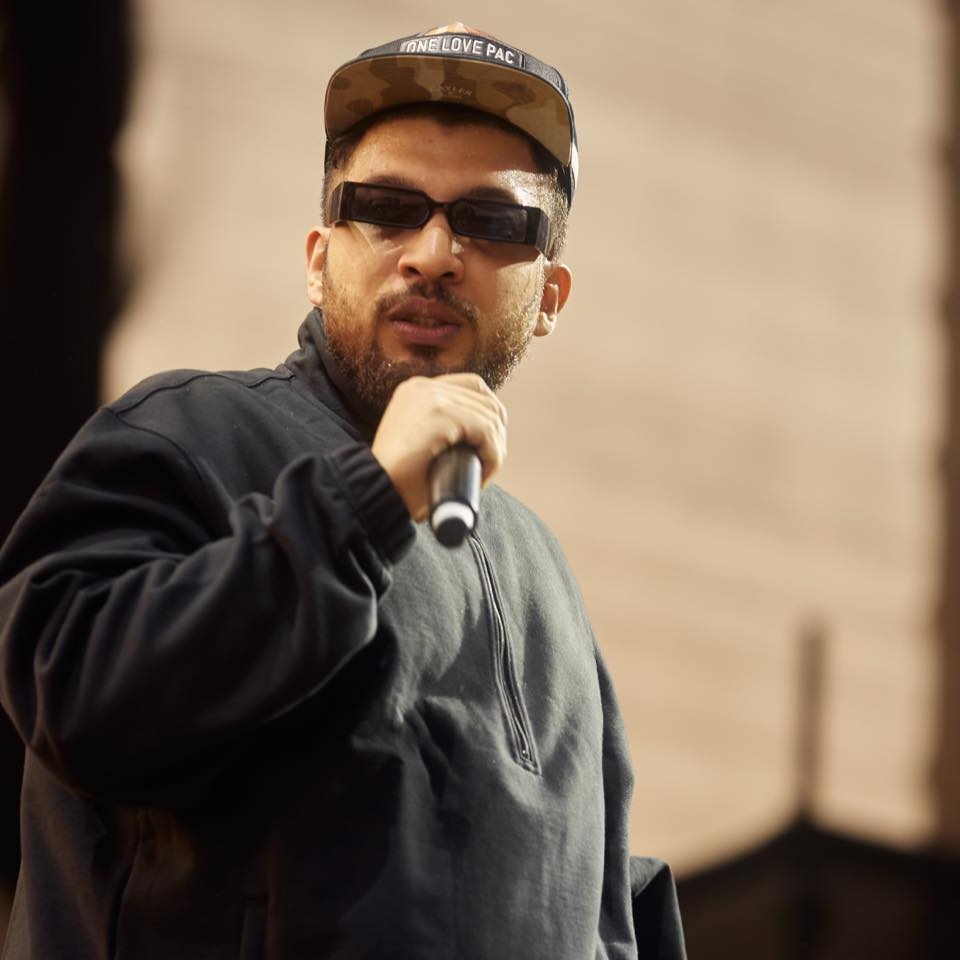
- Naezy at Vh1 Supersonic in 2024

Background information
- Also known as: Naezy
- Born: Naved Shaikh; 10 August 1993 (age 33); Kurla, Mumbai, Maharashtra, India
- Genres: Gully rap; hip hop; conscious rap; political hip hop; hardcore hip hop
- Occupations: Rapper; songwriter; music composer
- Years active: 2014-present
- Labels: T-Series; Sony Music India; Azadi Records; Big Bang Records

Naved Shaikh (born 1993), professionally known as Naezy, is an Indian rapper and songwriter from Mumbai, Maharashtra. He first broke into mainstream rap with the song "Mere Gully Mein" (from the movie Gully Boy), featuring fellow rapper DIVINE. A fictional version of his character has been portrayed by Ranveer Singh in the Zoya Akhtar-directed 2019 musical film Gully Boy. He made his film debut with the hit song "Birju" from the 2015 film Hey Bro, the music video for which featured celebrated Bollywood actors Amitabh Bachchan, Akshay Kumar, Hrithik Roshan, Ajay Devgn, as well as choreographer Prabhu Deva, with the film's lead actor Ganesh Acharya.

In 2024, Naezy was a contestant on the reality TV show Big Boss OTT Season 3, finishing as the runner-up.

== Early life ==
Naved Shaikh was born in 1993 in Kurla, Mumbai, India. His father is Shahid Raza and mother Farhin Raza. His family originates from Amravati, where he still has relatives. He was raised by his mom as his father works in Dubai. He grew up in a tenement for the impoverished working class called Ram Bachan Chawl, located in the neighbourhood of Kurla, Mumbai.

He was raised as a troubled child mostly by his mother as his father was employed overseas. After a run-in with the law as a juvenile he directed his energies in creative expression of his and others' life struggles.

He completed his T.Y. B.Sc from Guru Nanak Khalsa College, Matunga, where he met his rapper friend Neykhil Naik aka NCube and formed a collective called The Schizophrenics.

== Career ==
Naezy debuted with a DIY music video "Aafat!" which he made using an iPad in 2014. Naezy's debut single, "Aafat!', credited as the genesis track of the gully rap scene, was released in 2014, followed by his collaboration with Divine on their breakout 2015 hit, "Mere Gully Mein". The song brought attention to the Mumbai rap scene and eventually lead to the breakthrough for both DIVINE and Naezy. He also released "Tragedy Mein Comedy", a satirical song which was used as the intro track in the show On Air With AIB, which was created by the comedy group All India Bakchod.

Following the song's release, a documentary titled Bombay 70 (the 70 stands for the area code of Kurla West) about his life was produced. Bombay 70 was directed by independent filmmaker Disha Rindani. The documentary was awarded as the best short film at MAMI in 2014. Naezy featured on the track "Birju" from the film Hey Bro in 2015.

Their music caught the attention of director Zoya Akhtar and inspired her to make a film about the Mumbai rap scene called Gully Boy starring Ranveer Singh and Alia Bhatt. The film is loosely based on the lives of Divine and Naezy who were consulted for the rap aspects of the film. "Mere Gully Mein" was remade for the film. In this version, Singh's character takes over Naezy's part. Singh re-recorded Naezy's verse for the film. He became the first rapper to be a featured artist on the Indian music streaming platform JioSaavn. He was also featured on the song "NY se Mumbai" with DIVINE, Singh and American rapper Nas, who also served as an executive producer for the film. The song was released as a promotional single shortly prior to the release of the film. Naezy has retrospectively added that the film negatively impacted his fame and that "its story was very far from reality and has annoyed him".

Naezy's music often addresses socio-political issues and he has spoken about wanting to create conscious hip-hop music to bring awareness among young people. His songs "Haq Hai", "Tragedy Mein Comedy", "Azaad Hu Mein" are some of the songs that deal with politics and issues that the common man faces.

He has faced issues convincing his family about his rap career, which was one reason he left the underground rap scene in 2018. Another reason he took this hiatus was to get away from the pressures of becoming more famous. The hiatus, however, made him realise his passion for rap music. He returned to the scene in 2019 with his new single "Aafat Wapas" which is a sequel of his first track "Aafat". The video was shot by Happy Mandal with whom he had worked with before and was shot using an iPhone XS Max. The following year, he released his debut album, comprising six songs, titled Maghreb.

In 2024, Naezy appeared in an interview, where he was asked about his possible upcoming collaborations with other desi hip-hop artists. Upon being asked whether Talha Anjum was one of the artists he was going to collaborate with, he denied knowing the rapper. This sparked a well-publicized beef between the two artists, with the latter releasing a diss track against Naezy, titled, "Kaun Talha", on June 9, 2024, a reference to Naezy's response to the question he was asked in the interview. This prompted Naezy to respond on his track "Kya Bey Shaane", the next day, as well as "Napaak", which was released six days later.

After this, Naezy appeared in the third season of Bigg Boss OTT, finishing as the first runner-up in the show. Naezy continued to release songs, like "Farishtey" and "Taafu", the lead singles from his EP Fateh, followed by the release of his EPs HATELI, Jaan and Alter. He also appeared on the track "Aflatoon" off fellow Mumbai rapper Emiway Bantai's sixth studio album FTSTTS.

== Discography ==
=== Studio albums and EPs ===
Title	Details
Maghreb	Released: January 8, 2020; Label: Big Bang Records; Format: digital download, streaming
2014	Released: June 30, 2020; Label: Big Bang Records; Format: digital download, streaming
Tarqeeb	Released: May 3, 2022; Label: Independent; Format: digital download, streaming
22	Released: November 22, 2022; Label: Independent; Format: digital download, streaming
Apocalypse	Released: April 22, 2023; Label: Independent; Format: digital download, streaming
Anti Fitna	Released: April 20, 2024; Label: Independent; Format: digital download, streaming
Fateh	Released: March 31, 2025; Label: T-Series; Format: digital download, streaming
Hateli	Released: July 18, 2025; Label: Independent; Format: digital download, streaming
Jaan	Released: August 20, 2025; Label: Independent; Format: digital download, streaming
Alter	Released: November 27, 2025; Label: Independent; Format: digital download, streaming

=== Singles ===
Year	Track	Produced by
2014	Aafat!	
2014	Raaste Kathin	Naezy
2014	Sabse Hatkar	Mode7
2014	Aur Aafat (Ncube ft. Naezy)	
2014	Bhalta The Psypher 1.0 (with Ncube)	
2014	Kyu (Ncube ft. Naezy & Bob Churi)	
2014	The Psypher 1.5 (with Ncube & Saheb)	
2015	Sabke Liye Broadband (with Ncube)	
2015	Mere Gully Mein (DIVINE ft. Naezy)	Sez on the Beat
2016	Haq Hai	Sez on the Beat
2016	Tragedy Mein Comedy	Sez on the Beat
2016	Asal Hustle	Sez on the Beat
2016	Tehelka	Sez on the Beat
2017	Azaad Hu Mai	Naezy
2017	Aane De	Karan Kanchan
2017	Yaad Rakh (with Benny Dayal)	Dub Sharma
2019	Voice of the Streets, Ep. 1 (Gully Boy Promo)	Siddhant Shirodkar
2019	NY se Mumbai (with Nas, DIVINE & Ranveer Singh)	XD Pro, iLL Wayno
2019	Bombay 70 (Recorded in 2014)	Natiq
2019	Aafat Waapas	Phenom
2019	Mama Mia (with Sez on the Beat)	Sez on the Beat
2019	Dhoond Le	Karan Kanchan
2019	Ab Teri Baari (with Ayushmann Khurrana)	Clinton Cerejo
2019	Rukta Nah	Karan Kanchan
2019	Vahem	Byg Byrd
2019	Fatke	Major C
2019	Let's Crack It! - Unacademy Student Anthem	Dub Sharma
2021	Sholay (with MC Mawali & Karan Kanchan)	Karan Kanchan
2021	Kasa Kai (with Rākhis)	Rākhis
2022	Haalaat	Bharg
2022	Trip Bhaari - 1 Min Music	Major C
2022	Kya Bataye	Naezy
2023	Mallika	Asal Minaaj
2023	Sup!	Vernon Tauro
2024	No Ghaflat	Vernon Tauro
2024	Fearless	Purpledragon
2024	Islah	Vernon Tauro
2024	Kya Bey Shaane?	RaySon4 7
2024	Naapaak	Vernon Tauro
2024	Akshar	Vernon Tauro
2024	Roshni	Vernon Tauro
2025	Taafu (From the EP Fateh)	Vernon Tauro
2025	Farishtey (From the EP Fateh)	Tha Armani
2025	Bhamai (From the EP Fateh)	Tha Armani
2025	Ceasefire	Naezy
2025	Mai Aafat	Sez on the Beat
2025	Rawas	Naezy
2025	QUWAT	Naezy
2025	EDI KHOPDI	Naezy
2025	WICKET	Naezy
2025	DANGER	Naezy
2025	Ek Tum Ho	Naezy
2025	Aflatoon (Emiway Bantai ft. Naezy)	MEMAX
2025	Area Me Dhoor	Uzi Music
2026	Rooh	CJ Chirag
2026	Mashaal	Ae Zed En
2026	Taapmaan	Ae Zed En
2026	Bambai	Ae Zed En

=== Film music ===
Year	Film	Song	Music	Co-singer(s)	Notes
2015	Hey Bro	Birju	Nitz 'N' Sony	Mika Singh, Udit Narayan, Arya	
2017	Bank Chor	BC Rap Knockout: Mumbai vs Delhi	Shameer Tandon	Pardhaan	
2018	Bhavesh Joshi Superhero	Hum Hain Insaaf	Amit Trivedi	Babu Haabi	As a lyricist
2019	Gully Boy	Mere Gully Mein	Sez on the Beat	Ranveer Singh, DIVINE, Sez on the Beat	As a lyricist
