= Krsna (rapper) =

Indian rapper

KR$NA
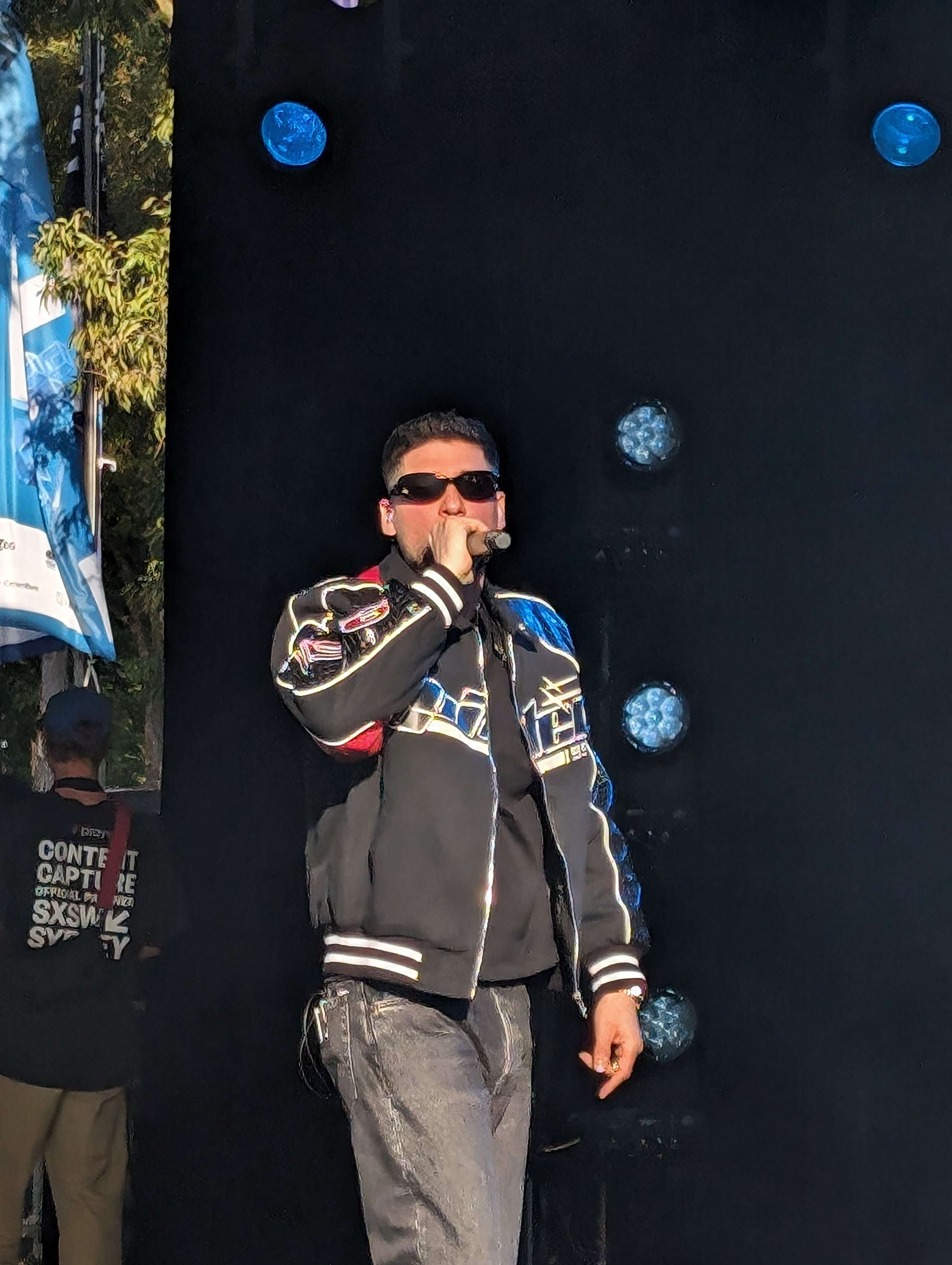
- Krishna at SXSW Sydney, October 2024.

Background information
- Also known as: Krsna, YoungProzpekt, Prozpekt, Underthug, MC Phyxer, Dolla Sign
- Born: Krishna Kaul; Delhi, India
- Genres: Hip-hop; Indian hip-hop
- Occupations: Rapper; Songwriter; Producer
- Instrument: Vocals
- Years active: 2006–present
- Labels: Universal Music India; Kalamkaar; Zee Music Company
- Website: https://realkrsna.com

Krishna Kaul, known mononymously as Krishna, stylised now as KR$NA, (previously known as Krsna, and formerly as YoungProzpekt) is an Indian rapper. He was one of the earliest rappers to emerge in the Indian hip hop scene in the mid-2000s under the stage name Prozpekt. He is widely acknowledged within the desi hip-hop community for pioneering a lyrical revolution in the genre, infusing a new wave of poetic depth and lyrical complexity into hip-hop's narrative. He was also briefly featured in the 2019 Bollywood film Gully Boy as himself.

== Early life and influences ==
Kaul was born into a Kashmiri Pandit family in Delhi. He spent a part of his childhood in South London, where he was raised and schooled for a few years. Kaul started rapping at the age of fourteen in an effort to blend in with other children at his school in London. He did his graduation from Hansraj College, where he formed a crew with his friends, titled Illicit Cash Mob. In 2008, Kaul moved to Mumbai to study public relations at the Xavier Institute of Communications.

He credits his uncle in Kashmir, for introducing him to hip-hop music, who played him the songs of MC Hammer and Public Enemy. When he started in the battle rap scene in India, he drew inspirations from the works of Lloyd Banks, Jadakiss, Fabolous, and Big L.

== Career ==
=== 2006-2011: Career beginnings and "Kaisa Mera Desh" ===
After releasing a few collaborations with rappers like Rabbit Sack C and Big T under the stage name Young Prozpekt, Kaul's first shot of success came with the release of the music video for "Kaisa Mera Desh" in 2010, becoming the first Indian hip-hop song on YouTube and earning a number 2 ranking as one of the most watched music videos in India overnight, following its release. His next success came with the song "Lokpal Freestyle", which shared the same theme of conscious hip-hop. He also released a song titled "Vijay" in collaboration with international NGO, Save The Children in 2013.

After sporadic underground releases including collaborations with artists such as Twisted Insane and Lost Stories, Kaul switched from Prozpekt to the stage name KR$NA after signing with Contrabands, a joint venture company between Universal Music India, VH1 and Hard Rock Cafe, in 2013. In May 2014, he released his debut studio album Sellout, an all-English effort on Universal Music with its lead single "Last Night" peaking at number 5 on the VH1 Music Charts in India. Kaul became the first hip-hop artist in India to do a five-city album tour with a band. Following this, the music video for the title song "Sellout" was released, but the project failed to make a large impact due to lacklustre marketing and shrinking label budgets.

=== 2016-2021: Comeback and further successes ===
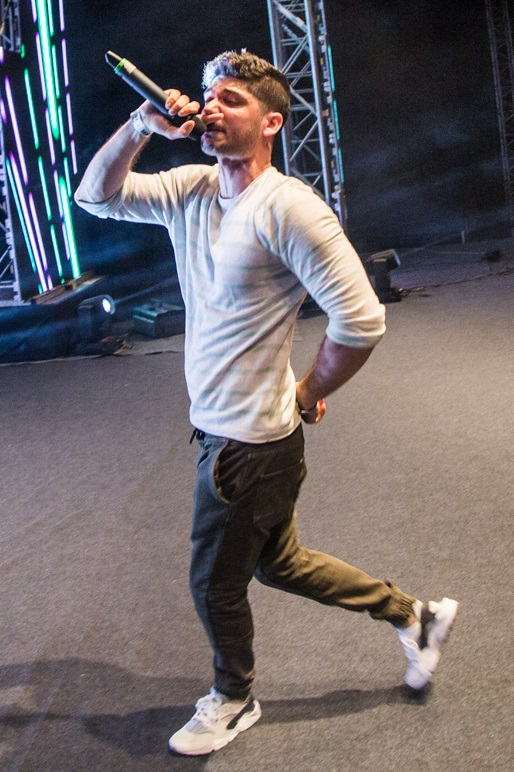
KR$NA during a live performance, 2016

After a two-year hiatus, Kaul made his return in 2016 with his Hindi release "Vyanjan". Following the success of the song, he signed to the artist management agency DNH Artists (now Kalamkaar) in 2017 and became a partner in 2018, with the likes of Ankit Khanna and Raftaar.

In 2019, Kaul released "Freeverse Feast (Langar)", produced by Raftaar, allegedly in response to rapper Emiway Bantai's "Freeverse Feast (Daawat)", where the latter boastfully claimed that "he's the only rapper representing India worldwide". This was the first track which sparked a feud between the two rappers, even though both had collaborated back in 2017.

In 2020, Kaul accused the IPL and Disney+ Hotstar of permitting the plagiarism of his 2017 song "Dekh Kaun Aaya Wapas" when creating the 2020 IPL anthem "Ayenge Hum Wapas", an allegation which was dismissed by composer Pranav Ajayrao Malpe. Kaul responded by stating that "his team[...], will take the legal route and approach Disney+ Hotstar, which commissioned the song". In the same year, he released the diss track, "Makasam", against rapper Muhfaad, which is widely regarded as one of the best diss tracks in Indian hip-hop.

In the month of January 2021, Kaul was featured on American rapper Hi-Rez's song "Crossroads" along with Royce da 5'9". Later in July, another collaboration with Hi-Rez was released, titled "Playground" which also featured former Slaughterhouse member, KXNG Crooked. His collaboration in Hi-Rez's song "Overdrive", was released in November 2021, featuring A-F-R-O, Joell Ortiz, Bizzy Bone, Tech N9ne and Twista. The music videos were released on Hi-Rez's YouTube channel. In the same year, Kaul also released his sophomore studio album Still Here, his first full-length project to be released through Kalamkaar Records, the artist agency he had joined 3 years back. The album featured guest appearances from labelmates Raftaar, Rashmeet Kaur, and Karma, apart from fellow rappers Ikka, and Badshah.

=== 2022-present: Collaborations, mainstream success and Yours Truly ===
In 2022, he featured on Karan Aujla's song "Ykwim", and also made an appearance in the music video. In the same year, also collaborated with British rapper French the Kid, on the song "10 Pe 10", which was released in November 2022, with an accompanying music video.

After the release of some tracks containing subliminal disses on each other, the beef between KR$NA and Emiway Bantai escalated in 2022, when Emiway released "Chusamba", in response to which KR$NA released "Lil Bunty". Emiway again responded with "KR L$DA SIGN", and KR$NA released "Machayenge 4", referring to Emiway's popular song series. Emiway retorted with his own version of "MACHAYENGE 4", and was met with widespread backlash, which prompted him to delete the track for a while after its original release.

Kaul with Brodha V won the Radio City Freedom Awards 2023 on 31 March 2023, for the Best Indie Collaboration. The two won the award for the song "Forever", which was released in September 2022. Starting in 2023, Kaul released a series of EPs, which featured collaborations from fellow rappers, and producers in the desi hip-hop scene. His first EP, Time Will Tell, released in March 2023 and featured Pakistani rappers Talha Anjum, and Talhah Yunus, and production from their frequent collaborators, Umair and Jokhay. His second EP, FAR FROM OVER, released in August 2023, and featured the Indian hip-hop duo Seedhe Maut, musician AR Paisley and production from Bharg. His third EP, For The Day One$, which released in 2024, also featured production from Bharg, and guest appearances from rappers Faris Shafi, Karma, and singer Lisa Mishra.

In 2025, Kaul, along with 3 other rappers– Jay Park, MaSiWei, and Vannda, featured on Japanese hip-hop artist Awich's track "Asian State of Mind", which was released on 28 February, accompanied by a music video, which was shot in each of the featured rappers' home countries. In the same year, Kaul announced his first mixtape, Yours Truly, which was also his first project to be distributed via Mass Appeal India. The announcement coincided with American rapper Nas making his India debut on 19 April 2025 at Mass Appeal Presents: The World Reunion—A Charity Concert in Mumbai, where Kaul also performed. Yours Truly eventually released on 22 May 2025, with a title announcement, made 4 days prior to its release. It featured guest appearances from Seedhe Maut, Raftaar, Aitch, Awich, Yashraj and Badshah. The mixtape used an episode of the 2015 podcast series, Voice of the People, as interludes. The project peaked at #1 on Apple Music within 12 hours of release and crossed over a million streams on Spotify within 24 hours. The music videos of the tracks, "Who You Are", "Vibrate" and "Sensitive" were released shortly after the album's release, with the music video for "Sensitive" featuring comedian Samay Raina. Kaul also featured on the cover of Rolling Stone India in October 2025.

In the same year, Kaul entered into a collaboration with boAt Lifestyle and was appointed as the brand ambassador, serving as the public face of the company.

In 2026, he released the track "Dilli Re", which served as the official anthem for the IPL team Delhi Capitals, for the 2026 Indian Premier League season, and featured on the song "Too Bait", from the soundtrack of the web-series Bait, alongside AJ Tracey, Anik Khan, and Enny. He also released a collaboration with Haryana rapper Dhanda Nyoliwala, titled "Boom Shaka", accompanied by a music video, in April 2026. The track became a commercial hit, amassing over 74 million views on YouTube. Alongside Raftaar, he announced a reality show focusing on hip-hop, titled Legacy, produced by SVF Entertainment, which started airing on YouTube and further partnered with ZEE5 as well for streaming rights. In July 2026, he joined the 2026 Delhi Jantar Mantar protests, to show his solidarity with the protestors and their cause.

== Discography ==
=== Albums ===
- 2014: Sellout
- 2021: Still Here

Year	Album	Tracks	Artist(s)	Producer(s)
2014	Sellout	The Glorious First Step	KR$NA	Bradley Dhawan
2014	Sellout	Faded	KR$NA, Cory Jones	Tony Fadd
2014	Sellout	Sellout	KR$NA	Tony Fadd
2014	Sellout	Getting Away	KR$NA	Breathtaking Beats
2014	Sellout	Last Night	KR$NA	Metrognome
2014	Sellout	Erryday	KR$NA, Sonny Brown	Tony Fadd
2014	Sellout	Tripping	KR$NA	Tony Fadd
2014	Sellout	Last Song	KR$NA	Bradley Dhawan
2021	Still Here	Still Here (Intro)	KR$NA	SAFIN
2021	Still Here	What's My Name	KR$NA	Raftaar
2021	Still Here	Roll Up	KR$NA, Badshah	Josh Petruccio
2021	Still Here	Villain	KR$NA, Karma, Ikka	Depo
2021	Still Here	Dream	KR$NA	Deep Kalsi
2021	Still Here	Fall Off (Interlude)	KR$NA	Kapellmaister
2021	Still Here	Saza-E-Maut	KR$NA, Raftaar	Rill Beats, Young Grape Beatz
2021	Still Here	Na Hai Time	KR$NA	J Caspersen
2021	Still Here	Living Legend	KR$NA, Rashmeet Kaur	Didker

=== EPs ===
- 2023: Time Will Tell
- 2023: Far from Over
- 2024: For the Day Ones

Year	EP	Tracks	Artist(s)	Producer(s)
2023	Time Will Tell	Kaha Tak	KR$NA	Jokhay, Umair
2023	Time Will Tell	NGL	KR$NA, Talhah Yunus	Umair, Rovalio
2023	Time Will Tell	Been A While	KR$NA, Talha Anjum	Umair
2023	FAR FROM OVER	Still Standing	KR$NA	Enigma Beats
2023	FAR FROM OVER	Prarthana	KR$NA	Bharg, Deep Kalsi, Umair
2023	FAR FROM OVER	Wanna Know	KR$NA	Sylvester
2023	FAR FROM OVER	Hola Amigo	KR$NA, Seedhe Maut	Umair
2023	FAR FROM OVER	Some Of Us	KR$NA, AR Paisley	JPBEATZ
2024	For The Day One$	Shut Up	KR$NA	Subspace
2024	For The Day One$	What's Up	KR$NA, Lisa Mishra	Riz Shain
2024	For The Day One$	Stay Away	KR$NA, Bharg	Bharg
2024	For The Day One$	Role Model	KR$NA, Faris Shafi, Karma	Deep Kalsi
2026	Don't Try This At Home	BUZZ	KR$NA, Seedhe Maut	Calm
2026	Don't Try This At Home	Mujhe Nahi Chahiye	KR$NA, Seedhe Maut	Hurricane
2026	Don't Try This At Home	Late/Latte (skit)	KR$NA, Seedhe Maut	Calm
2026	Don't Try This At Home	Please	KR$NA, Seedhe Maut	Calm
2026	Don't Try This At Home	Wait For A While	KR$NA, Seedhe Maut	RiJ
2026	Don't Try This At Home	Fillet Mignion	KR$NA, Seedhe Maut, Raftaar	Calm

=== Mixtapes ===
- 2025: Yours Truly

Year	Mixtape	Tracks	Artist(s)	Producer(s)
2025	Yours Truly	VOTP SKIT 1	Enkore, Bobkat	Phenom
2025	Yours Truly	Nothing to Prove	KR$NA	Phenom
2025	Yours Truly	Knock Knock	KR$NA	Phenom
2025	Yours Truly	Sensitive	KR$NA, Seedhe Maut	Hurricane
2025	Yours Truly	VOTP SKIT 2	Enkore, Bobkat	Phenom
2025	Yours Truly	Never Enough	KR$NA	Phenom
2025	Yours Truly	Buss Down	KR$NA, Raftaar	Sana, M61
2025	Yours Truly	KKBN	KR$NA	Lambo Drive
2025	Yours Truly	VOTP SKIT 3	Enkore, Bobkat	Phenom
2025	Yours Truly	Talk My Shit/Guarantee	KR$NA, Yashraj	NEVERSOBER
2025	Yours Truly	Hello	KR$NA, Awich	Karan Kanchan
2025	Yours Truly	Vibrate	KR$NA, Badshah	Phenom
2025	Yours Truly	Who You Are	KR$NA, Aitch	lejJA, Phenom
2025	Yours Truly	Yours Truly	KR$NA	Bharg
2025	Yours Truly	VOTP SKIT 4	Enkore, Bobkat	Phenom

=== Soundtracks ===
Year	Album	Track(s)	Artist(s)	Producer(s)
2015	Yahaan Sabki Lagi Hai	"Patli Gali"	Pankaj Awasthi, KR$NA	Pankaj Awasthi
2026	Bait	"Too Bait"	KR$NA, AJ Tracey, Anik Khan, and Enny	Dirty Danger

=== Singles and collaborations ===
Year	Track	Artist(s)	Producer(s)	Note(s)
2006	I Want it All	Young Prozpekt	David Richards, Queen	Samples Queen's "I Want It All"
2006	Bitch Please (Remix)	Big T ft.Young Prozpekt	Dr. Dre	Remix of Eminem's "Bitch Please II"
2007	I Go Go	Young Prozpekt ft. Soldier Hard		
2008	F$ck Wit Us	Pacifik ft. Young Prozpekt		From the album F1J1 Survivor by Pacifik
2009	Fancy Gill	Rabbit Sack C & Young Prozpekt	Rabbit Sack C	From the album BackLog by Rabbit Sack C
2009	Thats me / Shahzaade	Rabbit Sack C, Bluntz, Young Prozpekt & NYCE	Rabbit Sack C	From the album BackLog by Rabbit Sack C
2009	Yellow Taxi	Rabbit Sack C, Young Prozpekt, Big T & Slim Neil	Rabbit Sack C	From the album BackLog by Rabbit Sack C
2009	Naam Toh Pukar / Get Out Of My Way	Prozpekt		
2010	Kaisa Mera Desh	Prozpekt	DJ Corbett	
2010	Khatarnaak	Prozpekt ft. Sonny Brown		From the compilation album Desi Hustle
2011	Imran Khan – Amped Up (Amplifier Remix)	Rabbit Sack C & Young Prozpekt	Rabbit Sack C	
2011	DISCONNECT	Su.1, Prozpekt & Ashish D'souza	Su.1	
2011	Poocho na Yaar Kya Hua – Remix	Rabbit Sack C & Young Prozpekt		
2011	Lokpal Freestyle	Prozpekt		
2012	Peeche Na Dekh	Rabbit Sack C ft. Prozpekt	Rabbit Sack C	
2012	Put Ur Lighters Up	Rabbit Sack C ft. Su.1 & Prozpekt	Rabbit Sack C	
2012	Vijay	Prozpekt	DJ Corbett	From the album BackLog by Rabbit Sack C
2013	Whatchya Know About It	Rabbit Sack C & Young Prozpekt	Rabbit Sack C	
2013	Cold Blooded	Prozpekt ft. Twisted Insane	MetroGnome	
2013	How You Like Me Now	Lost Stories ft. Krishna Kaul	Lost Stories	From the album Music for the # Generation by Lost Stories
2014	Bang Bang	Rabbit Sack C, Young Prozpekt, Agrim Joshi & Nishit Bhatia	Rabbit Sack C	From the album BackLog by Rabbit Sack C
2015	Keep It Real	KR$NA		
2015	NO HASHTAG	KR$NA & Su Real	Su Real	Released via SoundCloud
2015	I'm Back	KR$NA & FuzzCulture	FuzzCulture	Released via SoundCloud
2015	Beyond The Matrix	Rabbit Sack C ft. KR$NA	Rabbit Sack C	
2015	Shots Fired	MojoJojo & Sound Avtar ft. KR$NA	MojoJojo	From the album Shots Fired by MojoJojo
2015	Jungle Raj	MojoJojo ft. KR$NA	MojoJojo	From the album Shots Fired by MojoJojo
2016	Vyanjan	KR$NA	Insane	
2016	Desi Wrap Up 2016	KR$NA	Insane	
2017	Meri Baari	Kidshot ft. KR$NA	Rekoil Chafe	
2017	Tere Buss Ki Na Hai	KR$NA	KR$NA	
2017	Dekh Kaun Aaya Wapas	KR$NA	Breathtaking & LAD	
2017	Woofer	Deep Kalsi & KR$NA	Deep Kalsi	
2017	Mumbai Se Delhi Tak	Emiway Bantai & KR$NA	Insane	
2017	I’m Ready	KR$NA ft. Raftaar	Breathtaking & LAD	
2017	Alag	KR$NA	J.P	
2018	Hip Hop Holi (MTV)	KR$NA, Deep Kalsi & Harjas	Deep Kalsi	Released via Facebook
2018	Aakhir Tumhe Aana Hai	Suryaveer ft. KR$NA	Boney John	
2018	Delhi Times	KR$NA	Dhruv Ganekar	From "Flirt with Your City Rap" by Times Network
2018	Muqabla	KR$NA	KR$NA	
2019	Voice of the Streets Ep.04 – KR$NA	KR$NA	Siddhant Shirodkar	Voice of the Streets is a capsule series from the 2019 Bollywood film Gully Boy
2019	Solo	KR$NA	Certi	
2019	Warm Up	Deep Kalsi, Karma, Harjas, Kidshot, KR$NA & Raftaar	Deep Kalsi	Kidshot was later replaced by Raftaar in a live version
2019	Janta Kyun	KR$NA	Deep Kalsi	
2019	No No	Deep Kalsi, Harjas & KR$NA	Deep Kalsi	
2019	Farak Nahi Padta	KR$NA	JCaspersen	
2019	Aadat	KR$NA	JCaspersen	
2019	Freeverse Feast (Langar)	KR$NA	Raftaar	A response to Emiway Bantai's "Freeverse Feast (Daawat)"
2019	Seedha Makeover	KR$NA	Call Me G	Diss track aimed Emiway Bantai, after his track "Seedha Takeover"
2019	Dum Hai	KR$NA	Dannyetracks	
2020	Untitled	KR$NA	Dansonn	
2020	Maharani	KR$NA	Dansonn	Diss track aimed at Delhi-based rapper, Muhfaad
2020	Sher	Deep Kalsi ft. KR$NA, Harjas & Karma	Xplicit	
2020	Makasam	KR$NA	Deep Kalsi & KR$NA	Second diss track aimed at Muhfaad
2020	Quarantine	Young Stunners & KR$NA	Jokhay	
2020	Damn	Raftaar ft. KR$NA	Raftaar	From the album Mr. Nair by Raftaar
2020	Down	Raftaar ft. KR$NA	Raftaar	From the album Mr. Nair by Raftaar
2020	Tokyo Drift Freestyle	KR$NA	The Neptunes	Uses the instrumental from "Tokyo Drift" by Teriyaki Boyz Released via Instagram
2020	Window Shopper Freestyle	KR$NA	C. Styles & Sire	Uses the instrumental from "Window Shopper" by 50 Cent
2020	Bag	DIVINE ft. KR$NA	NDS, Stunnah Beatz & Progression Music	From the compilation Shutdown by Mass Appeal, Gully Gang and DIVINE
2020	Chaukanna	Raftaar & KR$NA ft. Karan Wahi	Deep Kalsi	Inspired by the Hotstar Specials show Hundred
2020	Woofer 2	Deep Kalsi ft. KR$NA	Deep Kalsi	
2020	Gallan	Deep Kalsi, Harjas, Fateh, KR$NA & Karma	Deep Kalsi	From the EP No Days Off by Deep Kalsi
2020	No Losses	KR$NA	Roclegion & Danny E.B	
2020	Say My Name (Hindi Version)	KR$NA	Call Me G	
2020	Say My Name (English Version)	KR$NA	Call Me G	
2020	Saath Ya Khilaf	KR$NA & Raftaar	Raftaar	
2020	The Key – Freestyle	KR$NA	Deep Kalsi	
2020	Baap Se	Fotty Seven ft. KR$NA	Frisk	From the EP Asli Independent by Fotty Seven
2020	Bohot Sahi	J Trix, SubSpace & KR$NA	SubSpace	From the EP Bohot Sahi by J Trix & SubSpace
2021	Crossroads	Hi-Rez ft. Royce da 5'9" & KR$NA	Ryan Summer	
2021	Khauf Hai	KR$NA	Haji Springer	Collaboration with Realme India
2021	Playground	Hi-Rez ft. KR$NA & KXNG Crooked	Ryan Summer	
2021	Zaruri Nahi	Karma ft. KR$NA	Deep Kalsi	From the album Made You Proud by Karma
2021	Taazi Saans, Taazi Soch	KR$NA	SubSpace	Collaboration with Center Fresh and MTV India
2021	OG	KR$NA	Mandalaz	
2021	No Cap	KR$NA	Enigma	
2021	Overdrive	Hi-Rez ft. KR$NA, Tech N9ne, A-F-R-O, Joell Ortiz, Twista & Bizzy Bone	Ryan Summer	
2022	Ykwim	Karan Aujla & KR$NA ft. Mehar Vaani	Yeah Proof	
2022	Blowing Up	KR$NA	Flexus	
2022	HIGH	Deep Kalsi ft. KR$NA	Deep Kalsi	From the EP WINNERSCIRCLE by Deep Kalsi
2022	ON	Raja Kumari ft. KR$NA	Nacho Larraza & Karan Pandav	From the EP HBIC by Raja Kumari
2022	Lil Bunty	KR$NA	Flamboy	Diss track aimed at Emiway Bantai, in response to the track "Chusamba"
2022	Batman	Aghor ft. KR$NA	AShock	
2022	Machayenge 4	KR$NA	Pendo46	Diss track aimed at Emiway Bantai, in response to his track "KR L$DA SIGN"
2022	Forever	Brodha V ft. KR$NA	Tone Jonez	
2022	I Guess	KR$NA	Kabu Beats	
2022	Tony Montana	Karma & KR$NA	Josh Petruccio	
2022	No China	Raftaar ft. KR$NA	Raftaar & Frisk	From the EP Hard DriveVol.1 by Raftaar
2022	10 Pe 10	KR$NA ft. French The Kid	ditto & leiJA	
2023	Touch Base	Talha Anjum ft. Talhah Yunus & KR$NA	Umair	From the album Open Letter by Talha Anjum
2023	Khatta Flow	Seedhe Maut ft KR$NA	Calm	From the mixtape Lunch Break by Seedhe Maut
2023	Zero After Zero	KR$NA & Talay Riley	Kshmr	From the album KARAM by Kshmr
2023	Paisa On My Mind	Deep Kalsi & KR$NA	Deep Kalsi	From the album Tunnel Vision by Deep Kalsi
2023	Woh Raat	Raftaar & KR$NA	lejJA	Released on the occasion of Raftaar's birthday
2023	No Mercy	Deep Kalsi, Raftaar, KR$NA & Karma	Deep Kalsi	From the album Tunnel Vision by Deep Kalsi
2024	Joota Japani	KR$NA & Mukesh	Umair	Samples the iconic Bollywood song "Mera Joota Hai Japani", from Shree 420 by Mukesh
2024	Hola At Your Boy	Badshah ft. KR$NA & Prajina	Hiten	From the album Ek Tha Raja by Badshah
2024	Refunds	Rap Demon & KR$NA & Dinesh	Umair	From the album Rockstar Without A Guitar by Umair
2025	ASIAN STATE OF MIND	Awich, Jay Park, MaSiWei, Vannda, KR$NA	Diego Ave	
2025	Headlights - Udta Jaaye	KR$NA, Rashmeet Kaur, Alok	Alok	Official anthem for FreeFire Max India, a remix of Alok & Alan Walker's Headlights
2026	Dilli Re	KR$NA		Official anthem of Delhi Capitals for the 2026 IPL
2026	Boom Shaka	KR$NA, Dhanda Nyoliwala	Hisab, Phenom	
2026	Buzz	Seedhe Maut, KR$NA	Calm	
