= Manaktala =

Manaktala or Maniktala is an Indian (Khatri) surname.

== Notables ==
Notable people with the surname include:

- Sanjay Manaktala (fl. 2010–present), American-born Indian stand-up comedian
- Tanya Maniktala (born 1997), Indian actress
- Vikas Manaktala (born 1981), Indian actor

== See also ==
- Maniktala, Neighbourhood in Kolkata in West Bengal, India
