= Brodha V =

Indian rapper (born 1990)

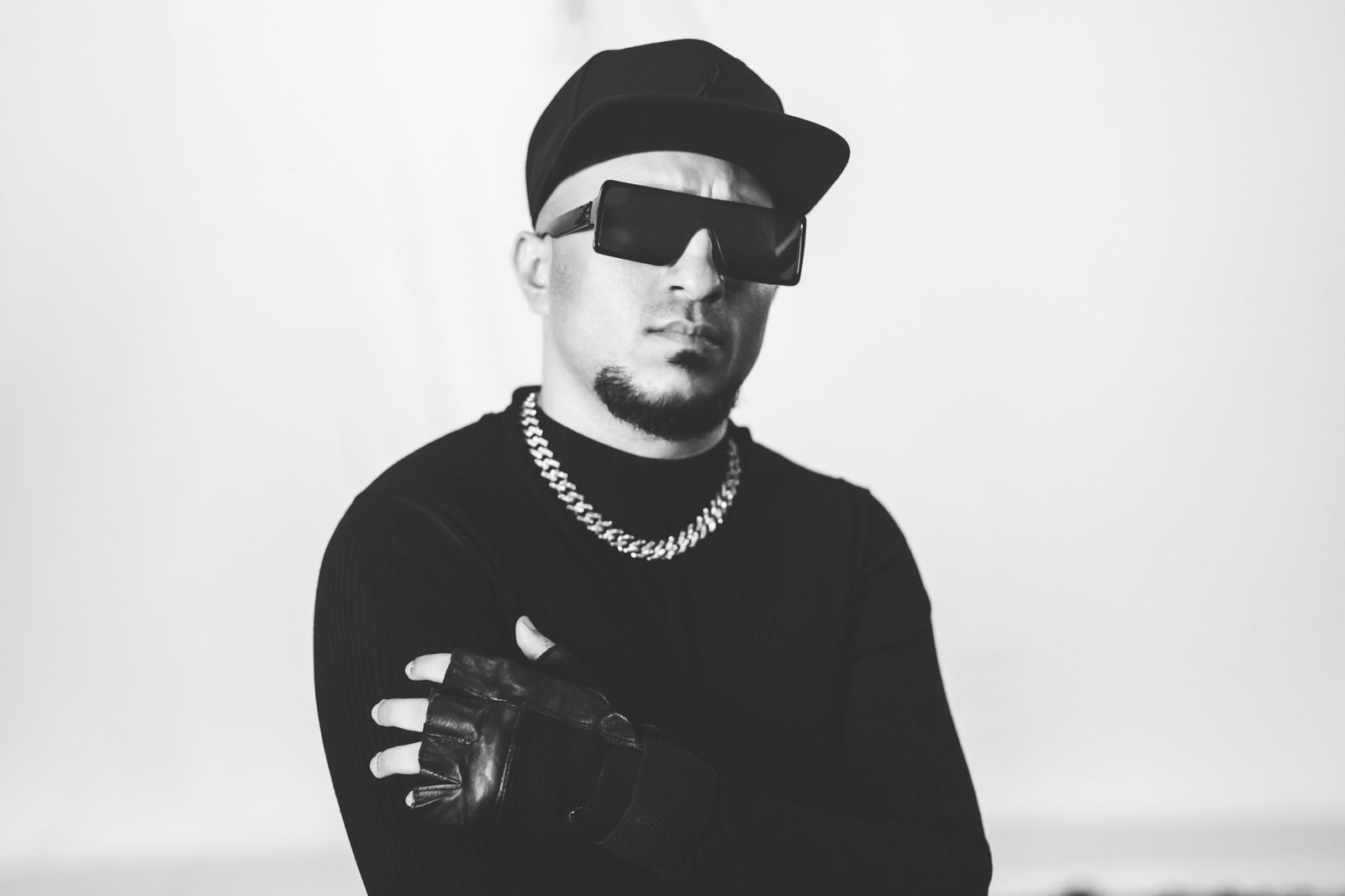
- Born: Vighnesh Shivanand; 27 March 1990 (age 36); Kanchipuram, Tamil Nadu, India
- Occupations: Rapper; singer; songwriter; record producer; lyricist
- Years active: 2008–present
- Musical career
- Origin: Bangalore, Karnataka, India
- Genres: Hip hop; Desi hip-hop
- Labels: Believe Music; Sony Music India; Zee Music Company; Lahari Music; T-Series

Vighnesh Shivanand (born 27 March 1990), better known by his stage name Brodha V, is an Indian rapper, songwriter, and record producer. Born in Kanchipuram, the Bengaluru-based artist started rapping at the age of 18 and took part in online rap battles on Orkut. As an independent artist, Brodha V released a mixtape called Deathpunch! which had a limited release and which garnered him some attention from the hip hop fraternity and the independent music circuit in Southern India.

Storypick called him "one of the best rappers in the country", and he was featured in ScoopWhoop's list of top ten Indian hip-hop artists who deserve more recognition. Rolling Stone India considers him part of "hip-hop's elite". The popularity he garnered led him to be signed by Sony Music India in 2013 and he released his single "Aigiri Nandini" under their banner. He has also collaborated with other artists in the Indian film industry such as Hiphop Tamizha, KR$NA, Raghu Dixit, Vishal Dadlani, Benny Dayal, Raftaar and Anirudh Ravichander.

== Career ==
=== 2008-2012: Early beginnings and Machas with Attitude ===
Brodha V's initial recognition came from active participation in "text battles" on Orkut, a social media network operated by Google. In 2008, Speed Ice and D'Brassic, two Delhi-based rappers, started a forum on Orkut called Insignia which helped found an online space for hip-hop artists to write rap battles. After using battle communities on Orkut to gain recognition and develop a personal style, Brodha V moved on to composing his own songs.

In 2008, he founded Machas With Attitude (MWA) with Smokey the Ghost and Big Nikk. They collaborated with Raghu Dixit and performed the song "Dheaon Dheaon" from the movie Mujhse Fraaandship Karoge. As a solo artist, Brodha V released his first mixtape, Deathpunch!, in 2011, for a limited audience. In 2012, his next single, "On My Own", was praised for its lyrical complexity and innate Indian quality. Gaining recognition, he released the singles "Aathma Raama" and "After Party" in 2012 and 2013 respectively.

=== 2013-2015: Signing with Sony Music India and disbandment of Machas with Attitude ===
In 2013, Machas with Attitude won the Radio City Freedom Award and met Vishal Dadlani, who offered to have them work on the film Chennai Express. This collaboration led them to compose the track "Ready Steady Po" for the film, which brought them further recognition in the music industry. The trio disbanded in 2013 to pursue independent careers.

In 2013, Brodha V signed with Sony Music India. He next released his single "Aigiri Nandini". In 2015, he walked out on his contract with Sony Music, citing creative differences.

With the intention of promoting hip-hop in India, Brodha V organized the first Indian rap cypher in Bangalore in 2014. Subsequent versions of the event were organized in Delhi and Mumbai, with upcoming rappers like Divine and Rawal participating in the cyphers. As a solo artist, Brodha V worked with Anirudh Ravichander ("Why This Kolaveri Di" music director) for the song "Shake That," used in the score for Kaaki Sattai.

Brodha V produced music for and rapped in "Anu Aunty – The Engineering Anthem", along with author, film maker and entrepreneur Varun Agarwal and stand-up comedians Sanjay Manaktala and Sumukhi Suresh, which parodied Iggy Azalea's "Fancy" and went viral on social media. A rapper who changed the face of the Indian music scene, Brodha V was also the inspiration for several prominent rappers to take up rap as a career, including Divine. In 2015, he collaborated with singer Benny Dayal to release the single "Round Round", which was listed as a top 10 track on Saavn. He has also produced music for jingles and anthems.

=== 2016-2019: Brand endorsements and further successes ===
In 2017, Brodha V collaborated with artist Sanjeev Thomas on a campaign to raise awareness for congenital heart defect using heartbeats donated by the public. In 2018, Brodha V stirred up controversy through his song "Shook Ones- Freestyle", which uses the instrumental from American rap duo Mobb Deep's 1995 hit single "Shook Ones, Part II", as he called out artists who plagiarize content from other artists, and drew attention to the disparity in media attention given to artists from South India vs North India. In addition to performing shows across India, Brodha V was also invited to perform for the Music Matters festival in Singapore in 2018.

As an ambassador for the cellphone brand OnePlus, Brodha V hosted and performed in the largest unboxing event conducted for the release of OnePlus 6T that set a Guinness World Record. Brodha V has also featured in the Bollywood movie Gully Boy directed by Zoya Akhtar. Brodha V's collaboration with Delhi-based rapper Raftaar titled "Naachne Ka Shaunq" shot him to fame in mainstream Hindi media in 2019. The track was later included in Raftaar's sophomore album, Mr. Nair. In the same year, Brodha V collaborated with athletic company Puma to promote underground music and hip-hop culture in India. In 2019, Brodha V also released his first ever Kannada rap song, which was his rendition of the song "Maari Kannu" from the 1998 cult classic film A. In the music video, he questioned Indian society and asks everyone to introspect their values.

As a veteran in the Indian rap industry, Brodha V was a guest judge on the Indian rap reality TV show MTV Hustle where he also performed his latest single "Vaishnava Jana To" in the finale. In the socio-political anthem "Vaishnava Jana To" released in October 2019, Brodha V delivered his rendition of the Gandhian bhajan using a unique boom bap sound. The song's lyrics, in line with Mahatma Gandhi's vision of peace and unity, talked about keeping aside differences and looking past religious and cultural backgrounds. Brodha V also released "Vainko", a collaboration with Bangalore-based YouTubers Jordindian, which instantly went viral and led to the "Vainko Challenge".

=== 2020-present: Injury and collaborations ===
In 2020, Brodha V released "Flex" that features Punjabi tunes. Two months later, in February 2021, Brodha V released "Aaraam", his second Kannada track. While speaking about "Aaraam" in an interview with Mid-Day, Brodha V stated that releasing songs in regional languages "lets him reach out to new listeners". Following an injury that set him back during the pandemic, Brodha V released "All Divine" that featured Malayalam lyrics, in February 2022. The song featured singer Steve Knight from Flipsyde and the lyrics focused on Brodha V's "past mental health struggles, the pandemic-enforced isolation and most recently, a torn ligament."

In August 2022, Brodha V released Bujjima that features Indian digital content creator Niharika NM in the music video. In September 2022, Brodha V collaborated with KR$NA and released their much awaited track "Forever" where the two rappers showcased their penmanship. The song won them the Radio City Freedom Award for the Best Indie Collaboration in 2023. Following the success of Vainko, Brodha V collaborated with comedic duo Jordindian again in 2023 to release "Basti Bounce" which is touted as the successor for Vainko.

In May 2023, Brodha V released his first love song "Azhage" which he stated was a personal challenge to channel deep emotions to expand on his versatility. In March 2024, Brodha V performed at the Royal Challengers Bangalore Unbox event at M. Chinnaswamy Stadium. In December 2024, he released "Dance Away the Night (DATN)", in collaboration with fellow rapper Paal Dabba with a combination of Tamil and English rap lyrics, that addressed the trials and tribulations both artists have faced in their respective careers. In an interview discussing the shoot for DATN with The Indian Express's lifestyle paper Indulge, Brodha V shared his background education in filmmaking and talked about his work behind the camera exploring video direction.

Shortly after, in January 2025, Brodha V released his third Kannada track "Hengaithe Maige", garnering a lot of attention in Karnataka and South India. His second release for the year, "OM", that features the Gayatri Mantra chant received significant attention domestically as well as internationally. In this track, Brodha V shows his journey from his younger days to now and is his most intimate and self-reflective track to date. In December 2025, Brodha V released a track titled "Underrated", in collaboration with Def Jam India. In 2026, Brodha V made his debut in Malayalam cinema with the track "High Stakes" for the film I'm Game starring Dulquer Salmaan.

== Etymology behind the stage name ==
Brodha V revealed in an interview to Raaj Jones that his stage name, Brodha V is derived from two elements, the first fragment stands for brotherhood, while the second stands for his real name, Vighnesh.

== Musical style ==
Brodha V's style is a blend of hip-hop, Hindustani classical, Carnatic classical and Indian folk music. Most of his work is delivered in common language, drawn from his own personal experiences.

== Influences ==
Brodha V mentions the song "Pettai Rap", composed by A. R. Rahman for the Tamil film Kaadhalan, as his introduction to rap music. He also cites early '90s East coast rappers Eminem, Rakim, Nas, Big Pun, Wu-Tang Clan and Jay-Z as his inspiration and role models. As a producer, he refers to Timbaland, Pharrell Williams and Quincy Jones for inspiration.

== Discography ==
=== Mixtapes ===
- Deathpunch! (2011)

=== Singles & collaborations ===
Year	Track	Artist(s)	Producer(s)	Note(s)
2012	On My Own	Brodha V ft. Avinash Bhat		
2012	Aathma Raama	Brodha V		Was previously released as a part of his debut demo mixtape Deathpunch!
2013	After Party	Brodha V		
2014	Roobaroo - Micromax Unite Anthem	Swaroop Khan, Kamal Khan, Benny Dayal, Raghu Dixit, Apeksha Dandekar, Shruti Pathak, Neeti Mohan, Sanam Puri, Brodha V & Voctronica	Dub Sharma	
2014	Aigiri Nandini	Brodha V		
2015	Indian Flava (Live version)	Brodha V		
2016	Round Round	Brodha V ft. Benny Dayal		
2017	Let Em Talk	Brodha V		
2018	Way Too Easy	Brodha V		
2018	Shook Ones Freestyle	Brodha V		
2018	Young and Restless	Brodha V		Promotional track for Spykar Jeans
2019	Naachne Ka Shaunq	Raftaar ft. Brodha V	Tom Enzy	From the album Mr. Nair by Raftaar
2019	Maari Kannu	Brodha V, Sukruth Mallesh & Guru Kiran		
2019	Silk Board Shuffle	Brodha V		Promotional track for NBA India
2019	Vaishnava Jana To	Brodha V ft. Aishwarya Rangarajan		
2019	Vainko	Brodha V and Jordindian		
2020	Whoa (The Passioneering Anthem)	Brodha V		
2020	Flex	Brodha V		
2021	Aaraam	Brodha V		
2021	Booyah For Your City!	Ikka, Brodha V, Cizzy, StreetViolater & Kidshot		Promotional track for Garena Free Fire India
2022	All Divine	Brodha V & Steve Knight		
2022	Bujjima	Brodha V	Bharath MD	
2022	Forever	Brodha V ft. KR$NA	Tone Jonez	
2023	Basti Bounce	Brodha V and Jordindian		
2023	Azhage	Brodha V	Brodha V	
2023	Moodu	Brodha V	Vighnesh S, Manaswi Gundi	
2024	Dance Away The Night (DATN)	Brodha V ft. Paal Dabba	Vighnesh S.	
2025	Hengaithe Maige	Brodha V	Vighnesh S.	
2025	OM	Brodha V	Vighnesh S.	
2025	Underrated	Brodha V	Vighnesh S.	

=== Film music ===
Year	Film	Song	Language
2010	Nil Gavani Sellathey	Vanavillum	Tamil
2011	Mujhse Fraaandship Karoge	Dheaon Dheaon	Hindi
2013	Chennai Express	Ready Steady Po	Hindi
2015	Kaaki Sattai	Shake That	Tamil
2018	Krishnarjuna Yudham	Turn This Party Up	Telugu
2019	Jersey	Padhe Padhe	Telugu
2024	Kadaisi Ulaga Por	I am a Beast	English, Tamil
2026	I'm Game	High Stakes	English, Malayalam

== Awards and nominations ==
- Radio City Freedom Awards 2013: Best Hip Hop/Rap Artist – ("Indian Flava") – Winner (Judge's Choice Award)
- Radio City Freedom Awards 2014: Best Hip Hop/Rap Artist – ("After Party") – Nominated
- Vh1 Sound Nation Awards 2014 – Best Hip Hop Act – Nominated
- Radio City Freedom Awards 2015: Best Hip Hop/Rap Artist – (Indian Rap Cypher/"Aigiri Nandini") – Nominated
- GIMA 2015: Best Music Debut Non-Film ("Aigiri Nandini") – Nominated
- Renault Free the Music Award 2015 for Contribution to Independent Music – Winner
- Radio City Freedom Awards 2016 : Best Indie Collaboration of the Year – ("Round Round") – Nominated
- Radio City Freedom Awards 2018: Best Hip Hop Artist of the Year (Jury Award)- Let em Talk
- Radio City Freedom Awards 2018: Best Hip Hop Artist of the Year (Jury Award)- Way Too Easy
- Radio City Freedom Awards 2023: Best Hip Hop Collaboration of the Year - Forever ft. KRSNA
- The CLEF Music Awards 2023: Best regional song/album Tamil - Basti Bounce
