= I'm Game (soundtrack) =

2026 film soundtrack album

- Soundtrack album cover

Soundtrack album by Jakes Bejoy
- Released: 29 August 2026 (original); 19 September 2026 (extended)
- Recorded: 2025–2026
- Studios: Mindscore Studio, Kochi; The Sanctuary Audio Visual Studio, Mumbai; Pop Media House, Kochi; MLounge, Kochi; K7 Studios, Kochi; Jubilee 10 Studio, Hyderabad; Sound Town Studio, Chennai
- Genre: Feature film soundtrack
- Length: 18:50
- Languages: Malayalam; English; Tamil
- Label: Zee Music Company
- Producer: Jakes Bejoy

Jakes Bejoy chronology
Khalifa: The Ruler (2026)	I'm Game (2026)	Athimanoharam (2026)
External audio
- I'm Game – Official Audio Jukebox on YouTube

Singles from I'm Game
- 1. "Mazhavillaye" Released: 10 August 2026; 2. "Loser" Released: 27 August 2026

I'm Game is the soundtrack album to the 2026 Malayalam-language fantasy action film of the same name, directed by Nahas Hidhayath and produced by Dulquer Salmaan with Jom Varghese under Wayfarer Films, starring Salmaan, alongside Antony Varghese, Mysskin, Kayadu Lohar, Samyuktha Viswanathan, Kathir, Vinay Forrt and Parth Tiwari. The album is composed by Jakes Bejoy, featuring five tracks, with lyrics by Sharfu, Suhail Koya, Reble, Neeraj Madhav, Baby Jean, Zeba Tommy, Adhri Joe, Brodha V, Vedan, Evugin and Bejoy himself. Led by two singles, the soundtrack was released under the label of Zee Music Company, on 29 August 2026 at the audio launch event in Kochi. An extended album featuring five more additional tracks, was released on 19 September, two weeks after the film's release.

== Background ==
Jakes Bejoy composed the film score and soundtrack to I'm Game marking his first collaboration with Nahas and third collaboration with Dulquer after Salute (2022) and King of Kotha (2023). Bejoy noted that he read the script for I'm Game two years ago and was excited on how the film shaped up. The album accompanied stylish, electronic textures to suit the world the film was set in.

Armaan Malik recorded the song "Mazhavillaye" for this film, making his comeback to Malayalam cinema after singing "Njaan Varumee Paadhaiyilaai" from Theeram (2017). Regarding his involvement, Armaan said he wanted to sing for Malayalam songs for a long time, after performing for Tamil, Kannada and Telugu languages. Despite the difficulties in pronouncing Malayalam, which he considered the most challenging for him, he was guided by the lyric writer and language pronunciation team to help the process much easier.

Dulquer Salmaan recorded the "stylish and energetic" introduction track "Loser" upon Bejoy's insistence, that accompanied multilingual versions to appeal to all sections of audience. Zeba Tommy, who was known for the breakout single "Queen of the Night" from Lokah Chapter 1: Chandra (2025), that involved Dulquer as a producer and composed by Bejoy, had recorded the song "Flesh & Blood" which featured in the trailer. The song was not intended to be a full-fledged version being a part of the film, but after its response, the team decided to record that track with Baby Jean also being the co-singer.

== Release ==
The film's music rights were acquired by Zee Music Company, for ₹12.5 crore (US$1.3 million), which is considered to the biggest deal for Malayalam films. The soundtrack was preceded with "Mazhavillaye" as the first single on 10 August 2026. The second single "Loser" was premiered exclusively at the Indian Film Festival of Melbourne (IFFM) on 15 August, before being officially released on 27 August. The film's music launch was held at the Kinfra Film and Video Park at Kakkanad, Kochi on 29 August. An extended album featuring additional songs that were not included in the initial album release, was later released on 19 September.

== Track listing ==
=== Malayalam ===
No.	Title	Lyrics	Singer(s)	Length
1.	"High Stakes"	Brodha V, Muthu, Clint Lewis	Brodha V, Shan Vincent de Paul, Amogh Balaji, Jakes Bejoy	3:10
2.	"Mazhavillaye"	Sharfu	Armaan Malik	4:24
3.	"Flesh & Blood"	Adhri Joe	Baby Jean, Zeba Tommy, Jakes Bejoy	2:56
4.	"Loser Song"	Suhail Koya, Neeraj Madhav, Reble	Dulquer Salmaan, Neeraj Madhav, Reble, Jakes Bejoy	4:34
5.	"Theekkali Aarambham"	Vedan, Adhri Joe	Vedan, Jakes Bejoy, Evugin	3:46
Total length:				18:52

Extended soundtrack
No.	Title	Lyrics	Singer(s)	Length
6.	"Enthadi Poove"	B. K. Harinarayanan	Sooraj Santhosh	3:23
7.	"Karavum Karalum"	B. K. Harinarayanan	Evugin	2:19
8.	"Dheerane – Rise of Vicky"	Arivu, Vinayak Sasikumar	Arivu, Anand Sreeraj	3:37
9.	"Slap Song"	Suhail Koya	Joel Johns	3:47
10.	"I'm Game Trailer Theme"	Zeba Tommy	Baby Jean, Zeba Tommy	2:44
Total length:				34:45

=== Tamil ===
No.	Title	Lyrics	Singer(s)	Length
1.	"High Stakes"	Brodha V, Vignesh Ramakrishna, Clint Lewis	Brodha V, Shridhar Ramesh	3:10
2.	"Arugey Arugey"	Vignesh Ramakrishna	Armaan Malik	4:24
3.	"Loser Song"	Vignesh Ramakrishna, Neeraj Madhav, Reble	Benny Dayal, Neeraj Madhav, Reble, Jakes Bejoy	4:34
Total length:				12:09

Extended soundtrack
No.	Title	Lyrics	Singer(s)	Length
4.	"Kanmani Poovey"	Vignesh Ramakrishna	Anand Aravindakshan	3:23
5.	"Karayil Nuraigal"	Vignesh Ramakrishna	Ritesh G Rao	2:19
6.	"Veeraney – Rise of Vicky"	Arivu, Vignesh Ramakrishna	Arivu, Deepak Blue	3:37
7.	"Slap Song"	Vignesh Ramakrishna	Anthony Daasan	3:47
Total length:				25:17

=== Telugu ===
No.	Title	Lyrics	Singer(s)	Length
1.	"High Stakes"	Brodha V, Sanare, Clint Lewis	Brodha V	3:10
2.	"Evare Nuvve"	Sanare	Armaan Malik	4:24
3.	"Loser Song"	Sanare, Neeraj Madhav, Reble	Benny Dayal, Neeraj Madhav, Reble, Jakes Bejoy	4:34
Total length:				12:09

Extended soundtrack
No.	Title	Lyrics	Singer(s)	Length
4.	"Gundelo Nuvve"	Sanare	Krishna Tejaswi	3:23
5.	"Manase Chedhire"	Sanare	Ritesh G Rao	2:19
6.	"Yuddhame – Rise of Vicky"	Arivu, Sanare	Arivu, Deepak Blue	3:37
7.	"Slap Song"	Sanare	Arun Kaundinya	3:47
Total length:				25:17

=== Kannada ===
No.	Title	Lyrics	Singer(s)	Length
1.	"High Stakes"	Brodha V, Hrudaya Shiva, Clint Lewis	Brodha V, Akhil Chandra	3:10
2.	"Malebillaagi"	Hrudaya Shiva	Anirudh Suswaram	4:24
3.	"Loser Song"	Hrudaya Shiva, Neeraj Madhav, Reble	Sai Madhav Rella, Neeraj Madhav, Reble, Jakes Bejoy	4:34
Total length:				12:09

Extended soundtrack
No.	Title	Lyrics	Singer(s)	Length
4.	"Nangella Neene"	Hrudaya Shiva	Krishna Tejaswi	3:23
5.	"Kanasu Kamari"	Hrudaya Shiva	Ritesh G Rao	2:19
6.	"Veerane – Rise of Vicky"	Arivu, Hrudaya Shiva	Arivu, Deepak Blue	3:37
7.	"Slap Song"	Hrudaya Shiva	Arun Kaundinya	3:47
Total length:				25:17

=== Hindi ===
No.	Title	Lyrics	Singer(s)	Length
1.	"High Stakes"	Brodha V, Numan Khoker, Clint Lewis	Brodha V, Junaid Kumar	3:10
2.	"Dil Dhadkaye"	Numan Khoker	Armaan Malik	4:24
3.	"Loser Song"	Numan Khoker, Neeraj Madhav, Reble	Benny Dayal, Neeraj Madhav, Reble, Jakes Bejoy	4:34
Total length:				12:09

Extended soundtrack
No.	Title	Lyrics	Singer(s)	Length
4.	"Subha Se Shamein"	Numan Khoker	Amaan	3:23
5.	"Zindagi Roothi Hai"	Numan Khoker	Ritesh G Rao	2:19
6.	"Jee Kare – Rise of Vicky"	Arivu, Numan Khoker	Arivu, Deepak Blue	3:37
7.	"Slap Song"	Numan Khoker	Bilal Quadri	3:47
8.	"I'm Game Trailer Theme"	Zeba Tommy	Baby Jean, Zeba Tommy	2:44
Total length:				25:17

== Reception ==
Anandu Suresh of The Indian Express wrote "Jakes Bejoy does a tremendous job with his electrifying music, especially when the movie doesn't have much else to offer." Vishal Menon of The Hollywood Reporter India described it as a "funky score". Vignesh Madhu of Cinema Express wrote "Jakes Bejoy's high decibel music only adds to the woes." Gopika Is of The Times of India wrote "Jakes Bejoy's background score further elevates these moments, especially when the film leans into its larger-than-life treatment." Latha Srinivasan of NDTV called the music as "uplifting" though it did little to elevate the film.

Sia Viju of Mathrubhumi wrote "Jakes Bejoy's background score does much of the heavy lifting when it comes to maintaining momentum. His music gives the action sequences an added charge and knows when to build tension around a scene. The score becomes an important part of the film's theatrical appeal rather than merely accompanying the visuals." Princy Alexander of Onmanorama wrote "Jakes Bejoy's music adds considerable energy to the proceedings". T. Maruthi Acharya of India Today wrote "Jakes Bejoy's score complements the film's mood, coming alive during the action set pieces." Manivasagan Namasivayam of DT Next said, "Jakes Bejoy's lively score is another strength."

== Personnel ==
Credits adapted from Zee Music Company:

- Music composer: Jakes Bejoy
- Music producers: Jakes Bejoy, Agastya Raag, K C Balasarangan, Agastya Raag, Maneesh Shaji, Prakash Alex, Harishankar V
- Session arrangement and management: Khalid Naj, Sajin Sam
- Project manager: Adi Manvin
- Studio manager: Don Vincent
- Music marketing head: Vipin Kumar
- Studios: Mindscore Studio, Kochi; The Sanctuary Audio Visual Studio, Mumbai; Pop Media House, Kochi; MLounge, Kochi; K7 Studios, Kochi; Jubilee 10 Studio, Hyderabad; Sound Town Studio, Chennai
- Recording engineers: Midhun Anand, Unmesh Unnikrishnan, Khalid Naj, Amey Londhe, Aniruddh Khanna, Vedant Uttarkar, Pete Dane, Jisto George, Amal Raj, Aswin Kumar, Rakesh Mickey, Sankeerth Shaji
- Mixing and mastering engineers: Balu Thankachan, Akash Shravan, Midhun Anand
- Mixing assistance: Sreenivasa Sharma
- Artist co-ordination: K D Vincent, Don Vincent

Vocalists

- Backing vocals: Akhil J Chand, Anila Rajeev, Ajmal Fathima Parveen, Akash B H, Akhil Dev, Amal C Ajith, Amitav Suresh, Christakala, Jerine Anna John, K C Balasarangan, Kanjana Sriram, Milan Joy, Riya Anna Roy, Soorya Shyam Gopal, Sony Mohan, Jasim Jamal, Jijin Jose
- Kids vocals: Norah Ann Jakes, Rose Jakes, Nila Raj, Chinmayi Kiran Lal, Aadya Ramesh, Medha Ganesh, Shrita Ganesh, Bhadra Hari
- Choir: El Fé Choir
- Choir conductor: Roe Vincent
- Vocals arrangement and production: Akhil J Chand
- Additional vocal production: Athul Martin
- Vocal editor: Soorya Shyam Gopal

Instrumentalists

- Guitars: Godfrey Immanuel, Khalid Naj
- Violin: Embar Kannan
- Strings: Cochin Strings Orchestra
- Percussion: Sandeep Venkitesh
- Bass: Napier Naveen
- Flute: Subin Jerson
- Trumpet: Trumpet Babu, Viji
- Brass: Viji
