= MojoJojo =

Indian Musician

- Born: Akshay Johar; New Delhi, India
- Occupations: Musician; DJ; Record Producer
- Years active: 2014–present
- Musical career
- Genres: EDM; Indie Pop; Trap; Dubstep; Hip hop; D&B; Moombahton; Dancehall; Lo-fi
- Instruments: Bass; Keys
- Labels: Times Music; Hattke Records; Mojo Records
- Website: mojojojomusic.com

Akshay Johar, known professionally as MojoJojo, is an Indian DJ and record producer. He began his musical career as a bass guitarist with the rock band Paradigm Shift and later rose to prominence as an independent artist and producer.

MojoJojo started learning the piano at the age of ten and subsequently picked up the guitar during his college years. He played as a bassist in bands such as The Gravy Train and The Doppler Effect before transitioning into record production in 2015. His debut album, Shots Fired, released in the same year, received critical acclaim. He was awarded the Radio City Freedom Award for Best Electronica Artist and was nominated for a Global Indian Music Academy (GiMA) Award.

== Biography ==
=== Early life ===
Akshay Johar was born in New Delhi and attended Delhi Public School, R.K. Puram, where he developed a keen interest in music. He learned to play the piano and acoustic guitar during his school years but did not initially pursue music as a career. It was only in his final years at school that he joined a band and began playing the bass guitar.

Johar completed his higher education in New Delhi, where he continued his involvement in music. During his college years, he performed with various independent artists and bands, including Paradigm Shift, Gravy Train, Barefaced Liar, and The Doppler Effect.

=== Career ===
After performing as a bass guitarist with Prateek Kuhad's band in 2014, MojoJojo decided to pursue a full-time career in record production. In 2015, he made his debut with an EP titled Bass Bahar, a collection of remixed Bollywood tracks. Later that year, he released his first full-length album, Shots Fired, an electronic music collection. The album was released on 1 October under the Times Music label and featured nine tracks with contributions from artists including KR$NA, Sound Avtar, Tanya Nambiar, and Bawari Basanti.

In an interview with RSJOnline.com, MojoJojo spoke about the creative process behind the album, which began in late 2014 with the writing of tracks such as "Storm". He expressed a desire to move beyond the conventions of EDM stating, "My contention with that grouping is that it's looked upon more as a trend and a fad, [an] easy route to become popular and got a negative connotation." The track "Storm" featured vocals by classical artist Bawari Basanti and included live piano and cello recordings, while another track, "Nepal", featured live drums. In an interview with Mumbai Mirror, he described the experimental nature of the album: "I was trying to find my sound — each song on it was a different sub-genre — from drum 'n' bass to moombahton to future bass".

"The music landscape in India transformed between my albums. In 2015, I think all underground artists were starting to transition to other streaming platforms. [...] That’s why we’ve had the boom in hip-hop and why singer-songwriters are doing well now." — MojoJojo, in an interview with Mumbai Mirror

The album received a positive response upon release. "Storm" earned him a nomination for Best Electronic Track at the 2016 Global Indian Music Academy Awards. Another track from the album, "Thar Bomb", which incorporated tribal chants from the Thar region, won him the award for Best Electronica Artist at the Radio City Freedom Awards.

Since then, MojoJojo has released several singles. His second EP, Sapne, was released in 2018 to a favourable audience response. His second full-length album, Andarrated, has also been released.

== Discography ==
=== Studio albums ===
Year	Album / EP	Track(s)	Artist(s)	Note(s)
2014	Bass Bahar		MojoJojo	EP Remixes of Bollywood songs
2015	Shots Fired	Storm	MojoJojo ft. Bawari Basanti	First album
2015	Shots Fired	Greed is Good	MojoJojo & Nanok ft. Reisa	First album
2015	Shots Fired	Rise and Fall	MojoJojo ft. Tanya Nambiar	First album
2015	Shots Fired	Thar Bomb	MojoJojo	First album
2015	Shots Fired	Shots Fired	MojoJojo & Sound Avtar ft. KR$NA	First album
2015	Shots Fired	Nepal	MojoJojo	First album
2015	Shots Fired	Jungle Raj	MojoJojo ft. KR$NA	First album
2015	Shots Fired	Pick It Up	MojoJojo ft. Chetan Awasthi	First album
2015	Shots Fired	Yogic Jogging	MojoJojo	First album
2018	Sapne	Sapne	MojoJojo ft. Tyesha Kohli	EP
2018	Sapne	Akela	MojoJojo ft. Akshay Oberoi	EP
2018	Sapne	Main Chala	MojoJojo ft. Saptak Chatterjee	EP
2021	Andarrated	Issa Vibe	MojoJojo ft. Dee MC & Abhinav Bhardwaj	Second album
2021	Andarrated	Copy Paste	MojoJojo ft. Sikander Kahlon, Harjas Harjaayi & Shah Rule	Second album
2021	Andarrated	Dillagi	MojoJojo	Second album
2021	Andarrated	Judaai	MojoJojo ft. Shen B & Tyesha Kohli	Second album
2021	Andarrated	Swaad	MojoJojo ft. Rebel 7	Second album
2021	Andarrated	Duniya	MojoJojo	Second album
2021	Andarrated	Digi Daga	MojoJojo	Second album
2021	Andarrated	Rang	MojoJojo ft. Richa	Second album
2021	Andarrated	Maahi	MojoJojo	Second album
2021	Andarrated	Sone De	MojoJojo ft. Tyesha Kohli & Akshay Oberoi	Second album
2021	Andarrated	Ankhiyan	MojoJojo	Second album
2021	Andarrated	Piya	MojoJojo ft. Dhaval Kothari & Rebel 7	Second album
2021	Andarrated	Bekhudi	MojoJojo ft. Abhinav Bhardwaj	Second album

=== Singles and collaborations ===
Year	Track	Artist(s)
2017	Shankar	MojoJojo
2018	Chak Bass	MojoJojo ft. Sikander
2019	Mawali Qawali	MojoJojo ft. D'Evil
2019	Galat Launda	Fotty Seven ft. MojoJojo
2020	Bola Tha Na - Beck's Ice Smooth Anthem	MojoJojo & Burrah ft. Fotty Seven
2020	Thandi Hawa (MojoJojo Remix)	Ritviz & MojoJojo
