= Naachne Ka Shaunq =

Single by Raftaar featuring Brodha V

Single by Raftaar and Brodha V

from the album Mr. Nair
- Language: Hindi; English
- Released: 11 February 2019
- Genre: Desi hip hop
- Length: 3:41 (Music video); 3:37 (Audio)
- Label: Zee Music Company
- Songwriters: Raftaar; Brodha V
- Producer: Tom Enzy

Music video
- "Naachne Ka Shaunq" on YouTube

"Naachne Ka Shaunq" (transl. Desire to Dance) is a desi hip hop song by Indian rapper Raftaar featuring Brodha V, released by Zee Music Company on 11 February 2019. It is the 12th track from Raftaar's album, Mr. Nair.

== Background ==
The song is about the current situation in Indian hip hop. People only listen and mindlessly dance to the beat, not understanding the meaning of the song and the lyrics. Raftaar also takes shots at the pop music genre, in an attempt to show the Indian public that they only listen to songs which are party numbers.

The song heavily samples comedian and rapper, Big Shaq's 2017 hit single "Man's Not Hot". Raftaar references the song by rapping, "The thing goes skrrrahh...", a line used in Shaq's song. There are also disses targeted at American rapper Lil Pump. Raftaar mentions the song "Gucci Gang", telling the audience to stop listening to such music.

Brodha V also critiques the music industry highlighting the language barrier in India. He suggests he would be more successful in his career if the industry was not so Hindi-dominated. He raps about the condition of songs that tell the truth, and about his experiences in the music industry.

== Reception ==
The song's music video received 5 million views on YouTube in one day. It is one of the most viewed Indian hip hop songs on YouTube, currently having 53 million views (as of 2025).
