= Khalifa: The Ruler =

2026 Indian film by Vysakh

Khalifa
- Theatrical release poster
- Directed by: Vysakh
- Written by: Jinu V. Abraham
- Produced by: Jinu V. Abraham; Suraj Kumar
- Starring: Prithviraj Sukumaran; Neil Nitin Mukesh; Malvika Sharma; Renji Panicker
- Cinematography: Jomon T. John
- Edited by: Chaman Chacko
- Music by: Jakes Bejoy
- Production company: Jiinu Abraham Innovations
- Distributed by: Aashirvad Release (Kerala); Jiinu Abraham Innovations (Overseas)
- Release date: 20 August 2026
- Running time: 159 minutes
- Country: India
- Language: Malayalam
- Box office: ₹53 crore

Khalifa (Note: With the tagline Vengeance will be written in Gold.) is a 2026 Indian Malayalam-language action thriller film directed by Vysakh and written by Jinu V. Abraham, who also co-produced the film along with Suraj Kumar. Intended as the first instalment of a two-part series, it stars Prithviraj Sukumaran in title role alongside Neil Nitin Mukesh, Suresh Oberoi, Malvika Sharma, Sanju Sivram, Shammi Thilakan, Renji Panicker, Shivajith Padmanabhan, Kyraa Vasudevan and Indrans in supporting roles, alongside Mohanlal, Tovino Thomas and Soubin Shahir in cameo appearances.

Principal photography began in July 2025 and concluded by June 2026. Filming took place across Kerala, London, Dubai, Abu Dhabi,Tamil Nadu and Nepal. The film's cinematography, editing, music, action and choreography are done by Jomon T. John, Chaman Chacko, Jakes Bejoy, Yannick Ben, Chethan D'Souza and Sandy respectively.

Khalifa was theatrically released on 20 August 2026, coinciding with Onam weekend. It received mixed to positive reviews from critics and audiences, with some criticising its conventional gangster narrative reminiscent of films from the 1980s and 1990s, while Prithviraj's performance, Mohanlal's cameo appearance, soundtrack and action choreography received praise.

== Plot ==
Samad “Sami” returns to Kerala from Dubai to attend his sister’s wedding. On his way back, he is taken into the customs office by the police. They question him about the whereabouts of Aamir Ali, his best friend and brother-in-law, and his family’s gold-smuggling business. Party secretary Punnavel Raghavan informs Sami that a phone call had turned Sami in, forcing Sami to call that number, which was Aamir's, to test the latter's loyalty. Aamir, who has been living in exile in London for years, picks up the call, and tells him it was indeed him that turned Sami in.

A few years earlier, Aamir lives a peaceful life with his family and spends his free time with Sami and their friends. His father, Younus Ali, is a successful businessman who runs a textile shop in Koduvally, Kozhikode, with Aamir. When Aamir’s grandfather wishes to see him married, his mother, Noorjahan, arranges a meeting with Fiza. Aamir falls in love with her, and they soon get married. However, their happiness does not last long. Younus is struggling with debts worth crores and mortgages his house to buy equipment from Germany. He hopes to sell the equipment and clear his bills.

Aamir accompanies his father to the shipyard to check the shipment. He soon discovers that the equipment is not listed in the export documents. Customs officers led by Panicker inspect the container and find a gold bar hidden among the equipment. Younus is arrested for gold smuggling. Panicker also reveals that Younus is the son of Mambarakkal Ahmed Ali, a notorious gold smuggler who was responsible for the introduction of the COFEPOSA Act in India. However, Younus has always refused to follow his father's criminal ways. When Aamir meets a lawyer, he learns that the case involves a gold bar worth two crores and that he must arrange sixty lakhs to move the case forward.

Younus later reveals that he has been framed by Raghavan and Harris Basheer, the managing director of Calicut Global. Harris had offered to help clear Younus's debts if he allowed his shipping containers to be used for smuggling gold into India. Younus refused because he did not want to get involved in illegal activities. To punish him, Raghavan and Harris secretly planted gold inside one of his shipments and made him look like a smuggler.

Desperate to save his father, Aamir decides to steal gold from Harris and Raghavan's next shipment. He succeeds after fighting Vinayakan, Raghavan's elder son, and takes the vehicle carrying the gold to Seitturaj, a trusted associate of Ahmed Ali. Seitturaj promises to pay Aamir for the gold, but Harris tries to take it back. Seitturaj refuses, creating further problems between them. Younus is eventually released from prison and returns home to his family. However, he learns that their house is about to be taken away because of the mortgage. Aamir and Younus visit the cooperative bank and discover that they must arrange nine crores to settle half of their outstanding bills. Even the Home Minister rejects Younus's request for help. Feeling helpless, Younus attempts to end his life, but Aamir stops him.

With no other choice, Aamir travels to Dubai with Sami and starts smuggling gold. They find different ways to hide the gold so that airport authorities cannot detect it. They also work with other passengers and Vyshnavi, an air hostess who helps them transport gold hidden in specially made gold nails. Their business grows, and they make deals with Seitturaj. During this period, Fiza gives birth to a baby boy. When Aamir returns home, Younus refuses to accept his actions. He warns Aamir that his son should never follow the path of Ahmed Ali, even if Aamir entered the criminal world to save his family.

Meanwhile, Harris wants Seitturaj to sell gold at a fixed rate. Seitturaj refuses and lowers the rates to keep his customers. Enraged by this decision, Harris hires a professional shooter from Goa to kill him. Seitturaj survives the attack and is taken to hospital. When Aamir visits him, Seitturaj reveals that the shooter was hired to kill him and advises Aamir not to seek revenge. Later, one of Aamir's associates is caught at the airport carrying gold bars. She reveals that Harris and Raghavan are behind the smuggling operation, forcing Raghavan to resign from his political position. Soon after, Vyshnavi dies in a road accident while travelling with her fiancé, who survives. Aamir returns to Kerala and is chased by Vinayakan and his men. During the confrontation, an accident leaves them apparently dead. Aamir is shocked by what happens, while Younus suffers a severe panic attack that leaves him paralysed.

Back in the present, Aamir explains why he cut ties with Sami in Dubai. Sami had become careless and spent most of his time with friends instead of taking their business seriously. After several failed attempts to change him, Aamir blocks their joint bank accounts. Sami is later caught carrying gold at the airport during his first trip. Feeling helpless, he accepts an offer from Harris's associates. They promise to help him start a business in Dubai, but their real plan is to get him arrested and bring Aamir back to Kerala. However, Aamir manages to ruin their plans.

Harris then sends assassins to Aamir's house. The security guards fight them, but Younus is brutally killed. Noorjahan, Fiza and their son manage to escape. Aamir returns to Kerala and is arrested. The court allows him to perform his father's last rites, and although Seitturaj offers to help him escape, Aamir decides to surrender. He later reunites with Sami in prison. Soon after, Aamir is called to a private chamber where Harris and Raghavan are waiting to kill him. Aamir is shocked to discover that Vinayakan survived the earlier accident but was left with severe burns and a disfigured face. After a long fight, Aamir kills Harris but spares Raghavan, believing that the suffering caused by his son's condition is punishment enough.

Aamir later returns to his family and tries to rebuild his life. However, he receives a call from Nepal informing him that Ahmed Ali is being released after serving a long prison sentence. Ahmed Ali tells Aamir not to spare anyone who destroyed their family's legacy, and Aamir promises to fulfil his wish. In the end, it is revealed that Iver Alexander, one of Ahmed Ali's hired assassins, has killed Raghavan and his younger son.

== Cast ==
- Prithviraj Sukumaran as Mambarakkal Aamir Ali "Aali"
- Neil Nitin Mukesh as Harris Basheer
- Suresh Oberoi as Seitraj Singh "Seittuji", Ahammed Ali's friend and Aamir's mentor
- Malvika Sharma as Fiza Ali, Aamir's wife
- Sanju Sivram as Samad "Sami", Aamir's best friend and ally
- Renji Panicker as Mambarakkal Younus Ali, Aamir's father and Ahammed Ali's son
- Shammi Thilakan as Party Secretary Punnavel Raghavan: Harris Basheer's business partner and ally
- Indrans as Hamsa / Hamsakka, Aamir Ali's right-hand and Ahammed Ali's ally
- Mohini as Noorjahan Ali, Aamir's mother and Younus Ali's wife
- Shivajith as Vinayakan Raghavan, Raghavan's elder son
- Kyraa Vasudevan as Vyshnavi Ramachandran, Aamir's friend and airhostess
- Anand Manmadhan as Rahim, Aamir's friend and ally
- Sudheer Karamana as CI Salim
- Sijoy Varghese as Customs Officer
- Joy Mathew as Minister Sahib
- Mohan Sharma as Aamir's Maternal grandfather and Noorjahan's father
- Sadiq as former customs commissioner Sebastian
- Meera Nair as Customs Officer Priya Sebastian, Sebastian's daughter
- Aruldoss as Customs Officer Saravanan, Harris Basheer's ally
- Pasupathi Raj as Custom Officer Veeraswami, Seittuji's old friend
- Nisthar Sait as Jail Superintendent
- James Eliya as Jail Warden
- Rajesh Babu as Judge
- John Vijay as Union Minister for Civil Aviation Selvam
- Master Nafash as Rushin Ali, Aamir and Fiza's son
- Shine Varghese as Sudeep, Aamir's friend and right-hand
- Aadhiya Prasath as Samad's sister
- Tinu Thomas Kannur as Aamir's friend
- Don Michael as Vivek Raghavan, Raghavan's younger son and Vinayakan's younger brother
- Vijayan Karanthoor as Samad's father
- Susheel Kumar as Seittuji's assistant and helper
- Afzal Anas as Aamir's friend

Cameo appearances

- Mohanlal as Mambarakkal Ahammed Ali alias "Baba", Aamir's grandfather and Younus Ali's father
- Tovino Thomas as Iver Alexander, Ahammed Ali's assassin
- Soubin Shahir as Victor Kennedy, Ahammed Ali's right-hand

== Production ==
=== Development ===
The film along with the title was officially announced in October 2022. However, the shooting was delayed due to Prithviraj's prior commitments to Vilayath Buddha and L2: Empuraan alongside Vysakh's other directorial venture Turbo. The project marked the reunion of Prithviraj and director Vysakh after 15 years, with their last collaboration being Vysakh's debut film Pokkiri Raja (2010). The film was officially launched in July 2025. In December 2025, it was confirmed that Mohanlal would make a cameo appearance. It was also revealed that the film is intended to be the first of a two-part film series, with the second part set to focus on Mohanlal's character, Mambarakkal Ahmed Ali, in a full-fledged role. Neil Nitin Mukesh made his Malayalam debut with the film.

=== Filming ===
Principal photography began in July 2025. The first schedule was filmed in London and was completed by August. The film was also shot in Dubai, Abu Dhabi and Nepal. On 13 January 2026, Mohanlal completed his portion of the shoot in Kochi. The filming was wrapped on 22 June 2026. Dubbing was completed by the end of July 2026.

== Soundtrack ==
Khalifa

Soundtrack album by Jakes Bejoy
- Released: 12 August 2026
- Studios: Mindscore Studio, Cochin; Mystic's Room, Chennai; MLounge, Cochin; AR Musicals, Bengaluru
- Genre: Feature film soundtrack
- Length: 33m 13s
- Language: Malayalam
- Label: Sony Music
- Producers: Jakes Bejoy; Joel Johns; Agastya Raag

Jakes Bejoy chronology
Thudakkam (2026)	Khalifa (2026)	I'm Game (2026)

The film's songs and background score were composed by Jakes Bejoy, thus marking his tenth collaboration with Prithviraj. The first single, "Asalayavale" sung by Sid Sriram and Mohammed Maqbool Mansoor, was released on 20 July 2026. The full album was released on 12 August 2026.

Track listing
No.	Title	Lyrics	Singer(s)	Length
1.	"Asalayavale"	Muthu	Sid Sriram, Mohammed Maqbool Mansoor	5:00
2.	"Mathara"	Muthu	Jakes Bejoy, Shreya Ghoshal, K.C. Balasarangan, Mohammed Maqbool Mansoor	4:12
3.	"Bhranthayal"	Unmesh Unnikrishnan	Jubair Salim, K. S. Harisankar	4:51
4.	"Kissayariyathe"	Rafeeq Ahamed	Anila Rajeev, K.C. Balasarangan	4:18
5.	"Salamathali"	Muthu	Akhil J. Chand, Mohammed Maqbool Mansoor	2:45
6.	"The Bloodline"	Mu.Ri	Jakes Bejoy, JOKER390P, chorus	2:23
7.	"Asalayavale (V2)"	Muthu	Hanan Shah, Fathima Jabbar, Mohammed Maqbool Mansoor	5:02
8.	"Gold Rush"	Mu.Ri	Dabzee, Double J the Rapper, JOKER390P, Chorus	3:45
9.	"Rise of Ali"	Mu.Ri	Joel James, JOKER390P, chorus	2:30
10.	"Periyavane"	Muthu	Vijay Yesudas, Sanjith Salam	4:57
Total length:				37:70

== Release ==
=== Theatrical ===
Khalifa was released worldwide on 20 August 2026 in Malayalam original alongside Tamil, Telugu and Hindi languages, coinciding with Onam weekend and clashing with the Malayalam film Bethlehem Kudumba Unit.

=== Home media ===
The Streaming rights of this movie were acquired by many platforms including Lionsgate Play, Amazon Prime Video, ManoramaMAX, Simply South, StarzPlay (outside MENA region), AP International South Cinema and Aha and it is released on 9 October 2026.

== Reception ==
=== Box office ===
The film grossed ₹5.35 crore in India on its opening day and ₹13.2 crore worldwide. Malayalam-speaking regions were the main source of revenue for this film; the Tamil and Telugu versions sold poorly. On its fourth day of release, the film grossed approximately ₹27.68 crore worldwide. The film's box office dropped sharply on its opening day, but remained relatively stable over the weekend, with Sunday's box office almost matching Saturday's. It was a box office bomb

=== Critical response ===
Khalifa received mixed to negative reviews from critics.

Anandu Suresh for The Indian Express rated the film 2/5, describing the film as a surface-level drama with shallow writing, although he praised the film's stunts and visuals.

S. R. Praveen for The Hindu called the film a shoddily written old-school smuggling drama which lacks the "intended emotional pull or the expected thrills".

Gayathri Kallukaran for the Eastern Eye praised the film's visuals, action choreography and background score, but described the film as "a predicable saga" which struggled to deliver a sense of surprise.

== Sequel ==
The second and final instalment of the two-part series was announced as Khalifa: The Legacy, starring Mohanlal in the lead role alongside Prithviraj, Soubin Shahir and Tovino Thomas, who are all reprising their roles from the first instalment. However, due to the lower-than-expected box office performance of Khalifa: The Ruler, the chances of a sequel are slim.
