= Manto (soundtrack) =

Soundtrack album by Sneha Khanwalkar and Raftaar
- Released: 9 September 2018
- Recorded: 2018
- Genre: Feature film soundtrack
- Length: 18:12
- Language: Hindi
- Label: Zee Music Company
External audio
- Official Audio Jukebox on YouTube

Sneha Khanwalkar chronology
Hanuman: Da' Damdaar (2017)	Manto (2018)	Ghoomketu (2020)

Raftaar chronology
Chaamp (2017)	Manto (2018)	Andhadhun (2018)

Singles from Manto
- 1. "Nagri Nagri" Released: 31 August 2018

Manto is the soundtrack album composed by Sneha Khanwalkar to the 2018 biographical drama film of the same name directed by Nandita Das based on the life of Pakistani playwright Saadat Hasan Manto, starring Nawazuddin Siddiqui as the titular playwright. The album featured five songs, with one based on Manto's poem written and composed by Raftaar; most of the songs were based on old poems written by Simaab Akbarabadi, Meeraji, Faiz Ahmed Faiz. One original song is written by Dibakar Banerjee along with Khanwalkar. The album was released through Zee Music Company on 9 September 2018.

== Development ==
The music for the film is composed by Sneha Khanwalkar, who considered it an interesting project musically. Since the film was set during the 1940s and 1950s, Das gave Khanwalkar a brief to compose melodies based on the poetry written during that time, and also spent time reading poetry with Das to understand the nuances of the composition.

Some of the older soundtracks, such as Lekin... (1991), served as influences for the film's musical landscape. To ensure the soundtrack's authenticity Das insisted Khanwalkar not to use electronic music. To achieve the sound of the older times, Das and Khanwalkar discussed about the pitch alterations while composing the tunes, while listening to the mixes and scratches.

Three poems – "Nagri Nagri" by Meeraji, "Bol Ke Lab Azaad Hain" by Faiz Ahmad Faiz and "Ab Kya Bataun" by Simaab Akbarabadi – were chosen for the film's lyrics. Khanwalkar weaved a contemporary approach into the songs, such as "Nagri Nagri", which had a simplicity derived from the lyrics but also a "quirky" and "interesting" beat underlined through it. Khanwalkar deliberately used an electronic beat to provide a cinematic feel. Das wanted to use as many Indian instruments as possible. For "Nagri Nagri", music producer Anjo John used an indigenous banjo, which had been sampled in order to get a "slightly dirty sound". Anubrato Ghatak played the violin in "Bol Ke Lab Azaad Hain" in a "raw" and "weeping" manner".

"Ab Kya Bataun" was considered a favorite song for Khanwalkar, which was picturized on Jaddanbai (Ila Arun). The song is performed by 70-year old singer Shubha Joshi. Khanwalkar went to her house in Borivali, where she discussed about recording that song and spent a whole day in her house, and recorded the song at the evening; she complimented Joshi's voice as "fantastic", able to sing classical songs beautifully. The song "Ban Titli" was composed a decade ago, for a shelved-Dibakar Banerjee directorial; Banerjee wrote parts of the songs, with additional verses by Khanwalkar. The song "Mantoiyat" is an additional rap number composed by Raftaar, based on poems written by Manto. Zakir Hussain composed the film's score.

== Release ==
The first song of the film titled as "Nagri Nagri" sung by Shankar Mahadevan was released 31 August 2018. The album was released by Zee Music Company on 9 September 2018.

== Reception ==
Vipin Nair of The Hindu reviewed that "With Manto, Khanwalkar ends her break with another whopper soundtrack that is totally in character with her largely offbeat repertoire", but concerned on the album's shorter length and not having more tracks from the poet's works. Maggie Lee of Variety called it a "full-bodied, mournful score by master composer Zakir Hussain" and Khanwalkar's songs "[boasted] lyrics that express the essence of Manto's beliefs". Shaheen Irani of Deccan Chronicle wrote "The music, even though it could have been avoided, are not much of a distraction."

Devansh Sharma of Firstpost wrote "Sneha Khanwalkar's ruminative music also serves as a window to Manto's mind, which harboured unmatched honesty that gleamed even amid all the vitriol." Sarath Ramesh Kuniyl of The Week called it a "haunting music". Bollywood Hungama-based critic wrote "Sneha Khanwalkar's music doesn't get much scope" while further adding "Zakir Hussain's background score is subtle and impactful".

== Track listing ==
No.	Title	Lyrics	Music	Singer(s)	Length
1.	"Ban Titli (Gratis)"	Dibakar Banerjee, Sneha Khanwalkar	Sneha Khanwalkar	Rekha Bhardwaj	2:18
2.	"Ab Kya Bataun"	Simaab Akbarabadi	Sneha Khanwalkar	Shubha Joshi	4:35
3.	"Nagri Nagri"	Meeraji	Sneha Khanwalkar	Shankar Mahadevan	3:27
4.	"Bol Ke Lab Azaad Hain"	Faiz Ahmed Faiz	Sneha Khanwalkar	Rashid Khan, Vidhya Shah	4:56
5.	"Mantoiyat"	Raftaar, Saadat Hasan Manto	Raftaar	Raftaar, Nawazuddin Siddiqui	2:56
Total length:					18:12

== Credits ==
Credits adapted from Zee Music Company:

- Music composers – Sneha Khanwalkar, Raftaar
- Music producers – Jeremy Fonseca, Zubin Balaporia, Anjo John, Raftaar
- Recording – Nigel Rajaratnam, Abhishek Gautam, Pawan Bhatia, Raftaar
- Mixing – Sneha Khanwalkar, Nigel Rajaratnam, Pritesh Panchal, Abhishek Ghatak
- Mastering – Sneha Khanwalkar, Nigel Rajaratnam, Shadab Rayeen, Abhishek Ghatak
- Backing vocals – Daniel B.George
- Harmonum – Bhavdeep Jaipurwale, Zoheb Khan
- Trumpet – Joseph Vessoaker
- Rhythm – Anand Bhagat, Raftaar
- Percussions – Anand Bhagat, Taufiq Qureshi, Raftaar
- Violin – Kamal Kamble, Anubrato Ghatak
- Viola and cello – Anubrato Ghatak
- Clarinet – Raj Sodha
- Tabla – Satyajit Talwalkar
- Mouth percussion – Taufiq Qureshi
- Bass – Randolph Correia
- Guitar – Tenzing Lama
