= Machas with Attitude =

Indian hip-hop trio (2008–2013)

Machas With Attitude
- Origin: Bangalore Karnataka, India; Chennai, Tamil Nadu, India
- Genres: Rap, hip hop, Trip hop
- Years active: 2008–2013
- Members: Nikhil Padmanabh (Bigg Nikk); Sumukh Mysore (Smokey); Vighnesh Shivanand (Brodha V)

Machas With Attitude (MWA) was a hip hop trio with members from Bangalore and Chennai, India. Formed on 14 June 2008, it consisted of Brodha V, Smokey and Bigg Nikk. MWA took influences from their various backgrounds, and although their songs were primarily in English, they usually featured lyrics in Hindi, Tamil, Telugu, Kannada and Malayalam. The group's name was inspired by the American hip-hop crew N.W.A.

== History ==
=== Formation ===
In early 2006, the three members – Bigg Nikk, Smokey and Brodha V met through an online battling community, before which, each artist was going solo.

They primarily performed in the premier pubs like the Kyra Theatre in Bangalore and did live stage performances in events like 'Mr and Miss Bangalore Times' on occasion of the semi-finals as well as the finals. They have performed in various College Events and Corporate Events, spreading the trend of hip hop music all over South India. They were still in the underground scene and continued to be until they got their first breakthrough single "Oh Eesa (Club Mix)" in the film Aayirathil Oruvan and later made their Bollywood debut with "Dheaon Dheaon" from Mujhse Fraaandship Karoge. Their devotion to the song is chronicled everywhere.

Machas With Attitude was later featured in the Namma Chennai Album, which also involved Bobo Shashi.

== Musical influences ==
The band, in many interviews cite Tupac Shakur, Eminem, A.R. Rahman, Rakim, Big L, Krs-One, Big Pun and Snoop Dogg as their biggest musical influences.

== Times Supastars ==
Machas With Attitude auditioned at the Times Music's Supastars, India's first ever pop band hunt, which is a large-scale entertainment variety show. The show presented India's best unknown talents. Machas With Attitude, which was the only hip hop band in a pop band hunt, made their appearances on national newspapers and widespread public media after winning the South leg of the competition, from among hundreds of applicants.

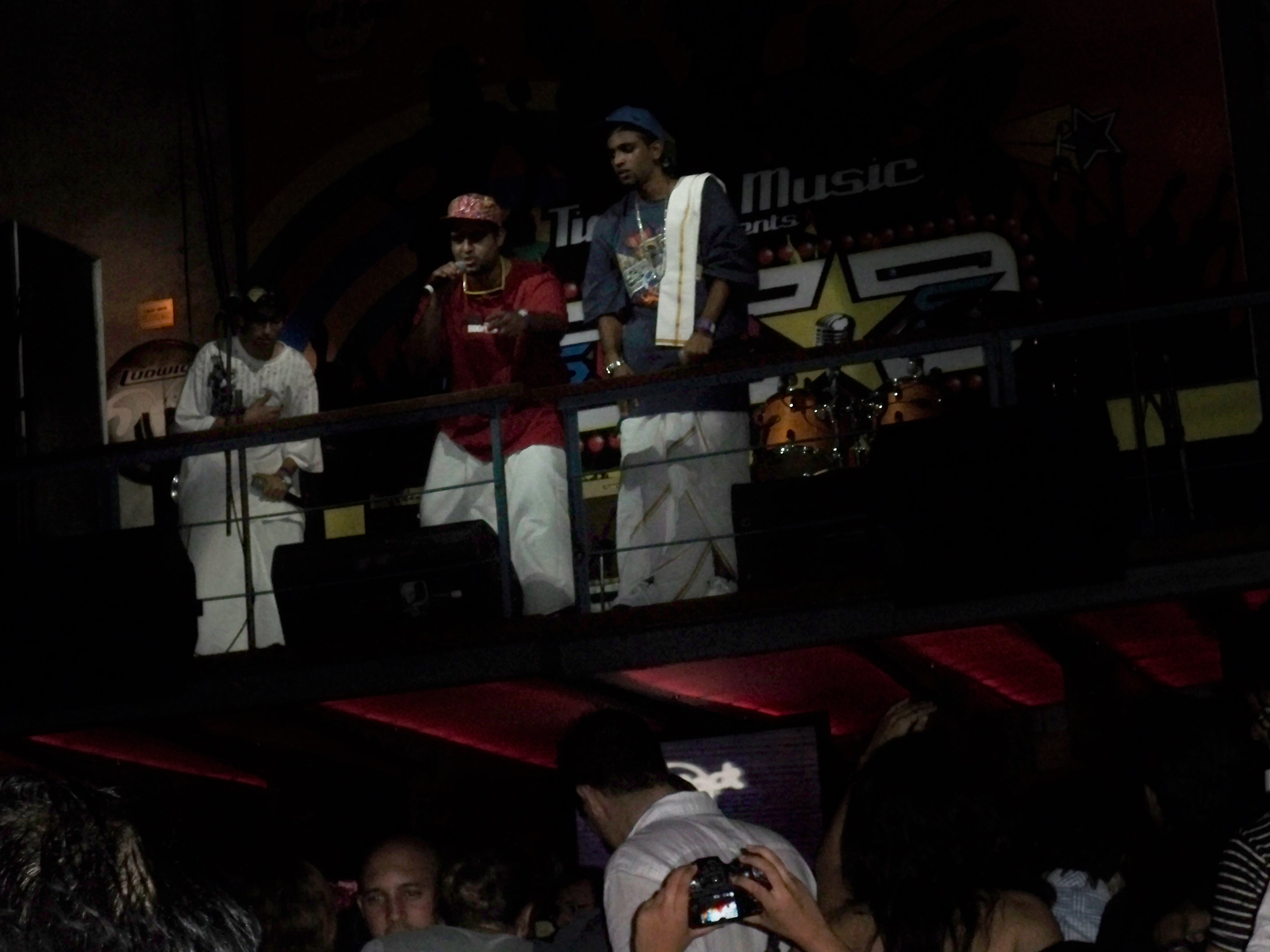
Machas With Attitude (MWA) Performing at Hard Rock Cafe, Mumbai

The finals, held at Hard Rock Café (HRC), Mumbai on 26 August 2010, was whipped up with frenzy performances by Bombay Rockers, Ali Quili and compeered by Siddharth Kannan. In the name of music world, Anu Malik, Shibani Kashyap, Leslee Lewis, DJ Suketu, DJ Ryan Beck, Ishq Bector and Raavi More were present. This platform was instrumental in introducing the Machas With Attitude to Bollywood.

== Professional career ==
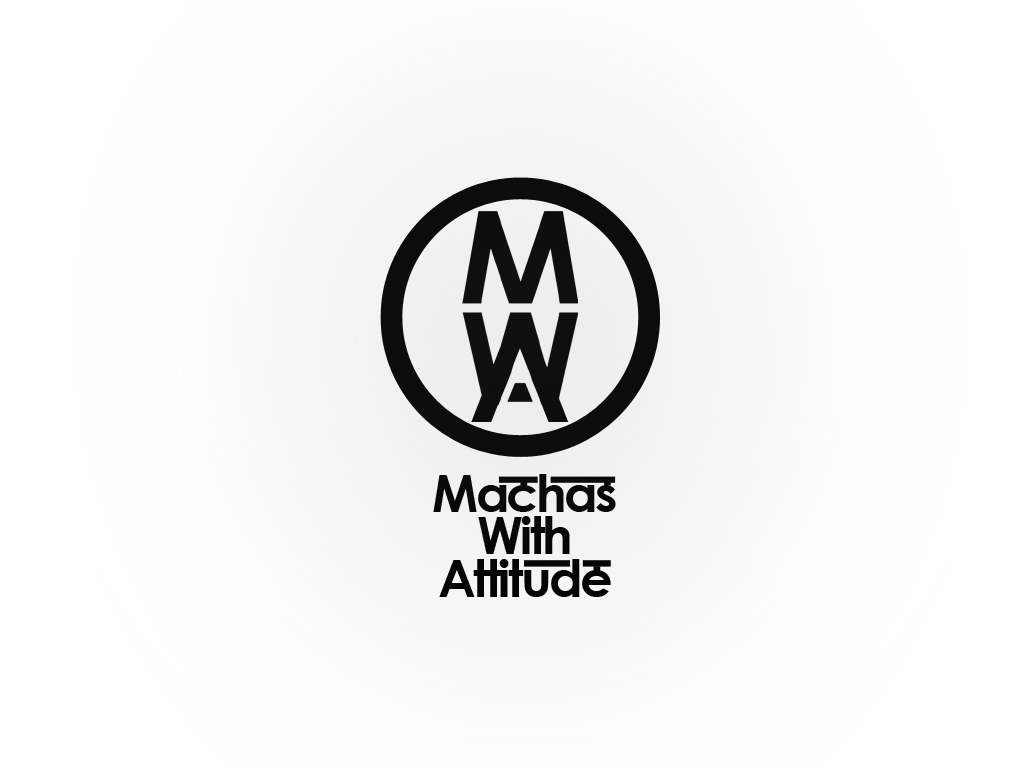
Machas With Attitude (MWA) Logo

Machas With Attitude took Hip-Hop to Bollywood with their debut track 'Dheaon Dheaon' from Mujhse Fraaandship Karoge, which was released on 14 October 2011, in which they featured alongside Vishal Dadlani of Vishal and Shekhar. Other achievements of the Machas With Attitude include various live stage performances and recordings for over a series of regional feature films.

Apart from this, they have collaborated with other hip hop artists like Ishq Bector and Haji Springer. In early 2012 M.W.A. performed alongside Gangis Khan, aka Camoflauge, who got signed to the Wu-Tang Clan. The Machas With Attitude are scheduled to go on floors with their debut album in late 2012.

On 28 July 2012 Machas With Attitude were featured on an hour-long interview with Radio One (India) 94.3 FM. They spoke about updates of the album and how they wrote their lyrics.

On 30 May 2013 Brodha V and Smokey won the Radiocity freedom award for "Best Hip Hop Artists" for the track "Indian Flava" which was presented by Vishal Dadlani. Upon hearing the song, Vishal offered them to sing for Chennai Express, for which they readily agreed. It was announced in the following days that Brodha V, Smokey and Enkore would be singing alongside Natalie Di Luccio for the track "Ready Steady Po". Ready Steady Po being the slogan of the film, gave primetime focus to M.W.A. 3 July 2013 marked their break through in the Bollywood industry with Vishal–Shekhar for the movie Chennai Express, which is a Shah Rukh Khan starrer. The song "Ready Steady Po" alongside Vishal Dadlani and Natalie Di Luccio received rave reviews as one of the best tracks in the film.

In 2012, writing for Zomba (a Sony Music initiative), actor Naren Weiss wrote a profile on Brodha V's life and career called The Brodha V Story.

== Discography ==
=== Film soundtracks ===
- 2013: Chennai Express – Ready Steady Po (Hindi)
- 2011: Mujhse Fraaandship Karoge (Hindi)
- 2012: Yen Endraal Kaadhal Enben (Tamil)
- 2011: Yuvan (Telugu/Tamil)
- 2011: Ragging (Telugu)
- 2011: Aadukalam (Tamil)
- 2011: Pilla Zamindar (Telugu)
- 2011: Maharaja (Tamil)
- 2011: Endhukante Premanta (Telugu)
- 2010: Aayirathil Oruvan(Tamil)
- 2010: Koffi Bar (Telugu/Kannada)
- 2010: Tamizh Padam (Tamil)
- 2010: Darling (Telugu)
- 2010: Kola Kolaya Mundhirika (Tamil)
- 2010: Pappi Apaccha (Malayalam)
- 2010: Irumbukkottai Murattu Singam (Tamil)
- 2010: Amara (Tamil)
- 2010: Drohi (Tamil)
- 2010: Asthamanam (Tamil)
- 2010: Veeravellait (Tamil)
- 2010: Nil Gavani Sellathey (Tamil)
- 2010: Velayadava (Tamil)
- 2009: Nimidangal (Tamil)
- 2009: Ninivugal (Tamil)
- 2009: Ananda Tandavam(Tamil)
- 2009: Kadhalagi (Tamil)
- 2009: Arjun gauru (Telugu)
- 2009: Yuagniki Okkadu (Telugu)
- 2009: Namma Chennai (English/Tamil)
- 2008: If you are in Emergency (English)
- 2008: Saidapet Merke (Tamil)

=== Studio albums ===
- 2014: Red + Green = Brown
- 2011: Death Punch
- 2011: Cellotape

=== Other appearances ===
- 2012: Dena Bank (Corporate)
- 2012: IBM (Corporate)
- 2012: Desi Hip-Hop Mixtape – Enkore (Making our Money)
- 2012: BITS PILANI RAP WARS (Main Judges)
- 2012: One Bengaluru One Music (Interview on Radio One 94.3)
- 2010: Chennai Sangamam (Tamil – Main Concert)

== Tracks ==
No.	Title	Writer(s)	Length
1.	"Ain't Nothing Like The Southside"	Bigg Nikk, Brodha V, Smokey	4:18
2.	"Making our Money"	Smokey, Brodha V
3.	"Indian Flava"	Bigg Nikk, Smokey, Brodha V, IshQ Bector, Haji Springer, Manmeet Kaur, Ko the Timeless, Ram K, Mandeep Sethi, Mo Boucher, Enkore	5:52
4.	"World's Fastest Indians"	Smokey, Bigg Nikk, Brodha V	3:49

== Television ==
Bigg Nikk of the Machas with Attitude hosted a show called Machas Mix which was aired on Captain TV. The essence of the programme was to have an informal interaction with the chosen musicians. The idea was to create an atmosphere where the invitee would be at ease. Some of the eminent invitees interviewed were D.Imman, Sanjay Chandrashaker and Hip Hop Tamizha.

The program, directed by Praveen Kumar and produced by Sam Anoton, was first aired in May 2010 and after completing 50 episodes, it went off air in October 2010. It was well received and obtained a decent TRP rating which made it the third most watched program on the channel.

Machas With Attitude was also featured on MTV Wassup in February 2009, regarding the issue of Moral Policing.
