= Main Wahi Hoon =

Single by Raftaar featuring Karma

Single by Raftaar and Karma
- English title: "The School Song"
- Genre: Desi hip hop
- Length: 3:46 (Music video); 2:50 (Audio)
- Songwriters: Raftaar; Karma
- Producer: Raftaar

Music video
- "Main Wahi Hoon on YouTube

"Main Wahi Hoon" (transl. I'm Still The Same) is a desi hip hop song by Raftaar, featuring Karma, released on 16 May 2019 by Zee Music Company. It is the 3rd track from Raftaar's sophomore album, Mr. Nair.

== Background ==
The lyrics are a nostalgic look at their school days.
