= Raftaar =

Indian rapper and singer (born 1988)

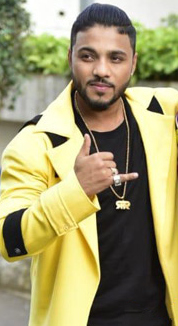
- Raftaar on the sets of Dance India Dance: Battle of the Champions
- Born: Kalathilkuzhiyil Devadasan Dilin Nair; 16 November 1988 (age 38); Trivandrum, Kerala, India
- Occupations: Rapper; Singer; Music Producer; Lyricist; Music Composer; Dancer; Actor; TV Personality
- Years active: 2008–present
- Spouses: Komal Vohra (m. 2016; div. 2022); Manraj Jawanda (m. 2025)
- Musical career
- Genres: R&B; Pop; Urban; Hip-Hop; Desi hip hop; Bollywood
- Labels: Sony Music India; Kalamkaar; Zee Music Company; Mass Appeal India
- Formerly of: Mafia Mundeer

Dilin Nair (Note: Although in a video Raftaar agrees that his full name is Kalathilkuzhiyil Devadasan Dilin Nair, his business filings list his name as Dilin Nair. The Wikipedia introduction uses only the legal name.) (born 16 November 1988), better known by his stage name Raftaar, is an Indian rapper, lyricist, music producer, composer, dancer and TV personality associated with Hindi, Punjabi and Haryanvi music.

== Early and personal life ==
Kalathilkuzhiyil Devadasan Dilin Nair was born on 16 November 1988 to a Delhi-based Malayali couple in Trivandrum (now Thiruvananthapuram), Kerala. Raftaar married Komal Vohra, the sister of Indian television actors Karan Vohra and Kunal Vohra, in December 2016. They filed for a divorce in 2020 and have been living separately. The legal proceedings were delayed due to the COVID-19 pandemic and were finalised on 6 October 2022.

On 31 January 2025, Raftaar married fashion stylist, actress, and model Manraj Jawanda in Thiruvananthapuram, Kerala in traditional Malayali and Sikh wedding ceremonies.

== Career ==
=== 2008-2012: Early career, Mafia Mundeer and Dance India Dance ===
Raftaar initially began his music career by making tracks with his childhood friends and fellow rappers Ikka and Lil Golu. After a while of making tracks and uploading them online, Yo Yo Honey Singh heard a track on Orkut which was uploaded by the trio, then known as The Black Wall Street Desis. Singh reached out to the three youngsters and invited them to his studio in Okhla, Delhi. According to Ikka on his track "Interview", Singh worked with the three youngsters while also giving them stage names; "Young Amli" for Ikka, "Raftaar" for Dilin who went by the name OniMaxxx/Max and "Lil Golu" for Sahil who had the nickname Golu. Some of his collaborations with Singh include "Kamli Kamli" featuring Rimz J and "Sharabia". Raftaar also started his career as a dancer, as Max and participated in a reality TV show Dance India Dance in 2011, in DID Doubles along with a friend named Manik.

In the meantime, Raftaar split from Mafia Mundeer due to credit-related problems, most notably involving the dispute related to the track "Dope Shope", from Singh's album, International Villager. He appeared in the music video for only a few seconds, alleging that his screen time was also cut.

=== 2012-2017: The Titans, Swag Mera Desi and mainstream break-out ===
After the split, he then formed a group, The Titans, with Badshah and Sachit Takkar (Sachh). They produced many songs together in the Punjabi music industry and Bollywood together, most notably for Deep Money's album Born Star, on tracks like "Bottle", "Majnu" and "Sugar".

Raftaar became widely known and recognised after releasing his song "Swag Mera Desi" in 2013 with Manj Musik. The line "Ab yeh karke dikhao" (transl. Now try to do this) from the song was interpreted as a subliminal directed towards Yo Yo Honey Singh, who used the phrase in his song "Party With The Bhoothnath" which led to a dispute between the two rappers in media. "Swag Mera Desi" won Best Urban Song at the Brit Asia TV Music Awards in 2014. Further, Raftaar and Singh were also embroiled in a credit dispute, stemming from their collaboration on the soundtrack of the film Fugly, when Raftaar alleged that he wasn't credited as a songwriter on three tracks from the album.

Raftaar collaborated with Manj Musik again, for the posse cut "Desi Hip Hop", which also featured Badshah, Humble the Poet, Roach Killa, Raxstar, Sarb Smooth and Big Dhillon. The track also featured subliminal disses aimed at Yo Yo Honey Singh. The same year, he skyrocketed to mainstream popularity with the songs, "All Black", with Sukhe and Jaani, and "Toh Dishoom" and "Dhaakad" from the 2016 films Dishoom and Dangal, respectively.

=== 2017-2020: KALAMKAAR, debut album and collaborations ===
In 2017, Raftaar debuted in the Bengali music industry through the film One which featured singer Vishal Dadlani and Raftaar. In the same year, he founded the record label KALAMKAAR, alongside Ankit Khanna, signing a variety of acts, such as Krsna, Rashmeet Kaur, Deep Kalsi, Karma, Yunan and Harjas Harjaai. He also produced and rapped a song for the Chaamp soundtrack. He released his debut album, Zero To Infinity, the following year in May. The album spawned the single, "Baby Marvaake Maanegi", accompanied by a music video featuring Nora Fatehi.

In September 2018, Raftaar appeared on a podcast with Raaj Jones, where he questioned if fellow rapper Emiway Bantai was generating enough revenue from hip-hop. The statement was taken out of context and resulted in Emiway dropping "Samajh Mein Aaya Kya", targeting Raftaar and refuting his claims that Emiway wasn’t earning much yet, and further added that he eventually would build an empire of his own. Raftaar responded with his own track, "Sheikh Chilli", where he called out Emiway for taking the statement out of context and dissected his false claims. Emiway responded again with "Giraftaar", which prompted Raftaar to respond with the song "Anime Hentai" (now known as Awein Hai). This paved the way for a wave of commercialisation in the Indian hip-hop genre, as many Indian rappers claimed to have benefited from the publicity from a credit standpoint. It also gave rise to many other publicised beefs taking place.

Meanwhile, Raftaar released the track "Mantoiyat" from the soundtrack of the film Manto, which was acclaimed for its lyrical content, while incorporating conscious hip-hop in Hindi film music. Raftaar collaborated with Bollywood actor Varun Dhawan for the second edition of Breezer Vivid Shuffle in 2019, and in the same year, started judging the reality shows MTV Hustle, Dance India Dance and MTV Roadies. The next year, he released his second album, Mr. Nair, through Zee Music Company, featuring his labelmates Krsna, Rashmeet Kaur, Deep Kalsi, Karma, Yunan, and Harjas Harjaayi among others.

=== 2020-present: Further collaborations and HARD DRIVE Vol.1 & Vol.2 ===
In 2021, he released his collaboration with labelmate Rashmeet Kaur, "Ghana Kasoota", with the music video featuring Surbhi Jyoti. Over the next few years, Raftaar continued to collaborate with various upcoming desi hip-hop artists like Shah Rule, MC Stan, Seedhe Maut, King, Chaar Diwaari, on singles and also, on a collaborative EP with Prabh Deep, titled Praa, in addition to releasing his own projects, most notably the Hard Drive Vol. 1, and its sequel, in 2022 and 2024, respectively.

Raftaar made his acting debut in the JioCinema web-series Bajao in 2023.

He was seen as a guest judge on the show India's Got Latent in 2024 and returned to judge the fourth season of MTV Hustle, after being absent from the previous two seasons. In 2025, he participated in the reality show The Traitors as a contestant, until he was eliminated in the sixth episode.

In 2026, alongside Krsna, he announced his own reality show focusing on hip-hop, titled Legacy, produced by SVF Entertainment, which started airing on YouTube and further partnered with ZEE5 as well for streaming rights.

== Discography ==
=== Albums ===
- Zero To Infinity (2018)
- Mr. Nair (2020)

Year	Album	Track	Artist(s)	Producer(s)
2018	Zero to Infinity	Baby Marvake Maanegi	Raftaar	Blackout
2018	Zero to Infinity	Saare Karo Dab	Raftaar, Sonu Kakkar & Muhfaad	Raftaar
2018	Zero to Infinity	Gaddi	Raftaar & Deep Kalsi	Deep Kalsi
2018	Zero to Infinity	Gall Goriye	Raftaar & Maninder Buttar	Raftaar
2018	Zero to Infinity	Jean Teri	Raftaar, Jaz Dhami & Deep Kalsi	Deep Kalsi
2018	Zero to Infinity	Lonely	Raftaar, Mehabin	Raftaar
2018	Zero to Infinity	Mundeya Di Mautt	Raftaar & Yunan	Raftaar
2018	Zero to Infinity	Woh Chori	Raftaar & Jyotica Tangri	Raftaar
2020	Mr. Nair	Me And My Pen	Raftaar ft. Shah Rule	Raftaar & Shah Rule
2020	Mr. Nair	Dilli Waali Baatcheet	Raftaar	Raftaar
2020	Mr. Nair	Main Wahi Hoon	Raftaar ft. Karma	Raftaar
2020	Mr. Nair	Damn	Raftaar ft. Krsna	Raftaar
2020	Mr. Nair	Sick	Raftaar ft. Yunan	Mehabin & Raftaar
2020	Mr. Nair	Drama	Raftaar	Tom Enzy & Raftaar
2020	Mr. Nair	Beshaq	Raftaar ft. Yunan	AAKASH, Yunan & Raftaar
2020	Mr. Nair	Feeling You	Raftaar ft. Deep Kalsi	AAKASH & Raftaar
2020	Mr. Nair	Haan	Raftaar ft. Harjas Harjaayi & Rashmeet Kaur	Saurabh Lokhande & Raftaar
2020	Mr. Nair	Move	Raftaar	Saurabh Lokhande
2020	Mr. Nair	Bottal Wargi	Raftaar ft. Jordan Sandhu	Deep Kalsi
2020	Mr. Nair	Naachne Ka Shaunq	Raftaar ft. Brodha V	Tom Enzy
2020	Mr. Nair	Superman	Raftaar ft. Manj Musik	INSTINE, Raftaar & Manj Musik
2020	Mr. Nair	Popular	Raftaar	AAKASH & Raftaar
2020	Mr. Nair	Down	Raftaar ft. Krsna	Lavito Beats, Tom Enzy & Raftaar
2020	Mr. Nair	Proud	Raftaar	Tom Enzy & Raftaar

=== EPs and Mixtapes ===
- WTF (Witness The Future) Mixtape: Vol. 1 (2013–14)
- BAR'ISH (EP) (2020–21) (unreleased)
- Hard Drive Vol.1 (EP) (2022)
- Praa (EP) (2023)
- Hard Drive Vol. 2 (EP) (2024)

Year	EP	Track	Artist(s)	Producer(s)
2020-21	BAR'ISH EP	Microphone Check	Raftaar	SCARY'P
2020-21	BAR'ISH EP	Tu Phir Se Aana	Raftaar ft. Salim Merchant & Karma	Raftaar, Salim Merchant & Saurabh Lokhande
2020-21	BAR'ISH EP	Black Sheep	Raftaar	Boger
2020-21	BAR'ISH EP	Goat Dekho	Raftaar	Allrounda Beats
2022	Hard Drive Vol. 1	ICE	Raftaar	DXOR
2022	Hard Drive Vol. 1	F16	Raftaar ft. Sikander Kahlon	Harm Sandhu
2022	Hard Drive Vol. 1	GANGNUM	Raftaar ft. Deep Kalsi	Raftaar
2022	Hard Drive Vol. 1	NO CHINA	Raftaar ft. Krsna	Raftaar & Frisk
2022	Hard Drive Vol. 1	36	Raftaar ft. Karma	Track PROS
2022	Hard Drive Vol. 1	RAASHAH	Raftaar ft. Badshah	YoungWilly
2022	Hard Drive Vol. 1	JASHAN-E-HIP-HOP	Raftaar ft. Faris Shafi	Umair
2023	Praa	ABBU	Raftaar & Prabh Deep	Tonybasu
2023	Praa	BADNAAM	Raftaar & Prabh Deep	Lambo Drive
2023	Praa	HELLO	Raftaar & Prabh Deep	Anywaywell
2023	Praa	TRAP PRAA	Raftaar & Prabh Deep	Umair
2024	Hard Drive Vol. 2	MERA PARICHAY	Raftaar ft. Sikander Kahlon	MUSAGOTMOTION, Instine
2024	Hard Drive Vol. 2	DEHSHAT HO	Raftaar ft. Yashraj	Lonely Boy, LODONI, Phenom
2024	Hard Drive Vol. 2	RAP-TA	Raftaar	Phenom
2024	Hard Drive Vol. 2	REAL SHIT	Raftaar	Sez on the Baet
2024	Hard Drive Vol. 2	MUNDE HOOD DE	Raftaar ft. Karma	Raftaar
2024	Hard Drive Vol. 2	BAAWE	Raftaar ft. Badshah	Hiten
2024	Hard Drive Vol. 2	ADVICE	Raftaar ft. Deep Kalsi	DRJ Sohail
2024	Hard Drive Vol. 2	BANJO BOUNCE	Raftaar ft. EPR Iyer	DreddAf
2024	Hard Drive Vol. 2	ME AND MY BROSKI	Raftaar ft. Ikka	Sez on the Beat

=== Singles and collaborations ===
Year	Track	Artist(s)	Producer(s)	Note(s)
2009	Sharaabia	Preet Harpal, Raftaar, Yo Yo Honey Singh	Honey Singh	From the album The Lock Up by Preet Harpal
2009	Gadbad	Raftaar, Ikka, Lil Golu, Yo Yo Honey Singh	Honey Singh	Mafia Mundeer Records
2010	Kamli Kamli	Rimz J ft. Raftaar, Yo Yo Honey Singh	Honey Singh	From the album The Rising Queen by Rimz J
2010	Sadko Pe Khaali Peeli Firta Mai	Raftaar, Yo Yo Honey Singh	Honey Singh	Mafia Mundeer Records
2010	Condom	Raftaar, Yo Yo Honey Singh, Ikka, Lil Golu	Honey Singh	Mafia Mundeer Records
2012	Bottle	Deep Money ft. Raftaar	The Titans	From the album Born Star by Deep Money
2012	Majnu	Deep Money ft. Raftaar	The Titans	From the album Born Star by Deep Money
2012	Tere Pichchhe	Deep Money ft. Raftaar	The Titans	From the album Born Star by Deep Money
2012	Sugar	Deep Money ft. Raftaar	The Titans	From the album Born Star by Deep Money
2013	You Don't Know Me	Raftaar	Raftaar	From WTF Mixtape: Vol 1
2013	Thappad	Raftaar	Samples "Send It Up" by Kanye West	From WTF Mixtape: Vol 1
2014	Swag Mera Desi	Raftaar & Manj Musik	Manj Musik	Panasonic Mobile MTV Spoken Word
2014	Happy Single	B.I.G Dhillon & Raftaar	Raftaar	
2014	Sniper	Sukh-E & Raftaar	Sukh-E	
2014	FU (For You)	Raftaar	Samples 8 Mile (Bootleg) by Eminem	From WTF Mixtape: Vol 1
2014	BBM	Nindy Kaur & Raftaar	Three Records RDB (Rhythm Dhol Bass)	
2014	Gal Mitro	Nindy Kaur & Raftaar	Three Records RDB (Rhythm Dhol Bass)	
2015	All Black	Mehabin and Raftaar	Sukh-E and Raftaar	
2015	Desi Hip Hop	Manj Musik, Raxstar, Roach Killa, Humble the Poet, Badshah, BIG Dhillon, Sarb Smooth & Raftaar	Manj Musik	Panasonic Mobile MTV Spoken Word
2015	Stand Up	Manj Musik, Big Dhillon & Raftaar	Manj Musik, O2 & SRK	Panasonic Mobile MTV Spoken Word
2015	Mombatiye	Zohaib Amjad, Raftaar & Manj Musik	Manj Musik	
2015	Allah Veh	Manj Musik, Raftaar & Jashan Singh	Manj Musik & Sunny Brown	From the fourth season of Coke Studio India
2015	Billo Hai	Sahara, Manj Musik & Raftaar	Manj Musik	
2016	Nazar Battu Anthem	Nazar Battu, Abhi Payla & Raftaar	D Chandu	
2016	Chandigarh Rehn Waaliye	Jenny Johal, Raftaar & Bunty Bains	Desi Crew	
2016	TVF's CUTE Vol. 1	Raftaar	Raftaar	Promotional track for Vodafone, a remix of the infamous "Ch**t Vol.1"
2016	Lak Hilaade	Manj Musik, Amy Jackson & Raftaar	Manj Musik, O2 & SRK	
2016	Do Hazaar Solo	Raftaar	Raftaar	Introduction track for the album Zero To Infinity
2016	Saroor	Resham Singh Anmol & Raftaar	Desi Crew	
2016	Instagram Love	Raftaar ft. Kappie	Raftaar	Promotional track for Vodafone
2017	Mera Highway Star	Tulsi Kumar & Raftaar	Sanjay Rajee	
2017	Can't Stop The Party	Noopsta, Raftaar & Humble The Poet	Manj Musik	
2017	Baby Marvake Maanegi	Raftaar	Blackout	
2017	Tere Wargi Nai Ae	Raftaar	Raftaar	
2017	#SADAK	Emiway Bantai ft. Raftaar	PSYIK	
	Shuffle Track 2.0 (Live Life in Color)	Raftaar ft. Fejo		Promotional track for Breezer Vivid Shuffle
2018	Sheikh Chilli	Raftaar	Raftaar & Instine	Diss tracks aimed at Emiway Bantai
2018	Awein Hai (previously titled Anime Hentai)	Raftaar	Frisk	Diss tracks aimed at Emiway Bantai
2018	Ready For My Vyah (Shaadi Anthem)	Deep Kalsi, Akriti Kakar & Raftaar	Deep Kalsi	
2019	Khainch Le Quashh	Raftaar & Shivi	Arkane	
2020	Aage Chal	Raftaar	Saurabh Lokhande	
2020	Thoda	Rahul Sathu & Raftaar	Rahul Sathu	
2020	Naiyyo	Akasa Singh and Raftaar	Stego & Vinay Vyas	
2020	Saath Ya Khilaaf	Krsna ft. Raftaar	Tay On The Track	
2020	Mask On	Raftaar ft. Karma, Rashmeet Kaur & Yunan	GMP Sound Raftaar& Mehabin	
2020	Angaar	Ikka ft. Raftaar	Sez on the Beat	From the album I by Ikka
2020	Tu Phir Se Aana	Raftaar ft. Salim Merchant & Karma	Raftaar	
2020	Click Pow Get Down	Raftaar		Promotional track for Epic Games
2021	Saza-E-Maut	Krsna ft. Raftaar	Rill Beats & Young Grape Beatz	From the album Still Here by Krsna
2021	Ghana Kasoota	Raftaar & Rashmeet Kaur ft. Surbhi Jyoti	Avvy Sra	
2021	Barbaad	Raftaar and Afsana Khan	Salim–Sulaiman	From Bhoomi 2021 by Salim-Sulaiman
2021	Say My Name	Smokey the Ghost ft. Raftaar & Sikander Kahlon	Kdllac	From the album The Human Nation by Smokey the Ghost
2022	RATATA	Raftaar	Artem grigoryan	Promotional track for PUBG: New State Mobile
2022	Load Hai	Raftaar ft. Yunan	Hiten	Sony Music Company
2022	How to Hate	MC STΔN ft. Raftaar	MC STΔN	From the album Insaan by MC STΔN
2022	Nahi Hai Woh	Shah Rule ft. MC Altaf & Raftaar	Stunnah Beatz	
2022	IMAGE	Deep Kalsi ft. Raftaar	Mehabin	From the EP WINNERSCIRCLE by Deep Kalsi
2022	Kaali Car	Raftaar & Asees Kaur	Mehabin	
2022	Shringaar	Vayu, Aastha Gill & Akasa Singh ft. Raftaar	Vaibhav Pani	
2022	Top Off	Ikka ft. Raftaar & Mehabin	Byg Byrd	From the album Nishu by Ikka
2022	Speed Se Badho	Raftaar	Raftaar	
2022	Never Back Down	Raftaar	Kofeina	
2023	Tajurba	Prabh Deep ft. Raftaar	Lambo Drive	From the album Bhram (Deluxe) by Prabh Deep
2023	Teray Naam	Hasan Raheem ft. Raftaar	Shahrukh	From the EP Maybe, It’s Love by Hasan Raheem
2023	Phone Mila Ke	Raftaar & Akasa Singh	Mehabin & Saurabh Lokhande	
2023	Bigg Boss OTT 2 - Official Anthem	Raftaar	JioCinema, Endemol Shine India	Promotional track for Bigg Boss OTT 2
2023	Legacy	Raftaar	KSHMR	From the album KARAM by KSHMR
2023	No Mercy	Raftaar feat. Krsna, Karma, Mehabin	Deep Kalsi	From the album Tunnel Vision by Deep Kalsi
2023	Woh Ratt	Raftaar ft. Krsna	lejJA	Released on Raftaar's birthday
2024	Like a Snake	Badshah ft. Raftaar, Aastha Gill	Hiten	From the album Ek Tha Raja by Badshah
2024	Morni	Raftaar & Sukh-E ft Bhumika Sharma	Mehabin	Accompanied by a music video featuring Moroccan model Soundous Moufakir
2024	WARCRY	King, Raftaar	Riz Shain	From the album Monopoly Moves by King
2024	Karta Kya Hai	Karma, Raftaar	Bharg	From the EP How Much a Rhyme Costs by Karma
2024	MTV Hustle Season 4 - Official Anthem	Raftaar, Ikka	Aditya Pushkarna	Promotional track for the fourth season of MTV Hustle
2024	Gourmet Shit!	Raftaar, Seedhe Maut	Calm	From the EP Kshama by Seedhe Maut
2025	Farebi	Raftaar, Chaar Diwaari	Chaar Diwaari	
2025	Buss Down	KRSNA, Raftaar	Sana, M61	From the mixtape Yours Truly by Krsna

=== Film music ===
Year	Film / Series	Track	Co-singer(s)	Composer(s)	Lyricist(s)	Note(s)
2013	Bullet Raja	Tamanchey Pe Disco	Nindy Kaur, Manj Musik, RDB	RDB, Manj Musik	Raftaar	Hindi film
2014	Heropanti	Whistle Baja	Manj Musik, Nindy Kaur	Manj Musik, Laxmikant–Pyarelal	Raftaar	Hindi film
2014	Heropanti	The Puppy Song	Manj Musik	Manj Musik	Raftaar	Hindi film
2014	Fugly	Dhup Chik	Badshah, Aastha Gill	Raftaar	Raftaar	Hindi film
2014	Dr. Cabbie	Dal Makhni	Manj Musik	Manj Musik	Manj Musik, Raftaar	Hindi film
2015	Gabbar Is Back	Warna Gabbar Aa Jayega	Manj Musik	Manj Musik	Manj Musik, Raftaar, Big Dhillon	Hindi film
2015	Singh Is Bliing	Singh and Kaur	Manj Musik, Nindy Kaur	Manj Musik	Manj Musik, Nindy Kaur, Raftaar, Big Dhillon	Hindi film
2016	Baaghi	Let's Talk About Love	Neha Kakkar	Manj Musik	Raftaar, Shabbir Khan	Hindi film
2016	A Flying Jatt	A Flying Jatt Title Track	Mansheel Gujral, Tanishkaa	Sachin–Jigar	Vayu, Raftaar	Hindi film
2016	Dishoom	Toh Dishoom	Shahid Mallya	Pritam	Mayur Puri	Hindi film
2016	Dangal	Dhaakad	—	Pritam	Amitabh Bhattacharya	Hindi film
2016	Beiimaan Love	Mar Gaye	Manj Musik, Nindy Kaur	Manj Musik	Raftaar	Hindi film
2016	Tum Bin II	Ki Kariye Nachna Aaonda Nahin	Hardy Sandhu, Neha Kakkar	Gourov-Roshin	Kumaar	Hindi film
2017	One	One Title Track	Vishal Dadlani	Arindam Chatterjee	Prosen	Bengali film
2017	Chaamp	Dekho Dekho Chaamp	—	Raftaar		Bengali film
2017	Kaabil	Haseeno Ka Deewana (Remake)	Payal Dev	Gourov-Roshin, Rajesh Roshan	Kumaar, Anjaan	Hindi film
2017	Commando 2	Hare Krishna Hare Ram (Remake)	Armaan Malik, Ritika	Gourov-Roshin, Pritam	Kumaar	Hindi film
2017	Jolly LLB 2	Go Pagal	Nindy Kaur	Manj Musik	Manj Musik, Raftaar	Hindi film
2017	Raabta	Sadda Move	Diljit Dosanjh, Pradeep Singh Sran	Pritam	Amitabh Bhattacharya, Irshad Kamil	Hindi film
2017	Behen Hogi Teri	Jaanu (Remake)	Juggy D, Shivi	Rishi Rich, R. D. Burman	Anand Bakshi, Raftaar	Hindi film
2017	A Gentleman	Bandook Meri Laila	Ash King, Sachin–Jigar, Sidharth Malhotra	Sachin–Jigar	Vayu	Hindi film
2017	The Final Exit	Dum Maro Dum Maro	Neha Kakkar, Yasser Desai	Amjad-Nadeem	Amjad-Nadeem, Raftaar	Hindi film
2017	Lucknow Central	Teen Kabootar	Mohit Chauhan, Divya Kumar	Arjunna Harjaie	Kumaar, Raftaar	Hindi film
2017	Fukrey Returns	Mehbooba (Remake)	Neha Kakkar, Yasser Desai, Mohammed Rafi	Prem-Hardeep	Kumaar	Hindi film
2017	Fukrey Returns	Tu Mera Bhai Nahi Hai	Gandharv Sachdev	Sumeet-Bellary	Satya Khare, Raftaar	Hindi film
2017	Tiger Zinda Hai	Zinda Hai	Sukhwinder Singh	Vishal–Shekhar, Julius Packiam	Irshad Kamil	Hindi film
2018	Manto	Mantoiyat	Nawazuddin Siddiqui	Raftaar	Raftaar, Saadat Hasan Manto	Hindi film
2018	Andhadhun	Andhadhun Title Track	—	Raftaar, Girish Nakod		Hindi film
2018	Bhaiaji Superhit	Naam Hai Bhaiaji	Amit Mishra	Sanjeev–Darshan, Neerraj Pathak	Sanjeev Chaturvedi, Neerraj Pathak	Hindi film
2018	Bhaiaji Superhit	Om Namah Shivay	Sukhwinder Singh, Raghav Sachar, Akanksha Sharma	Raghav Sachar	Shabbir Ahmed	Hindi film
2019	Setters	Kartootein	Salim–Sulaiman, Sukhwinder SIngh			Hindi film
2020	Darbar	Thalaiva In Charge	Yogi B	Anirudh Ravichander	Raftaar, Yogi B, Senthuzhan, Syan	Hindi film
2020	Love Aaj Kal	Parmeshwara	—	Pritam	Irshad Kamil	Hindi film
2021	99 Songs	Nayi Nayi	Shashwat Singh	A. R. Rahman	Navneet Virk, Raftaar	Hindi film
2021	Pagglait	Pagglait	Amrita Singh, Arijit Singh	Arijit Singh	Neelesh Misra	Hindi film
2021	Sherni	Main Sherni	Akasa Singh	Utkarsh Ghatekar	Raghav	Hindi film
2022	The Great Indian Murder	Raskala	—	Umang Doshi	Shloke Lal, Ashwath Bobo	Hindi film
2022	Janhit Mein Jaari	Janhit Mein Jaari Title Track	Nakash Aziz	Prini Sidhant Madhav	Raaj Shaandilyaa	Hindi film
2022	Vikram (D)	Badle Badle (Rap Extended Version)	Kamal Haasan	Anirudh Ravichander	Anirudh Ravichander, Raqueeb Alam	Hindi film
2023	Kisi Ka Bhai Kisi Ki Jaan	Yentamma	Vishal Dadlani, Payal Dev	Payal Dev	Shabbir Ahmed	Hindi film
2023	12th Fail	"Restart" (Rap)	—	Shantanu Moitra	Swanand Kirkire, Raftaar	Hindi film
2023	12th Fail	"Restart" (Rap 'N' Folk)	Swanand Kirkire, Shaan, Vidhu Vinod Chopra, Shantanu Moitra	Shantanu Moitra	Swanand Kirkire, Raftaar	Hindi film
2024	Shaitaan	"Aisa Main Shaitaan"	—	Amit Trivedi	Kumaar	Hindi film

== Filmography ==
Year	Show	Channel	Role	Note(s)
2011	Dance India Dance Doubles	Zee TV	Contestant	
2015	Jhalak Dikhhla Jaa Reloaded	Colors TV	Contestant	9th place
2018	Lockdown	ZEE5	Contestant	
2018	Roadies Xtreme	MTV	Gang Leader	
2018	Bhabiji Ghar Par Hain!	&TV	Himself	Guest
2019	Roadies: Real Heroes	MTV	Gang Leader	Winner
2019	Dance India Dance: Battle of the Champions	Zee TV	Judge	
2019 2025	MTV Hustle	MTV, JioCinema	Judge	Major role in development of the show, was seen on the panel in the first season and fourth season
2020	Roadies: Revolution	MTV	Gang Leader	Replaced by Varun Sood as Raftaar had to leave the show midway for release of his album Mr. Nair.
2023	Bajao	JioCinema	Babbar	
2024	India's Got Latent	YouTube	Guest Judge	Was seen in the first episode and a later unreleased episode
2025	The Traitors	Prime Video	Contestant	13th place
2026	Legacy	YouTube	Judge	
