= Jordindian =

Indian sketch comedy YouTube channel

- Other names: "Naser" and "Beep"
- Occupations: Actor; comedian; singer

YouTube information
- Channel: Jordindian
- Years active: 2016–present
- Genre: Sketch comedy
- Subscribers: 3.09 million
- Views: 1.03 billion
- Last updated: September 26, 2026

Jordindian is an Indian sketch comedy and music YouTube channel created by Naser Al Azzeh and Vineeth "Beep" Kumar. The name "Jordindian" is based on the origins of the two creators: Naser is from Jordan, while Vineeth is from India.

In 2018, the duo released the music video ′Smoke Shisha Play FIFA', which is their most popular video with over 20 million views. Although they have released four subsequent music videos, they have primarily focused on producing comedy sketches which are typically based on youth culture in India or highlighting the differences between their respective cultures. They focus on South Indian culture.

== Creators ==
Naser Al Azzeh is a Jordanian-Indian national who was brought up in India. His father is a Jordanian who studied at MS Ramaiah Institute of Technology where he met his Indian mother. He grew up in Bangalore around Lingarajapuram and Cox Town. He is a freelance filmmaker, dancer, and founder of Black Ice Crew, an Indian dance group.

Vineeth "Beep" Kumar is a comedian, TV host, emcee and beat-boxer and an actor prominently working in Kannada cinema. He has interviewed Salman Khan, A. R. Rahman, Shah Rukh Khan, Sonu Sood, Boman Irani, and Mika Singh, among others.

In an interview with Jaby Koay and Achara Kirk in May 2020, Naser and Vineeth described meeting at college in India in 2007. They bonded over their love of Russell Peters, and their friendship developed when they realised they lived in the same neighbourhood. The channel Jordindian was founded in 2016 and their first video was uploaded on 12 January 2017.

They were featured in YouTube Rewind 2018.

== Discography ==
Year	Title	Cast	Additional Cast	Music Production	Recording Studio	Note	References
2018	Smoke Shisha Play Fifa	Naser Al Azzeh, Vineeth Beep Kumar		Bharath M Devaraj "MD"	Mark My Words. Inc		
2019	Fasting and Furious	Naser Al Azzeh, Vineeth Beep Kumar		Bharath M Devaraj "MD"	Mark My Words. Inc		
2019	Vainko	Naser Al Azzeh, Vineeth Beep Kumar	Brodha V, Aishwarya Suresh, Nirmal Khona		Cadence Studio	Collaborative Work with Brodha V	
2020	Exam Time	Naser Al Azzeh, Vineeth Beep Kumar	Praveen Raj Devasagayam, Aron Carl Sapru, Taron Carl Sapru, Aishwarya Suresh, Sal Yusuf, Anuj SM, Bharath M Devraj, Neelam Issac, Sunilino Matthew, Sujith Vasudevan, Arundathi Somaiah, Boris Kenneth, Rejin Chamandy	Bharath M Devaraj "MD"	Mark My Words. Inc	Collaborative work with Netflix India	
2020	Locked Up In The Lockdown	Naser Al Azzeh, Vineeth Beep Kumar		Bharath M Devaraj "MD"	Mark My Words. Inc		
2020	Eat Sleep Binge Repeat	Naser Al Azzeh, Vineeth Beep Kumar	Srilakshmi, Varsha Amarnath, Benson Diengdoh, Peter Pious	Bharath M Devaraj "MD"	Mark My Words. Inc		
