= Anik Khan =

American rapper

Anik Khan আনিক খান
- Born: Anik Khan; January 13, 1989 (age 37); Dhaka, Bangladesh
- Origin: Queens, New York, U.S.
- Genres: Hip hop; World
- Occupations: Rapper; Singer; Songwriter; Producer
- Instrument: Vocals
- Years active: 2015–present
- Labels: AVX; The Foreign Affair; Artist Originals
- Website: anikkhanmusic.com

Anik Khan is a Bangladeshi-American rapper and singer-songwriter based in New York City.

== Early life ==
Khan was born in Dhaka, Bangladesh and raised in Astoria, Queens, New York. His father was involved in politics and fought in the Bangladesh Liberation War. In 1993, when Khan was four, his father moved their family to the United States.

Khan moved to Leesburg, Virginia with his family in his early in high school and began spending his time making beats on FL Studio. Khan described going through an identity crisis during this time, saying "I kinda didn't know who I was, I was like away from my culture". Khan later attended Full Sail University in Florida, studying recording arts engineering. While attending university, Khan would travel back to New York to record music. Khan's father and sister moved back to New York while his mother still lived in Virginia at their house, and Khan would divide his time after university living in the two states. Khan's mother would later move back to New York and live with them in LeFrak City, as they could no longer afford to live in Astoria.

In Queens, Khan would attend day parties where he met many West Indian people, which would go on to influence his music.

== Career ==
=== 2015–2016: Early career and I Don't Know Yet ===
With Fadia Kader, Def Jam's director of brand partnerships and strategic marketing, as his manager, Khan created a musical project and was on the verge of a record deal. Yet he never released anything under the name Anik Khan until the I Don't Know Yet EP, which was released in July 2015 I Don't Know Yet included the singles "Shadows" and "The Knowing". The EP was titled I Don't Know Yet to reflect Khan's feeling of not knowing the direction of his career and music at the time, with different of the songs on the record being years old at the time of its release.

"Too Late Now", produced by Jarreau Vandal, was released in February 2016, while the single "Renegade" released in June 2016. After the release of these singles, Khan's career started to slowly take off with his music being played by Ebro Darden on Beats 1 radio and doing college tours around the country.

=== 2017–2019: Kites, Big Fax and hiatus ===
After the release of the singles "Too Late Now" and "Renegade" and his career beginning to take off, Khan started to put together an album, which would eventually be released as Kites in April 2017. Khan described the album as "less about the immigrant story" and more about himself, "a young guy who's chasing a dream in his late 20s". Khan also described the album as his first proper body of work. The album was supported by the singles "Cleopatra", "Habibi" and "Columbus". "Cleopatra", a love ballad, combines sounds from around the world through using West Indian drums and sampling the Bollywood song "Jiya Jale" from A. R. Rahman's Dil Se.. soundtrack, while also interpolating lyrics from Craig David's song "Fill Me In". "Habibi" is a celebration of immigrant culture, specifically Yemeni culture, reflecting those who run the local bodegas in Queens. The song "Columbus", named after the famed explorer Christopher Columbus, is the outro to the album, and was released as a single in response to President Donald Trump's travel ban. A revolutionary hymn, "Columbus" was described by Khan as about any oppressor and "what they think they did and what really happened". The song ends with Bengali poetry, ending the album with a reflection of his Bengali roots.

In 2018, Khan released two songs, "Oh My" and "Big Fax". The former featured producer Sango and Nigerian artist Burna Boy. The latter was released through Artist Originals, a platform from streaming service JioSaavn (then known as Saavn). Representing immigrant pride, the video features "hijabis with AK's, sports cars AND rickshaws, and black and brown people flourishing and living their best life", according to Khan.

The release of Kites was a commercial success and led to multiple offers for Khan to tour in European cities such as London, Berlin, Amsterdam, and Porto. However, due to his immigration status and lack of American citizenship, Khan had reject the tour offers. This led to him to being looked at, as Khan says, "like I'm this lazy kid that’s not taking advantage, and those offers dried up. I shut down. I became so depressed." As a result, Khan stopped making music for two years.

=== 2020–present: Denied, Approved and return to success ===
After receiving his citizenship, Khan planned a 2020 release for his two-part project, Denied and Approved. However, due to the COVID-19 pandemic and resulting lockdown, the projects were delayed until 2021.

== Style and influences ==
Khan's favorite rapper is fellow Queens native Nas. Outside of hip hop influences, Khan's music draws influence from different cultures, such as South Asian (specifically Bangladeshi and Indian) and West Indian.

== Personal life ==
Khan is a Muslim. He is a fan of English football club Arsenal.

== Discography ==
=== Studio albums ===
- Kites (2017)
- Denied (2021)
- Approved (2021)
- ONĒK (2025)

=== Extended plays ===
- I Don't Know Yet (2015)

=== Singles ===
Year	Song	Album	Notes	Reference(s)
2015	"Shadows"	I Don't Know Yet		
2015	"The Knowing"	I Don't Know Yet		
2016	"Too Late Know"			
2016	"Renegade"			
2016	"Renegade" (ALLxCAPS Remix)			
2016	"Cleopatra"	Kites	Samples the song "Jiya Jale" from Dil Se..	
2017	"Columbus"	Kites		
2017	"Habibi"	Kites		
2018	"Oh My" (featuring Burna Boy & Sango)			
2018	"Big Fax"		Released under Saavn's Artist Originals platform	
2018	"Renaissance Interstate" (Charles Holt featuring Anik Khan)			
