= French the Kid =

British rapper

- Born: Taidgh Moriarty; 11 December 1999 (age 26); Harold Hill, London, England
- Genres: British hip-hop; UK drill
- Occupations: Rapper; singer; songwriter
- Years active: 2019–present
- Label: Dropout UK

Taidgh Moriarty (born 11 December 1999), known professionally as French the Kid, is a British rapper and singer. Born in Harold Hill, his family moved to Australia and France when he was a child. He moved back to the UK in his teens, beginning to release freestyles on Instagram in 2018.

== Early life ==
French the Kid was raised in Romford. He is of Irish descent. In 2009, his family moved to Australia before moving to south west France. There, he would be exposed to numerous French hip-hop artists, including PNL and Jul.

After passing his exams, he moved back to England with his father.

== Career ==
Beginning in 2018, French the Kid released freestyles through Instagram. He released his debut single, "Bella Latina" in 2019; the song switches between English and French.

In 2020, he released "Broken Lives & Stolen Peds", also appearing on the Mad About Bars and Daily Duppy freestyle series, with the latter having 17 million views as of April 2022. He would also collaborate with Kenny Allstar on "Coco".

In 2021, French the Kid released "Essex Boys" with Slimz and a remix of "Playing Games" with Jaykae. Later in the year, he released "Can't Feel My Face" and "Thrill", which peaked at numbers 98 and 90 on the UK Singles Chart, respectively.

In 2022, he released "Remedy", which peaked at number 81. In April, he released his debut mixtape, Never Been Ordinary. He also collaborated with Clean Bandit on a single titled "Sad Girls" in September 2022.

In 2023, he released "Single Player", the lead single from his second mixtape, No Signal.

== Discography ==
=== Mixtapes ===
List of mixtapes, with selected details
Title	Details	Peak chart positions
Title	Details	UK
Never Been Ordinary	Released: 1 April 2022; Label: Dropout UK	21
No Signal	Released: 14 April 2023; Label: Dropout UK	55

=== Charted singles ===
List of charted singles, with selected peak chart positions and certifications
Title	Year	Peak chart positions	Certifications	Album
Title	Year	UK	Certifications	Album
"Can't Feel My Face"	2021	98	BPI: Silver	Never Been Ordinary
"Thrill"	2021	90	BPI: Silver	Never Been Ordinary
"Remedy"	2022	81		Never Been Ordinary
"Neverland"	2022	72		Never Been Ordinary
