= Sanjay Manaktala =

- Born: New York City, United States

Comedy career
- Years active: 2010 - present
- Medium: Stand-up
- Genre: observational comedy
- Subject: Indian culture
- Website: sanjaycomedy.com

Sanjay Manaktala is an Indian American stand-up comedian, based out of Bangalore and performs at different places all over India. With a stand-up experience of more than 4 years, he has performed at over 90 Corporate events and 200 Solo shows throughout the country.

== Biography ==
Sanjay was born in New York City, United States and later moved to Los Angeles, California when his father got transferred with Air India. After graduating from college, Sanjay started working in IT and Consulting in the US, as well as doing comedy on the side as a hobby. He relocated to India in 2010 and has since shifted his focus to stand-up comedy while also working with Accenture as a full-time data analytics consultant. In June 2010, Sanjay formed a performing group, The Polished Bottoms, along with other stand-up comedians Sundeep Rao and Praveen Kumar.

== Career ==
Since moving to India in 2010, Sanjay has been doing stand-up comedy throughout the country, doing shows for corporate, bars, pubs and universities. Sanjay has been performing at the Comedy Store in Mumbai since December 2010. He also regularly features on the 'Best in Stand Up Comedy' showcase with other Indian and international acts, and has also done the Local Heroes and New Stuff comedy showcases.

In March 2010, Sanjay started a YouTube channel named sanjaycomedy where he regularly posts videos with different kinds of comedy content including sketches and stand-up videos among others. Sanjay is particularly known for his techie humor videos. In this genre, he has been making a series of videos called IT Guy, which he describes as a parody for all the IT Engineers.
