= Rashmeet Kaur =

Indian singer-songwriter (born 1994)

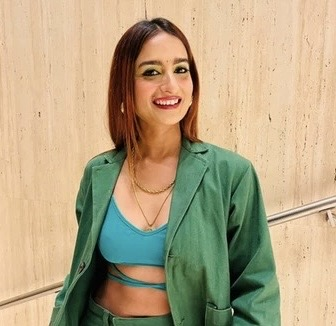

Background information
- Born: 8 March 1994 (age 32); Punjab, India
- Genres: Indian classical, hip-hop, sufi
- Occupations: Singer; song writer; Bollywood playback; actor
- Instruments: Vocals, harmonium
- Years active: 2011–present
- Labels: Sony Music; Universal; Zee Music; Times Music; Tips; Kalamkaar
- Website: Official website

Rashmeet Kaur (born 8 March 1994) is an Indian singer, composer, and songwriter known for her songs "Nadiyon Paar" from the film Roohi, "Jadi Buti", and "Ishq Nachaawe" from the film Kho Gaye Hum Kahan.

== Early life ==
Rashmeet Kaur was born in Punjab, India, in 1994 and raised in New Delhi. At the age of six, she began learning and performing Gurmat Sangeet (Sikh devotional music) from her mother. She received her Indian classical music training at Gandharva Mahavidyalaya in Delhi and learned Gurmat Sangeet from her teacher Jasvinder Kaur. During her college days, she formed a band and started performing in the city and got exposed to the live music industry.

== Career ==
=== 2011-2015: Career beginnings ===
Rashmeet began her career in 2011 by co-singing and touring with Bollywood singers.

In 2012, she appeared as one of the contestants on the singing reality show Sa Re Ga Ma Pa. In 2013, she participated in the fourth season of the Punjabi singing competition series Voice of Punjab. She was one of the top 10 contestants on the show. She rose to fame for appearing as a contestant in Asia's Singing Superstar (2015).

=== 2016-2021: Kalamkaar and mainstream recognition ===
Rashmeet lent her vocals to the movie Phillauri in 2017, singing the Punjabi folk song "Heer". In 2018, Rashmeet participated in The Remix, an Amazon Prime original music competition judged by Sunidhi Chauhan, Amit Trivedi, and Nucleya. The show featured 10 episodes where 10 teams competed against each other. Rashmeet was paired with Su Real. She won the competition after competing in the finale against Sreerama Chandra-Candice Redding and Thomson Andrews-NSG. This led to her bagging some collaborations with Nucleya on his album Tota Myna. Kaur signed with rapper Raftaar's label Kalamkaar, which was founded in 2017. Her first single "Maati Ki Gudiya" was released in the year 2018. The song was an initiative to raise awareness on child marriages happening in India and was included in her EP, Musafir, which released in 2019. Musafir featured four songs, that were fusion takes on the poetry of Bulleh Shah and Shah Hussain. The EP's live rendition, whose track, "Faqeeran" became a commercial hit, was released in 2025. Rashmeet released her debut album, Manjh Muhabbat Teri in November 2020.

Her song "Jadi Buti", a collaboration with Major Lazer, Diplo, and Nucleya for their album Music Is the Weapon, became a major hit and the album was later nominated for the Grammy Awards.

Her 2021 collaboration with labelmate Raftaar, "Ghana Kasoota", became a widespread commercial success, with the music video featuring Surbhi Jyoti, garnering over 160 million views on YouTube as of January 2026. She rose to fame for recreating the popular Punjabi folk songs "Bajre Da Sitta", "Buhe Bariyan", "Ik Meri Aakh Kashni", and "Nadiyon Paar", which is a recreated version of singer Shamur’s popular 2008 track "Let The Music Play". This song was featured in Hardik Mehta's 2021 comedy-horror film Roohi, starring Rajkummar Rao, Janhvi Kapoor, and Varun Sharma. It was released on March 3, 2021.

=== 2023-present: Sophomore album, and further successes ===
In 2023, Rashmeet appeared on the TV reality show Fear Factor: Khatron Ke Khiladi Season 13, which was filmed in South Africa.

She further contributed to Hindi film soundtracks "Thumkeshwari" from Bhediya, "Janiye" from Chor Nikal Ke Bhaga, and "Ishq Nachaawe", which she composed and sung for the film Kho Gaye Hum Kahan alongside rapper Yashraj. Her song "Jee Karda" for the eponymous television series received a nomination for a Filmfare Award.

In 2023, Rashmeet collaborated with singer-songwriter C-Mart (aka Chukwuma Martin Okoye), Congolese artist Gaz Mawete, and Germany-based producer Konstantin Reinfeld on the song "Cherie Coco". In the same year, Rashmeet teamed up with Khanvict and Raaginder for the track "Devotion" which was part of the EP Arrival.

On January 11, 2024, Rashmeet released her sophomore album, Kaura, featuring 12 songs. She collaborated with 10 producers and over 30 artists to create the collection. Aaryaman Trivedi of Rolling Stone India wrote in his review of the album, "Kaur’s unmatched vocal abilities have catapulted her to the top of her league, with this album being an attempt to shift gears into newer regions."

In July 2026, she premiered the song "Ve Sajjna" on A Colors Show, from her then-upcoming third studio album. She released the album, Parinda, on August 11, 2026. The album blends Punjabi folk, R&B, jazz and Sufi music sounds.

== Awards and recognition ==
Year	Award	Category	Work	Result	Ref
2017	Mirchi Music Awards (Bangla)	Upcoming Female Voice of the Year	"Bedardi Balma"	Won	
2018	The Remix	—	—	Won	
2022	Grammy Awards	Best Dance/Electronic Album	Music Is the Weapon (Reloaded) (as a featured artist)	Nominated	
2022	Clef Award	Best Electronic Song	"Oceana"	Won	
2023	Filmfare OTT Awards	Best Original Soundtrack (Series)	Jee Karda (as a featured artist)	Nominated	
2023	Zee Media National Achievers Award	Impactful Voice in Contemporary Music	—	Won	
2023	7th Radio City Freedom Awards	Best Pop Artist	"Lagan Lagi"	Won	

== Discography ==
=== Singles ===
Year	Song	Language	Composer(s)	Co-Artist(s)	Notes
2018	Maati ki Gudiya	Hindi	Rashmeet Kaur, Nikhil Malhotra		
2018	Haalaat	Hindi	Rashmeet Kaur		
2019	Vyah Nai Karana	Punjabi	Nikhil Malhotra		
2019	Ik Meri	Punjabi	Deep Kalsi		
2019	Sartaj	Punjabi	Raftaar		
2019	Nayi Zindagi	Hindi	Rashmeet Kaur, Abhishek Nailwal	Abhishek Nailwal	
2019	Koi Dekh Lega	Hindi	Kshitij Tarey	Gurashish Singh	
2020	Tere Naal Laiyan	Punjabi	Rashmeet Kaur		
2020	Nahi Aaya	Hindi	Rashmeet Kaur		
2020	Jadi Buti	Hindi	Major Lazer & Nucleya		
2020	Mask On	Hindi	Raftaar	Raftaar, Karma, Yunan	
2020	Haan	Hindi	Raftaar	Raftaar, Harjas	
2020	Tera Mera Saanjha	Hindi	Lakshay	Suyyash Rai	
2020	Ik Baba	Punjabi	Rashmeet Kaur		
2021	Bajre da Sitta	Punjabi	Deep Kalsi & Rashmeet Kaur		
2021	Bing Bing Boo	Hindi	Yashraj Mukhate	Kisna, Yashraj Mukhate	
2021	Осеana	Punjabi	Rashmeet Kaur, Gurbax		
2021	Ghana Kasoota	Punjabi	Raftaar		
2021	Saiyyonee	Hindi	Gourov Dasgupta	Gaurav Dasgupta, Yasser Desai	
2021	Daru Hor Piyade	Punjabi	Harjas Harjaayi, Deep Kalsi	Deep Kalsi	
2022	Kahan Hai Tu	Hindi	Huzaif Nazar & Hyder Dar		
2022	Fresh	Punjabi			
2022	Mor	Hindi		IKKA	
2022	Maiya Meri	Hindi		B. Ajaneesh Loknath	
2023	Wine Am Go Low	Hindi			
2023	Vibe Cute Badi	Punjabi	Akshay & IP	IP Singh	
2023	Nikki Jehi sui	Punjabi	Akshay & IP		
2023	Aja Sawariya	Hindi	Rusha & Blizza		
2023	Tere Bin Laage	Punjabi	Nikhil Chandrakant Kotibhaskar		
2023	Taqdeer	Hindi	Donn Bhat	Prabh Deep, Sakur Khan Sufi, Lateeb Khan, Satar Khan	
2023	Stardust	Punjabi	Sachin – Jigar	IP Singh	
2023	Dil Khanjjar	Hindi	Rashmeet Kaur		
2023	Cherie Coco	Hindi	Rashmeet Kaur, C-mart	C-Mart, Gaz Mawete	
2023	Devotion	Hindi			
2023	Malaal	Hindi	Munawar, Charan	Munawar Faruqui	
2023	Madhaniyan	Punjabi	Lijo George & Dj Chetas	Rahul Vaidya & Asees Kaur	
2023	Teri Meri	Hindi	Kirat Gill	Kirat Gill	
2023	Bedardi Balma	Hindi	Neel Dutt		
2024	Larhda	Punjabi	Baba		
2024	Mai Sutti Raiyaan	Punjabi	Deep Jandu		
2024	Teri Teri	Hindi	Rashmeet Kaur & C-Mart	C-Mart, Ice Prince, Konstantin Reinfeld	
2025	Behja	Punjabi	Rashmeet Kaur, Dhrruv Yogi	Saurabh Lokhande	
2026	Jogi Naal	Punjabi	Rashmeet Kaur	Aden	

=== Albums ===
Year	Album/EP	Track	Composer(s)	Notes
2019	Musafir	Kahaan	Rashmeet Kaur	
2019	Musafir	Aa Mil Yar	Rashmeet Kaur	
2019	Musafir	Musafir	Rashmeet Kaur	
2019	Musafir	Main Bulbul	Rashmeet Kaur	
2020	Manjh Muhabbat Teri	Nadi Tarandari	Jaswinder Kaur	
2020	Manjh Muhabbat Teri	Chaar Padarath	Gurbani Sangeet Academy, Delhi	
2020	Manjh Muhabbat Teri	Har Har Naam Apaar Amoli	Jaswinder Kaur	
2020	Manjh Muhabbat Teri	Jagat Main Jhoothi Dekhi Preet	Rashmeet Kaur	
2020	Manjh Muhabbat Teri	Main Andhule Ki Tek	Jaswinder Kaur	
2020	Manjh Muhabbat Teri	Tere Banke Loyen	Ajit Singh	
2022	Kya Kariye	Lagan Lagi	Rashmeet Kaur	
2022	Kya Kariye	Bulleya O	Rashmeet Kaur	
2022	Kya Kariye	Tan Diyan	Rashmeet Kaur	
2023	Kaura (Aura Of Kaur)	Haye Ri Duniya	Rashmeet Kaur, Ikka, Rusha & Blizza	
2023	Kaura (Aura Of Kaur)	Pyaar Ki Bahaar	Rashmeet Kaur, Munawar Faruqui	
2023	Kaura (Aura Of Kaur)	Udd Jana	Rashmeet Kaur, Wazir Patar, Dhrruv Yogi	
2023	Kaura (Aura Of Kaur)	Limitless Pyaar	Rashmeet Kaur, Gurbax, Fateh	
2023	Kaura (Aura Of Kaur)	Bairi Piya	Rashmeet Kaur, Farhan Khan	
2023	Kaura (Aura Of Kaur)	Chalo!!!	Rashmeet Kaur, DVK	
2023	Kaura (Aura Of Kaur)	Sherni	Rashmeet Kaur, Simran Kaur Dhadli	
2023	Kaura (Aura Of Kaur)	Bediyan	Rashmeet Kaur, Tracy De Sa, Reble	
2023	Kaura (Aura Of Kaur)	Rahaan	Rashmeet Kaur, GD47, Hashbass	
2023	Kaura (Aura Of Kaur)	Mehenga	Rashmeet Kaur, Seedhe Maut, NDS	
2023	Kaura (Aura Of Kaur)	Bholay	Rashmeet Kaur, Muhfaad	
2023	Kaura (Aura Of Kaur)	Fly So High	Rashmeet Kaur, Arivu	

=== Web-series songs ===
- Mirzapur (2018)
- Four More Shots Please! (2022)
- Jee Karda (2023)

=== Hindi film songs ===
Year	Film	Song	Composer(s)	Co-singer(s)
2017	Phillauri	Heer	Rashmeet Kaur	
2021	Roohi	Nadiyon Paar	Sachin-Jigar	Shamur, IP Singh, Sachin-Jigar
2022	Bhediya	Thumkeshwari	Sachin-Jigar	Ash King, Divya Kumar
2022	Banaras	Maiya Meri	B. Ajaneesh Loknath	
2023	Chor Nikal Ke Bhaga	Janiye	Vishal Mishra	
2023	Kho Gaye Hum Kahan	Ishq Nachaawe	Rashmeet Kaur, Karan Kanchan	Yashraj
2023	Tejas	Dil Hai Ranjhana	Shashwat Sachdev	
2023	Dhak Dhak	Sadke Sadke	Osho Jain	
2025	Maalik	Dil Thaam Ke	Sachin-Jigar	Rana Mazumder
2025	Thamma	Dilbar Ki Aankhon Ka	Sachin-Jigar	Jigar Saraiya
2026	Mirzapur (film)	"Ghoom Ghoom"	Ray	
