= MTV Europe Music Award for Best India Act =

Category of MTV Europe Music Awards

The following is a list of the MTV Europe Music Award winners and nominees for Best India Act.

== Winners and nominees ==
Winners are listed first and highlighted in bold.

=== 2010s ===
Year	Artist	Ref
2012
2012	**Alobo Naga & The Band**	
2012	Bandish Projekt	
2012	Indus Creed	
2012	Menwhopause	
2012	Oliver Sean	
2013
2013	**Yo Yo Honey Singh**	
2013	Amit Trivedi	
2013	AR Rahman	
2013	Mithoon	
2013	Pritam	
2014
2014	**Yo Yo Honey Singh**	
2014	Meet Bros Anjjan	
2014	Pritam	
2014	Vishal–Shekhar	
2014	Pre-nominations: A R Rahman; Ankit Tiwari; Himesh Reshammiya; Sohail Sen	
2015
2015	**Priyanka Chopra**	
2015	Indus Creed	
2015	Monica Dogra	
2015	The Ska Vengers	
2015	Your Chin	
2016
2016	**Prateek Kuhad**	
2016	Anoushka Shankar	
2016	Bandish Projekt	
2016	Monica Dogra	
2016	Uday Benegal & Friends	
2017
2017	**Hard Kaur**	
2017	Yatharth	
2017	Nucleya	
2017	Parekh & Singh	
2017	Raja Kumari	
2018
2018	**Big Ri and Meba Ofilia**	
2018	Raja Kumari ft. Divine	
2018	Monica Dogra & Curtain Blue	
2018	Skyharbor	
2018	Nikhil	
2019
2019	**Emiway Bantai**	
2019	Komorebi	
2019	Parikrama	
2019	Prateek Kuhad	
2019	Raja Kumari	

=== 2020s ===
Year	Artist	Ref
2020
2020	**Armaan Malik**	
2020	Divine	
2020	Kaam Bhaari	
2020	Prabh Deep	
2020	Siri & Sez on the Beat	
2021
2021	**DIVINE**	
2021	Kaam Bhaari	
2021	Raja Kumari	
2021	Ananya Birla	
2021	Zephyrtone	
2022
2022	**Armaan Malik**	
2022	Gurbax	
2022	Raja Kumari	
2022	Badshah	
2022	Zephyrtone	
2023
2023	**Tsumyoki**	
2023	Dee MC	
2023	DIVINE	
2023	Mali	
2023	When Chai Met Toast	
2024
2024	**Mali**	
2024	Armaan Malik	
2024	Chirag Todi	
2024	Dee MC & EPR	
2024	Hanumankind	
2024	Kamakshi Khanna	

== See also ==
- MTV Immies
- MTV Asia Award for Favorite Artist India
- MTV VMA International Viewer's Choice Award for MTV India
