= Raaginder =

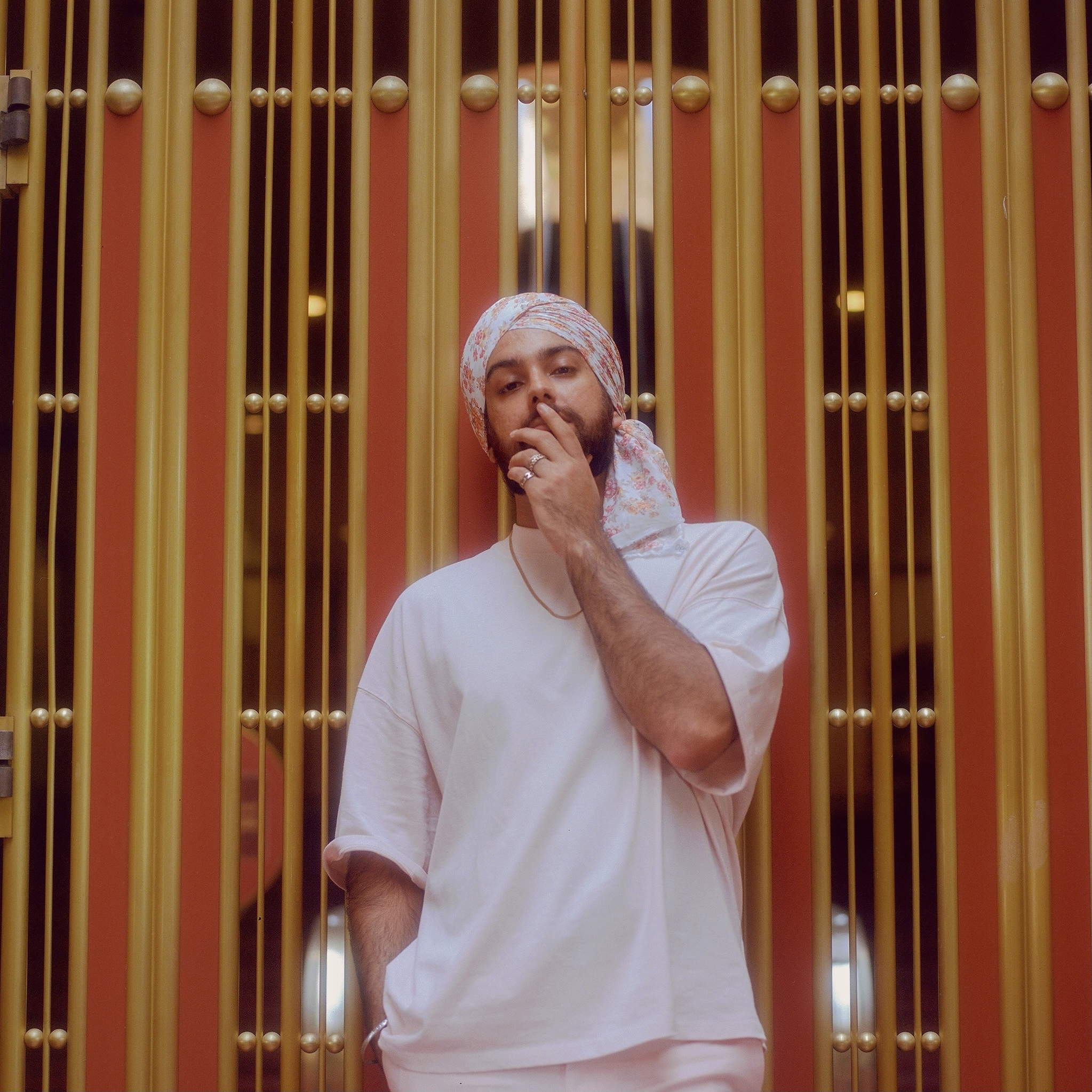

Background information
- Also known as: Violinder (former)
- Born: Raaginder Singh Momi; November 27, 1992 (age 33); Bangkok, Thailand
- Origin: Hayward, California, U.S.
- Genres: Hip Hop; Bhangra; Classical; Indian Classical; Pop; Rap
- Occupations: Songwriter; Music producer; Violinist; Singer; Composer
- Instrument: Violin · Vocalist · Producer
- Years active: 2011–present
- Label: Dream Oasis · Universal India
- Website: raaginder.com

Raaginder Singh Momi (/ɹɔɚɡdɝ/; born November 27, 1992), better known by his stage name raaginder, is a Union City, California–based violinist, music producer and songwriter of Punjabi descent. His professional music career began in 2011 when he released his first mixtape Take One... on December 11, 2011, following up with his debut studio album Beach Chair on October 29, 2014, and later his first EP, escape released December 28, 2017.

== Early life and career ==
Born into a musical family, Raaginder's father being a professional sitar player and his mother being a vocalist, Raaginder was exposed to different types of music. He first started playing violin when he was 11 years old. Later in 2004, he became a disciple of a renowned Indian classical artist, Sisirkana Dhar Chowdhury after his father found an ad of her in India Currents Magazine and discovered she was teaching in Fremont, California, becoming Chowdhury's pupil, Raaginder has been under her guidance ever since. Being exposed to different types of music, Raaginder has experimented and tried playing different genres of music such as Hip-Hop, Punjabi, Indian classical and more. After high school, Raaginder began producing beats and infusing genres to create his sound. Doing covers, he would post his covers to download sites like MediaFire until encouraged to post on YouTube. He cites YouTube as helping to jump start his career.

Raaginder has also played the United States national anthem for the Los Angeles Clippers and played at the White House on numerous occasions. In the wake of the 2016 elections, Raaginder also stated his opinion on the outcome.

== Music ==
In an interview with NBC News Asia, Raaginder stated about his musical sound, "Music can be interpreted in any way. I try to make music that's universal to every aspect ...the one obvious message is my identity. I want my identity to be known with my music. This turban and beard, I feel like, is a big part of why I am where I am today. So even though I'll do a 'Hotline Bling' cover, the fact that there's aspects of the music that are foreign and even the aspects of me – the way I look – I think that makes a difference because it's something people haven't seen, and it's something people need to see."

In an interview with Brown Girl Magazine, Raaginder stated; "the neighborhood I lived in and the school I went to was primarily Latino and Black. Due to that, the first genre of music I was drawn to when I moved to America was hip-hop. Hip-Hop was the gateway for me to be relatable to the other students. Everyone around the school knew all of the hits word for word and I started picking it up as well. I know it was a shock to many kids around me that a little-turbaned boy from Asia listened to rap on the regular. Around the same time, I had started to learn the violin (in the classical and Indian classical tradition). Although Indian classical violin was completely left field from hip-hop, they both instilled resiliency and confidence in me which allowed me to defend myself and be comfortable in my own skin. What started as a tool to connect with others, ended up becoming my identity over the years. It got to the point where a couple of my friends started calling me “Violinder.”

== Personal life ==
In 2014 Raaginder's mother died from cancer. He cites her as his main inspiration for actively pursuing music. The song "Raindrops" from his studio album Beach Chair was dedicated in her honor. Raaginder is also the eldest of two children.

Raaginder also studied at the California Institute of the Arts (Cal Arts) where he received his Bachelor of Fine Arts in world music performance.

== Discography ==
=== Studio albums ===
- Letters From the Other Side (2022)
- Moment in Time (2020)
- Beach Chair (2014)

=== EPs ===
- Voyage (2024)
- Awakening (2024)
- You Thought (2023)
- escape (2017)

=== Mixtapes ===
- Take One... (2011)

=== Singles ===
Promotional and Album Singles
Year	Title	Featured Artists / Producer	Album / EP
2026	douluvme		be:coming
2025	Barsa	Anik Khan, HYDR, Surtaal Singh	
2025	Astounding	Ro Hardy	
2023	Gone Soon		
2023	While I'm Alive	uncertainT	
2022	Chasing Sunsets	Gurtêj	
2021	Departure		
2020	Petals	The Lost Strings	
2014	Dhlona Ve (Feat. Tina Mann)		Beach Chair
2014	Raindrops		Beach Chair
2014	Bonfire/Coastin' (Feat. Sodhivine & KinG!)		Beach Chair
2017	Mind Right		escape
2018	Mirage (Feat. Dalbir Singh)		escape

=== Features & Remixes ===
Year	Title	Album
2013	Naiem – Henna Girl (Feat. Raaginder)	
2013	Marcus Orelias – Katie's Requiem (Feat. Vinnie Anastasia & Raaginder) [prod. by Felly]	Rebel of the Underground
2014	Tanu Arora – Mahi Ve (Cover) (Feat. Raaginder)	
2014	Blossoms Interlude (Feat. Raaginder)	
2015	Echoes (Feat. Raaginder)	
2015	Bliss (Feat. Penn Masala, Kavita Seth & Raaginder)	
2015	Lean On / Jind Mahi (Mashup) (Feat. Ricky Jatt, Raashi Kulkarni & Raaginder)	
2015	PARLOQUE x TOMFW (Feat. Raaginder)	
2015	Mud Aaja (Come Back) (Feat. Violinder)	
2016	Fateh – 100 Bande (Feat. Raaginder)	Bring It Home

=== Music videos ===
As Main Artist and Featured
Year	Title	Album
2014	Dholna Ve (Feat. Tina Mann)	Beach Chair
2014	Raindrops	Beach Chair
2014	Bonfire/Coastin' (Feat. Sodhivine & KinG!)	Beach Chair
2016	100 Bande (Feat. Raaginder)	Fateh – Bring It Home
2017	Mind Right	escape
2018	Mirage (Feat. Dalbir Singh)	escape
2019	Butterflies	Single
2019	Inferno	Single
2019	Summer Nights (Feat. Wisechild)	Single
2020	Echoes	Single
2020	Fade Away	Single
2022	Nobody (Feat. Sodhivine)	Letters From The Other Side

=== Voice Over ===
Year	Title	Role
2017	20s A Difficult Age	Citizen (uncredited)

== See also ==
- List of Indian musicians
- List of people from California
