= Nucleya =

Indian DJ

- Nucleya in 2020

Background information
- Born: Udyan Sagar; 7 December 1979 (age 46); Agra, Uttar Pradesh, India
- Origin: Ahmedabad, India
- Genres: EDM; Bass music; Moombahton; Desi hip hop; Indian pop
- Occupations: Musician; DJ; Remixer; Record producer
- Years active: 1998–present

Udyan Sagar, better known by his stage name Nucleya, is an Indian electronic music producer and DJ.

== Career ==
In 1998, Udyan co-founded Bandish Projekt with Mayur Narvekar and Mehirr Nath Choppra. In 2007, Udyan left Bandish Projekt after working with Mayur for about 12 years, and rebuilt himself as "Nucleya". After leaving Bandish Projekt his career struggled quite a bit initially. He drew inspiration from South Indian film music and Indian street music, and released his first EP Koocha Monster in 2013. In 2015, Nucleya released his debut album, Bass Rani, at a Ganpati visarjan on the streets of Mumbai. In the following year, he released another album Raja Baja.

Nucleya, in collaboration with AIB, hosted and picked the winners of Bacardi House Party Sessions in 2017. He also judged the first season of the singing reality show The Remix in 2018 and the Indian hip-hop reality show MTV Hustle in 2019. 2019 also marked the release of his third studio album Tota Myna, which featured high-profile collaborators including Rashmeet Kaur, Raftaar, Anirudh Ravichander and Shruti Haasan. In 2021, he released an EP titled Baaraat, in collaboration with Ritviz. The four track EP was accompanied by a series of NFTs. He has performed at EDC Las Vegas and Mexico, the Bacardi NH7 Weekender, Sunburn Festival, Zomaland by Zomato, VH1 Supersonic and YouTube Fanfest. He has opened for and performed with DJs Skrillex, Major Lazer, DJ Snake and Krewella.

== Personal life ==
In 2008, he married his long-term girlfriend Smriti Choudhary. The couple currently lives in Goa, with their son Guri, who was born in 2011. Guri has featured on some of Nucleya's tracks as "Guri Gangsta".

== Discography ==
=== Albums and EPs ===
| Year | Album / EP | Track | Artist(s) | Note(s) |
|---|---|---|---|---|
| 2009 | Pragat Pritam | Pragat Pritam | Nucleya | |
| 2009 | Pragat Pritam | Pragat Pritam (Dub) | Nucleya | |
| 2009 | Pragat Pritam | Beat 1 | Nucleya | |
| 2009 | Beat 1 | Beat 1 | Nucleya | |
| 2009 | Beat 1 | Beat 1 (Nuphlo Remix) | Nucleya | |
| 2009 | Beat 1 | Beat 1 (Deaf Bass Twins Remix) | Nucleya | |
| 2010 | Horn Ok Please | Dum Maro Dum (Remix) | Nucleya, MC JD & R. D. Burman | Remixes of famous retro Bollywood songs |
| 2010 | Horn Ok Please | Chandan Sa Bandan (Remix) | Nucleya & Kalyanji-Anandji | Remixes of famous retro Bollywood songs |
| 2010 | Horn Ok Please | Boom Boom (Remix) | Nucleya, Shivang & Biddu | Remixes of famous retro Bollywood songs |
| 2010 | Horn Ok Please | Disco Dancer (Remix) | Nucleya, Bappi Lahiri & Anuj Matthews | Remixes of famous retro Bollywood songs |
| 2010 | Horn Ok Please | Mein Ek Chor (Remix) | Nucleya & R. D. Burman | Remixes of famous retro Bollywood songs |
| 2010 | Horn Ok Please | Raat Baki (Remix) | Nucleya, Sound Avtar, Bappi Lahiri & Anuj Matthews | Remixes of famous retro Bollywood songs |
| 2010 | Horn Ok Please | Aao Huzur (Remix) | Nucleya & O. P. Nayyar | Remixes of famous retro Bollywood songs |
| 2011 | Khandit Nayaka | Khandit Nayaka (Original Mix) | Nucleya | |
| 2011 | Khandit Nayaka | Khandit Nayaka (B.R.E.E.D. Remix) | Nucleya | |
| 2011 | Khandit Nayaka | Khandit Nayaka (Piyush Bhatnagar Remix) | Nucleya | |
| 2011 | Khandit Nayaka | Khandit Nayaka (iSIDE Remix) | Nucleya | |
| 2012 | In My Heart Remixes | In My Heart (David Hiller Remix) | Nucleya | |
| 2012 | In My Heart Remixes | In My Heart (Dead Battery Remix) | Nucleya | |
| 2012 | In My Heart Remixes | In My Heart (Nucleya VIP Remix) | Nucleya | |
| 2012 | In My Heart Remixes | In My Heart (Oh Tebins! Remix) | Nucleya | |
| 2012 | In My Heart Remixes | In My Heart (Original Mix) | Nucleya | Featured in the compilation dimmSummer Presents: Sub Continental Bass |
| 2013 | Koocha Monster | Street Boy | Nucleya | |
| 2013 | Koocha Monster | Bell Gaadi | Nucleya ft. Chinna Ponnu & Relok | |
| 2013 | Koocha Monster | Akkad Bakkad | Nucleya | |
| 2013 | Koocha Monster | Bangla Bass | Nucleya ft. Mou Sultana & Brooklyn Shanti | |
| 2013 | Koocha Monster | Jamrock | Nucleya | |
| 2013 | Koocha Monster | New Delhi Nuttah | Nucleya ft. Delhi Sultanate | |
| 2015 | Bass Rani | Jungle Raja | Nucleya ft. Divine | |
| 2015 | Bass Rani | Laung Gawacha | Nucleya ft. Avneet Khurmi | |
| 2015 | Bass Rani | Bass Rani | Nucleya | Featured in the compilation Billboard Presents Electric Asia, Vol. 1 |
| 2015 | Bass Rani | Aaja | Nucleya ft. Avneet Khurmi & Guri Gangsta | |
| 2015 | Bass Rani | Chennai Bass | Nucleya ft. Sivamani & Chinna Ponnu | |
| 2015 | Bass Rani | Heer | Nucleya ft. Shruti Pathak | Remix of song released as part of The Dewarists |
| 2015 | Bass Rani | Mumbai Dance | Nucleya ft. Julius Sylvest & Gagan Mudgal | |
| 2015 | Bass Rani | F**K Nucleya | Nucleya | |
| 2016 | Raja Baja | Take Me There | Nucleya ft. KAVYA | Featured in the compilation "EDC Las Vegas 2017" |
| 2016 | Raja Baja | Bhayanak Atma | Nucleya ft. Gagan Mudgal | |
| 2016 | Raja Baja | Scene Kya Hai | Nucleya & DIVINE | |
| 2016 | Raja Baja | Jind Mahi | Nucleya ft. Avneet Khurmi | |
| 2016 | Raja Baja | Bakar Bakar | Nucleya | Featured in the 2023 film Spider-Man: Across the Spider-Verse |
| 2016 | Raja Baja | Lights | Nucleya | Featured in the compilation EDC Mexico 2017 |
| 2019 | Tota Myna | Lori | Nucleya ft. Vibha Saraf | |
| 2019 | Tota Myna | Mirza | Nucleya ft. Rashmeet Kaur & Raftaar | |
| 2019 | Tota Myna | Sohneya | Nucleya ft. Avneet Khurmi & Soltan | |
| 2019 | Tota Myna | Mahiya | Nucleya ft. Rashmeet Kaur & Whales | |
| 2019 | Tota Myna | Out of Your Mind | Nucleya ft. Shruti Haasan | |
| 2019 | Tota Myna | Going to America | Nucleya ft. Anirudh Ravichander & Anthony Daasan | |
| 2021 | Baaraat | Sathi | Ritviz & Nucleya | |
| 2021 | Baaraat | Ari Ari | Ritviz & Nucleya | |
| 2021 | Baaraat | Roz | Ritviz & Nucleya | |
| 2021 | Baaraat | Baaraat | Ritviz & Nucleya | |
| 2023-2024 | Chamkillah | Jogi | Goldie Sohel & Nucleya | |
| 2023-2024 | Chamkillah | Kobita | Nucleya ft. Zubeen Garg & Puna | |
| 2023-2024 | Chamkillah | Kamli | Nucleya ft. Mitika Kanwar & Da Fyer | |
| 2023-2024 | Chamkillah | Khoye Panchi | Osho Jain & Nucleya | |
| 2023-2024 | Chamkillah | Lightyears | Nucleya ft. Tsumyoki & Da Fyer | |
| 2023-2024 | Chamkillah | Narenge Narenge | Nucleya & Benny Dayal | |
| 2026 | Diggi Bumba | Diggi Bumba | Nucleya & Anu Malik | |
| 2026 | Diggi Bumba | Gup Chup | Nucleya & RjDV | |
| 2026 | Diggi Bumba | Death Roll | Nucleya & Arya Dhayal | |
| 2026 | Diggi Bumba | Jogan | Nucleya & Gulshan Kumar | |
| 2026 | Diggi Bumba | Kadhi Kadhi | Nucleya & Dorwin John | |
| 2026 | Diggi Bumba | Happy Mood | Nucleya & Anthony Daasan | |
| 2026 | Diggi Bumba | Nerenge Nerenge | Nucleya & Benny Dayal | |
| 2026 | Diggi Bumba | Sitaram | Nucleya & Chirag Katti | |
| 2026 | Diggi Bumba | Death Roll (VIP) | Nucleya & Arya Dhayal | |
| 2026 | Diggi Bumba | Bhayanak Atma (VIP) | Nucleya & Gagan Mudgal | |

=== Singles and collaborations ===
| Year | Track | Artist(s) | Note(s) |
|---|---|---|---|
| 2010 | Tonic (Nucleya Remix) | MIDIval Punditz & Nucleya | From the EP Tonic Remixes by MIDIval Punditz |
| 2011 | Electro Me | Shivang & Nucleya | |
| 2011 | 16 Athamita Kasi (Nucleya Remix) | Ranidu & Nucleya | From the album Hinahenne Mung by Ranidu |
| 2014 | Tamil Fever | Nucleya & Benny Dayal | Adapted for the song "Let's Nacho" |
| 2014 | Little Lotto | Alo Wala & Nucleya ft. MC Zulu | |
| 2016 | Bacardi Drop | Nucleya | Anthem of Bacardi House Party Sessions |
| 2016 | Memories | Nucleya & Papon | Released as part of The Dewarists |
| 2017 | Dhoop | Nucleya ft. Vibha Saraf | |
| 2019 | Yaaron (Yari Version) | Clinton Cerejo & Nucleya | From the compilation "Yaari Jam" by Sony Music India |
| 2019 | Good on You | Krewella & Nucleya | From the album zer0 by Krewella |
| 2020 | Thandi Hawa (Nucleya Remix) | Ritviz & Nucleya | From the EP Thandi Hawa (Official Remixes) by Ritviz |
| 2020 | Vajantri | Perk Pietrek & Nucleya | |
| 2020 | Jadi Buti | Major Lazer & Nucleya ft. Rashmeet Kaur | From the album Music Is the Weapon (Reloaded) by Major Lazer |
| 2020 | Tere Bina | Nucleya ft. Avneet Khurmi | Released in collaboration with OnePlus to promote the BWZ Bass Edition earphones |
| 2021 | Jadi Buti (Nucleya VIP Remix) | Major Lazer & Nucleya ft. Rashmeet Kaur | From the album Music Is the Weapon (Remixes) by Major Lazer |
| 2021 | Kanaa | Nucleya, 2jaym & Sublahshini | Released as part of Bacardi Sessions |
| 2021 | Jaldi Aao | Nucleya | Released in collaboration with Netflix India to promote the show Money Heist |
| 2024 | Kobita | Nucleya, Zubeen Garg | |

=== Film music ===
| Year | Film | Song | Music | Co-singer(s) | Notes |
|---|---|---|---|---|---|
| 2009 | Short Kut | Patli Galli (Remix) | Shankar-Ehsaan-Loy | Shankar Mahadevan, DJ Nasha | |
| 2016 | Kapoor & Sons | Let's Nacho | Benny Dayal, Nucleya | Benny Dayal, Badshah | |
| 2017 | Mukkabaaz | Paintra | Nucleya | DIVINE | |
| 2017 | Mukkabaaz | Paintra (Extended Version) | Nucleya | DIVINE | |
| 2018 | High Jack | Behka | Vibha Saraf, Nucleya | Vibha Saraf | |
| 2020 | Choked: Paisa Bolta Hai | Nerugi | Benny Dayal, Nucleya | Benny Dayal | |
| 2023 | Spider-Man: Across the Spider-Verse | Bakar Bakar | Nucleya | Solo | Hindi Dub |

== Awards and nominations ==
| Year | Awards | Category | Recipient | Outcome | Ref(s) |
|---|---|---|---|---|---|
| 2016 | Global Indian Music Awards | Best Electronica Single | Alo Wala & Nucleya ft. MC Zulu – Little Lotto | Won | |
| 2016 | Global Indian Music Awards | Best Electronica Single | Nucleya ft. DIVINE – Jungle Raja | Won | |
| 2017 | Mirchi Music Awards | Critics' Choice Album of The Year | Kapoor & Sons | Nominated | |
| 2017 | Filmfare Award | Best Music Album | Kapoor & Sons | Nominated | |
| 2017 | MTV Europe Music Awards | Best Indian Act | Nucleya | Nominated | |

== Documentaries ==
- Nucleya - Ride To The Roots. 2017 documentary, Red Bull Media House, 29 minutes.
