= Happy New Year (soundtrack) =

Soundtrack album by Vishal–Shekhar
- Released: 15 September 2014
- Recorded: 2012–2014
- Studios: Vishal & Shekhar Studios, Mumbai
- Genre: Feature film soundtrack
- Length: 46:02
- Languages: Hindi; English
- Label: T-Series
- Producers: Vishal–Shekhar; Abhijit Vaghani

Vishal–Shekhar chronology
Bang Bang! (2014)	Happy New Year (2014)	Fan (2016)

Happy New Year is the soundtrack album to the 2014 film of the same name directed by Farah Khan and produced by Red Chillies Entertainment starring an ensemble cast of Shah Rukh Khan, Deepika Padukone, Abhishek Bachchan, Sonu Sood, Boman Irani, Vivaan Shah and Jackie Shroff. The soundtrack featured 11 tracks composed by Vishal–Shekhar and lyrics written by Irshad Kamil. The album was released through T-Series on 15 September 2014 to positive reviews from critics.

== Background ==
Vishal–Shekhar composed the soundtrack in their third collaboration with Farah Khan following Om Shanti Om (2007) and Tees Maar Khan (2010); John Stewart Eduri composed the background score. The duo worked on the film's music, having composed the tunes during early-2012 till 2013 and continued recording throughout 2014. Irshad Kamil, who they had collaborated with in Shabd, Karam (both 2005), Anjaana Anjaani (2010) and Rascals (2011), came on board as principal lyricist; Kumaar, a frequent collaborator of the duo, who had written the Punjabi portions of "Jag Soona Soona Lage" from Om Shanti Om, guest-wrote the songs "Lovely" and "Sharabi", which were respectively co-composed by British-Punjabi guest musician Dr Zeus and the guest Bhangra pop group RDB, while director Farah Khan stepped in to write the lyrics for "Nonsense Ki Night" with the duo themselves, who also contributed lyrics to "Sharabi". The music rights were purchased by T-Series for a price of ₹120 million (US$1.97 million). Abhijit Vaghani served as the album co-producer.

== Marketing and release ==
The soundtrack was preceded with the first song "India Waale" which released on 3 September 2014. The second song "Manwa Laage" was released on 10 September. The soundtrack was launched on 24 September at an event held in the outskirts of Film City, Mumbai with the cast and crew participating. The event is hosted by Rithvik Dhanjani and Kunwar Amar, with Vishal–Shekhar and his music team performed the songs live on stage. Besides the musical performance, a magic show was hosted by British-based digital illusionist-magician Keelan Leyser and the cast performing to the song "India Waale". The producers further tied up with Lenovo to showcase its range of Full HD laptop products at the music launch event. The event was aired live on the official YouTube channel of Red Chillies Entertainment.

== Critical reception ==
Kasmin Fernandes at The Times of India felt, "As a heist film centred around a dance competition, Happy New Year provides plenty of fodder for composers Vishal and Shekhar and lyricist Irshad Kamil to showcase their way with sounds. And they've delivered, with seven original tracks, one electronic version, a variation, a medley and an instrumental number." Rohit Vats for Hindustan Times gave the album 3 out of 5 stars stated, "Farah Khan looks more concerned about the feel of her film than the quality of the songs, and it prompts her to go with trendy tunes. Overall, the album is average and is only youth oriented. Acquiring longevity will be difficult for this album."

Rajiv Vijayakar of Bollywood Hungama wrote "Three breezy songs dominate, while 'Lovely' may do well for every short span [...] On a qualitative front, the score is average after the abovementioned winning tracks." Joginder Tuteja of Rediff.com wrote "the Happy New Year soundtrack has quite a few winners". While calling it as a "mixed bag", Devesh Sharma of Filmfare wrote "The composers have stuck closely to director Farah Khan's vision and haven’t experimented much. Knowing Farah, the songs are going to be a visual treat. Can’t wait for SRK and company to wield their magic." Karthik Srinivasan of Milliblog wrote "Less Vishal-Shekhar, lot more Farah Khan, this soundtrack."

== Track listing ==
No.	Title	Singer(s)	Length
1.	"India Waale"	Shankar Mahadevan, K.K., Vishal Dadlani, Neeti Mohan	3:58
2.	"Manwa Laage"	Arijit Singh, Shreya Ghoshal	4:31
3.	"Satakli"	Sukhwinder Singh	3:43
4.	"Lovely (Lyrics :- Kumaar, Co-Composer : Dr Zeus)"	Kanika Kapoor, Fateh Doe, Ravindra Upadhyay, Miraya Varma	3:41
5.	"World Dance Medley"	Neeti Mohan, Vishal Dadlani, Sukhwinder Singh, K.K., Shankar Mahadevan, Shah Rukh Khan	5:23
6.	"Nonsense Ki Night (Lyrics :- Farah Khan, Vishal Dadlani and Shekhar Ravjiani)"	Mika Singh	3:03
7.	"Dance Like A Chammiya"	Sunidhi Chauhan, Vishal Dadlani	3:32
8.	"Sharabi (Lyrics :- Kumaar, NS Chauhan, Vishal Dadlani and Shekhar Ravjiani]]; Co-Composer : RDB feat. Manj Musik and SurjRDB)"	Manj Musik, Nindy Kaur, Vishal Dadlani, Shekhar Ravjiani, JessieK	4:21
9.	"Indiawaale" (Electronic)	Neeti Mohan, Vishal Dadlani, K.K., Shankar Mahadevan	4:26
10.	"The Heist" (Theme)	Instrumental	1:57
11.	"Kamlee (Lyrics :- Kumaar, Co-Composer : Dr Zeus)"	Kanika Kapoor, Ravindra Upadhyay, Miraya Varma, Fateh Doe, Dr Zeus	3:44
Total length:			42:18

== Awards and nominations ==
Award	Category	Recipient(s) and nominee(s)	Result	Ref.
BIG Star Entertainment Awards	Most Entertaining Song	"Lovely"	Nominated	
BIG Star Entertainment Awards	Most Entertaining Singer (Female)	Kanika Kapoor – "Lovely"	Nominated	
Bollywood Hungama Surfers' Choice Music Awards	Best Soundtrack	Vishal–Shekhar	Nominated	
Bollywood Hungama Surfers' Choice Music Awards	Best Female Playback Singer	Kanika Kapoor for "Lovely"	Nominated	
Bollywood Hungama Surfers' Choice Music Awards	Best Song	"Manwa Laage"	Nominated	
Bollywood Hungama Surfers' Choice Music Awards	Best Music Video	"Sharabi"	Nominated	
Filmfare Awards	Best Female Playback Singer	Shreya Ghoshal for "Manwa Laage"	Nominated	
Global Indian Music Academy Awards	Best Duet	Arijit Singh and Shreya Ghoshal – "Manwa Laage"	Nominated	
Mirchi Music Awards	Song of The Year	"Manwa Laage"	Nominated	
Mirchi Music Awards	Male Vocalist of The Year	Arijit Singh – "Manwa Laage"	Nominated	
Mirchi Music Awards	Female Vocalist of The Year	Shreya Ghoshal – "Manwa Laage"	Nominated	
Mirchi Music Awards	Music Composer of The Year	Vishal–Shekhar – "Manwa Laage"	Nominated	
Mirchi Music Awards	Best Song Producer (Programming & Arranging)	Jackie Vanjari – "Manwa Laage"	Nominated	
Mirchi Music Awards	Lyricist of The Year	Irshad Kamil – "Manwa Laage"	Won	
Mirchi Music Awards	Best Song Engineer (Recording & Mixing)	Satchith Harve and Praveen Muralidhar – "Manwa Laage"	Won	
Producers Guild Film Awards	Best Female Playback Singer	Shreya Ghoshal for "Manwa Laage"	Nominated	
Stardust Awards	Best Female Playback Singer	Kanika Kapoor for "Lovely" (Note: Also for "Baby Doll" from Ragini MMS 2)	Won	
Stardust Awards	Best Music Director	Vishal–Shekhar	Nominated	
