= Beach Chair =

Beach Chair may refer to:

- "Beach Chair" (song), a 2006 song by Jay-Z and Chris Martin
- Beach Chair (film test), a 1986 film test by Pixar
- Beach Chair (album), an album by Raaginder
- Deckchair
- Strandkorb
