= Rajasthan Roots =

Collective fusion band

Rajasthan Roots is a collective fusion band consisting of folk musicians from Rajasthan. They create folk and contemporary music.

They use various instruments: Morchang (Jew's harp), Khurtal (Castanets), Algoza (Pungi), Khamaicha (Bowed string instrument), Nagara, Khol, Ektara, Bansuri, Tabla, Tambura and Harmonium. Rajasthan Roots (Aditya Bhasin, Nathoo Lal Solanki,Kutle Khan, Bismillah Khan and Nancy) appeared on the TV music program The Dewarists in 2011 in Jaisalmer, Rajasthan; there they recorded a song named Changing World with Shri and Monica Dogra.
