= The Dewarists =

- Genre: Reality; Documentary
- Starring: Musicians, Artists
- Country of origin: India
- No. of seasons: 5
- No. of episodes: 38

Production
- Producers: Babble Fish Productions; Only Much Louder; Dewar
- Production location: Various Cities across India
- Cinematography: Jay Pinak Oza; Tanay Satam
- Camera setup: multi-camera
- Running time: 20–22 minutes

Original release
- Network: MTV India
- Release: 16 October 2011 – 17 November 2013

The Dewarists is a part music documentary and part travelogue television series on MTV India. The show casts musicians from various parts of the world, collaborating to create original music while travelling across India. The first season featured a total of ten episodes and featured many musicians, including Imogen Heap, Vishal–Shekhar, Zeb and Haniya, Shantanu Moitra, Swanand Kirkire, Indian Ocean, Mohit Chauhan, Parikrama, Agnee, Shilpa Rao, Shri, Monica Dogra, Rajasthan Roots, Papon, Rabbi Shergill, Shubha Mudgal, Swarathma, MIDIval Punditz, Humble the Poet, Karsh Kale, Baiju Dharmajan, Njeralathu Harigovindan, Raghu Dixit and Rewben Mashangva.

The first season was directed by Vishwesh Krishnamoorthy, an ad filmmaker and frontman of the Mumbai Hardcore band, Scribe, with the first five episodes also involving UK filmmakers, Fred and Nick. The show is hosted by actor-singer Monica Dogra. The theme music of The Dewarists was written by Raghu Dixit.

In 2013, for the launch of a new season of The Dewarists, the creators of the program altered the format of the show to move away from music-inspired journeys and expanded it to include collaborations between musicians and visual artists from India and around the world. Directed by independent film-maker, Srinivas Sunderrajan, the show was broadcast on MTV India in its new format that merges the visual arts with sound to create a multi-sensory experience. The show was also the first collaborative experience to be simulcast on television and on YouTube. Singer Monica Dogra returned as hostess, and also one of the collaborators on the season premiere of The Dewarists season 3.

== Season 1 (2011) ==
=== Episode 1 – Minds Without Fear ===
This was filmed in Samode Palace and Jaipur in Rajasthan, where Imogen Heap and Vishal Dadlani recorded the song Minds Without Fear, which is inspired by Rabindranath Tagore's poem "Where the Mind is without Fear".

=== Episode 2 – Kya Khayaal Hai ===
This was filmed at the legendary Capitol theatre in Mumbai, where Shantanu Moitra, Swanand Kirkire and the Pakistani duo Zeb and Haniya teamed up and recorded the song Kya Khayaal Hai.

=== Episode 3 – Maaya ===
This was filmed in Delhi with Indian Ocean and Mohit Chauhan. The song Maaya was performed at venue called Garden of Five Senses in New Delhi.

=== Episode 4 – I Believe ===
This was filmed in Pune with Parikrama, Agnee and Shilpa Rao. The song I Believe was recorded at Shisha Café.

=== Episode 5 – Changing World ===
This was filmed in Jaisalmer with Shri, Monica Dogra and Rajasthan Roots. The song Changing World was recorded.

=== Episode 6 – Khule Da Rabb ===
This was filmed in Kaziranga. Assam worked with Papon and Rabbi Shergill to record the song Khule Da Rabb.

=== Episode 7 – Duur Kinara ===
This was filmed in Mysore, Shubha Mudgal. Swarathma recorded the song Duur Kinara.

=== Episode 8 – No I.D. Required ===
This was filmed in Goa, Monica Dogra. MIDIval Punditz and Sikh-Canadian Humble the Poet recorded the song No I.D. Required.

=== Episode 9 – Sacred Science ===
This was filmed in Angadipuram. Kerala, Karsh Kale, Baiju Dharmajan and Njeralathu Harigovindan recorded the song Sacred Science.

=== Episode 10 – Masti Ki Basti ===
This was filmed in Shillong, Meghalaya. Raghu Dixit and Rewben Mashangva, known as The King of Naga Folk Blues, recorded the song Masti Ki Basti.

== Season 2 (2012) ==
=== Episode 1 – Let Go ===
The episode features the emotive acoustics of British singer-songwriter Fin Greenall and the soulful voice of Shafqat Amanat Ali Khan from Pakistan. They experience Mumbai through the eyes of their hosts Salim-Sulaiman, the prolific Bollywood composer duo.

=== Episode 2 – Tom, Dick & Harry ===
In this episode Akala and Piyush Mishra come together. Akala, who is a rapper, poet, teacher and journalist joins forces with Piyush Mishra, who is celebrated for working across many creative fields. Together Akala and Piyush Mishra present a piece that was filmed in the Andaman and Nicobar Islands.

=== Episode 3 – Today ===
This episode features Shaa'ir + Func and La Pongal. They create a high octane folktronica. This episode was shot in Chennai.

=== Episode 4 – Make Love ===
This episode features Thermal and a Quarter, Adil & Vasundhara, with their bluesy rhythms and Ashwin Srinivasan on flutes. This episode was shot at Bangalore.

=== Episode 5 – Gypsy ===
This episode features Anoushka Shankar on sitar, Sanjeev Shankar on shehnai, and Pirashanna Thevarajah on percussion. This episode was filmed in New Delhi.

=== Episode 6 – Altitude ===
This episode features the fusion band Advaita and Electronica artist Dualist Inquiry. This episode was shot in Shimla.

=== Episode 7 – Qutub Minar ===
The song tells a (fictional) story of a man who decides to relocate the monument of Qutub Minar from Delhi to Imphal. It features singer and songwriter Akhu, who collaborates with the Asian Dub Foundation.

=== Episode 8 – Bangla Bass ===
In this episode, American rapper Brooklyn Shanti and Indian actor-musician Mou Sultana create a track with DJ Nucleya about the city Kolkata.

=== Episode 9 – Maati ===
In this episode, award-winning percussionist Trilok Gurtu teams up with electronic folk duo Hari + Sukhmani in their hometown of Chandigarh. Maati is an ambient folk song that is set to the poetry of 18th century Sufi poet Bulleh Shah. The song has been given a range of sounds thanks to the percussive genius of Trilok Gurtu.

=== Episode 10 – The Minstrel's Tale ===
Papon and Karsh Kale, from Season 1, come together with Carl Barat (from The Libertines and Dirty Pretty Things) for the season's finale. This is the first Dewarists episode shot outside India, in Aberfeldy, Scotland. It also features a trip to the Dewars distillery plant.

== Season 3 (2013) ==
=== Episode 1 – Suspended ===
This episode features Monica Dogra of indie rock outfit, Shaair+Func a photographer and light specialist, Eric Paré, and Prashant Mistry of one of UK's electro bass outfits, Engine-EarZ Experiment. This is the first episode of the new season of The Dewarists and explores the theme of duality. Set in the snow-capped hills of Manali, the music video, Suspended, was a stirring amalgamation of light painting and electronic music.

=== Episode 2 – Khirama ===
The second episode of the third season enabled the coming together of indie-pop icon Lucky Ali and renowned installation artist, Shilpa Gupta. Toying with the idea of the loss of identity in a big city like Mumbai, Lucky Ali created the tune he wanted to go with, while Shilpa Gupta worked to write the lyrics. For the final music video, Khirama, Lucky and Shilpa used words as both lyric and art, ultimately giving a whole new meaning to the song produced.

=== Episode 3 – Aaina ===
Intrigued by the story behind the creation of the urban jungle that is Mumbai, our collaborators – hand shadowgrapher Amar Sen, and audio-visual collective B.L.O.T., decided to showcase the creations of the island city, ranging from its colonial past to the city of today. Their collaboration, Aaina, uses Amar Sen's shadow work and B.L.O.T.'s light projections to tell the story visually. Suryakant Sawhney, from Peter Car Recording Co., provides vocals to complement the visuals.

=== Episode 4 – Hadimba ===
The fertile, grassy slopes of Manali play host to the fourth collaboration of Season Three of The Dewarists. The collaborators are: Lagori, a highly energetic folk fusion band from Bengaluru, and Actor's Cult, a theatre group from Mumbai. The outcome of their collaboration is the high-octane song that inspires awe and fervor.

=== Episode 5 – Kwamakhutha ===
Jayachandran Palazhy, founder of the Attakkalari Centre For Movement Arts, and his dance troupe are joined by Delhi-based hind-rock band Euphoria. Set by the tranquil shores of Pondicherry, the collaboration fuses contemporary movement arts with the effortless energy of Euphoria.

=== Episode 6 – The Journey ===
The sixth episode on The Dewarists this season looked back upon the collaborations where music and art met to create a multi-sensory experience. Monica Dogra accompanied viewers through the diverse locales where each artist worked to create art that inspired those around it.

=== Episode 7 – I ===
The one-hour-long season finale featured a collaboration between India's folk rock collective, The Raghu Dixit Project; a contemporary dance troupe, Nritarutya; mask maker, Sridhar Murthy; and graffiti artist and animator, Harun Robert. Set in Bangalore, the music video produced was a blend of diverse art forms, genres, mediums, and styles.

== Season 4 (2015) ==
=== Episode 1 – Yaad ===
'Yaad' the first episode of the fourth season of The Dewarists unfolds with a collaboration of American clarinetist and music composer Shankar Tucker, and gifted vocalist Nirali Kartik. Inspired by one of the subcontinent's greatest Urdu poets: Faiz – whose poetry still speaks to those hoping for love. They try to recreate the words of Faiz in a melodious tribute to both the poet and the poem ‘Kab Yaad Mein Tera'. The track reflects the individual styles of the artists, the mood of the mellifluous raga, and the mysteries of longing and separation.

=== Episode 2 – Fakiri ===
In the Second episode of Season Four, we see Vishal Dadlani Collaborating with Neeraj Arya’s Kabir Cafe to create the song ==Fakiri' which is neither betwixt nor between.but the song is inspired by both Kabir’s life, and his poem ‘Lago Mere Yaar Fakiri’, which is about letting go.

=== Episode 3 – Daiyya Ri ===
In the third episode of The Dewarists season four, the Raghu Dixit Project and Bindhumalini travel to Rajasthan.They find inspiration from a local poets’ community, Chang, from the Prince of Alsisar Mahal, and Abhimanyu Singh. This inspiration from the local poets and the surreal beauty of Alsisar Mahal leads our Dewarists to do magic with the colorful words of Amir Khusrow, in ‘Daiyya Ri’, a poem written to express his love of his pir.

=== Episode 4 – O Megh ===
Kashmir bears witness to the fourth collaboration of this season, where Shantanu Moitra and Papon create a song inspired by Rabindranath Tagore’s poem, ‘O Megh’ — a tribute to a child's imagination and his dilemma at leaving his mother behind while he's tempted to go and play with clouds and waves. In Kashmir, they meet local poets who introduce them to local traditions via Bhand Pather's performance. As our Dewarists jam together, the poem takes them back to the memories of the time they spent with their parents back home.

=== Episode 5 – Recap ===
From shadowgraphy to installation art *The Dewarists* has explored ideas beyond the ordinary. *The Dewarists* has brought artists together to create collaborations. This episode takes viewers back, to a time when art and poetry came together to complement the works of *The Dewarists*.

=== Episode 6 – Heer ===
For the season 4 finale Nucleya and Shruti Pathak travel to the land of the beautiful blue waters, Phuket, Thailand, to find a tune for the words of our Poet Dewarist Waris Shah. Shruti Pathak, best known as the voice behind songs like 'Mar Jawaan' (Fashion), and 'Subharambh' (Kai Po Che), has been on tours all over the country promoting her band 'Guzzler' and launched 'Guzzler' as a radio show. Nucleya redefines Indian electronica by creating a fusion of complex cut up edits and unheard Indian sounds with cutting-edge production and genre-defying rhythms. While they explore the islands, Nucleya comes up with a basic melody and they work further on the track. He is helped by his producer friend, Dub Sharma, to write some lyrics inspired by Heer. Nucleya. They also meet a group of local Thai folk musicians who perform local folk songs that have been sung for years and have been passed on from one generation to another. Nucleya also tries his hand at playing a local Thai instrument, Ranad. The Dewarists discuss the poems of Waris Shah, also popularly known as William Shakespeare of India for his most famous work, Heer Ranjha. Waris Shah's poem is much more than just a love story; it is also about a man's search for, and tenuous relationship with, his creator.

== Season 5 (2016) ==
=== Episode 1 – Yaad Rakh ===
The fifth season of The Dewarists opens with Benny Dayal and Naezy and the differences in their backgrounds have shaped how each of them creates music. This episode highlights Benny Dayal’s experience as a playback singer and shows how Naezy uses rap to tell stories, about Naezy’s life the people Naezy meets and the places Naezy visits.

=== Episode 2 – Ikka Dukka ===
In Episode 2 of The Dewarists, Clinton Cerejo, Bianca Gomes and Deepak Ramola travel through the landscapes of Ladakh. They are surrounded by mountains and peaceful monasteries. They find inspiration for Ikka Dukka, a song that reflects their search for something. The song is about their search for something. The song is about their search for something. The song is about their search, for something.

=== Episode 3 – Dil Beparvah ===
In the episode of The Dewarists Ankur Tewari and Prateek Kuhad create Dil Beparvah in Shillong. The song explores the idea of following your heart and pursuing your dreams. The episode also features their appearance, at The Dewarists Stage at the Bacardi NH7 Weekender.

=== Episode 4 – Mitho Laage ===
In episode four, we take you to the magical palaces of Udaipur, where Dhruv Ghanekar and Mame Khan bring their passion for music alive. Divided by cultures and musical backgrounds, these Dewarists unite to tell you their LIVE TRUE tale with Mitho Laage.

=== Episode 5 – Memories ===
Immersed in the beauty and serenity of Hampi, Nucleya and Papon converge on a journey steeped in passion. In episode five, they create a sound that is set in the present and inspired by the echoes of the past. Watch their LIVE TRUE journey weave ancient history and soulful music together with electronic beats in Memories.

=== Episode 6 – Panchiyaa ===
In the final episode of The Dewarists this season, watch Amit Trivedi and V Selvaganesh sail through the serene seas of Sri Lanka on a journey to LIVE TRUE with Panchiyaa. While exploring the idea of someone who loves being in love, they set out to create something as pure and soulful as the scenic views around them.

== See also ==
- Thomas Dewar
- Music genre
- Music of India
- Hindustani classical music
- Indian musical instruments
