= East Rain =

2005 studio album by Shri

Studio album by Shri
- Released: 2005
- Recorded: 2005
- Genre: Drum n Bass
- Label: Drum the Bass
- Producer: Shri

Shri chronology
| Drum the Bass (1997) | East Rain (2005) | Seven Steps (2007) |

East Rain is the second solo album by London-based drum and bass artist Shri, released in 2005 by Drum the Bass.

== Track listing ==
1. "Appa2"
2. "Heavy World"
3. "East Rain"
4. "Lifecycle"
5. "Tarana"
6. "Di Floris"
7. "Watching"
8. "Mela"
9. "Ethni-City"
10. "Strange"
11. "A Piece of Peace"
