= Badmarsh & Shri =

English electronic dance music duo

- Origin: London, England
- Genres: EDM
- Years active: 1998–present
- Members: DJ Mohammed Akber Ali; Shrikanth Sriram

Badmarsh & Shri are an English electronic dance music duo from London. The pair consists of DJ Mohammed Akber Ali, a.k.a. Badmarsh, who was born in Yemen, and tabla player Shrikanth Sriram, a.k.a. Shri, who is from India. They have released two albums to date.

== History ==
Prior to the group's formation, Badmarsh (whose name means "rascal" in Hindi) worked at the reggae studio Easy Street, which was hiring PA equipment to a nightclub called Labyrinth. After a visit to Labyrinth, Badmarsh became interested in DJing, and almost immediately went out to buy turntables and records. He later secured a residency position at the club, where he remained for five years. Shri, on the other hand, had spent five years touring with Nitin Sawhney, who later produced his debut solo album, Drum the Bass.

The duo came together through Shabs, head of Outcaste Records, who thought that the pair's individually different sounds would complement each other in a group.

=== Dancing Drums ===
Badmarsh & Shri released their debut album, Dancing Drums, in 1998. It incorporated a mix of drum and bass, hip hop, Indian classical music, and jazz.

AllMusic rated the album 4 out of 5 stars, praising Shri's melodic basslines and strong tabla rhythms, and concluded that "Several tracks go on a couple of minutes too long, and techno snobs will find its pleasantness objectionable. Overall, though, this album is a success."

=== Signs ===
In 2001, Badmarsh & Shri released their second album, Signs, originally called Tribal through Outcaste Records. A continuation of their "musical migration", the record, co-produced by Mike Spencer, was a blend of dance floor music and a more sensuous, chilled style.

We wanted to make music that moved you on the dance floor as well as at home. Everything had to be emotive, whether it made you angry or made you swoon. But it also had to funk. We wanted it to be about feeling rather than thinking - that was our vision,"

— Badmarsh and Shri

The duo drew their inspiration from their respective backgrounds of dancehall and hip hop, as well as funk, Latin, and African rhythms. They also made use of strings, synthesizers, and flute, along with the vocals of UK Apache.

The title track from Signs was featured in the closing credits of the thriller film Battle in Seattle. It also charted at No. 63 on the UK Singles Chart.

== Discography ==
- Dancing Drums (1998)
- Signs (2001)
