= Fan (soundtrack) =

- Soundtrack album cover

Soundtrack album by Vishal–Shekhar
- Released: 29 February 2016
- Recorded: 2016
- Studio: YRF Studios, Mumbai
- Genre: Feature film soundtrack
- Length: 35:04
- Language: Hindi
- Label: YRF Music
- Producer: Vishal–Shekhar

Vishal–Shekhar chronology
Happy New Year (2014)	Fan (2016)	Sultan (2016)

Singles from Fan
- 1. "Jabra Fan" Released: 1 February 2016

Fan is the soundtrack album to the 2016 film of the same name directed by Maneesh Sharma and produced by Aditya Chopra starring Shah Rukh Khan in dual roles as film star Aryan Khanna and his obsessive fan Gaurav Chandna. Being a songless film, the album featured a promotional song "Jabra Fan" that was released as a single on 1 February 2016; the soundtrack accompanied multiple versions of "Jabra Fan" in different languages, which was released on 29 February under YRF Music label.

== Background ==
Unlike Sharma's previous films, which had music integral to the story, Fan was a songless film. It was made as such as he wanted to give the audience a new experience, and refrained the use of songs that would hamper the story. However, he wanted Gaurav to have a fun dance number, resulting in a promotional song that would not feature in the film. The duo Vishal–Shekhar composed the song "Jabra Fan" for the film, which had lyrics written by Varun Grover and sung by Nakash Aziz. It was recorded at the YRF Studios in Mumbai, during early 2016.

A. R. Rahman was initially roped in to compose the background score of the film. But due to reasons unknown, he opted out. The film was eventually scored by Italian composer Andrea Guerra, who did the same for YRF's Dum Laga Ke Haisha (2015).

== Release ==
The song "Jabra Fan" was released as a single on 1 February 2016. It was further accompanied by a music video featuring Khan as Gaurav, dancing in the streets of Delhi. The soundtrack was released on 29 February 2016 and included 13 tracks, with one theme music featured in the trailer and 12 songs, which were each different versions of "Jabra Fan". The song was released in 9 Indian languages sung by regional singers, 2 foreign languages sung by foreign singers, and a mashup version of "Jabra Fan", which is a remix version of all the 11 languages.

== Controversy ==
Despite the song "Jabra Fan" being stated as a promotional number, a suit was filed against Yash Raj Films by complainant Afreen Fatima Zaidi at the National Consumer Disputes Redressal Commission in 2021, who stated that she had been disappointed on the song being excluded. The complainant also demanded ₹10,000 as a compensation from the makers. The Supreme Court of India, however, set aside the order claiming that the company was not liable for the song's exclusion and no unfair trade practice happened.

== Track listing ==
No.	Title	Lyrics	Music	Singer(s)	Length
1.	"Jabra Fan" (Hindi)	Varun Grover	Vishal–Shekhar	Nakash Aziz	03:43
2.	"Ghaint Fan" (Punjabi)	Shellee	Vishal–Shekhar	Harbhajan Mann	03:28
3.	"Byapok Fan" (Bengali)	Priyo Chattopadhyay	Vishal–Shekhar	Anupam Roy	03:28
4.	"Jabardast Fan" (Bhojpuri)	Ranju Sinha	Vishal–Shekhar	Manoj Tiwari	03:28
5.	"Jabro Fan" (Gujarati)	Roshan Thakar	Vishal–Shekhar	Arvind Vegda	03:28
6.	"Jabraa Fan" (Marathi)	Guru Thakur	Vishal–Shekhar	Avadhoot Gupte	03:28
7.	"Takkara Fan" (Tamil)	B. Vijay	Vishal–Shekhar	Nakash Aziz	03:28
8.	"Veera Fan" (Telugu)	Chaitanya Prasad	Vishal–Shekhar	Nakash Aziz	03:28
9.	"Jabar Fan" (Odia)	Varun Grover	Vishal–Shekhar	Biebhukishore	03:28
10.	"Jabara Fan" (Arabic)	Varun Grover	Vishal–Shekhar	Grini	03:28
11.	"Lokuma Fan" (Sinhala)	Manuranga Wijesekera	Vishal–Shekhar	Infaas Nooruddin	03:28
12.	"Fan Anthem" (11-language Mashup)	YRF Music Ft. Various Artists	Vishal–Shekhar	YRF Music Ft Various Artists	02:49
13.	"Fan Theme" (Official Trailer Music)		Andrea Guerra	Instrumental	02:40
Total length:					35:04

== Accolades ==
Award (Note: Awards, festivals and organizations are in alphabetical order.)	Date of ceremony (Note: Date is linked to the article about the awards held that year, wherever possible.)	Category	Recipient(s)	Result	Ref.
Mirchi Music Awards	18 February 2017	Best Song Producer (Programming & Arranging)	Sourav Roy – (for "Jabra Fan")	Nominated	
Mirchi Music Awards	18 February 2017	Best Song Engineer (Recording & Mixing)	Vijay Dayal – (for "Jabra Fan")	Won	
Stardust Awards	21 December 2016	Best Male Playback Singer	Nakash Aziz – (for "Jabra Fan")	Nominated	
