= The Stage (TV series) =

- Genre: Talent show
- Created by: Kamna Nirula Menezes
- Presented by: Shibani Dandekar
- Judges: See below
- Country of origin: India
- Original language: English
- No. of seasons: 3
- No. of episodes: 48

Production
- Producer: Kamna Nirula Menezes
- Production locations: Mumbai, Maharashtra, India
- Camera setup: Multi-camera
- Production company: SOL Productions

Original release
- Network: Colors Infinity
- Release: 10 October 2015 – 7 December 2017

The Stage is an Indian talent television series, season 1 of which premiered on 10 October 2015 and broadcasts on Colors Infinity. The show airs on Saturday and Sunday nights. The series is produced by Kamna Nirula Menezes of SOL Productions. The series is India's first-ever homegrown English singing talent hunt show. All three seasons have been presented by Shibani Dandekar while Vishal Dadlani, Monica Dogra, Ehsaan Noorani, and Devraj Sanyal judge. Yatharth Ratnum was declared the winner of the first season. The second season was bagged by Sharvi Yadav. The third season was won by Siddhant Sharma.

== Host ==
- Shibani Dandekar

== Judges ==
- Vishal Dadlani
- Monica Dogra
- Ehsaan Noorani
- Devraj Sanyal
