= Beach Chair (album) =

Studio album by Raaginder
- Released: October 29, 2014
- Recorded: 2013–2014
- Genres: Hip-hop, bhangra, classical, world
- Length: 40:47
- Label: Raaginder
- Producers: JumpinGenres, Sodhivine, Sango, Deep Dolla$, Raaginder

Raaginder chronology
Take One... (2011)	''Beach Chair'' (2014)	escape (2017)

Singles from Beach Chair
- 1. "Dholna Ve (Feat. Tina Mann)" Released: October 31, 2013; 2. "Raindrops" Released: March 18, 2014; 3. "Bonfire/Coastin' (Feat. Sodhivine & KinG!)" Released: October 29, 2014

Beach Chair is the debut studio album by Indian-American violinist and producer Raaginder formerly known as Violinder. It was released October 29, 2014, independently. The album features guest appearances from vocalist Tina Mann, Fateh, Raxstar, Marcus Orelias, KinG!, Sodhivine and Surjit Singh Bawa. The production was mainly handled by Raaginder with the addition of JumpinGenres, Deep Dolla$, Sodhivine and Sango.

== Background ==
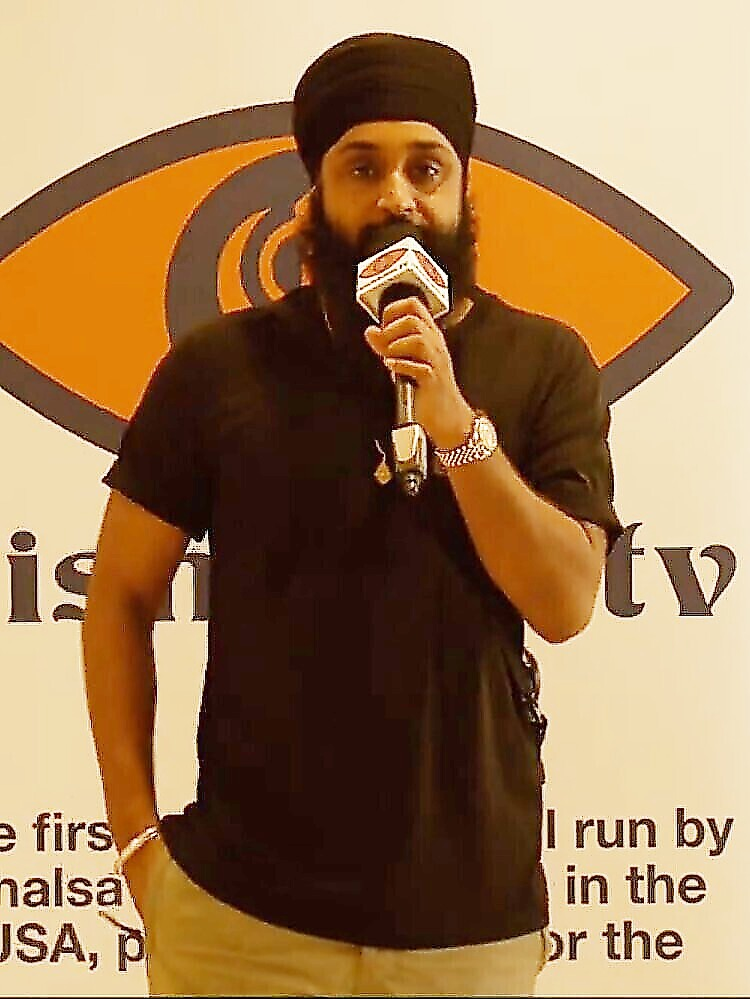
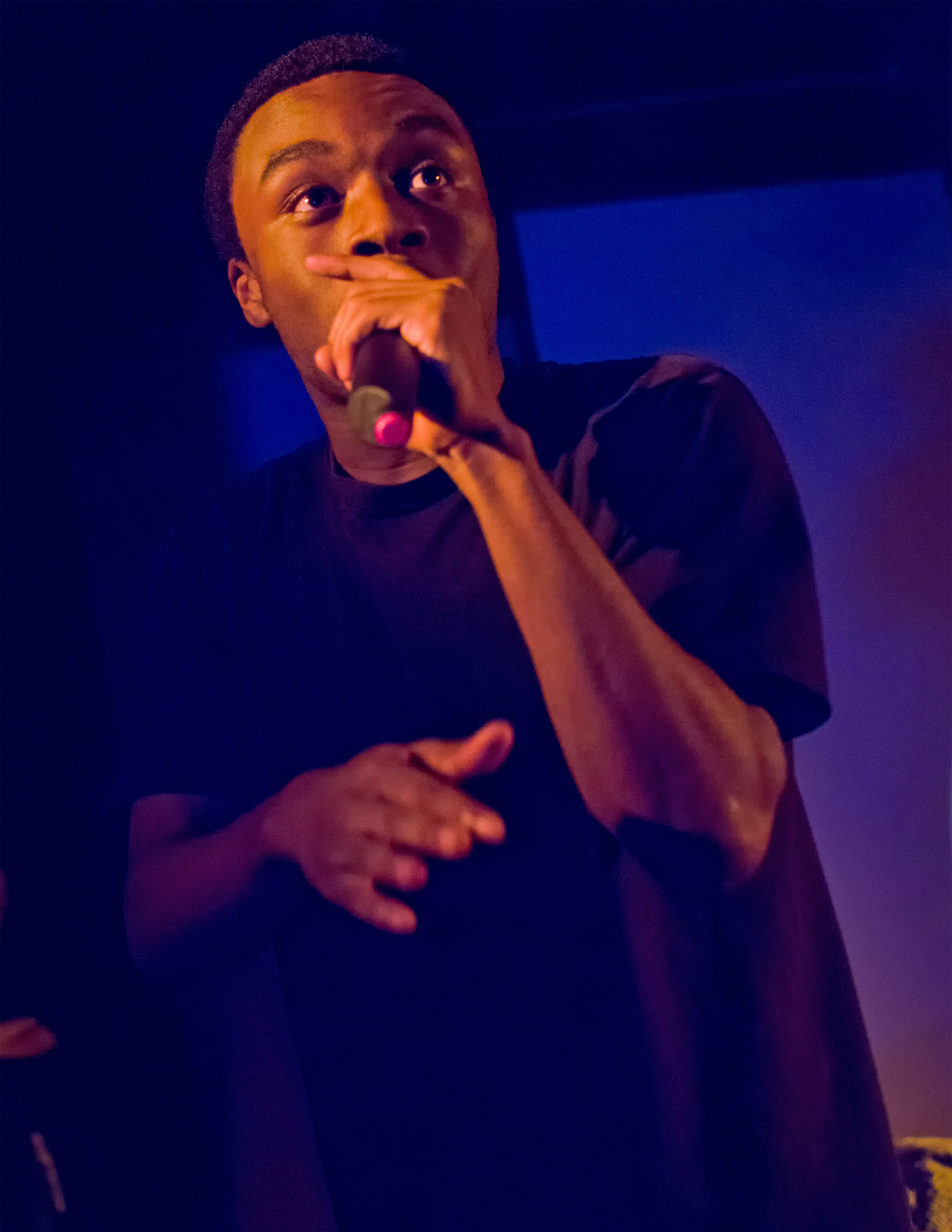
Beach Chair features recording artist, Fateh (left) and Marcus Orelias (right).

Following the 2011 mixtape release Take One..., Raaginder then still using the moniker "Violinder" began to work on new music that wasn't "cover music" but originally composed and produced. Raaginder stated " It was the first time, I displayed my music productions and original compositions on a body of work". The album's title was inspired by the Jay Z song "Beach Chair". The lead single "Dholna Ve" featuring Tina Mann was released on October 31, 2013. and was succeeded with "Raindrops" a tribute to Raaginder's mother, who died in April during the recording process and the single featured on The Times of India, "Bonfire/Coastin" featuring Sodhivine and KinG! a few months later on October 29, 2014. Due to a last minute addition the album was supposed to release on October 27, 2014, but was pushed back to October 29, 2014. On October 28, a day before the albums release via Twitter, Momi teased the tracklist.

== Track listing ==
Beach Chair
No.	Title	Writer(s)	Producer(s)	Length
1.	"Depth" (Feat. JumpinGenres)	Raginder Momi, Ajay Randhawa	JumpinGenres	2:27
2.	"Bonfire" (Feat. Sodhivine)	Momi, Naanak Sodhi	Sodhivine	4:12
3.	"Dholna Ve" (Feat. Tina Mann)	Momi, Tina Mann	Deep Dolla$	3:49
4.	"Free"	Momi	Raaginder	3:20
5.	"Layback" (Feat. Raxstar)	Momi, Rakesh Bera	Raaginder	3:34
6.	"Hallucination" (Feat. Surjit Singh Bawa)	Momi, Surjit Singh Bawa	Raaginder	1:24
7.	"Beach Chair" (Feat. Marcus Orelias)	Momi, Marcus Orelias	Raaginder	4:37
8.	"Coastin'" (Feat. KinG!)	Momi, Sherwin Keith Rice II	Raaginder	1:23
9.	"Raindrops"	Momi	Sango	3:45
10.	"Breeze"	Momi	Raaginder	4:52
11.	"Bounce" (Feat. Fateh)	Momi, Fateh Singh	Raaginder	2:18
Total length:				40:47

== Personnel ==
=== Notes ===
- JumpinGenres (track 1) – production
- Sodhivine (track 2) – production
- Deep Dolla$ (track 3) – production
- Raaginder (tracks 3–8, 10, 11) – production
- Sodhivine (track 9) – production
- Surjit Singh Bawa (track 6) – drums
- Tina Mann (track 3) – vocals
- Raxstar (track 5) – vocals
- Marcus Orelias (track 7) – vocals; sample arrangement
- KinG! (track 8) – vocals
- Fateh (track 11) – vocals
- Jeff Jackson (track 7) – Mixing engineer

=== Sample credits ===
- "Depth" contains a sample of "Beach Chair" written and performed by Raaginder featuring Marcus Orelias.
- "Beach Chair" contains inserts from the series Mad Men performed by Jon Hamm as Don Draper and January Jones as Betty Draper.
