= Monica Dogra =

American actress

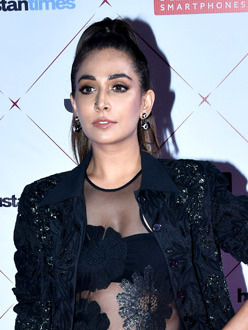
- Dogra at the HT Style Awards in 2018
- Born: Olney, Maryland, United States
- Education: New York University (B.A., Musical Theatre)
- Occupations: Musician, actress
- Years active: 2006–present
- Website: www.monicadogra.com

Monica Dogra is an American musician and actress. She has acted in six feature films, as well as released five studio albums with the band Shaa’ir and Func. She is a member on the judging panel of India's first English music talent show, The Stage. She hosted four seasons of the music-Docu series The Dewarists that was nominated for a Cannes Lion. She also worked on the Viceland Emmy nominated series Woman produced by Gloria Steinem.

== Early life ==
Monica Dogra is the daughter of Dogra Hindu immigrants from Jammu. Her maternal uncle is Dogri folk music singer Prakash Sharma. She grew up in Baltimore, Maryland. She attended Oakleigh Elementary School, Montessori and Dulaney High School. She attended New York University, graduating with a bachelor's degree in musical theatre.

== Career ==
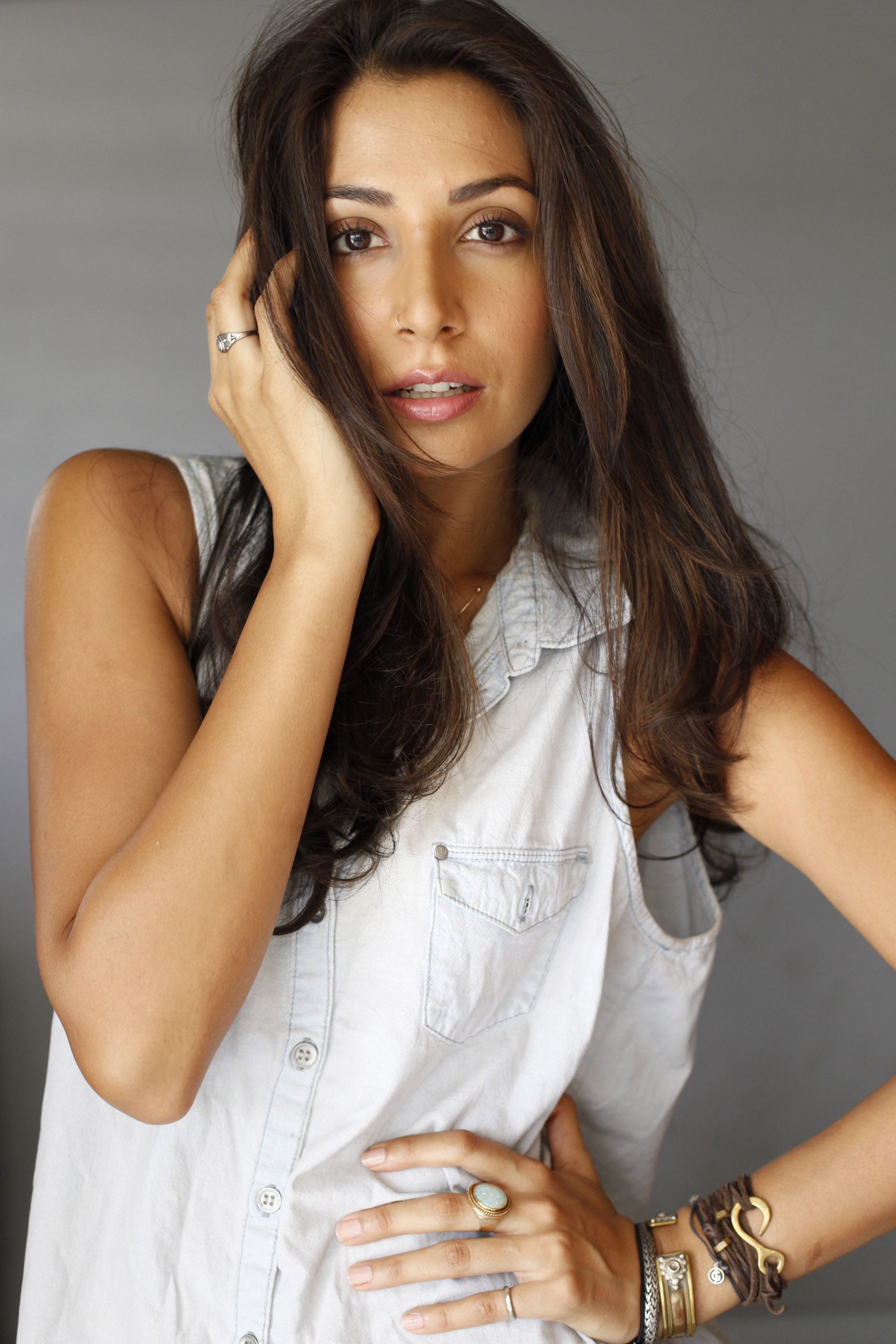
Dogra in 2012

In 2005, she formed the electronic rock group "Shaa'ir+Func", along with guitarist Randolph Correia. In 2007, they released their first album New Day: The Love Album, followed by Light Tribe in 2008 and Mantis in 2010. She also sang a song "Dooriyan Bhi Hai Zaroori" with Vishal Dadlani in the film Break Ke Baad and the theme song in English (with Shahid Mallya) for the film Inkaar.

She made her acting debut with a guest appearance in Rock On!!. In 2008, she was approached by Kiran Rao for the lead role in Rao's directorial debut film Dhobi Ghat - a role Dogra initially turned down, but eventually accepted. In December 2011, she served as a judge for Rolling Stone's Never Hide Sounds musical talent contest. She is the host of The Dewarists, a musical collaborative show on STAR World India. In 2013, she performed with award-winning violinist Scott Tixier, for a series of shows sponsored by Dos Equis around the US.

In March 2014, she was featured on the cover page of FHM Magazine. In March 2013 and May 2015, she was featured on the cover and had a pictorial in Maxim India Magazine.

In 2020 she was one of the judges for the show The Stage alongside Vishal Dadlani.

Monica Dogra acted in the web series The Married Woman, directed by Sahir Raza. The cast also includes Ridhi Dogra in lead role and Nadira Babbar.

== Filmography ==
Year	Title	Role	Notes
2008	Rock On!!	Shaair	Singer
2011	Dhobi Ghat	Shai	
2013	David	Noor	
2014	Fireflies	Michelle	
2015	The Spectacular Jihad of Taz Rahim	Sabrina Jiwan	
2016	Teraa Surroor	Elle Jordan, Tara Wadia's lawyer	
2016	Relapse	Herself	Short film
2020	What Are the Odds	Herself	Netflix

== Television series ==
Year	Title	Role	Other notes
2021	The Married Woman	Peeplika Khan	ALTBalaji
2021	Cartel	Maya	ALTBalaji and MX Player
2023	Saas, Bahu Aur Flamingo	DJ Naina	Disney+ Hotstar

== Music video appearances ==
Year	Title	Artist	Ref.
2016	"Lay You Down"	DJ Nanok	

== Discography ==
Year	Title	Band/Solo
2006	New Day: The Love Album	Shaair and Func
2008	Light Tribe	Shaair and Func
2010	Mantis	Shaair and Func
2010	"Dooriyan"	For Bollywood movie Break Ke Baad composed by Vishal–Shekhar
2011	"Lover"	Bandish Projekt
2012	Changing World	Rajasthan Roots and Shri
2013	"Inkaar Theme (English Version)"	Inkaar by Shamir Tandon
2014	Re:cover	Shaair and Func
2014	Align	Shaair and Func
2016	Spit	Shaair and Func

== Television ==
Year	Show	Role	Result
2015	The Stage	Judge	
2017	Fear Factor: Khatron Ke Khiladi 8	Contestant	Finalist (4th Place)
