= The Remix (TV series) =

- Judges: Sunidhi Chauhan; Amit Trivedi; Nucleya
- Country of origin: India
- Original language: Hindi
- No. of seasons: 1
- No. of episodes: 10

Production
- Running time: ~60 minutes
- Production company: Greymatter Entertainment

Original release
- Network: Amazon Prime Video
- Release: 9 March 2018

The Remix is an Indian reality competition television series. It is an Amazon Prime Video original series and premiered on 9 March 2018. Hosted by Karan Tacker, the show is a music challenge where musicians remix Bollywood songs and they are judged by Sunidhi Chauhan, Amit Trivedi and Nucleya.

The show was won by singer-songwriter Rashmeet Kaur and producer Su Real.

== Episodes ==
No.	Title	Original release date
1	"Best Foot Forward"	9 March 2018
2	"Movie Title Track"	9 March 2018
3	"Featuring Live Instruments"	16 March 2018
4	"Love"	23 March 2018
5	"Found Sound"	30 March 2018
6	"Guest Performers"	6 April 2018
7	"Retro Remixes"	13 April 2018
8	"Judges Challenge + Medley"	20 April 2018
9	"Sound of Nation + Global Beats"	27 April 2018
10	"Grand Finale"	4 May 2018
