= Sultan (soundtrack) =

Soundtrack album by Vishal–Shekhar
- Released: 8 June 2016
- Recorded: 2016
- Studio: YRF Studios, Mumbai
- Genre: Feature film soundtrack
- Length: 1:00:57
- Language: Hindi
- Label: YRF Music
- Producer: Aditya Chopra

Vishal–Shekhar chronology
| Fan (2016) | Sultan (2016) | Akira (2016) |

Sultan is the soundtrack to the 2016 film of the same name directed by Ali Abbas Zafar, starring Salman Khan and Anushka Sharma. The soundtrack featured musical score composed by Vishal–Shekhar while the lyrics are penned by Irshad Kamil. It was released by YRF Music on 8 June 2016.

== Development ==
Vishal–Shekhar collaborated with both Salman and Zafar for the first time and also with Yash Raj Films after eight years since Bachna Ae Haseeno (2008). The duo got only a basic outline which is "a moving love story of two wrestlers set in Haryana" and researched a lot on Haryanvi music, with a folklore called raagini. Some outputs on their research were provided from their studio's watchman who was from Haryana. The duo went with stated that Zafar helped them on composing and also mixed raagini with rock to make the sounds more unique for dance numbers.

While recording the score at YRF Studios, the duo worked on the composition at a room without internet connection so that they would not be disturbed. They further refrained to use same singers for other track, which Dadlani admitted that "we do make an effort to counter-cast singers — like if a song suits one singer, we deliberately use a different voice so that it sounds fresh".

The duo admitted that Salman's onscreen performance in the dance and party numbers, had a "certain sort of flair and swag" which they maintained throughout the album. It also served as the inspiration for composing the track "Baby Ko Bass Pasand Hai". Dadlani derived the particular hook line while Irshad Kamil penned down rest of the lyrics. They further attributed that Salman did not make any changes in the songs and heard all of them after they were curated and composed.

Two songs: "Jag Ghoomeya" and "Bulleya" were considered to be the "soul of the album", while the former being a "nostalgic song" about love that had similarities with "Lambi Judaai" by Laxmikant–Pyarelal from Hero (1983), the latter is a qawwali number on unrequited love. The duo composed the tune for "Jag Ghoomeya" within few minutes. The original song was performed by Arijit Singh, but his version was scrapped after Salman's instruction and the song was later performed by Rahat Fateh Ali Khan. This was due to Singh allegedly insulted Salman at an awards ceremony in 2014.

== Release ==
The soundtrack was led with the only song "Baby Ko Bass Pasand Hai" that released as a single on 2 June 2016. The album was released on 8 June 2016. Post-release, Salman Khan performed his rendition of the first four tracks, that were released separately on 14 June 2016, while the bonus track "Raula Paye Gaya" which was sung by Rahat Fateh Ali Khan and the transgender pop group 6 Pack Band was released on 2 July 2016.

== Track listing ==
| No. | Title | Singer(s) | Length |
|---|---|---|---|
| 1. | "Baby Ko Bass Pasand Hai" | Vishal Dadlani, Shalmali Kholgade, Ishita, Badshah | 4:13 |
| 2. | "Jag Ghoomeya" (Male) | Rahat Fateh Ali Khan | 4:42 |
| 3. | "440 Volt" | Mika Singh | 4:28 |
| 4. | "Sultan" (Title Track) | Sukhwinder Singh, Shadab Faridi | 4:40 |
| 5. | "Sachi Muchi" | Mohit Chauhan, Harshdeep Kaur | 3:59 |
| 6. | "Bulleya" | Papon | 5:57 |
| 7. | "Tuk Tuk" | Nooran Sisters, Vishal Dadlani | 4:12 |
| 8. | "Jag Ghoomeya" (Female) | Neha Bhasin | 4:14 |
| 9. | "Rise of Sultan" | Shekhar Ravjiani | 2:46 |
| 10. | "Raula Paye Gaya – The Official Sultan Salute" | Rahat Fateh Ali Khan, 6 Pack Band | 3:31 |
| 11. | "Baby Nu Bass Pasand Hai" (Salman Khan Version) | Salman Khan, Iulia Vantur | 4:16 |
| 12. | "Jag Ghoomeya" (Salman Khan Version) | Salman Khan | 4:49 |
| 13. | "440 Volt" (Salman Khan Version) | Salman Khan | 4:28 |
| 14. | "Sultan" (Salman Khan Version) | Salman Khan | 4:42 |
| Total length: | | | 1:00:57 |

== Reception ==
Surabhi Redkar of Koimoi gave 3/5 to the album and wrote "Sultan‘s music album is quite commercial and will be a hit with Salman Khan’s fans for sure."

Rashma Shetty Bali of Bollywood Life gave four stars describing it as "a good mix of fun danceable songs and the soulful music". Vipin Nair of Music Aloud gave 7.5 out of 10, saying "Sultan is the best that Vishal Shekhar have sounded in a very long time". Aelina Kapoor of Rediff.com wrote "Sultan is a largely satisfactory album with good variety on offer. Though all its songs will not burn the charts, there are numbers that will keep both Salman fans as well as the purists happy."

Karthik Srinivasan of Milliblog wrote "Vishal and Shekhar’s comeback soundtrack offers and expansive range of songs and makes for a very good listen". In a negative review, The Indian Express-based critic Suanshu Khurana gave 1.5 out of 5 saying "Musically, it remains one of the most challenged and weakest scores by Vishal-Shekhar."

== Accolades ==
| Year | Award Ceremony | Category | Recipient(s) and nominee(s) | Result | Ref. |
|---|---|---|---|---|---|
| 2016 | Stardust Awards | Best Music Album | Sultan – YRF Music | Nominated | |
| 2016 | Stardust Awards | Best Playback Singer (Male) | Rahat Fateh Ali Khan – "Jag Ghoomeya" | Nominated | |
| 2016 | Stardust Awards | Best Playback Singer (Male) | Vishal Dadlani and Badshah – "Baby Ko Bass Pasand Hai" | Nominated | |
| 2016 | Stardust Awards | Best Music Director | Vishal–Shekhar | Nominated | |
| 2016 | Stardust Awards | Best Lyricist | Irshad Kamil – "Jag Ghoomeya" | Nominated | |
| 2016 | Mirchi Music Awards | Song of the Year | "Jag Ghoomeya" | Nominated | |
| 2016 | Mirchi Music Awards | Album of the Year | Vishal–Shekhar, Irshad Kamil | Nominated | |
| 2016 | Mirchi Music Awards | Male Vocalist of the Year | Rahat Fateh Ali Khan – "Jag Ghoomeya" | Nominated | |
| 2016 | Mirchi Music Awards | Female Vocalist of the Year | Neha Bhasin – "Jag Ghoomeya" | Nominated | |
| 2016 | Mirchi Music Awards | Music Composer of the Year | Vishal–Shekhar – "Jag Ghoomeya" | Nominated | |
| 2016 | Mirchi Music Awards | Lyricist of the Year | Irshad Kamil – "Jag Ghoomeya" | Nominated | |
| 2016 | Mirchi Music Awards | Raag-Inspired Song of the Year | "Jag Ghoomeya" | Nominated | |
| 2016 | Mirchi Music Awards | Best Song Producer (Programming & Arranging) | Kiran Kamath – "Baby Ko Bass Pasand Hai" | Nominated | |
| 2016 | Mirchi Music Awards | Best Background Score | Julius Packiam | Nominated | |
| 2017 | Filmfare Awards | Best Music Director | Vishal–Shekhar | Nominated | |
| 2017 | Filmfare Awards | Best Lyricist | Irshad Kamil – "Jag Ghoomeya" | Nominated | |
| 2017 | Filmfare Awards | Best Playback Singer (Male) | Rahat Fateh Ali Khan – "Jag Ghoomeya" | Nominated | |
| 2017 | Filmfare Awards | Best Playback Singer (Female) | Neha Bhasin – "Jag Ghoomeya" | Won | |
| 2017 | Zee Cine Awards | Best Music Director | Vishal–Shekhar | Nominated | |
| 2017 | Zee Cine Awards | Best Song of the Year | Vishal–Shekhar – "Baby Ko Bass Pasand Hai" | Nominated | |
| 2017 | Zee Cine Awards | Best Lyricist | Irshad Kamil – "Jag Ghoomeya" | Won | |
| 2017 | Zee Cine Awards | Best Lyricist | Irshad Kamil – "Sultan (Title Song)" | Nominated | |
| 2017 | Zee Cine Awards | Best Playback Singer (Male) | Rahat Fateh Ali Khan – "Jag Ghoomeya" | Nominated | |
| 2017 | Zee Cine Awards | Best Playback Singer (Male) | Sukhwinder Singh – "Sultan (Title Song)" | Nominated | |
| 2017 | Zee Cine Awards | Best Playback Singer (Female) | Neha Bhasin – "Jag Ghoomeya" | Won | |
| 2017 | Zee Cine Awards | Best Choreography | Farah Khan – "Baby Ko Bass Pasand Hai" | Nominated | |
| 2017 | Zee Cine Awards | Best Choreography | Vaibhavi Merchant – "Jag Ghoomeya" | Nominated | |
| 2017 | Zee Cine Awards | Best Choreography | Vaibhavi Merchant – "Sultan (Title Song)" | Nominated | |
