= Bandish Projekt =

- Born: Mayur Narvekar
- Genres: Indian Electronic, Drum and bass, Dubstep
- Occupations: Producer, Composer, Tabla Player, DJ
- Instruments: Tabla, Keys, Flute, Electronics, vocals
- Years active: 1998–present
- Labels: Bheja Fry Records, Generation Bass, Folktronic (Sony Music Independent), Buddha Bar
- Website: bandishprojekt.in

Bandish Projekt is the long-running electronic alter ego of producer, composer, and multi-instrumentalist, Mayur Narvekar, a pioneer of India’s electronic music movement since 1997.

Rooted in Indian street rhythms and ritual percussion, the project collides tradition with heavyweight bass, global club culture, and forward-thinking production. From early international festival appearances at Glastonbury, Bestival, Wychwood, Alchemy, and more, to the landmark 2009 album, Correkt, Bandish Projekt helped define India’s global electronic identity.

The 2010s saw worldwide recognition through releases like “Brown Skin Beauty,” “Lover,” and the cult-defining "Dakla Project," a genre-bending electronic folk movement that surpassed 500+ million views globally.

In 2021, “Bandar Baant” from the film Sherni brought Bandish Projekt’s sound to mainstream cinema, creating ripples across Bollywood and beyond. Still evolving, the project continues to blur borders with releases like "Beyond Borders" and "Distinct Disruption" (Bheja Fry Records). It stands firmly at the intersection of ancient rhythm and modern sonic rebellion.

== Biography ==
Bandish Projekt was earlier established by Mayur Narvekar Udyan Sagar, now Nucleya & Mehirr Nath Chopra. After the band separated in 2006, Mayur Narvekar has been the forefront of Bandish Projekt. Mayur was raised in Ahmedabad by a family of classical musicians and arts enthusiasts. His father and paternal uncle introduced him to the dholak at an early age. Through his interest and talent for percussion, he was encouraged to formally learn the tabla.

Narvekar studied classical tabla with his teacher Pandit Divyang Vakil for 20 years. He went on to win the All India Radio (AIR) competition for percussion in 2000, and was honoured with the prestigious "Pt. Nikhil Ghosh Memorial Promising Artist Award" in 2001.

Inspired by the music and producers of the West, Narvekar began to add to his repertory of classical sounds.Thus, his electronic act, Bandish Projekt, was conceived. After graduating from St. Xaviers College, Ahmedabad, in 2000 with a BA in psychology, Narvekar decided to pursue a full-time career in music.

== Career ==
After several years as a live performer, composer and producer, Narvekar moved to Mumbai in 2008. Bandish Projekt's first album, Correkt, was released in October 2009, followed by the single "Brown Skin Beauty" featuring Last Mango in Paris in 2010, and the EP "Chase" in March 2011. In December 2011, Bandish Projekt released another EP, "Lover," featuring Shaa’ir (Monica Dogra of Shaa'ir and Func), which was nominated for the 2012 MTV EMA award for Best Indian Act.

Bandish Projekt released two EPs in 2012, "I Am Not Alone" and "Correkt Remixed". Bandish Projekt's Alchemy Wins Asifa India Awards For Excellence the special Jury mention in the best animation film category.2014 Bandish Projekt receives GIMA Award (Global Indian Music Award ) for the best EDM track "TRAP" from the Ep "I am Not Alone" .

== Albums ==
Year	Album	Main Artist	Record label
2009	Correkt (Album)	Bandish Projekt	Bheja Fry Records
2010	Brown Skin Beauty (Single)	Bandish Projekt	Bheja Fry Records
2011	Chase (Single)	Bandish Projekt	Generation Bass
2011	Lover (Single)	Bandish Projekt & Shaa’ir	Generation Bass
2012	I am Not Alone (EP)	Bandish Projekt	Folk Tronic Sony music
2012	Correkt Remixed	Bandish Projekt	Folk Tronic Sony music
2013	Alchemy (Single)	Bandish Projekt	Bheja Fry Records
2014	Drop it (Single)	Bandish Projekt	Bheja Fry Records
2014	Connekt (Album)	Bandish Projekt	Bheja Fry Records
2015	Rare Man (Single)	Bandish Projekt	Bheja Fry Records
2015	Gondhal (Single) Ep	Bandish Projekt Feat Mc Mawali	Bheja Fry Records
2015	Common Tongue (EP)	Bandish Projekt Feat Last Mango in paris	Bheja Fry Records
2016	Katal Kalaa (EP)	Bandish Projekt Feat Swadesi	Bheja Fry Records
2017	(Ab Na Jagao )	Bandish Projekt Feat Vidhya Gopal	Bheja Fry Records
2017	(Dakla 2)	Bandish Projekt Feat Aishwarya Joshi & Maulik Nayak	Bheja Fry Records
2018	Katal kalaa Remix	Bandish Projekt Remix Ep	Bheja Fry Records
2019	Khulle Naagde (EP)	Bandish Projekt Feat Swadesi	Bheja Fry Records
2019	Dakla 4	Bandish Projekt feat. Aishwarya Joshi	Bheja Fry Records
2019	Ab Mori baat	Bandish Projekt feat. Vibha Saraf	Bheja Fry Records
2020	Aabh Ma	Bandish Projekt feat. Aishwarya Joshi & Aditya Gadhavi	Bheja Fry Records
2020	Home Crowd	Bandish Projekt	Bheja Fry Records
2020	Panduranga	Bandish Projekt feat. Chandana Bala Kalyan	Bheja Fry Records
2020	Dakla 5	Bandish Projekt & Aishwarya Joshi feat. Maulik Nayak	Bheja Fry Records
2020	Chithada	Bandish Projekt & 100 RBH	Bheja Fry Records
2021	Limbuda Jhule	Bandish Projekt feat. Aishwarya Joshi	Bheja Fry Records
2021	Dakla 6 Araj	Bandish Projekt & Aishwarya Joshi feat. Resmi Sateesh	Bheja Fry Records
2021	The Confluence	Bandish Projekt	Bheja Fry Records
2021	Kagaliya	Bandish Projekt feat. Aishwarya Joshi	Bheja Fry Records
2022	Faasle	Bandish Projekt feat. Bhavya Pandit	Bheja Fry Records
2022	Dakla 7	Bandish Projekt & Aishwarya Joshi feat. Maulik Nayak	Bheja Fry Records
2023	Shyaam	Bandish Projekt feat. Isha Nair	Bheja Fry Records
2023	Dhuaan Dhuaan	Bandish Projekt feat. Aishwarya Joshi	Bheja Fry Records
2023	Dakla 8	Bandish Projekt & Aishwarya Joshi feat. Maulik Nayak	Bheja Fry Records
2024	Beyond Borders	Bandish Projekt	Bheja Fry Records
2024	Dakla 9	Bandish Projekt & Aishwarya Joshi feat. Maulik Nayak	Bheja Fry Records
2025	Distinct Disruption	Bandish Projekt	Bheja Fry Records
2025	Reimagined	Bandish Projekt	Bheja Fry Records
2026	Ramwala	Bandish Projekt	Bheja Fry Records
