= Sisir Kana Dhar Chowdhury =

Indian musical artist (1937–2021)

- Born: 27 December 1937
- Died: 9 March 2021 (aged 83); Gurgaon, Haryana, India
- Genres: Hindustani classical music
- Occupation(s): Composer, Teacher
- Instrument(s): Violin, Viola

Sisir Kana Dhar Chowdhury (also written Sisirkana Dhar Choudhury; 27 December 1937 – 9 March 2021) introduced the viola to the Hindustani music sphere, and played a rare style of violin with an extra fifth melody string and sympathetic strings. Chowdhury was awarded the Sangeet Natak Academi Award in 1997 for her contribution to the field of Indian classical violin, and received the Dover Lane Music Conference's Sangeet Samman Award in 2017.

== Training ==
Chowdhury was seven years old when she began to play violin and vocal music. She later received training from V. G. Jog and Ali Akbar Khan, among others.

== Musical performance ==
Chowdhury began her musical performance career in Kolkata in 1953. She was a frequent performer on All India Radio and Television Though it is difficult to find recordings and even more rare to find video of Chowdhury's performances, it is said that Chowdhury would often play the alaap of a piece on viola, and use violin for the remaining portion of the concert. Sometimes an entire concert would be done in viola. In the 70's, she performed as a trio with Ali Akbar Khan and Nikhil Banerjee at many music conferences in Kolkata. She also performed in international conferences, representing India as a cultural representative in Russia, Finland and Afghanistan, as well as at a conference in Nepal commemorating the country's independence. Both her violin and viola were of special construction, with a fifth melody string for increased range as well as the addition of sypathetic strings for resonance. A number of sources noted that it was rare for a woman in the 1950s to take up an instrument professionally, and those that did tended to be vocalists, in contrast with Chowdhury's specialty in bowed instruments.

== Musicology ==
Along with her interest in playing music, Chowdhury made contributions to the field of musicology. She was consulted in the writings of other ethnomusical scholars, and wrote her book The Origin and Evolution of Violin As a Musical Instrument: And Its Contribution to the Progressive Flow of Indian Classical Music in 2010. After retiring from her post as a professor at Rabindra Bharati University in 1997 she moved to the US to join the faculty of the Ali Akbar College of Music and transcribe the music of Allauddin Khan from the collection there. Her transcriptions were of a unique quality because she trained under Khan's son, giving her special insight.
