= Shri (musician) =

British musician

Shri Sriram
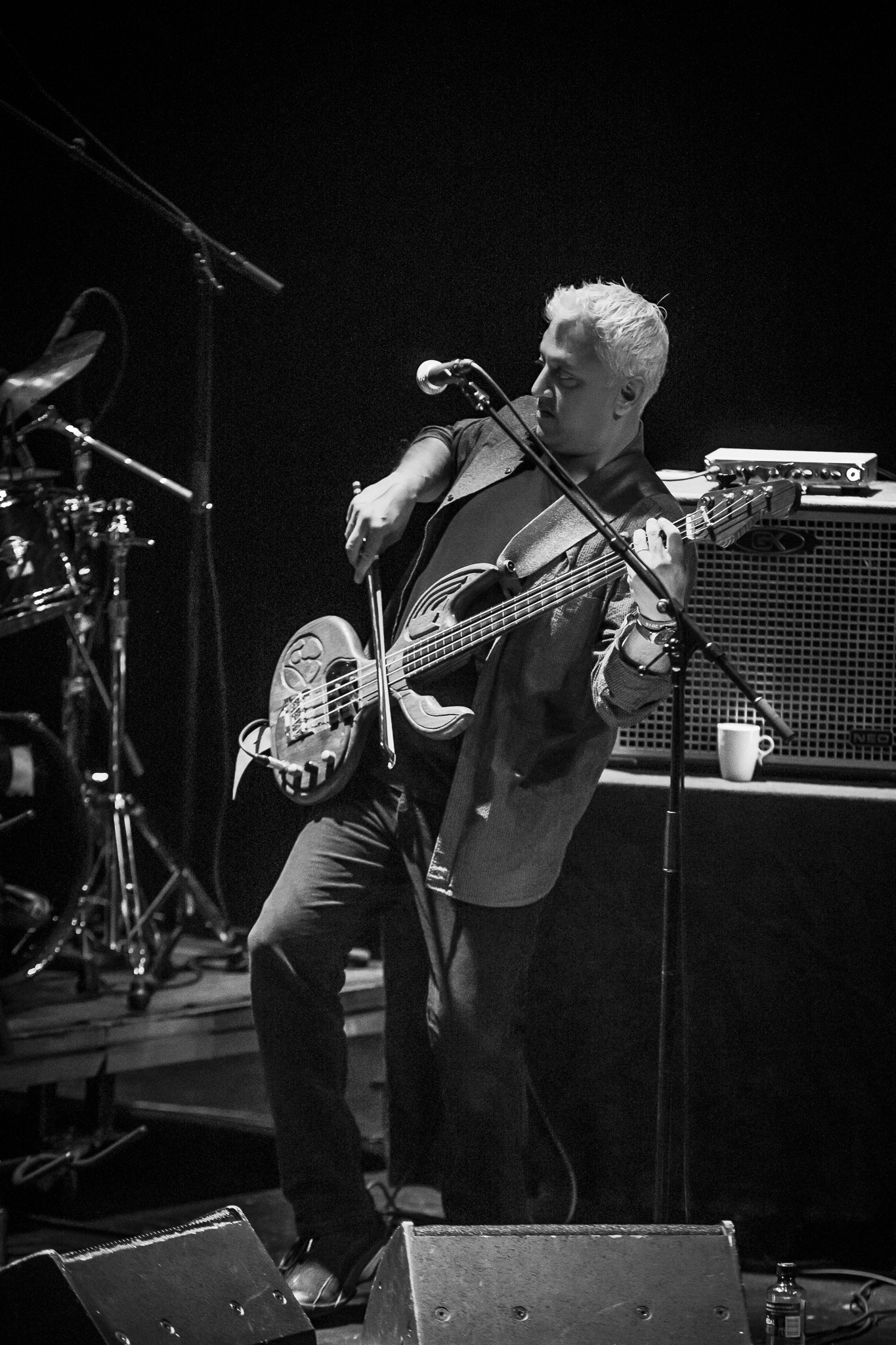
- Shri performing in 2015

Background information
- Born: Shrikanth Sriram; Bangalore, India
- Genres: New age; electronic; drum and bass; jazz
- Occupations: Musician; composer; producer
- Instruments: Guitar; bass; flute
- Years active: 1990–present
- Labels: Drum the Bass; Outcaste; Tommy Boy; PIAS; Sony
- Member of: Badmarsh & Shri
- Website: shri.co.uk

Shri (born Shrikanth Sriram) is an Indian-born British composer, multi-instrumentalist, and producer. He specializes in acoustic, electric, and electronic-based live performances and incorporates traditional Indian instruments into his music.

== Early life ==
Shri grew up in Mumbai, India, into a musical family. His father plays the sitar, and his mother and sister play the Carnatic violin. He trained as a classical tabla player for about fourteen years at Pandit Nikhil Ghosh's school in Mumbai. Tired of the rigidity of classical music, Shri went on to teach himself bass, guitar, and flute. Shri designed his fretless bass guitar so that it could accommodate a bowing technique.

== Career ==
Having previously played percussion with the Indian rock band Indus Creed and bass in the jazz outfit Azure Hades (with whom he recorded an album), Shri moved to London in the 1990s and collaborated as a bass player with musicians such as Talvin Singh, Nitin Sawhney, and DJ Badmarsh, with whom he recorded under the name Badmarsh & Shri.

Shri toured for five years with Sawhney, which led in 1997 to Shri's first solo album, Drum the Bass, produced by Sawhney and released by the London-based label Outcaste Records. Later, Badmarsh & Shri produced two albums for Outcaste Records as a duo: Dancing Drums in 1998 and Signs in 2001. Shri released his second solo album, East Rain, in 2005.

Shri has also collaborated musically on theatrical productions—composing for Akademi's 2001 Coming of Age dance project at London's South Bank, the Builder's Association/Motiroti co-production Alladeen in 2003, and Tamasha Theatre Company's Strictly Dandia in 2005.

In 2007, he released the album Seven Steps, which featured the single "Just for a Minute".

In 2011, he produced and performed bass and bowed bass on the track "Quest", with Viveick Rajagopalan on the mridangam and kanjira, and Embar Kannan on violin and vocals. "Quest" was released by Folktronic. He also launched a new collaborative project, titled ShriLektric. The same year, Shri was featured in season 1, episode 5 of The Dewarists.

In 2015, Shri released the album Just a Vibration, a collaboration with Hammonds Saltaire Brass Band.

== Discography ==
Year	Album	Main Artist	Record label
1997	Drum the Bass	Shri	Outcaste Records
1998	Dancing Drums	Badmarsh and Shri	Outcaste Records
2001	Signs	Badmarsh and Shri	Outcaste Records
2001	Swarm (12" Vinyl)	Badmarsh and Shri	Outcaste Records
2001	CSI (soundtrack)	Badmarsh and Shri	Hip-O Records
2005	East Rain	Shri	MSI Records
2007	Seven Steps	Shri	Drum the Bass Records
2008	Heavy World (EP)	Shri	Drum the Bass Records
2008	Just for a Minute (EP)	Shri	Drum the Bass Records
2009	Barah Aana (soundtrack)	Shri	Shringar Films Pvt. Ltd.
2010	Striker (soundtrack)	Shri	T-Series
2011	Quest	Shri feat. Vivek Rajagopalan	Folktronic
2011	Google Chrome "Tanjore" (soundtrack)	Shri	Folktronic
2016	Just a Vibration	Shri feat. Hammonds Saltaire Band	Drum the Bass Records
2017	Bank Chor (soundtrack)	Shri	YRF films
2020	The Letter	Shri	Jazzland Recordings
