= Signs (Badmarsh & Shri album) =

Studio album by Badmarsh & Shri
- Released: 2001
- Recorded: 2001
- Label: Outcaste; Nutone
- Producer: Mike Spencer, Badmarsh & Shri

Badmarsh & Shri chronology
Dancing Drums (1998)	Signs (2001)

Signs is the second album by the English electronic music duo Badmarsh & Shri, released in 2001.

The duo parted ways after the release of Signs.

== Reception ==
Professional ratings
Review scores
Source	Rating
AllMusic	3.5/5 stars
The Encyclopedia of Popular Music	4/5 stars

AllMusic criticized the album for being slow and of poor quality for the first few tracks, but asserted that the duo has achieved a distinctive style and complimented Shri's multi-instrumental versatility. The Encyclopedia of Popular Music deemed the album "excellent."

== Track listing ==
1. "Signs"
2. "Swarm"
3. "Get Up"
4. "Mountain Path"
5. "Day by Day"
6. "Soaring Beyond"
7. "Sajanna"
8. "Tribal"
9. "Bang"
10. "Last Mile"
11. "Appa"
