= Shamur =

Music Group

Shamur is a crunk duo formed by Italy-based producers Emanuele Marascia and Sandro Murru. Shamur was signed to an exclusive multi-album worldwide deal with DSE Records, and Universal Music Group in the UK.

Their music combines stereotypical crunk music played in Atlanta nightclubs with Asian music samples from Bollywood movies and Rai music, with Teresa Solinas and an undisclosed man of Punjabi origin as lead singers.

Shamur's debut song was "Let the Music Play", released in 2004, followed by "Gonna Make It".

"Let the Music Play" was sampled in 2021 by Sachin–Jigar for the film Roohi, with the crunk beat replaced with a moombahton beat. The re-released version of the song reached #2 on the UK Asian Music Charts.
