= Roohi (2021 film) =

2021 Indian film by Hardik Mehta

- Theatrical release poster
- Directed by: Hardik Mehta
- Written by: Mrighdeep Singh Lamba; Gautam Mehra
- Produced by: Dinesh Vijan; Mrighdeep Singh Lamba
- Starring: Rajkummar Rao; Janhvi Kapoor; Varun Sharma
- Cinematography: Amalendu Chaudhary
- Edited by: Huzefa Lokhandwala
- Music by: Songs: Sachin–Jigar; Score: Ketan Sodha
- Production companies: Maddock Films; Jio Studios
- Distributed by: Jio Studios
- Release date: 11 March 2021
- Running time: 134 minutes
- Country: India
- Language: Hindi
- Box office: est. ₹30.33 crore

Roohi is a 2021 Indian Hindi-language comedy horror film directed by Hardik Mehta and produced by Dinesh Vijan under the banner Maddock Films. It tells the story of a ghost who abducts brides on their honeymoons. The film stars Rajkummar Rao, Janhvi Kapoor and Varun Sharma.

It was announced on 29 March 2019 and filming kicked off on 14 June 2019 in Agra. The film was set to release in June 2020, but the COVID-19 pandemic in India interrupted production. Roohi was theatrically released in India on 11 March 2021. The film received negative reviews and was affected by post-COVID business conditions, earning about ₹30 crore at the box office against a production budget of ₹20 crore.

Originally promoted as a spiritual spinoff to Stree (2018), the film was formally excluded from the Maddock Horror Comedy Universe before being mentioned in an Easter Egg reference in the third official instalment of the franchise, Munjya (2024).

== Plot ==
Bhawra Pandey and Kattanni Qureshi are from Bagadpur village, where it is customary for the girl to be abducted by the man who desires to marry her. They are tasked by their boss and kidnapping-gang leader Guniya Bhai to kidnap Roohi as part of a contract with a guy who wishes to marry her. However, a death in the family of the groom forces them to keep her in hiding in an abandoned woodworking shop so that the marriage can take place after the funeral. During their stay, Bhawra realises that Roohi is actually possessed by a demonic spirit, which is corroborated by her father. Roohi was actually supposed to be married a year ago, but the groom and his family fled after seeing that she was possessed.

Bhawra falls for Roohi and tries to coax the spirit from her body; Kattanni, on the other hand, is smitten by the demonic spirit, who identifies herself as Afza, and tries to bring her forward instead of Roohi so that he can talk to her. They learn that the demon is a Mudiyapairi (a witch with backward-turned feet who is deemed to be extremely strong), and she will not leave unless she gets married along with the girl she is possessing. Guniya Bhai, fearing the police investigation behind Roohi's kidnapping, instructs them to abandon her, but they refuse, forcing him to send his henchmen to get the job done. The henchmen, while trying to assault Kattanni, get gravely injured by Afza and report this to Guniya Bhai.

Bhawra finds out from an old woman that the 'Mudiyapairi' has to be tricked into marrying a man who is already married, which makes her the mistress and forces her to leave the body she is possessing. The old woman had been possessed before by the same witch and had exorcised the spirit, but not before the enraged spirit killed her supposed husband. The henchmen were attacked by Afza (one was murdered and the other injured), so Bhawra, Roohi, and Kattanni leave for a village called Chimmattipur, where Bhawra marries a dog to trick the witch. However, the villagers chastise him for bringing a witch into their sacred village. Guniya Bhai arrives to take revenge but realizes that Afza has to get married in less than a day. Eager to rebuild his reputation, Guniya Bhai tells Afza she can marry the guy who had given the contract to abduct Roohi.

Bhawra and Kattanni arrive at the wedding; Kattanni, decked in Bhawra's wedding attire, convinces Afza to marry him. They are interrupted by the old lady, who tells Afza the marriage is a fraud, and deceives her into believing by showing her the video of the dog wedding. She gets confused seeing Bhawra in the groom's attire and mistakes him for Kattanni. An enraged Afza commands Bhawra to marry him, but is stopped by Roohi. Roohi then decides to marry Afza herself, thereby embracing the strength Afza had given her rather than treating her as an enemy.

Roohi and Afza accept each other and leave Bhawra and Kattanni behind. When the police arrive with Roohi's father, they are told by the old woman that Roohi has run away with herself, but the old woman disappears, indicating that she might have been helping Afza all along, as she herself had married “Mudiyapairi” in the past.

== Cast ==
- Rajkummar Rao as Bhawra Pandey
- Janhvi Kapoor as Roohi / Afza
- Varun Sharma as Kattanni Qureshi
- Alexx O'Nell as Tim
- Manav Vij as Guniya Shakeel
- Sarita Joshi as Budhiya
- Sumit Gulati as Paras
- Rajesh Jais as Roohi's father
- Gautam Mehra as Lucky Pandit
- Aadesh Bharadwaj as Riaz
- Abhinav Jain as inspector

== Music ==
Roohi

Soundtrack album by Sachin–Jigar
- Released: 5 March 2021
- Recorded: 2019–20
- Genre: Feature film soundtrack
- Length: 13:17
- Language: Hindi
- Label: Sony Music India

Sachin–Jigar chronology
Shakuntala Devi (2020)	Roohi (2021)

The film's music was composed by Sachin–Jigar while lyrics were written by Amitabh Bhattacharya, IP Singh, and Jigar Saraiya.

The third song Nadiyon Paar (Let the Music Play Again) is remake version of the famous 2004 Shamur party song Let The Music Play.

Tracks
No.	Title	Singer(s)	Length
1.	"Panghat"	Asees Kaur, Divya Kumar, Sachin–Jigar; Rap: Mellow D	2:59
2.	"Kiston"	Jubin Nautiyal, Sachin-Jigar	2:41
3.	"Nadiyon Paar (Let the Music Play Again)" (Lyrics by IP Singh, Jigar Saraiya)	Shamur, Rashmeet Kaur, IP Singh, Sachin-Jigar	2:44
4.	"Bhootni"	Mika Singh	2:27
5.	"Bhauji"	Divya Kumar	2:26
Total length:			13:17

== Release ==
The film was initially planned for release on 20 March 2020, but the makers later announced 17 April as the new release date. However, it was further pushed to 5 June on 17 February.

On 15 February 2021, the title of the film was changed to Roohi from Roohi Afzana and it was released in India on 11 March 2021.

== Reception ==
=== Critical response ===
Roohi received generally negative reviews from critics. On the review aggregator website Rotten Tomatoes, 10% of 10 critics' reviews are positive, with an average rating of 4/10.

The Times of India gave it a rating of 3.5 stars out of 5 and said, "Roohi is an entertaining blend of laughs and thrills". Monika Rawal Kukreja of Hindustan Times described Roohi as a "convoluted film". She praised Rao and Sharma's equation in the movie but criticised Kapoor by calling her performance average. Saibal Chatterjee of NDTV gave the film a rating of 2/5 and stated that the film "seeks to subvert genre conventions and venture into the terrain of feminist rebellion". Nandini Ramnath of Scroll stated that "Roohi is a Horror-comedy movie which has some spirit but no soul". Rohit Vats of CNN-IBN wrote, "Written by Mrighdeep Singh Lamba and Gautam Mehra, Roohi is totally about spontaneity and a solid beginning; Though both Rao and Sharma are in their favourite zone, but their back and forth and punchlines evoke laughs".

Shubhra Gupta of The Indian Express gave Roohi a rating of 1/5 and called it a "plain horrible" movie. She further stated, "Roohi is missing a coherent plot and writing. All we get is one cringe-inducing sequence after the next". Trade Analyst Taran Adarsh rated the film 2/5 and called it 'Disappointing'. further he said "Nowhere close to Stree, Weak screenwriting, Works in bits and spurts, not in entirety, Second half + climax lacks impact. But he praised Performances of lead cast. Anupama Chopra of Film Companion wrote, "The film wants to juggle many balls – horror, comedy, feminist messaging, a love triangle, a bromance – but ends up dropping almost all of them".

Anna M. M. Vetticad of Firstpost gave the film a rating of 1.5/5 and wrote, "Roohi is horror comedy that’s dead on arrival despite sporadic humour, feminist aspirations". She praised Rao and Sharma for their comic timing but criticised the writers, the overall plot of the film and Kapoor's performance by stating, "They could have cast any other actor in her place and it would not have made an inch of a difference to the film." she further stated, "Nothing better indicates Roohi’s lack of commitment to its feminist goals than the irrelevance of its female star". Namrata Joshi of National Herald compared Roohi with Stree and stated, "While Stree, despite the fluff and inconsistencies, was eminently watchable, Roohi is unbearable to the core. There are absolutely no jump-from-the-seat moments, no chills-down-the-spine eeriness to justify the “horror” side of it. As far as comedy is concerned, there are barely any worthy gags and irreverent lines, only lame slapstick and jokes that fall flat". Roktim Rajpal from the Deccan Herald called Roohi a "Big Disappointment". He praised Rao and Sharma's performance but criticised Kapoor and stated that Kapoor failed to make an impact. Sushri Sahu of Mashable India praised Rao and Sharma but criticised Kapoor and the direction of the movie by stating, "Kapoor is simply unwatchable with a flat performance without any sound direction by Hardik Mehta."

=== Box office ===
Roohi grossed ₹3.06 crore on its opening day and ₹16.41 crore in its first week. The film was made on a production budget of ₹35 crore, and during its theatrical run, it grossed ₹30.33 crore at the worldwide box office.
