= Fateh (rapper) =

Fateh Singh
- Also known as: Young Fateh Doe & Fateh
- Born: Fateh Singh; October 19, 1989 (age 37); Bangkok, Thailand
- Origin: Toronto, Ontario, Canada; Hayward, California, U.S.
- Genres: Hip hop; Desi Hip Hop; Bhangra
- Occupations: Rapper; Singer; Songwriter; Music producer
- Instrument: Vocals
- Years active: 2009–present
- Website: www.fatehdoe.com

Fateh Singh, better known by his stage name Fateh Doe or mononym Fateh, is a Toronto-based Indo-Canadian rapper, singer, and songwriter. His music career gained traction in 2012 when he began to work with Dr Zeus.

== Career ==
Fateh brought his Bay Area style of rap to Toronto and infused it with his newly cultural surroundings of the Punjabi community, in Toronto, where he was able to increase his fluency in the Punjabi language. Fateh began as Young Fateh and then to Fateh. Subsequently, he then changed his name to Fateh Doe. He released three mixtapes California State of Mind (2009), One Verse Curse (2010) and Mr Wall Street (2011). He also once tried to meet Dr Zeus at his concert in a nightclub in California so he could give him CDs of his mixtapes.

Fateh gained popularity when he was discovered by Dr Zeus in 2012 through Jephin Varghese. He was featured in many tracks with Dr Zeus. He also joined the band Zoo Babies and was featured in the debut album of the band. Fateh was then approached by many other artists including Amrinder Gill, Jaz Dhami, The PropheC and Gippy Grewal. He also sung the song "Lovely" from the 2014 Bollywood film Happy New Year.

In August 2015, he released his debut solo single ‘Naiyo Jaan De’. He also received four nominations Breakthrough Act, Best North American Act, Best Songwriter and Best Urban Asian Act at the 2015 BritAsia Music & Film Awards. In 2016, he also released his debut album Bring It Home, which also featured a guest appearance from The PropheC. He was featured on the song "Tha Tha" from the album Global Injection by Dr Zeus, alongside Zora Randhawa and Preet Singh in 2018. Fateh released his fourth album on October 23, 2020, under the name Goes Without Saying. On January 27, 2022, Fateh released his fifth studio album Hate That I Love You.

== Discography ==
=== Mixtapes ===
- California State of Mind (2009)
- One Verse Curse (2010)
- Mr. Wall Street (2011)

=== Albums ===
- Bring It Home (2016)
- To Whom It May Concern (2019)
- New Memories (2019)
- Goes Without Saying (2020)
- Hate That I Love You (2022)
- Long Story Short (2022)
- Don't Forget To Call (2025)

=== Singles ===
- "Raazi" - JioSaavn AO (2019)
- "Proud To Be Desi" - Khan Bhaini (feat. Fateh) (2020)
- "Saahan" - Aman Sarang (feat. Dr Zeus Shortie & Fateh Doe)
- "Rendeh" - Saini Surinder (feat. Dr Zeus Shortie & Fateh Doe)
- "Age 22" - Navjeet Khalon (feat. Dr Zeus Shortie, Fateh Doe)
- "Mainu Single Rehna" - Rajveer (feat. Dr Zeus & Fateh Doe)
- "We Just Wanna Party" - Naywaan, Dr Zeus, Fateh Doe & DS
- "Pakka Sharabi" - Rajveer (feat. Dr Zeus, Shortie, Fateh Doe)
- "Painkiller" - Miss Pooja (feat. Dr Zeus & Fateh Doe)
- "Black Suit" - Preet Harpal (feat. Dr Zeus & Fateh Doe)
- "Lovely" - Kanika Kapoor (feat. Fateh Doe)
- "Inch" - Zora Randawa (feat. Dr Zeus & Fateh Doe)
- "Pendu" - Amrinder Gill (feat. Fateh Doe)
- "Beparwaiyan Refix" - Jaz Dhami (feat. Dr Zeus & Fateh Doe)
- "Black Til"- Girik Aman, Dr Zeus, Fateh Doe)
- "Show Match" - Dilpreet Dhillon (feat. Desi Crew and Fateh Doe)
- "Etwaar" - Jazzy B (feat: Dr Zeus & Fateh Doe)
- "Shades Of Black" - Gagan Kokri (Feat: Ayo HeartBeat & Fateh Doe)
- "Network" - Gav Masti (Feat. Dr Zeus & Fateh Doe)
- "Naiyo Jaan De" - (Fateh Doe)
- "Pagal" (Feat. Jus Reign)
- "Panga" Remix (My Way) (Feat. Jus Reign)
- "22Da" - Zora Randhawa (feat: Jay-K & Fateh Doe)
- "Dar Lagda" - Raju Dinehwala (feat: Dr Zeus & Fateh Doe)
- "Body" - Mickey Singh (feat: Fateh Doe)
- "Chete Karda 2" - Resham Singh Anmol (feat. Fateh Doe)
- "Nain" - Pav Dharia feat. Fateh
- "Bamb Gaana" - Jazzy B
- "High"- Prabh Deep feat. Fateh

== See also ==
- List of Canadian musicians
- List of Indo-Canadians
- List of people from California
