= Shaa'ir and Func =

Indian alternative/electronic music duo

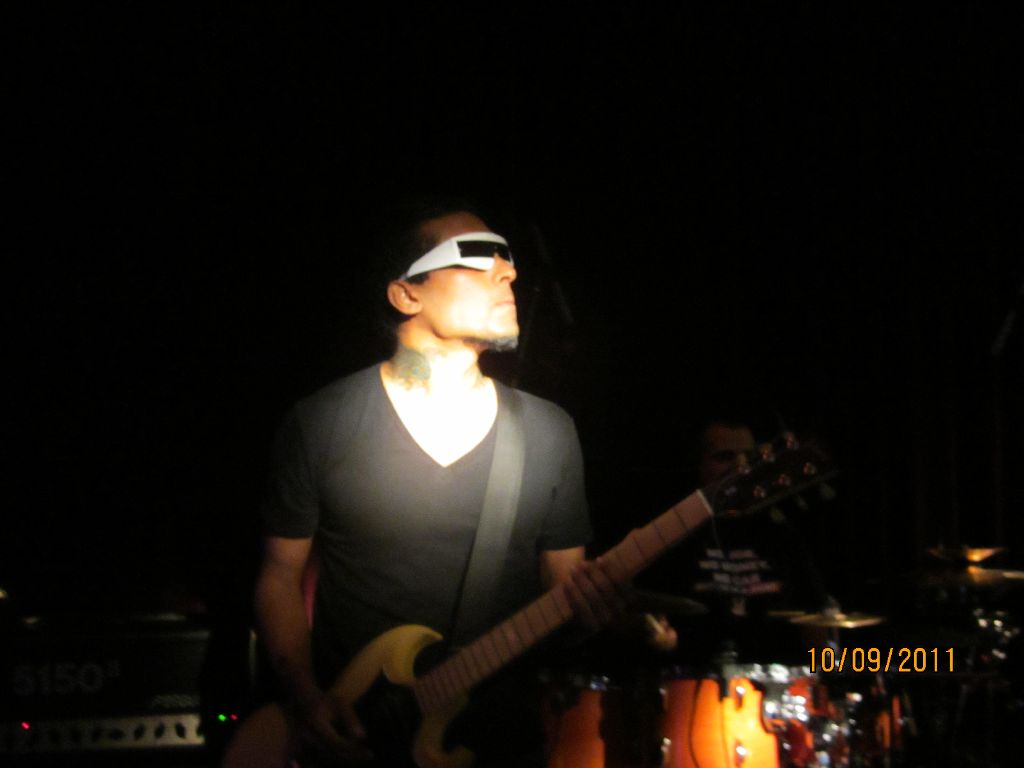
- Randolph Correia of Shaa'ir and Func, in 2011.

Background information
- Origin: Mumbai, Maharashtra, India
- Genres: Electronica, Alternative, Experimental Music, Rock Music
- Years active: 2007–present
- Label: BlueFrog records
- Members: Monica Dogra; Randolph Correia
- Website: shaairandfunc.com

Shaa'ir and Func (sometimes stylised as "S+F") was an alternative, electronic music duo from Mumbai, composed of Monica Dogra and Randolph Correia, formed in 2007.

== Discography ==
| Year | Title |
|---|---|
| 2006 | New Day: The Love Album |
| 2008 | Light Tribe |
| 2010 | Mantis |
| 2014 | Re:cover |
