= India's Got Latent season 2 =

2026 Indian Television series season

India's Got Latent
- Season 2
- Hosted by: Samay Raina
- Judges: Samay Raina; Balraj Singh Ghai
- No. of episodes: 9 + 6

Release
- Original network: Netflix and YouTube
- Original release: 20 June – 15 November 2026

The second season of the Indian reality talent-comedy web television series India's Got Latent was created, produced, and hosted by Indian stand-up comedian and internet personality Samay Raina. Following the viral success of its first season in 2024, the second season expanded its production scale and distribution network. It premiered in June 2026 via a unique dual-platform simulcast on both Netflix and YouTube. New episodes were released every two weeks on both platforms.

The show features aspiring performers showcasing eccentric, bizarre, and unfiltered "latent" talents. These acts are humorously critiqued by Raina alongside a rotating panel of prominent Indian comedians, internet creators, and Bollywood celebrities.

== Format ==
The show's core mechanics remain the same, but performed on a larger scale. Contestants perform an unconventional skill. Before each performance, contestants have to rate themselves. If the average rating given by the judge panel after the performance matches the contestant's self-rating, the contestant wins. The humor comes from the creators', contestants', and celebrity guest panel's blunt evaluations, deadpan delivery, and comedic banter.

== Panelists ==
Timeline of hosts, judges and other personnel
Starring	Episodes														
Starring	1	2	3	1+	4	2+	5	3+	6	4+	7	5+	8	6+	9
Samay Raina	Host & Judge	Host & Judge	Host & Judge	Host & Judge	Host & Judge	Host & Judge	Host & Judge	Host & Judge	Host & Judge	Host & Judge	Host & Judge	Host & Judge	Host & Judge	Host & Judge	Host & Judge
Balraj Singh Ghai	Judge	Judge							Judge	Judge				Judge	Judge
Aashish Solanki	Guest Judge													Guest Judge	
Alia Bhatt	Guest Judge														
Sharvari	Guest Judge														
Haarsh Limbachiyaa		Guest Judge				Guest Judge									
Kiku Sharda		Guest Judge													
Chandan Prabhakar		Guest Judge													
Tanmay Bhat			Guest Judge		Guest Judge								Guest Judge		
Vishal Dadlani			Guest Judge												
Raghu Ram			Guest Judge												
Yashraj			Guest Judge												
Munawar Faruqui				Guest Judge											
Rohan Joshi				Guest Judge											
Raghav Juyal				Guest Judge											
Niharika NM				Guest Judge											
Karan Aujla					Guest Judge										
Rahul Dua					Guest Judge										
Gurleen Pannu					Guest Judge										
Badshah						Guest Judge									
Sourav Joshi						Guest Judge									
Rajat Sood						Guest Judge						Guest Judge			
Archana Puran Singh							Guest Judge								
Orry Awatramani							Guest Judge								
Sharon Verma							Guest Judge	Guest Judge							
Nishant Suri							Guest Judge								
Varun Dhawan								Guest Judge							
Medha Shankr								Guest Judge							
Nishant Tanwar								Guest Judge							
Rakhi Sawant									Guest Judge						
Kushagra Srivastava									Guest Judge						
Ashneer Grover									Guest Judge						
Deepak Kalal										Guest Judge					
Ravi Gupta										Guest Judge					
Agu Stanley Chiedozie										Guest Judge					
Nawazuddin Siddiqui											Guest Judge				
Kaustubh Agarwal											Guest Judge				
Bhuvan Bam											Guest Judge				
Mukesh Chhabra											Guest Judge				
Ayushmann Khurrana												Guest Judge			
Suhani Shah												Guest Judge			
Aditya Kulshreshth												Guest Judge			
MC Stan													Guest Judge		
Madhur Virli													Guest Judge		
Arpit Bala													Guest Judge		
Huma Qureshi														Guest Judge	
Krushna Abhishek														Guest Judge	
Raftaar															Guest Judge
Sahil Kale															Guest Judge

== Episodes ==
No. overall	No. in season	Title	Streaming platform	Original release date
1	1	"INDIA’S GOT LATENT S2 EP1 ft. Alia Bhatt, Sharvari, Ashish Solanki"	YouTube, Netflix	20 June 2026
Guest judges: Alia Bhatt, Sharvari and Aashish Solanki; Winner: Avinash Agarwal; Summary: Promotion of the film Alpha
2	2	"INDIA’S GOT LATENT S2 EP2 ft. Harssh Limbachiya, Kiku Sharda, Chandan Prabhakar"	YouTube, Netflix	3 July 2026
Guest judges: Kiku Sharda, Haarsh Limbachiyaa and Chandan Prabhakar; Winner: Kapil Dinkar; Summary: Indian comedy icons grace the show's panel.
3	3	"INDIA’S GOT LATENT S2 EP3 ft. Raghu Ram, Vishal Dadlani, Tanmay Bhat, Yashraj"	YouTube, Netflix	17 July 2026
Guest judges: Vishal Dadlani, Raghu Ram, Yashraj and Tanmay Bhat; Winner: Vishal Pathak; Summary: Musicians and comedians grace the panel.
4	1+	"INDIA’S GOT LATENT S2 Bonus EP1 ft. Raghav Juyal, Munawar, Niharika NM, Rohan Joshi"	YouTube (Members Only)	27 July 2026
Guest judges: Raghav Juyal, Rohan Joshi, Munawar Faruqui and Niharika NM; Winner: Summary: Promotion of the film Bhai Tera Star Hai
5	4	"INDIA’S GOT LATENT S2 EP4 ft. Karan Aujla, Tanmay Bhat, Gurleen Pannu, Rahul Dua"	YouTube, Netflix	17 July 2026
Guest judges: Karan Aujla, Gurleen Pannu, Rahul Dua and Tanmay Bhat; Winner: Gaurav Madan; Summary: Musicians and comedians grace the panel.
6	2+	"INDIA’S GOT LATENT S2 Bonus EP2 ft. Badshah, Sourav Joshi, Harssh Limbachiyaa, Rajat Sood"	YouTube (Members Only)	10 August 2026
Guest judges: Badshah, Haarsh Limbachiyaa, Rajat Sood and Sourav Joshi; Winner: Fadhili Ally Pazi; Summary: Musicians and comedians grace the panel.
7	5	"INDIA’S GOT LATENT S2 EP5 ft. Orry, Archana Puran Singh, Sharon Verma, Nishant Suri"	YouTube, Netflix	28 August 2026
Guest judges: Archana Puran Singh, Sharon Verma, Orry Awatramani and Nishant Suri; Winner: Chello Meme; Summary: Comedians grace the panel.
8	3+	"Exclusive Episode: Ft. Varun Dhawan, Medha Shankr, Nishant Tanwar, Sharon Verma"	Netflix	4 September 2026
Guest judges: Varun Dhawan, Sharon Verma, Medha Shankr and Nishant Tanwar; Winner: Vijay Poriya; Summary: Comedians and actors grace the panel.
9	6	"INDIA’S GOT LATENT S2 EP6 ft. Rakhi Sawant, Ashneer Grover, Kushagra Srivastava"	YouTube, Netflix	6 September 2026
Guest judges: Rakhi Sawant, Ashneer Grover, and Kushagra Srivastava; Winner: Summary: Comedians grace the panel.
10	4+	"INDIA’S GOT LATENT S2 Bonus EP 3 ft. Deepak Kalal, Ravi Gupta, Agu Stanley"	YouTube (Members Only)	13 September 2026
Guest judges: Deepak Kalal, Ravi Gupta, and Agu Stanley Chiedozie; Winner: Summary: Comedians grace the panel.
11	7	"INDIA’S GOT LATENT S2 EP7 ft. Nawazuddin Siddiqui, Bhuvan Bam, Mukesh Chhabra, Kaustubh Agarwal"	YouTube, Netflix	18 September 2026
Guest judges: Nawazuddin Siddiqui, Bhuvan Bam, Mukesh Chhabra, Kaustubh Agarwal; Winner: Prateik Bharadwaj; Summary: Comedians and actors grace the panel.
12	5+	"INDIA'S GOT LATENT S2 Bonus EP 5 ft. Ayushmann Khurrana, Suhani Shah, Kullu, Rajat Sood"	YouTube (Members Only)	27 September 2026
Guest judges: Ayushmann Khurrana, Suhani Shah, Aditya Kulshreshth, Rajat Sood; Winner: Mrugank Pathare, Kanisha Malhotra, Sachin Sonawani; Summary: Promotion of the film Udta Teer.
13	8	"INDIA'S GOT LATENT S2 EP8 ft. MC Stan, Tanmay Bhat, Arpit Bala, Madhur Virli"	YouTube	25 October 2026
Guest judges: MC Stan, Tanmay Bhat, Arpit Bala, Madhur Virli; Winner: Odi Ji; Summary: Comedians and musicians grace the panel.
14	6+	"Exclusive Episode 9: Ft.Huma Qureshi, Krushna Abhishek, Aashish Solanki, Balraj Ghai"	Netflix	13 November 2026
Guest judges: Huma Qureshi, Krushna Abhishek, Ashish Solanki; Winner: Bhagyashree Tarke; Summary: Comedians and actors grace the panel.
15	9	"INDIA’S GOT LATENT S2 EP9 ft. Raftaar, Balraj Ghai, Sahil Kale"	YouTube, Netflix	15 November 2026
Guest judges: Raftaar, Sahil Kale; Winner: N/A; Summary: Comedians and singers grace the panel.

== Reception ==
=== Audience viewership ===
The first episode of India's Got Latent season 2 garnered 45 million views on YouTube within four days of its release; on Netflix it recorded 2.2 million views, ranking seventh in the Global Top 10 Non-English Shows chart, as of 25 June 2026.

According to a mid-year report by Ormax Media, it became the most watched Indian streaming title of the first half of 2026, with an estimated 38.5 million viewers.
