= 2023 MTV Europe Music Awards =

Planned music award ceremony in France

- Location: Paris Nord Villepinte, Paris, France
- Most wins: Taylor Swift (3)
- Most nominations: Taylor Swift (7)
- Website: mtvema.com

Television/radio coverage
- Network: Paramount International Networks; MTV (International); Pluto TV
- Produced by: Bruce Gilmer; Richard Godfrey; Debbie Phillips; Chloe Mason

The 2023 MTV Europe Music Awards were planned to take place on 5 November 2023 at the Paris Nord Villepinte in Paris, France. The ceremony was cancelled on 19 October due to the Gaza war, becoming the first EMAs to be cancelled in its history.

== Announcement and cancellation ==
On 11 May 2023, MTV announced that the awards show would be held in Paris; the city hosted the ceremony for the first time in 1995. The planned performers and presenters were announced on 17 October 2023.

On 19 October 2023, Paramount Global announced the cancellation of the ceremony due to the Gaza war, and France's terrorism high alert and airports security threats. It was the first time that an EMAs was cancelled in its history. Despite this, the voting remained open until 31 October and the winning artists, who were revealed on 5 November, received their awards at a later date.

== Nominees and winners ==
The nominees were first revealed by Billboard Brasil on 3 October 2023. MTV officially revealed them on 4 October. Taylor Swift led the nominations with seven, followed by Olivia Rodrigo and SZA with six nominations, and Doja Cat, Måneskin, Miley Cyrus and Nicki Minaj each with 4 nominations. The winners were revealed on 5 November. Taylor Swift was the most awarded artist with three wins, followed by Nicki Minaj and Jungkook with two each.

Best Song	Best Video
Jung Kook featuring Latto – "Seven"; Doja Cat – "Paint the Town Red"; Miley Cyrus – "Flowers"; Olivia Rodrigo – "Vampire"; SZA – "Kill Bill"; Taylor Swift – "Anti-Hero"; Rema and Selena Gomez – "Calm Down"	Taylor Swift – "Anti-Hero"; Cardi B featuring Megan Thee Stallion – "Bongos"; Doja Cat – "Paint the Town Red"; Little Simz – "Gorilla"; Miley Cyrus – "Flowers"; Olivia Rodrigo – "Vampire"; SZA – "Kill Bill"
Best Artist	Best Collaboration
Taylor Swift; Doja Cat; Miley Cyrus; Nicki Minaj; Olivia Rodrigo; SZA	Karol G and Shakira – "TQG"; Central Cee and Dave – "Sprinter"; David Guetta, Anne-Marie and Coi Leray – "Baby Don't Hurt Me"; Metro Boomin, The Weeknd and 21 Savage – "Creepin'"; PinkPantheress and Ice Spice – "Boy's a Liar Pt. 2"; Rema and Selena Gomez – "Calm Down"
Best New	Best Group
Peso Pluma; Coi Leray; Flo; Ice Spice; PinkPantheress; Reneé Rapp	No winner; Aespa; Flo; Jonas Brothers; Måneskin; NewJeans; OneRepublic; Seventeen; Tomorrow X Together
Best Pop	Best Rock
Billie Eilish; Dua Lipa; Ed Sheeran; Miley Cyrus; Olivia Rodrigo; Taylor Swift	Måneskin; Arctic Monkeys; Foo Fighters; Metallica; Red Hot Chili Peppers; The Killers
Best Alternative	Best Electronic
Lana Del Rey; Blur; Fall Out Boy; Paramore; Thirty Seconds to Mars; Yungblud	David Guetta; Alesso; Calvin Harris; Swedish House Mafia; Peggy Gou; Tiësto
Best Hip-Hop	Best R&B
Nicki Minaj; Cardi B; Central Cee; Lil Wayne; Lil Uzi Vert; Metro Boomin; Travis Scott	Chris Brown; Chlöe; Steve Lacy; Summer Walker; SZA; Usher
Best Latin	Best K-Pop
Anitta; Bad Bunny; Karol G; Peso Pluma; Rosalía; Shakira	Jungkook; Fifty Fifty; NewJeans; Seventeen; Stray Kids; Tomorrow X Together
Best Afrobeats	Best Live
Rema; Asake; Aya Nakamura; Ayra Starr; Burna Boy; Davido	Taylor Swift; Beyoncé; Burna Boy; Ed Sheeran; Måneskin; SZA; The Weeknd
Best Push	Biggest Fans
Tomorrow X Together; Flo Milli; Reneé Rapp; Sam Ryder; Armani White; Fletcher; Ice Spice; Flo; Lauren Spencer-Smith; Kaliii; GloRilla; Benson Boone	No winner; Anitta; Billie Eilish; Blackpink; Jung Kook; Nicki Minaj; Olivia Rodrigo; Sabrina Carpenter; Selena Gomez; Taylor Swift

=== Regional awards ===
Europe
Best Dutch Act	Best French Act
Flemming; Idaly; Kris Kross Amsterdam; S10; Zoë Tauran	Bigflo & Oli; Aime Simone; Aya Nakamura; Louane; Ninho; Slimane
Best German Act	Best Hungarian Act
Kontra K; Apache 207; Ayliva; Luciano; Nina Chuba; Ski Aggu	Ajsa Luna; Analog Balaton; Beton.Hofi; Co Lee; Hundred Sins
Best Israeli Act	Best Italian Act
No winner; Liad Meir; Noa Kirel; Anna Zak; Nunu; Shira Margalit	Måneskin; Annalisa; Elodie; Lazza; The Kolors
Best Nordic Act	Best Polish Act
Käärijä (Finland); Alessandra (Norway); Loreen (Sweden); Swedish House Mafia (Sweden); Zara Larsson (Sweden)	Doda; Kasia Nosowska; Mrozu; Sanah; Vito Bambino
Best Portuguese Act	Best Spanish Act
Bispo; Bárbara Tinoco; Carolina Deslandes; Marisa Liz; Piruka	Samantha Hudson; Abraham Mateo; Álvaro de Luna; Lola Índigo; Quevedo
Best Swiss Act	Best UK & Ireland Act
Gjon's Tears; Danitsa; KT Gorique; Monet192; Stress	Tom Grennan; Calvin Harris; Central Cee; PinkPantheress; Raye; Sam Smith
Africa
Best African Act
Diamond Platnumz (Tanzania); Asake (Nigeria); Burna Boy (Nigeria); Libianca (Cameroon); Tyler ICU (South Africa)
Asia
Best Indian Act	Best Asia Act
Tsumyoki; Dee MC; Divine; Mali; When Chai Met Toast	Be:First (Japan); Bright (Thailand); Moira (Philippines); Tiara Andini (Indonesia); Treasure (South Korea)
Australia and New Zealand
Best Australian Act	Best New Zealand Act
Kylie Minogue; Budjerah; G Flip; The Kid Laroi; Troye Sivan	Six60; Benee; JessB; Jolyon Petch; L.A.B
Americas
Best Brazilian Act	Best Canadian Act
Matuê; Anavitória; Kevin O Chris; Luísa Sonza; Manu Gavassi	Shania Twain; Charlotte Cardin; Drake; Jamie Fine; The Beaches
Best Caribbean Act	Best Latin America North Act
Young Miko; Eladio Carrión; Mora; Myke Towers; Rauw Alejandro	Kenia Os; Danna Paola; Kevin Kaarl; Siddhartha; Natanael Cano
Best Latin America Central Act	Best Latin America South Act
Feid; Blessd; Manuel Turizo; Ryan Castro; Sebastián Yatra	Lali; Bizarrap; Duki; Fito Páez; Nicki Nicole
Best US Act
Nicki Minaj; Doja Cat; Olivia Rodrigo; SZA; Taylor Swift
