= India's Got Latent =

Indian stand-up comedy show

- Genre: Stand-up comedy; Reality; Talent show; Variety show
- Created by: Samay raina and balraj singh and mamu
- Inspired by: Kill Tony; Got Talent
- Presented by: Samay Raina and Balraj Singh Ghai
- Country of origin: India
- Original language: Hindi
- No. of seasons: 2
- No. of episodes: 21 (+12 bonus episodes)

Production
- Editor: Pratham Sagar
- Camera setup: Multi-camera
- Running time: 43–67 minutes 36–54 minutes (Bonus episodes)
- Production company: Perception Media

Original release
- Network: YouTube; Netflix
- Release: 14 June 2024 – present

India's Got Latent is an Indian Hindi comedy talent show hosted by Samay Raina on YouTube since 2024. Inspired by the international Got Talent franchise and Kill Tony, it features a wide variety of acts including singing, dancing, magic, and comedy.

On 12 February 2025, Raina called off the show during the first season and made all episodes private on YouTube, in the aftermath of a controversy sparked by obscene comments made by podcaster Ranveer Allahbadia. The show returned for its second season in June 2026 on YouTube and Netflix.

== History ==
India's Got Latent was launched on June 14, 2024, by Samay Raina on his YouTube channel. Raina also launched an India's Got Latent app on iOS and Android. On 10 February 2025, podcaster Ranveer Allahbadia, known as BeerBiceps, appearing as a guest judge in India's Got Latent asked the following question to a contestant: "Would you rather watch your parents have sex every day for the rest of your life or join in once to make it stop forever?". Due to its vulgar nature, various personalities involved in the episode faced public criticism as well as having FIR filed against for "promoting obscenity" and using offensive language during which all its episodes were made private from YouTube. The controversy as well as the politicized nature of the incident lead to cancellation of the show, arrest two personalities involved in the show who have been granted bail and protection from arrest, death threats including a bounty by a far-right Hindutva group, rape and acid attack threats on a female cast member, as well as Supreme Court recommendation for Union to draft regulations for online content. The incident has sparked criticism of hypocrisy of the judiciary and police about not taking any legal action against political figures who have made derogatory comments about women and hate-speech in the past as well as concerns of the BJP government spreading moral panic and using the controversy to tighten internet censorship in India.

In November 2025, Raina revealed that he was planning to renew the show for a second season, almost four months after clips of the episodes resurfaced on YouTube through a different channel.

In April 2026, he released a stand-up special on YouTube, titled Still Alive, where he remarked that "his show's first season couldn't have ended on a higher note" and revealed that a second season of the show was in the works.

In June 2026, speculation about the release of the second season of India's Got Latent increased after Netflix India shared a promotional post featuring Raina's bodyguard. Shortly after, Raina announced that the show will be streaming on Netflix as well as YouTube, with the first episode set to release on June 20, 2026.

The first episode of the second season was released on 20 June 2026 simultaneously on YouTube and Netflix, featuring Alia Bhatt and Sharvari as guest judges while promoting their film Alpha.

According to Mint, the premiere episode crossed fifteen million views within hours of its release. New episodes were announced to be released every two weeks on both platforms.

== Format ==
The format of India's Got Latent follows a similar structure to other shows in the Got Talent franchise and that of Kill Tony. Contestants perform in front of a panel of judges, who evaluate their acts.

=== Auditions ===
The show begins with a nationwide audition process, where contestants from various cities and towns upload their clip online while performing an act and is reviewed by the selection committee before getting called to the show for stage performance.

=== Winner mechanism ===
The unique aspect of India's Got Latent is its contestant rating system. Before each performance, contestants have to rate themselves. If the average rating given by the judge panel after the performance matches the contestant's self-rating, the contestant wins.

== Judges and hosts ==
The judging panel typically consists of celebrities from the Indian entertainment industry. Each judge provides feedback on the performances, while the host interacts with contestants and the audience.

Host
Guest Host
Judge
Guest Judge

Cast member	Season 1 (2024)																		Season 2 (2026)															Ref.
Cast member	Episode																																	Ref.
Cast member	1	1+	2	2+	3	3+	4	4+	5	5+	6	6+	7	8	9	10	11	12	1	2	3	1+	4	2+	5	3+	6	4+	7	5+	8	6+	9	Ref.
Samay Raina	●	●	●	●	●	●	●	●	●	●	●	●	●	●	●	●	●	●	●	●	●	●	●	●	●	●	●	●	●	●	●	●	●	
Balraj Singh Ghai	●	●	●	●	●	●	●	●	●		●		●		●	●		●	●	●							●	●				●	●	
Raftaar	●																																●	
Sahil Kale	●	●																															●	
Arpit Bala		●																													●			
Bhappa		●																																
Aminjaz		●																																
Anshu Bisht			●																															
Joke Singh			●								●															●								
Karan Singh			●																															
Badshah				●																				●										
Siddhant Chaturvedi				●																														
Gursimran Khamba				●																														
Urfi Javed					●																													
Ashish Solanki					●													●	●													●		
Yashraj					●													●			●													
Avika Gor						●																												
Devesh Dixit						●																												
Shashwat Maheshwari						●																												
Maheep Singh							●											●																
Amit Tandon							●																											
Neeti Palta							●																											
Seedhe Maut								●																										
Madhur Virli								●																							●			
Kaustubh Agarwal								●																					●					
Kunal Kamra									●																									
Atul Khatri									●																									
Rohan Joshi										●												●												
Sahil Shah										●																								
Vaibhav Munjal										●																								
Chandni Ghai										●																								
Vipul Goyal											●																							
Sonali Thakker											●																							
Ranveer Allahbadia												●																						
Ashish Chanchalani												●																						
Apoorva Mukhija												●																						
Jaspreet Singh												●																						
Saurabh Pandey													●																					
Rahgir (singer)													●																					
Ravi Gupta													●															●						
Poonam Pandey														●																				
Vidit Gujrathi														●																				
Vivek Desai														●																				
Sagar Shah														●																				
Manan Desai															●																			
Deepak Kalal															●													●						
Agu Stanley Chiedozie															●													●						
Raghu Ram																●					●													
Tanmay Bhat																●					●		●								●			
Dr. Sid Warrier																●																		
Bharti Singh																	●																	
Haarsh Limbachiyaa																	●			●				●										
Drew Hicks																	●																	
Tony Kakkar																	●																	
Rakhi Sawant																		●									●							
Yuzvendra Chahal																																		
Farah Khan																																		
KRSNA																																		
Bhuvan Bam																													●					
Ahsaas Channa																																		
Rahul Dua																							●											
Vishal Dadlani																					●													
Sumaira Shaikh																																		
Manhar Seth																																		
Dalip Tahil																																		
Ashish Vidyarthi																																		
Mallika Sherawat																																		
Munawar Faruqui																						●												
Varun Thakur																																		
Anubhav Singh Bassi																																		
Gurleen Pannu																							●											
Sharvari																			●															
Alia Bhatt																			●															
Chandan Prabhakar																				●														
Kiku Sharda																				●														
Raghav Juyal																						●												
Niharika NM																						●												
Karan Aujla																							●											
Sourav Joshi																								●										
Rajat Sood																								●						●				
Archana Puran Singh																									●									
Orhan Awatramani																									●									
Sharon Verma																									●	●								
Nishant Suri																									●									
Varun Dhawan																										●								
Medha Shankr																										●								
Ashneer Grover																											●							
Kushagra Srivastav																											●							
Mukesh Chhabra																													●					
Nawazuddin Siddiqui																													●					
Suhani Shah																														●				
Ayushmann Khurrana																														●				
Aditya Kulshreshth																														●				
MC Stan																															●			
Huma Qureshi																																●		
Krushna Abhishek																																●		

Note: "+" represents bonus episodes.

== Summary of each season ==
=== Season 1 ===
The first season premiered on YouTube in mid-2024 as an independent digital comedy-reality show. Created, hosted, and self-produced by Raina, the season introduced a satirical alternative to mainstream Indian talent shows.

Conducted in The Habitat, Mumbai, the format required contestants to showcase raw, bizarre or highly niche "latent" skills followed by an immediate self-evaluation round where they match their score with the average score of the judge panel to win a cash prize. Over its 12-episode run, accompanied by 6 bonus episodes, the show built a massive internet cult following due to its dark humor, unfiltered contestant roasts and the judge panel, which saw comedians like Tanmay Bhat, Kunal Kamra, and Rohan Joshi grace the show.

=== Season 2 ===
Following a brief period of hiatus, caused by a wave of backlash which resulted in the deletion of all the episodes from the first season, the second season premiered on June 20, 2026.

In a landmark distribution deal for Indian digital indie shows, the season adopted a high-profile dual platform simulcast, premiering episodes concurrently across both Netflix for global audiences and YouTube for free tier streamers. Alongside core panelists Samay Raina and Balraj Singh Ghai, the premiere expanded its cultural footprint by incorporating mainstream Bollywood celebrities into the judging panel, featuring Alia Bhatt and Sharvari to critique the eccentric lineup of performers.

== Famous contestants ==
- Naman Arora
- Keshav Jha
- Deepak Yadav (DDSRY)
- Sharon Verma (became judge in season 2)
- Santosh Patra
- Bhavya Shah
- Anant Upadhyay
- Puneet Superstar
- Kushal Bhanushali
- Banti Banerjee
- Jessy Nabam
- Sukrut Deo
- Avinash Agarwal
- Geni Kamki
- Sakshi Jha
- Chello Meme

== Winner ==
Episode	Winner
Season 1
1	Jyoti Sharma, Vedant Modi
2	Anant Upadhyay, Suryansh Pandey & Veer, and Ekant Sawant (bonus episode)
3	Deepak Yadav (DDSRY)
4	Hard Shivam, Kartikey & Deep (bonus episode)
5	Naman Arora, and Poshak Dua (bonus episode)
6	Sewashree Boruah, and Karan Shah (bonus episode)
7	Parneet Singh
8	Pravin Bhairwa
9	Kushal Bhanushali
10	Banti Banerjee, Mysterious Kayden
11	Anmol Sharma, Kushal Bhanushali
12	Yuvraj Gupta, Khushi Saini
Season 2
1	Avinash Aggarwal
2	Kapil Dinkar
3	Vishal Pathak
4	Gaurav Madan
5	Fadhili Ally Pazi (bonus episode)
6	Chello Meme
7	Vijay Poriya (Netflix-only episode)
8	Prateik Bhardwaj
9	Mrugank Pathare, Kanisha Malhotra, Sachin Sonawani (bonus episode)
10	Odi Ji
11	Bhagyashree Tarke (Netflix-only episode)

== Reception ==
India's Got Latent has gained popularity for its diversity in showcasing talent from different regions of India. The show has been praised for its ability to discover unique talents that might not have been recognized in mainstream entertainment and also the amalgamation of various celebrities as judges which has proved to induce laughter and popularity.

India's Got Latent was included in DNA's list of the top 5 crazy shows on YouTube in 2024.

== YouTube earnings ==
India's Got Latent was estimated to earn over ₹1.5 crore($159,000)per month from YouTube memberships, with additional revenue generated from in-stream advertisements on each episode.

== Controversies ==
The show has received media attention for various antics:

- Rakhi Sawant threw a chair on stage after getting into an argument with comedian Maheep Singh on an episode of India's Got Latent. Sawant also made a derogatory remark about Singh, after which he left the stage. The episode was eventually released on YouTube as the twelfth episode on New Year's Eve 2024, after undergoing the removal of the scene.
- During Santosh Patra's performance in sixth episode, the judges endorsed derogatory remarks about disabled people.
- During one of the performances on India's Got Latent, some of the contestants endorsed derogatory remarks on guest judge Urfi Javed, which included "slut-shaming" her, and comparing her with adult actress Mia Khalifa, which led to her walking off the show. Samay Raina, the host of the show, did not intervene and Balraj Ghai was called in to replace her for the last two performances.
- Banti Banerjee, a contestant and a winner on the tenth episode, made several controversial remarks during her performance that were initially endorsed by the judges and audience but later sparked online debate and outrage. Banerjee referenced Deepika Padukone's recent experience of becoming a mother and past struggles with depression. Banerjee said, "Deepika Padukone also became a mother recently, right? Great. Now she knows what depression really looks like. Actual depression happens when your sleep breaks, and your kid wakes in the middle of the night at 3 am and the kid wants to eat, poop, or play, at any order." Banerjee also said she was intentionally mocking the actor's depression due to her breakup. Raina also responded to the outrage, by saying, "To everyone who is outraging on X, one request: Could you please outrage in my YouTube comment section so I get some ad revenue from the traction, at least." Also during her performance, Banerjee referenced the 2024 Kolkata rape and murder, which was also deemed insensitive and offensive: "Any Bengalis in the house? See, sab so rahe hain. Nahi. Thak gaye honge na candle march karte karte (Bengalis are sleeping! Let them. Must be tired by holding candle march protests)."
- The fifth bonus episode, which debuted in June 2024, faced criticism over racist comments made about Arunachal Pradesh. Contestant Jessy Nabam, a native of the state, joked that her people consume dog meat, and sometimes even their own pets. This remark prompted a resident of Arunachal Pradesh to file a complaint, reportedly leading to an FIR being registered, which termed her comments as derogatory and defamatory towards the indigenous people of Arunachal Pradesh.
- Comedian Jaspreet Singh has sparked significant outrage with a racist joke about Kerala, drawing sharp criticism from Malayalis across social media in the sixth bonus episode and overall, the last episode of the show. Singh said, "Kerala saar...100% literacy, saar!" This incident slowly gained momentum, with many condemning the joke as offensive and derogatory to Kerala's literacy.
- A video clip resurfaced online where a audience member's girlfriend left the show in tears because her father was going through a heart attack (described as a 'minor heart attack' by contestant) but the contestant remained seated, unbothered, to which Raina joked, "Bhai, kandha dega tabhi wo head degi bhai, aise nahi degi wo [Brother, if you don't give her a shoulder to cry on, she won't give you the head]." Raina received renewed backlash from the joke. People online compared the joke to remarks voiced by audience member, Himanshu Jangra, at Pranit More's crowdwork show.

=== Obscenity case against Ranveer Allahbadia ===
The sixth bonus episode was particularly fateful. Podcaster Ranveer Allahbadia, popularly known as BeerBiceps, appeared as a guest judge alongside YouTuber Ashish Chanchlani, social media influencer Apoorva Mukhija, and comedian Jaspreet Singh. During the episode, Allahbadia asked a contestant, "Would you rather watch your parents have sex every day for the rest of your life or join in once to make it stop forever?" The remark led to significant backlash on social media. A police complaint was filed against Allahbadia for "promoting obscenity" and using offensive language. The complaint was submitted to the Commissioner of the Mumbai Police and the National Commission for Women, which led to an inquiry and the registration of an FIR against Allahbadia, as well as Apoorva Mukhija and comedian Samay Raina.

Devendra Fadnavis, a leader in the centre-right to right-wing (and even far-right) Bharatiya Janata Party (BJP) and the Chief Minister of Maharashtra, commented on the incident, stating,

I have come to know about it. I haven't seen it yet. Things have been said and presented in the wrong way. Everyone has freedom of speech, but our freedom ends when we encroach upon the freedom of others... In our society, we have certain rules, and if someone violates them, it is absolutely wrong, and action should be taken against them.

Himanta Biswa Sarma, another BJP leader and the Chief Minister of Assam, announced that a First information report (FIR) had been filed by the Guwahati police against the individuals involved in the incident for promoting obscenity and engaging in inappropriate discussions.

On 10 February 2025, Allahbadia issued a video in which he stated that the controversial segments had been removed from the show, acknowledging that the attempt at humor was not well received. On 12 February 2025, Raina removed all episodes of India's Got Latent from his YouTube channel, stating that he would fully cooperate with the authorities to ensure a fair inquiry. Following this, the Maharashtra Police filled a complaint against Raina and Allahbadia for "creating obscene content" and airing it on the show's YouTube channel.

Apoorva Mukhija reported on social media about receiving threats of being raped and murdered on her social media accounts due to her presence at that episode. She was dropped from the list of guests for the International Indian Film Academy Awards in Jaipur after the Karni Sena publicly declared its intention to physically assault her in protest of her actions if she arrived in the state. A far-right Hindu outfit in Gwalior declared a bounty of ₹1 lakh to cut off Allahabadia's tongue. Mukhija also exposed about death and rape threats, as well as acid attacks from several trolls for her conduct in an interview and sharing screenshots months later.

The entire controversy around Allahbadia's comments was fanned into a moral panic by India's pro-government media about Indian youth being corrupted by decadent Western values through social media, after it appeared that Allahbadia had copied that infamous joke from an Australian YouTube channel called The OG Crew where it was directed by an Australian stand-up comedian Sammy Walsh towards Alan Fang, two weeks before Allahbadia endorsed it on the show. Some critics have also accused the law enforcement authorities and judiciary of using the controversy as a smokescreen to divert attention from other pressing problems, such as unemployment, corruption, rape and pollution, and the imposition of President's rule in Manipur due to ethnic riots, and questioned the hypocrisy of the judiciary and police about not taking any legal action against political figures who have made derogatory comments about women and hate-speech in the past. Concerns have been raised that the controversy might be used by the BJP government to tighten Internet censorship in India.

On 14 February 2025, a parliamentary committee wrote to the Ministry of Information & Broadcasting seeking laws to regulate digital content like podcasts and OTTs in the light of this incident. Supreme Court Judge Surya Kant has remarked that "there is nothing like a fundamental right on a platter," stating that citizens must fulfill their "duty" in order to enjoy their fundamental rights.

On 3 March 2025, Allahbadia was allowed by the Supreme Court to resume airing his podcast The Ranveer Show on YouTube, on the condition that he would maintain decency on his show. On 7 March 2025, Allahbadia was shown to be dragged by officers of Guwahati Police, after he appeared to give his statements following warrants and summons; the maltreatment by dragging was heavily criticized by several internet users. On 8 March 2025, the Gauhati High Court granted anticipatory bail to Ashish Chanchlani in the matter.

In April 2026, Raina revealed in his debut standup special, Still Alive, that Allahbadia asked the same question at least eight times during the 5-hour event, but he chose to keep only one instance of him asking the question, in the edited version of the episode, which was released on YouTube.

== See also ==
- India's Got Talent
