= Yashraj =

Indian rapper, writer and composer (born 2000)

- Born: Yashraj Mehra; 28 March 2000 (age 26); Mumbai, India
- Occupations: Rapper; Writer; Composer; Singer
- Years active: 2019–present
- Musical career
- Genres: Bollywood; Desi hip hop; R&B; Pop; Urban; Hip hop
- Label: Universal Music India

Yashraj Mehra, better known as Yashraj is an Indian rapper, writer, and composer. He is primarily known for his songs like "Ishq Nachaawe" from the film Kho Gaye Hum Kahan, "Murder Mubarak- Title Track" from the film Murder Mubarak, and his single tracks like "Hausla", "Dhundhala", "Gabbar, "DLL" and "Daae / Baae". He has featured in Vogue, Forbes India and Grazia Magazine.

== Career ==
=== 2019-2022: Career beginnings and "Dhundhala" ===
Yashraj made his debut in the Indian hip-hop scene in April 2020 with the release of his debut EP titled Azaad Hu Mein. The EP, whose theme revolved around "resolving the inner conflict first, in order to fight the world in any given situation" paved the way for him to get established as an up-and-coming rapper, as he released various singles like "Do Khidkiyaan", "Khel", "Galat / Sahi", "DLL", "Part of Me", among others. He broke into the mainstream hip-hop scene with his track "Hausla", featuring Burrah and produced by Dropped Out. Accompanying his solo single releases, most of which were produced by fellow collaborator Dropped Out, he also became known for his commercially successful collaborations on various songs spanning different genres like "Raakh" with Karan Kanchan, "Kanipatu" with Rishi Rich, "Kho Gaya" with Zaeden, and "Dhundhala" with Talwiinder. "Dhundhala" became a global mainstream hit, amassing over 100 million streams on Spotify. In 2022, he released his second EP, Takiya Kalaam, featuring tracks produced by Dropped Out, Lambo Drive, Karonik and Akash Shravan.

=== 2023-present: Collaborations and mainstream success ===
In 2023, Yashraj followed with releasing the single, Ladke Convict, consisting of two songs, which featured Chaar Diwaari and Hanumankind. He also collaborated with other artists throughout the year, including Bharg, Kshmr, Yungsta and Tsumyoki. He also continued to collaborate with artists across genres, including "Roshni" with Lisa Mishra and "Hiir" with Armaan Malik.

In February 2024, Yashraj performed at NSCI SVP stadium alongside fellow rapper Dino James as a supporting act for American rapper G-Eazy's performance. In June 2024, Yashraj collaborated with Chaar Diwaari for the song "Dumb Biryani" to promote Arhaan Khan, Dev Raiyani, and Arush Verma's YouTube project Dumb Biryani. In July 2024, he released his third EP, Meri Jaan Pehle Naach, featuring disco pop and Hindi film music influences. It was preceded by the release of three lead singles from the album, "Daae/Baae", "GABBAR", and "Kaayda/Faayda". In the same year, he sung the title track for the film Murder Mubarak and the song "Ishq Nachaawe" for the film Kho Gaye Hum Kahan. He was featured in Rolling Stone India's first edition of the "Future of Music" list in 2024. In December 2024, he released the track "Sanatan", a dedication to his hometown. The track focused on the themes of “middle-class mindset” to “societal expectations” and "personal ambitions revolving around being a hip-hop artist who are now more than ever likely to get typecast".

In 2025, he released his fourth EP, 3P, which contained 3 songs, featuring production from NEVERSOBER and Talal Qureshi. In the same year, he was featured on the song "Wheel of Time", from the album, Sounds of Kumbha, by Grammy-nominated producer Siddhant Bhatia alongside Ajay Prasanna and Aditya Ghadvi. The album went on to be nominated at the 68th Annual Grammy Awards in the category for Best Global Music Album. In the same year, he also collaborated with KRSNA on "Talk My Shit/Guarantee", Badshah on "DAF", and Calm on "TOP FLOOR SHiii". He also appeared as a guest judge on the show, India's Got Latent in the first and second season.

In 2026, he was included in Forbes India's 30 Under 30 list. He released the track "Mujhe Yeh Gaana Pasand Hai", to build anticipation for his forthcoming album. In the same year, he performed at the second edition of the 3-on-3 celebrity basketball game, BUDX NBA House, held at Bharat Mandapam in New Delhi, alongside fellow rappers Nav and Reble. He released his debut album, Mayanagri, in collaboration with Dropped Out, in November 2026. The album dealt with various themes, described by Radio and Music as "an introspective journey through identity, ambition, friendship and the realities of finding your place in an industry that rarely slows down".

== Artistry ==
Yashraj cites Nas, André 3000, J. Cole, Drake, ASAP Rocky, Divine, Naezy and Tyga as major inspirations.

== Discography ==
=== Albums and EPs ===
Title	Details
Azaad Hu Mein	Released: 3 April 2020; Formats: Digital download, streaming
Takiya Kalaam	Released: 19 August 2022; Formats: Digital download, streaming
Meri Jaan Pehle Naach	Released: 15 July 2024; Formats: Digital download, streaming
3P	Released: 17 March 2025; Formats: Digital download, streaming
Mayanagri	Released: 11 November 2026; Formats: Digital download, streaming

=== Film soundtracks ===
Year	Film	Title	Artist(s)	Lyrics	Composer(s)	Notes
2024	Murder Mubarak	"Murder Mubarak (Title Track)"	Sachin–Jigar, Prakriti Kakar, Yashraj	Sachin–Jigar, Yashraj	Sachin–Jigar	
2024	Kho Gaye Hum Kahan	"Ishq Nachaawe"	Rashmeet Kaur, Yashraj	Yashraj, Dhrruv Yogi	Rashmeet Kaur, Karan Kanchan	

=== Singles and collaborations ===
Title	Year	Album
"Gully Beat Cypher" (D-Cypher, Yashraj, Vrindam, Siyaahi and Zedano)	2019	Non-album single
"Do Khidkiyaan" (Yashraj featuring Dropped Out)	2020	Non-album single
"Kanipatu" (Yashraj featuring Rishi Rich)	2020	Non-album single
"Khel" (Yashraj featuring Manin)	2020	Non-album single
"Hausla" (Yashraj featuring Dropped Out and Burrah)	2020	Non-album single
"Galat/Sahi" (Yashraj featuring Dropped Out)	2020	Non-album single
"VN1 (Seekh)"	2021	Non-album single
"12." (Yashraj featuring Karm Solah)	2021	Non-album single
"Kho Gaya" (Zaeden featuring Yashraj and AAKASH)	2021	Genesis 1:1
"DLL" (Yashraj featuring Katoptris)	2021	Non-album single
"VN2 (Mauke)" (Yashraj featuring Karonik)	2021	Non-album single
"Ek Saath" (Yashraj featuring Dropped Out)	2021	Non-album single
"Part of Me"	2021	Non-album single
"Been Too Long"	2021	Non-album single
"VN3 (Udaan)" (Yashraj featuring Manin)	2021	Non-album single
"Complicated" (Yashraj featuring Dropped Out and Ramya Pothuri)	2021	Non-album single
"Raakh" (Yashraj featuring Karan Kanchan and Dropped Out)	2021	Non-album single
"Besabar" (Yashraj featuring Karonik)	2021	Non-album single
"Dhundhala" (Yashraj featuring Talwiinder and Dropped Out)	2022	Non-album single
"Ruh" (Lost Stories featuring Yashraj and Nikhita Gandhi)	2022	Non-album single
"Farzi Ghalib" (Yashraj featuring Manin)	2022	Non-album single
"Bura/Bhala" (Yashraj featuring Akash Shravan)	2022	Non-album single
"MITTI" (Chaar Diwaari featuring Yashraj)	2022	Teri Maiyat Ke Gaane
"VN4 (Gati)" (Yashraj featuring Robu)	2023	Non-album single
"Bevda Freestyle" (Yashraj featuring Zero Chill)	2023	Non-album single
"Bombay Coast" (Yashraj featuring MLHVR, Adil and Deorachit)	2023	Non-album single
"Savera" (Yungsta featuring Sez on the Beat and Yashraj)	2023	Meen
"Masroor" (Yashraj featuring Katoptris)	2023	Non-album single
"THAT'S A FACT!" (Yashraj featuring Hanumankind)	2023	Ladke Convict
"IDENTITY THEFT." (Yashraj featuring Chaar Diwaari)	2023	Ladke Convict
"Baith Jaao" (Yashraj featuring Akash Shravan)	2023	Non-album single
"Enemies" (KSHMR featuring Hanumankind and Yashraj)	2023	Karam
"stop calling me" (Yashraj featuring Kayan)	2023	Non-album single
"Boldu Sach" (Bharg featuring Yashraj)	2023	Nikamma
"BREAKSHIT!" (Tsumyoki featuring Calm and Yashraj)	2023	A Message From The Moon (Deluxe)
"Toast"	2024	Non-album single
"Roshni" (Lisa Mishra featuring Yashraj and Charan)	2024	Sorry, I'm Late
"Daae / Baae" (Yashraj featuring Dropped Out)	2024	Meri Jaan Pehle Naach
"Gabbar" (Yashraj featuring PUNA)	2024	Meri Jaan Pehle Naach
"Kaayda/Faayda" (Yashraj featuring Akash Shravan and bebhumika)	2024	Meri Jaan Pehle Naach
"SUITS & STREETS" (King featuring Yashraj and Gravity)	2024	Monopoly Moves
"Tu Hai Nayaa" (Yashraj featuring bebhumika and Deorachit)	2024	Non-album single
"DEHSHAT HO" (Raftaar featuring Yashraj)	2024	Hard Drive Vol. 2
"SANATAN" (Yashraj featuring NEVERSOBER)	2024	Non-album single
"Talk My Shit/Guarantee" (Krsna featuring Yashraj and NEVERSOBER)	2025	Yours Truly
"Wheel of Time" (Siddhant Bhatia featuring Ajay Prasanna, Yashraj and Aditya Ghadvi)	2025	Sounds of Kumbha
"TOP FLOOR SHiii" (Yashraj featuring Calm and NEVERSOBER)	2025	Non-album single
"DAF" (Yashraj featuring Badshah)	2025	Non-album single
"Mujhe Yeh Gaana Pasand Hai"	2026	Non-album single
"TAX"	2026	Non-album single

== Accolades ==
Award	Year	Recipient(s) and nominee(s)	Category	Result	Ref
TIMD Awards (Note: TIMD Awards is an independent music award given by The Indian Music Diaries.)	2024	Ladke Convict	Best Hip-Hop Release Of The Year	Won	
Grammy Awards	2026	Sounds of Kumbha (as featuring artist)	Best Global Music Album	Nominated	
