= Ron Hayon =

Israeli rapper (born 2006)

Ron Hayon כפיר צפריר

Background information
- Born: 22 February 2006 (age 20); Rishon LeZion, Israel
- Genre: hip hop
- Occupations: Singer, rapper, songwriter, producer
- Years active: 2022–present

Ron Hayon (Hebrew: רון חיון; February 22, 2006) is an Israeli rapper. Hayon is known for combining rap and hip-hop with elements of Israeli hip-hop.

== Biography ==
Hayon grew up in Rishon LeZion. He studied at the Bnei Akiva yeshiva in Rishon LeZion. He began his musical career at the age of 16, in 2022, by releasing his first single, "Ebrenu Homon," and starting to create online content, primarily on TikTok. Hayon completed his mandatory military service in the IDF. In May 2025, he was undergoing Tironu the initial period of military training and while he was in training, his song "Achat MiMillion" reached number one on the Israeli music charts.

== Musical career ==
A video in which Hayon performs the first part of the track "Distance" became a major success on the Internet; the rapper and producer Duda subsequently invited him to record and produce this track, as well as his debut album. He later released the track "Balagan" in collaboration with the rapper Duda. That same year, he also featured on the track "Elijah" by the rapper Izzy, taken from the album.

Furthermore, Hayon has served as an opening act for numerous rappers, including Mavo HaDuda'im, Duda, Nimi Nim, Kfir Tsafrir, and Lukach, among others. In April 2023, a track by Hayon and rapper Liad Meir, titled "Flow Shel Tambal 2," was released. The song went viral, entering the "Hitlist" chart from the media outlet Mako as well as the weekly "HaAsiriya" ("The Top 10") chart on the radio station Kan Gimel, while garnering millions of streams across various platforms. To date, "Flow Shel Tambal 2" is considered one of Ron Hayon most successful singles and one of the most notable collaborations within the new generation.

On February 9, 2025, Hayon released the single "Achat Memilyon," produced by Duda, who also co-wrote the lyrics alongside Ziv Shavit and Liad Meir. The song's official music video was directed and edited by Yoav Tsadikov. At its peak, the song reached the number-one spot on the Mako Hitlist as well as the top position on the official Galgalatz chart.

On June 8, he appeared on Liad Meir album Prachim VeNagchot, on the track "Yeled Ra". On July 6, he released the single "Shoneh MeHaNof", produced by Duda and co-written with Ziv Shavit and Liad Meir. The music video for the song was directed and edited by Yoav Zadikov. On September 11, alongside Duda, he performed a mashup of their tracks "Achat MiMillion" and "Lo Lehamtzi" which also incorporated the song "Malkat HaDor" by Omer Adam for the annual Galgalatz year end chart.

On June 8, 2026, he released the single "Gever Morokai" (Moroccan Man). On July 12, the soundtrack for the series HaPshut'a was released; Ron is featured on the fifth track, "Obsessivit", alongside Liad Meir.

== Discography ==
=== Albums ===
- 2024: 16 (אלבום)

=== EP ===
- 2024: דיסטאנס
- 2024: תאריך יציאה
- 2024: תאריך יציאה
- 2024: תאריך יציאה
