= Tsumyoki =

Indian rapper (born 2001)

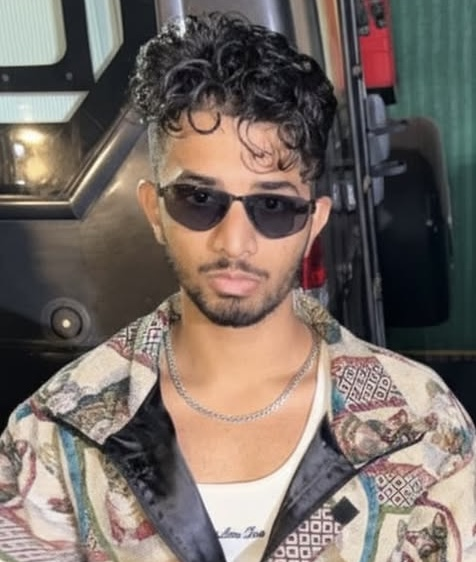
- Tsumyoki in 2026
- Born: Nathan Joseph Mendes; 2 June 2001 (age 25); Margao, Goa, India
- Other names: Yoki; Gamsham Pakleshwali Bagarjack Joshi Jogi Kumar Lover The II
- Education: St. Xavier's College, Mapusa (B.A.)
- Musical career
- Origin: Margao, South Goa
- Genres: Hip hop; pop; folk; indie
- Occupations: Rapper; singer-songwriter; record producer
- Instruments: Vocals; guitar; piano; ukulele
- Years active: 2018–present
- Label: Gully Gang
- Member of: Goa Trap Culture
- Website: www.tsumyoki.com

Nathan Joseph Mendes (born 2 June 2001), known professionally as Tsumyoki (Note: (pronounced sue-ma-yoki)) or simply Yoki, is an Indian rapper, singer-songwriter, and record producer. He gained popularity from his single track release, "White Tee" (2019), and received further media attention through his album Daboij (2021), the EP Way Too Messy (2021), featuring fellow Goan rapper Kidd Mange, and the single "Pink Blue" (2022), featuring Bharg. According to Tsumyoki, his stage name alludes to ideas of "vision, productivity, and a positive mindset".

Tsumyoki is one of the leading artists from Goa and is credited for revolutionizing the English genre of Hip hop music in the Indian coastal state of Goa. He is the first Goan music artist and the youngest member at age 19, to be signed by DIVINE's record label, Gully Gang Records in 2021. He was also featured in Goan Insider's 50 Most Influential People of 2021 and has been described by ItsGoa magazine as Goa's best rapper.

== Early life ==
Nathan Joseph Mendes was born on 2 June 2001 in Margao, Goa, to Gianna and Sanjeev Mendes. He has an elder sister, Sneha, a filmmaker based in New York City, U.S. He completed his Higher Secondary School Certificate (HSSC) from The King's School in São José de Areal, Goa. He later graduated with a Bachelor of Arts degree from St. Xavier's College, Mapusa.

Tsumyoki's maternal grandfather, Joe, was also a musician and died in 2018. He was raised in a family influenced by Portuguese culture, as Goa was formerly a Portuguese territory. During his childhood, he was exposed to a diverse range of musical traditions, including Afrobeats and music from Portugal and Brazil.

== Career ==
=== 2018–2019: Early career ===
Tsumyoki started his career in music in his late teenage years, beginning at age 17. His primary aim was to explore various music genres beyond just rap. He credits his mother and family for supporting him throughout his musical career and considers artists like XXXTentacion, Juice WRLD, Drake, Eminem, Post Malone, Ski Mask the Slump God and Michael Jackson as his role models. During an interview, Tsumyoki shared how he commenced his career with ₹8,000 (equivalent to ₹12,000 or US$120 in 2026), struggling to afford essential technical equipment. He had to depend on his mother as he needed more money to start his musical career with proper equipment. He then performed for her to convince her to pay for his equipment.

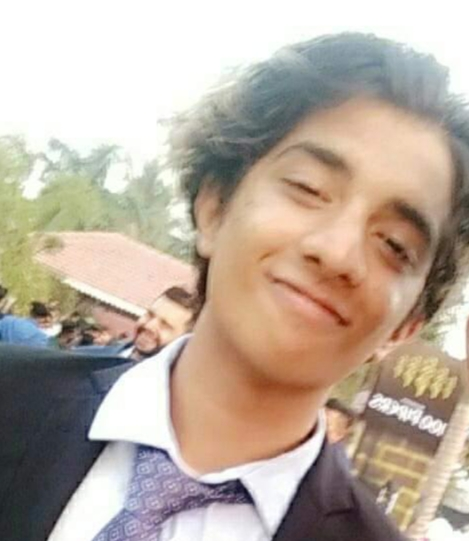
Tsumyoki in 2020

Everyone thinks Tsumyoki has some deep meaning, but I put my meaning in my music rather than in my name. Talking about the name, well, I woke up one day, looked at myself in the mirror and that’s how I got it. It does, however, have Japanese influence. It was a little uncomfortable at first, but then I stuck by the name and it slowly became popular.

— Tsumyoki, explaining the background of his stage name

Tsumyoki first began pursuing music as a hobby in 11th grade. He discussed the difficulties he encountered when trying to establish himself in the rap scene with The Navhind Times, recounting instances of waiting outside clubs with a USB flash drive containing his music in the hopes of catching the attention of popular artists. In addition, he notes the lack of widespread backing for indigenous musicians in Goa who crafted their own music, requiring him to work towards gaining visibility.

=== 2019–2020: Rise to success ===
Tsumyoki's breakthrough came from his single track release, "White Tee", in 2019. The idea behind the track was a hook, "White Tee, Bish get off”, he had in mind. The music video was mainly shot in Fatorda and other locations, featuring participation from several of his supporters. Tsumyoki further stated in an interview that, "White Tee signifies a mindset, for example, if you're wearing something white, you ought to not get dirty. Similarly, it means you don't need people's negativity affecting your perspective". At the age of 18, Tsumyoki started performing at clubs and judged several college events. One of his first two gigs was with DJ Skeletron. Tsumyoki and the latter collaborated in the single track "Go Hard" which was released on 4 August 2019. Following this, a gastropub in Candolim offered him his first show. In October 2019, Tsumyoki scheduled the release of the music video for "Save Me" but the project was subsequently postponed. His music is influenced by American culture, and he has sought to incorporate more elements of Indian culture into his work.

In November 2020, Tsumyoki produced "Ketta", a single by Bongisio, a Merces based music artist. The single was mastered and recorded by 2jaym. Before Tsumyoki embarked on his music career, he lacked any Goan rappers to serve as influences since there were no popular artists in that category during that period. He has collaborated with local music artists, producers and influencers like JD, 2Jaym, Elttwo, ZaDaRapper and ZB Memes.

=== 2021–present: Way Too Messy, A Message from the Moon and other work ===
On 4 September 2021, Tsumyoki released his 15-minute maiden EP, Way Too Messy, it included five tracks with themes of cancel culture, ambition and self discovery. The inspiration behind it was when he and Kidd Mange, were invited to the Gully Gang camp, wherein they were involved in making music. The decision to produce the EP was made at that juncture, and it was well-received by the Gully Gang team. Within two days, three songs were finalized, and the remaining two were subsequently incorporated. Tsumyoki participated in the 2021 Goa Rap Cypher, where he played a role in both production and performance. Together with nine local artists, they used this platform to raise awareness about significant challenges such as the Mollem situation affecting the region of Goa.

Tsumyoki with his MTV EMA award, 2024

In 2022, Tsumyoki released the upbeat single "Pink Blue" featuring Bharg, which became a hit and has amassed 9 million streams on Spotify as of January 2026.

On 2 June 2023, Tsumyoki released his third studio album, A Message from the Moon, which toggles between the soft pop, afropop, and trap sounds. In the same year, in September, he released the deluxe version of the album which featured four new tracks, featuring Bharg, rappers Calm, Yashraj, and Connor Price, including a remix of "Pink Blue", which featured Price.

In May 2024, Tsumyoki released the single, "WHAT CAN I SAY", featuring Indian rapper and YouTuber Arpit Bala, as the lead single from his EP HOUSEPHULL, which was released the following month.

In April 2025, Tsumyoki was included in the second edition of Rolling Stone India's "Future of Music" list. In August 2025, he released the single "Don't Even Text", featuring Indian indie singer Gini, which blended his indie rap sound with sleek melodies, and became a hit. He performed the single alongside Gini at the 2025 YouTube Fanfest. Tsumyoki also contributed background vocals for the trailer of the 2025 Hindi film Dhurandhar. He released the single, "MIA" with Nigerian singer Muyeez, in July 2026. The song was included in his EP, Afro Yoki, which released in the following month, featuring Afrobeat and Goan influences.

== Goa Trap Culture ==
Tsumyoki is one of the founding members of the boy band Goa Trap Culture (GTC) or the GTC crew. As of February 2021, the band includes local Goan music artists Elttwo, 2jaym, and Kidd Mange. They are best known for their 2021 studio album Daboij, which features a mix of genres such as pop, rock, indie, R&B/soul, hip-hop, rap, and trap music. The album also features guest artists including Vash and Yelhomie, and production from CapsCtrl on some of the beats.

Some of the popular tracks from the album were "Jackets" and "Flex Bomb" which were particularly favored by the GTC crew. These tracks showcased the influence of diverse music genres such as emo and hip-hop. In an interview with Goan Insider, the crew expressed that the album's title was derived from the camaraderie that united them. The initial work on the album began before the COVID-19 pandemic and took about a year to complete.

The band also mentioned that XXXTentacion, Tyler, the Creator, MF Doom, Anson Seabra, J. Cole, Juice Wrld, Lauv and Nucleya were some of their inspirations for each of their tracks. Nucleya advised them on their vocal approach. One of the singles featured on the album, "Sorpotel", is a reinterpretation with Goan influences. It was originally composed by Tsumyoki's grandfather, Joe, who died without receiving credit for his work. As of 2021, the GTC crew plans to collaborate with Oliver Tree, Ritviz, and Divine in the near future.

== Discography ==
=== Albums ===
Year	Album	Track	Artist(s)	Producer(s)	Notes
2018	RIP	"Rest Easy Bro"	Tsumyoki		
2018	RIP	"Phantom"	Tsumyoki		
2018	RIP	"Memories"	Tsumyoki		
2018	RIP	"Disguise (Interlude)"	Tsumyoki		
2018	RIP	"I Luv Fake Frnds"	Tsumyoki		
2018	RIP	"Stairway to Hell"	Tsumyoki		
2018	RIP	"Brown Eyes"	Tsumyoki ft. Kunal		
2018	RIP	"All Love Everything's Yours"	Tsumyoki		
2018	RIP	"Aley"	Tsumyoki		
2018	RIP	"Dirty"	Tsumyoki		
2018	RIP	"Flex Therapy"	Tsumyoki		
2018	RIP	"No Paint"	Tsumyoki		
2018	RIP	"Distorted Lullabies"	Tsumyoki		
2019	The Art of Flexing	"Introduction The Art of Flexing"	Tsumyoki & ZaDaRapper		
2019	The Art of Flexing	"Tokyo Drift!"	Tsumyoki & ZaDaRapper		
2019	The Art of Flexing	"VIPERZ"	Tsumyoki & ZaDaRapper		
2019	The Art of Flexing	"Super Saiyan!"	Tsumyoki & ZaDaRapper		
2019	The Art of Flexing	"Metallic Fade"	Tsumyoki & ZaDaRapper		
2019	The Art of Flexing	"Goa Trap Culture"	Tsumyoki & ZaDaRapper		
2019	The Art of Flexing	"The Cure"	Tsumyoki & ZaDaRapper		
2020	This Mixtape Is Garbage	"Cake"	Tsumyoki		
2020	This Mixtape Is Garbage	"Candyland"	Tsumyoki	Tsumyoki	
2020	This Mixtape Is Garbage	"Beast Mode"	Tsumyoki & Kidd Mange		
2020	This Mixtape Is Garbage	"All Black Trap Trap"	Tsumyoki & ZaDaRapper		
2020	This Mixtape Is Garbage	"Ballin' We Ballin'"	Tsumyoki & 2jaym		
2020	This Mixtape Is Garbage	"Lef Wris"	Tsumyoki		
2020	This Mixtape Is Garbage	"Gorilla"	Tsumyoki, OV3RDRIVE & Kunal		
2020	This Mixtape Is Garbage	"Girls"	Tsumyoki & Skeletron		
2020	This Mixtape Is Garbage	"Polish"	Tsumyoki		
2020	This Mixtape Is Garbage	"India Type Shiz"	Tsumyoki	Tsumyoki	
2021	Daboij	"Jackets"	Goa Trap Culture, Tsumyoki, Kidd Mange, 2jaym & Elttwo	Tsumyoki	
2021	Daboij	"Actin' Tuff"	Goa Trap Culture, Tsumyoki, Kidd Mange, 2jaym & Elttwo		
2021	Daboij	"Auction"	Goa Trap Culture, Tsumyoki & Kidd Mange		
2021	Daboij	"I've Had Enough"	Goa Trap Culture, Tsumyoki & 2jaym		
2021	Daboij	"Soul Food"	Goa Trap Culture, Tsumyoki, Kidd Mange, Elttwo, 2jaym & Jaden Maskie		
2021	Daboij	"Pardon"	Goa Trap Culture, Tsumyoki, Elttwo, 2jaym & Jaden Maskie		
2021	Daboij	"Yoki's Interlude"	Goa Trap Culture & Tsumyoki		
2021	Daboij	"Flex Bomb"	Goa Trap Culture, Tsumyoki, Kidd Mange, ft. Vash & Yelhomie		
2021	Daboij	"Dumb Shit!"	Goa Trap Culture, Tsumyoki & Kidd Mange		
2021	Daboij	"Bussin'"	Goa Trap Culture, Tsumyoki & Kidd Mange		
2021	Daboij	"Sorpotel" (Bonus Track)	Goa Trap Culture & Tsumyoki		
2023	A Message from the Moon	The Message	Tsumyoki	Tsumyoki	
2023	A Message from the Moon	Falling Down	Tsumyoki	Tsumyoki	
2023	A Message from the Moon	It's Aight	Tsumyoki, Prophet Joegus	Tsumyoki	
2023	A Message from the Moon	Perfect Life	Tsumyoki	Tsumyoki	
2023	A Message from the Moon	Feel Okay	Tsumyoki	Tsumyoki	
2023	A Message from the Moon	Run Away	Tsumyoki, Jaden Maskie	Tsumyoki	
2023	A Message from the Moon	On My Way	Tsumyoki, Elttwo	Tsumyoki	
2023	A Message from the Moon	Fonkey Monkey	Tsumyoki, Kidd Mange	Tsumyoki, Bharg	
2023	A Message from the Moon	Figure Out	Tsumyoki	Tsumyoki, Bharg	
2023	A Message from the Moon	Hard Enough	Tsumyoki	Tsumyoki, Bharg	
2023	A Message from the Moon	Baphomet	Tsumyoki	Tsumyoki, Bharg	
2023	A Message from the Moon	Blazing Over	Tsumyoki, 2jaym	Tsumyoki, Bharg	
2023	A Message from the Moon	Chicken Wings	Tsumyoki	Tsumyoki	
2023	A Message from the Moon (Deluxe)	The Message	Tsumyoki	Tsumyoki	
2023	A Message from the Moon (Deluxe)	pictures that broke my heart	Tsumyoki	Bharg	
2023	A Message from the Moon (Deluxe)	Be Friends	Tsumyoki, Bharg	Tsumyoki, Bharg	
2023	A Message from the Moon (Deluxe)	BREAKSHIT!	Tsumyoki, Calm, Yashraj	Tsumyoki	
2023	A Message from the Moon (Deluxe)	Pink Blue - Remix	Tsumyoki, Connor Price	Tsumyoki, Bharg, Prashant	
2023	A Message from the Moon (Deluxe)	Falling Down	Tsumyoki	Tsumyoki	
2023	A Message from the Moon (Deluxe)	It's Aight	Tsumyoki, Prophet Joegus	Tsumyoki	
2023	A Message from the Moon (Deluxe)	Perfect Life	Tsumyoki	Tsumyoki	
2023	A Message from the Moon (Deluxe)	Feel Okay	Tsumyoki	Tsumyoki	
2023	A Message from the Moon (Deluxe)	Run Away	Tsumyoki, Jaden Maskie	Tsumyoki	
2023	A Message from the Moon (Deluxe)	On My Way	Tsumyoki, Elttwo	Tsumyoki	
2023	A Message from the Moon (Deluxe)	Fonkey Monkey	Tsumyoki, Kidd Mange	Tsumyoki, Bharg	
2023	A Message from the Moon (Deluxe)	Figure Out	Tsumyoki	Tsumyoki, Bharg	
2023	A Message from the Moon (Deluxe)	Hard Enough	Tsumyoki	Tsumyoki, Bharg	
2023	A Message from the Moon (Deluxe)	Baphomet	Tsumyoki	Tsumyoki, Bharg	
2023	A Message from the Moon (Deluxe)	Blazing Over	Tsumyoki, 2jaym	Tsumyoki, Bharg	
2023	A Message from the Moon (Deluxe)	Chicken Wings	Tsumyoki	Tsumyoki	

=== EPs ===
Year	EP	Track	Artist(s)	Producer(s)
2021	Way Too Messy	"Way Too Messy"	Tsumyoki & Kidd Mange	DreddAf, Karan Kanchan & Tsumyoki
2021	Way Too Messy	"All Black Trap Trap 2"	Tsumyoki & Kidd Mange	Tsumyoki
2021	Way Too Messy	"Pao Wala"	Tsumyoki & Kidd Mange	Tsumyoki
2021	Way Too Messy	"No Games"	Tsumyoki & Kidd Mange	Tsumyoki
2021	Way Too Messy	"Commentz"	Tsumyoki & Kidd Mange	Tsumyoki
2024	HOUSEPHULL	"HOUSEPHULL!"	Tsumyoki	Tsumyoki
2024	HOUSEPHULL	"WORK4ME!"	Tsumyoki	Tsumyoki
2024	HOUSEPHULL	"KABADDI!"	Tsumyoki	Tsumyoki
2024	HOUSEPHULL	"MONEY DANCE!"	Tsumyoki, Gravity	Tsumyoki
2024	HOUSEPHULL	"WHAT CAN I SAY?"	Tsumyoki, Arpit Bala	Tsumyoki
2024	HOUSEPHULL	"so scared"	Tsumyoki	Tsumyoki

=== Singles and collaborations ===
Year	Track	Artist(s)	Producer(s)	Note(s)
2018	"Prime Time"	Tsumyoki		
2018	"Ultimate"	Tsumyoki		
2018	"Pu$$y B!tchez!"	Tsumyoki		
2018	"Sick"	Tsumyoki		
2018	"Hugs, Kisses & Heartbreaks"	Tsumyoki		
2018	"Sleep [RIP XXXTENTACION]"	Tsumyoki		
2018	"All White"	Tsumyoki		
2018	"Faces"	Tsumyoki		
2018	"Strong"	Tsumyoki		
2018	"w e ' r e a l l g o i n g d o w n" (Remastered)	Tsumyoki		
2018	"SpongeBob Trappin'"	OV3RDRIVE ft. Tsumyoki		
2018	"Heartbeats"	Tsumyoki		
2019	"Rest in Suicide"	Tsumyoki		
2019	"Who Make Fun of My Wrist?!"	Tsumyoki		
2019	"White Tee"	Tsumyoki		
2019	"White Tee" (Acoustic)	Tsumyoki		
2019	"Go Hard"	Skeletron & Tsumyoki		
2019	"Headphones"	2jaym & Tsumyoki		
2019	"Budapest"	Tsumyoki & Kidd Mange	Tsumyoki	
2020	"Friends"	Tsumyoki		
2020	"Broken Heartz Freestyle"	Tsumyoki		
2020	"The Way I Fall in Love"	Tsumyoki, 2jaym & Jaden Maskie		
2020	"Never Let Go"	Elttwo & Tsumyoki		
2020	"La Vida"	Skeletron & Tsumyoki		
2020	"I've Had Enough"	Tsumyoki & 2jaym ft. Goa Trap Culture		
2020	"KETTA"	Bongisio	Tsumyoki	
2021	"Oh Geez"	Yelhomie & Tsumyoki	Tsumyoki	
2021	"Big Shots!"	Moko Koza, Yelhomie & Tsumyoki	Tsumyoki	
2021	"Sunlight"	Tsumyoki	Tsumyoki	Debut single under Gully Gang Records
2021	"Run Around Town"	Skeletron, Tsumyoki & Elttwo	Skeletron	
2022	"Pink Blue"	Tsumyoki & Bharg	Tsumyoki, Bharg & Prashant	
2022	"Ek Do Ek"	Tsumyoki & Rawal	Tsumyoki	
2022	"idk"	Tsumyoki & Karan Kanchan	Karan Kanchan	
2022	"Feel Okay"	Tsumyoki	Tsumyoki & Bharg	
2023	"Perfect Life"	Tsumyoki	Tsumyoki & Bharg	
2024	"all over again"	Tsumyoki, Falze	Tsumyoki, Falze	
2024	"WHAT CAN I SAY?"	Tsumyoki, Arpit Bala	Tsumyoki	From the EP HOUSEPHULL by Tsumyoki
2024	"lightyears"	Nucleya, Tsumyoki, Da Fyer	Nucleya	From the EP Chamkillah by Nucleya
2025	"WANT IT ALL"	Tsumyoki, MC Square	Adil	
2025	"car keys"	Tsumyoki, Venserto	lil help	
2025	"Don't Even Text"	Tsumyoki, gini	Tsumyoki	
2026	You & I	Tsumyoki	Tsumyoki	From the EP Afro Yoki by Tsumyoki
2026	MIA	Tsumyoki, Muyeez	Tsumyoki	From the EP Afro Yoki by Tsumyoki

== Awards and nominations ==
Year	Award	Category	Song	Result	Ref
2023	MTV Europe Music Awards	Best India Act	It's Aight ft. Prophet Joegus	Won	

== Tours ==
- A Message from the Moon Tour (2023)
- Afro Yoki Tour (2026)
