= Flemming (band) =

Dutch band

Flemming is an Amsterdam-based band, founded in 1997 as Lemming.

== Debut ==
In April 1998 the band (as Lemming) released a self-financed debut The Search EP. It consists of five songs, recorded in a cheap and obscure studio in Amsterdam in two days. Mainstream pop critics were positive about the recordings, and Flemming was offered a spot on the main stage of the London Calling festival in Paradiso, Amsterdam in October 1998. Flemming then played at the annual Noorderslag Festival in Groningen. Warner Music offered Flemming a recording contract and preparations for the recording of the first full-length album, to be produced by label mate Tom Pintens of Flemish band Zita Swoon, were made.

== Name change ==
Because of legal problems concerning a reunion tour of 1970s horror rock act Lemming the band name was officially changed to "Flemming". In July 2000, Flemming's official self-titled debut was released. Dutch established pop watchers and critics were positive about the album. Pop magazine LiveXS chose the album as album of the month. The first single released from the album was the song "Name?". The promotional video in which the band performed the song next to the set of an adult movie was banned from the Dutch music channel TMF during day time. A censored version did reach day time television.

While promoting their debut album in Dutch live circuit Flemming also made numerous appearances on Dutch TV and radio during 2000/2001. Programs like 2-metersessies, TMF Café and De Plantage featured TV performances of the band. On the radio Flemming performed on Leidsekade live, BNN Live and Isabelle. In 2001, Flemming played at the Noorderslag Festival once more, and in May 2001 "Starry Night" became the second single from the debut album. The song was orchestrated by Robert Kirby, well known for his work with English singer-songwriter Nick Drake (1948–1974).

== Second album ==
In 2002 Flemming recorded the second album We love the Industry. It was however not released until February 2004, because Warner Music dropped all artists signed to the Dutch branch of the company. We love the Industry was released by independent label Idol Media. The first single drawn from it was titled "Old Boys". The arrangement was by Robert Kirby, and also featured Dutch female singer Birgit Schuurman.

== Discography ==
=== Albums ===
- The Search (EP) (1998)
- Flemming (2000)
- We love the Industry (2004)

=== Singles ===
- "Name?"
- "Starry Night"
- "Old Boys"

== Lineup ==
- Vocals/Guitar: Rutger van Mourik
- Guitar: Jigal 'Jiggle' Krant
- Bass: Pepijn 'Pup' Grimmelikhuizen
- Piano/Synths: Eddy Steeneken
- Drums: Mark Edelman
