= Liad Meir =

Liad Meir ליעד מאיר
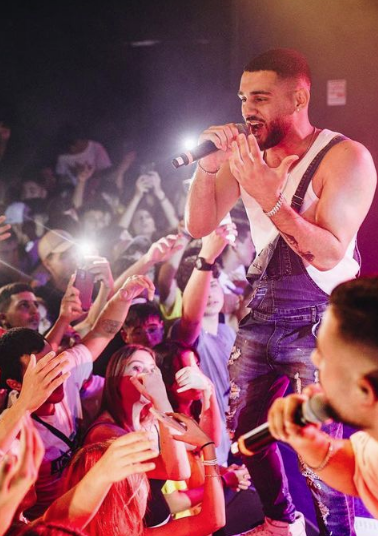

Background information
- Born: 23 January 2002 (age 24)
- Genre: Hip hop
- Occupations: Rapper; singer; songwriter; record producer
- Years active: 2021–present

Liad Meir (born January 23, 2002) is an Israeli rapper.

== Biography ==
Meir grew up in Karmiel. He began his music career in 2018, at the age of 16, with the release of his first song, "In the End, Everything Passes Away." That same year, he rose to fame after appearing on the hit reality show "Beats".

On December 16, 2021, he released the first single from his debut album, "Jump Your Leg." Two weeks later, on January 1, 2022, he released another single, "Flo'o Shel Tembel." Both songs were successful on social media.

In 2023, the album "Floo Shel Tembel" was released. The album features collaborations with Sagi Dahan, Ziv Shavit, Michael Suissa, Ron Hayon, Duda, and Big Sazo. The album was a success on streaming platforms, reaching number nine on Spotify weekly album chart. On July 9, he released the single "Shotim" featuring rapper Duda. On August 6, he released the single "Til Petzmar." On September 1, he released the single "Tekoa Bin Dvarim 2" with. In 2023 he was nominated for the MTV Europe Music Award for Best Israeli Act, which was not awarded due to the Gaza war.

He released the single "Shotim" with rapper Duda. On August 6, he released the single "Til Petzmar." On September 1, he released the single "Tekoa Bin Dvarim 2" with Chen Porati. On May 26, 2024, he featured on Ron Hayon's single "Hila."

On July 1, he collaborated on Dudu Farouk's song "Goose Liver." On August 4, he released the song "Butterflies in the Stomach," featuring Moran Mazor. On September 1, he collaborated on Ziv Shavit's album "Okay" with the song "Top Emcee." On September 7, he collaborated with Izzy on Odia album "Girl of Faith" with the song "The Good and the Bad." On January 12, 2025, he collaborated on Duda's album "Transparent," on the song "Under a Stretcher." On March 9, he released the song "Versim," and on May 11, "Bad Beach." On June 8, he released the album "Flowers and Blows," which includes a collaboration with Ron Hayon and was produced by Duda and Yishai Suissa.
