= Joke Singh =

Indian comedian and actor

Nishant Tanwar
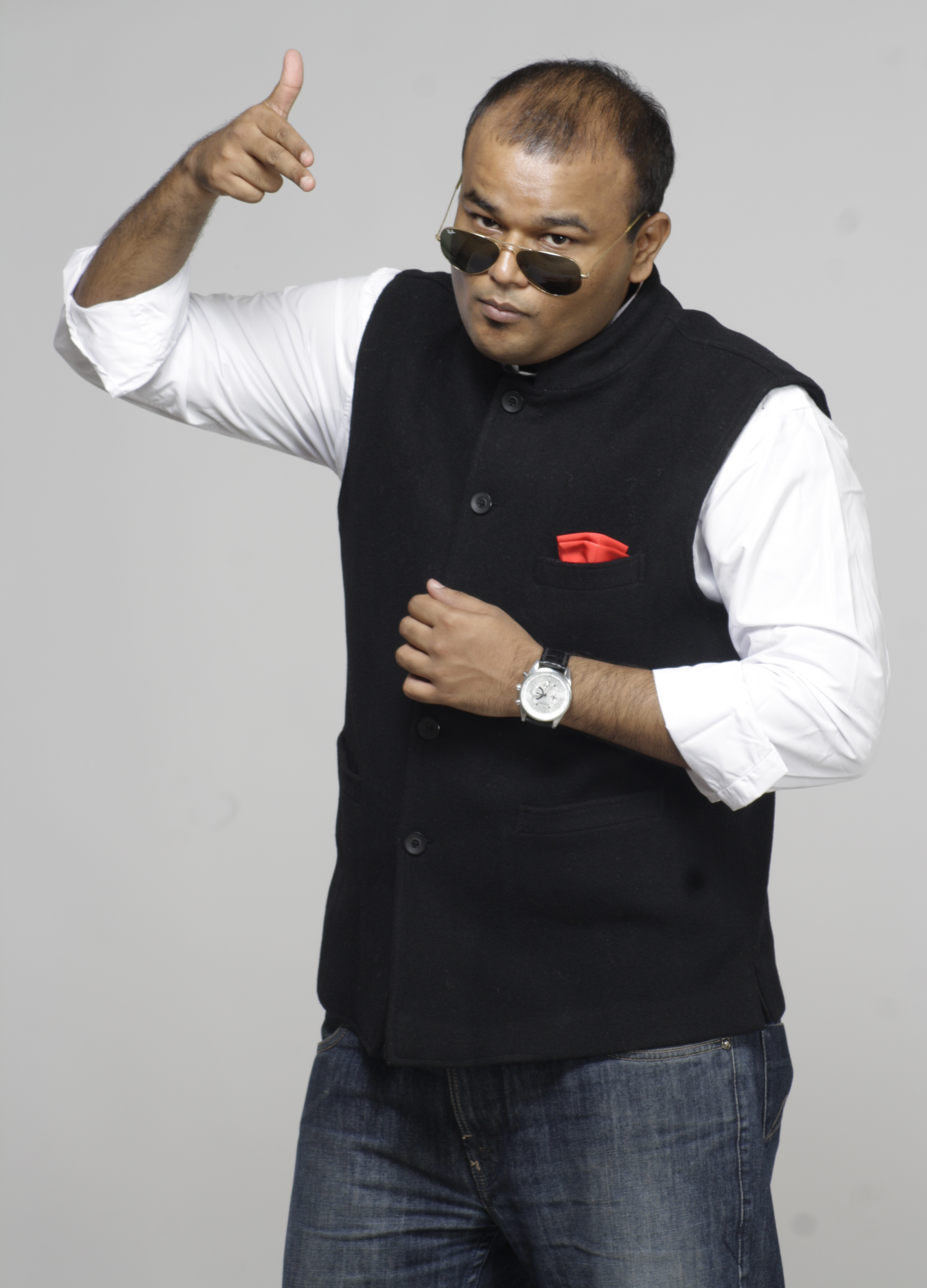
- Born: Nishant Tanwar; Jamnagar, Gujarat, India

Comedy career
- Years active: 2009–present
- Medium: Stand-up, television, radio, books
- Genres: Comedian, actor, comedy musician
- Subjects: Stereotypes, multiculturalism, Indian culture
- Website: nishanttanwar.com

Nishant Tanwar (born on 7 November 1982), also known as 'Joke Singh' and more recently as 'Rider OP', is an Indian comedian and actor. He started off his professional career working at NDTV as a producer, and began doing stand-up in 2009 when he found his passion for the same at an open mic event.

Apart from corporate shows, Nishant has performed and conceptualized comedy specials like Comedy in Diversity, Two and a Laugh Men, and Third World Comedy and is the founding member of IPL (Improv Premier League), Delhi's foremost improv comedy troupe.

== Career ==
Nishant first worked at NDTV as an editor. When stand-up comedy was just hitting the peak, he quit his career in the media industry and became a full-time comedian. He is one of the prominent face amidst Delhi and Gurgaon stand-up comedy circles. Taking digs at stereotypes and Indian culture, Nishant Tanwar's humor is universal—connecting with all segments of people breaking social and age group barriers. He recently gained more popularity on social media and completed his half million subscribers on YouTube due to his standup special with Amazon Prime's Delhi Se Hoon B******d.

== Notable performances ==
Nishant's performance in Gurgaon, on the Raaghavi Day conducted by The Times of India was completely sold out. Tanwar also hosted the "Joke Joker Jokest" event at Kolkata organized by The Times of India, with noted comedians Sourav Ghosh, Vaibhav Sethia, Anirban Dasgupta, and Abhijit Ganguly.

Nishant Tanwar had also been a part of Comedy Central's improv shows on television. He has performed to packed auditoriums nationally in Mumbai, Delhi, Bangalore, Gurgaon, and Kolkata as well as international audiences in Philippines, Thailand, Singapore, Malaysia, and Indonesia. He also performed with Zakir Khan at Gurgaon.

Nishant Tanwar Live- The New Special was presented by Comedy Circuit in Kolkata in 2019, which was also recorded for Amazon Prime Video. He constantly started streaming under the pseudonym 'Rider OP' during the COVID-19 pandemic, and has been noted for some appreciable reaction videos, both single and joint with comedian Tanmay Bhat, as part of the series Tanmay Reacts.

== Filmography ==
Year	Name	Platform	Notes
2018	Delhi Se Hoon Bhenchod	Amazon Prime Video	Known as 'bhai' by his fans, Nishant shares his life experiences, the background he comes from, his dad, his friends, his girlfriend, and his girlfriend's boyfriend.
2019	Gaadi Tera Bhai Chalayega	Amazon Prime Video	This time he talks about his dreams, aspirations, hopes, and struggles. Nishant takes us through his journey from being an underdog to becoming one of India's most beloved stand-up comedians.
2026	India's Got Latent	Netflix	Guest judge on panel
