= Aime Simone =

French singer and songwriter

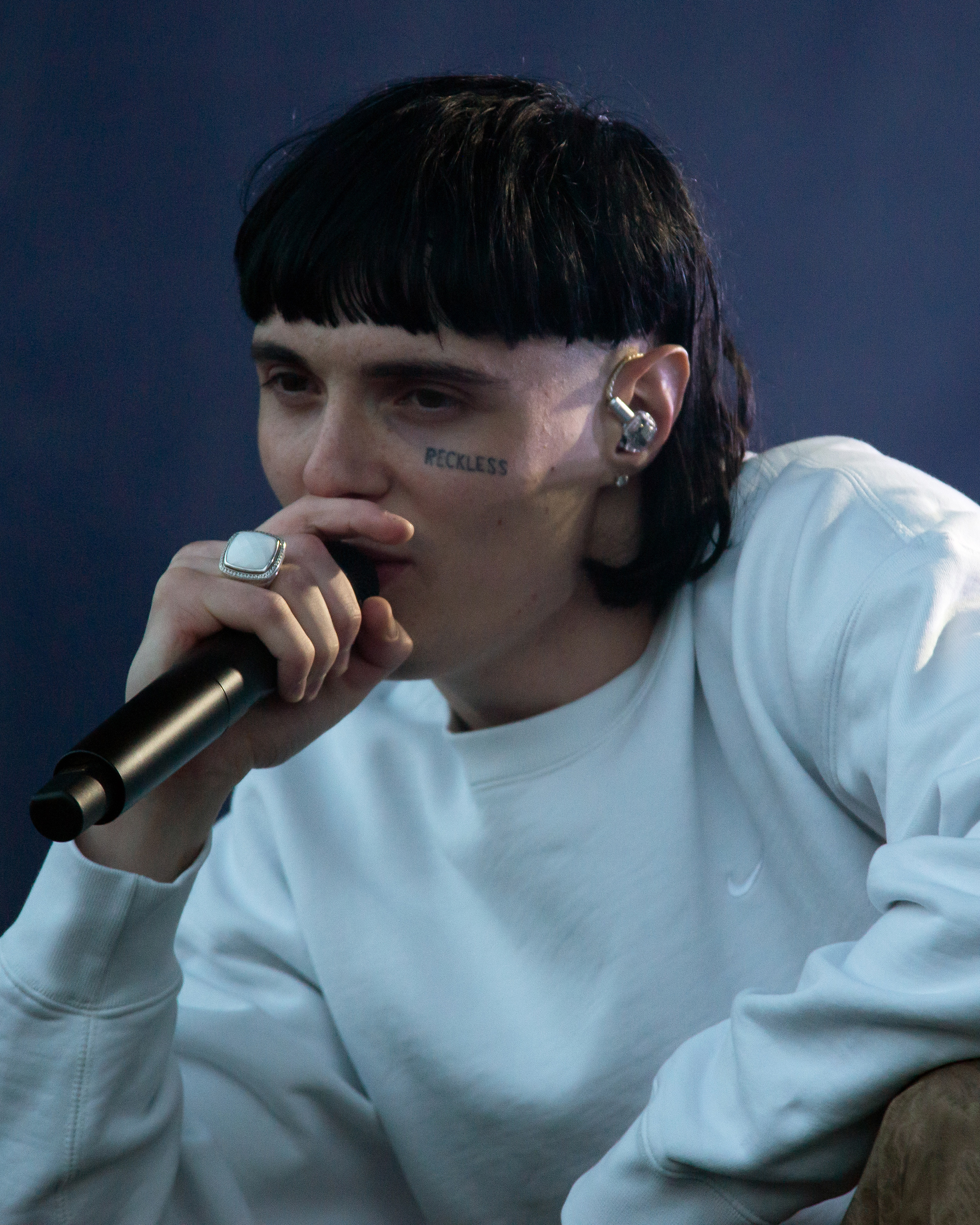
- Aime Simone at the "Festival Papillons de nuit", June 2022

Background information
- Born: Aime Simone; 31 December 1993 (age 32); Paris, France
- Genres: Pop
- Occupations: Singer, songwriter, producer
- Instrument: Voice
- Years active: 2020–present
- Label: Because Music
- Website: www.aimesimone.com

Aime Simone (born 31 December 1993) is a French singer-songwriter and producer. He was born in Paris to a French family with Norwegian origins. He rose to prominence in 2020 after his song “In This Dark Time” went viral in Ukraine. Later that year he released his first album, “Say Yes, Say No”, a DIY mixtape/album that was finished in 3 months. In 2021 his song “Shining Light” became a major hit in France, receiving platinum certification. In 2023 he released the album “Oh Glory” and was nominated as Male Revelation at Les Victoires.

== Biography ==
His maternal grandmother is originally from Norway. His paternal side originates in the Massive Central area of France, where he spent much of his summers as a child with his paternal grandparents, Aime and Simone, whom he is named after. He grew up in the 11th district of Paris where he had a complicated experience with school, where he often got into trouble which led to bigger issues such as panic attacks caused by trauma and later problems with the police. At the age of 11, he started learning guitar, and at 17 started writing his own songs, in English, for the reason that his heroes were all anglophone, and that the language allowed him freedom and intimacy that his native French did not. In his teenage years he developed a serious eating disorder which would plague him for the next decade, leading to many clinical stays and a suicide attempt that had him pronounced dead for several minutes.

In 2012, he caught the attention of Pete Doherty at one of Pete's shows at the Bus Palladium in Paris when he threw a notebook of poems on stage which started a friendship between them. He spent much of the next year living with Doherty.

In 2013 he was discovered by Hedi Slimane who chose him as an exclusive model for Saint Laurent. He modelled in Paris and later in New York and Los Angeles for the brand. After living almost two years in Vienna, he met Sonja Fix in 2017, an American artist who became his main collaborator. That same year they moved to Berlin, which incited a new phase of personal and artistic experimentation. Later the next year their daughter was born. He released “In This Dark Time”, the second single released under the name Aime Simone, in early 2020. That summer it went viral in Ukraine and entered the charts after being played at parties and remixed by DJs. He released his first album “Say Yes, Say No” on 31 July 2020, which was written, produced and recorded by Aime Simone and Sonja Fix in 3 months. After the release of the album Aime moved back to France to be closer to his family. There, he and Sonja continued to write music, and started to enter into the French music industry.

In 2022 his song “Shining Light” became a major hit on French radios, reaching platinum certification and attaining the prize "Coup de Coeur of La Chanson de l’annee 2023". His second album “Oh Glory” was released on 5 May 2023. He was nominated as Male Revelation (Révélation Masculine) at Les Victoires. He performed his single “Answer The Night” at the 39th ceremony of Les Victoires.

== Discography ==
=== Albums ===
- 2020, Say Yes, Say No
- 2023, Oh Glory

=== Singles ===
- 2020, In This Dark Time
- 2020, Shining Light (Platinum Certification)
- 2021, Answer The Night
