= List of YouTube features =

YouTube logo used since June 2024

YouTube is an online video sharing platform owned by Google, founded on February 14, 2005, by Steve Chen, Chad Hurley, and Jawed Karim, and headquartered in San Bruno, California, United States. It is the second-most visited website in the world, after Google Search.

It offers different features based on user verification, such as standard or basic features like uploading videos, creating playlists, and using YouTube Music, with limits based on daily activity (verification via phone number or channel history increases feature availability and daily usage limits); intermediate or additional features like longer videos (over 15 minutes), live streaming, custom thumbnails, and creating podcasts; advanced features like content ID appeals, embedding live streams, applying for monetization, clickable links, adding chapters, and pinning comments on videos or posts.

As of October 2024, it includes multitask with the improved miniplayer, build, share, and vote on favorite YouTube playlists, set bedtime with Sleep Timer, and an upgrade on YouTube TV.

== Video technology ==
YouTube primarily uses the VP9 and H.264/MPEG-4 AVC video codecs, and the Dynamic Adaptive Streaming over HTTP protocol. By January 2019, YouTube had begun rolling out videos in AV1 format, since then videos which are popular have it. In 2021 it was reported that the company was considering requiring AV1 in streaming hardware in order to decrease bandwidth and increase quality. For stereo, video is usually streamed alongside the Opus or AAC audio codecs. For 5.1 sound, Dolby Digital, Dolby Digital Plus, rarely DTS Express or AAC is used. Additionally, some videos may include Eclipsa audio, which combines Opus with IAMF (Immersive Audio Model and Format). Certain music has HE-AAC, which is exclusively available on YouTube Music. Additionally, some videos may have separate audio streams with Dynamic Range Compression and/or Voice Boost.

At launch in 2005, viewing YouTube videos on a personal computer required the Adobe Flash Player plug-in to be installed in the browser. MPEG-4 Part 2 streams contained within 3GP containers were also provided for low bandwidth connections. In January 2010, YouTube launched an experimental version of the site that used the built-in multimedia capabilities of Web browsers supporting HTML video. This allowed videos to be viewed without requiring Adobe Flash Player or any other plug-in to be installed. On January 27, 2015, YouTube announced that HTML video would be the default playback method on supported browsers. HTML video streams use Dynamic Adaptive Streaming over HTTP (MPEG-DASH), an HTTP-based adaptive bit-rate streaming solution optimizes the bitrate and quality for the available network.

The platform can serve videos at optionally lower resolution levels starting at 144p for smoother playback in areas and countries with limited Internet speeds, improving compatibility, as well as for the preservation of limited cellular data plans. The resolution can be adjusted automatically based on detected connection speed or set manually.

From 2008 to 2017, users could add "annotations" to their videos, such as pop-up text messages and hyperlinks, which allowed for interactive videos. By 2019, all annotations had been removed from videos, breaking some videos that depended on the feature. YouTube introduced standardized widgets intended to replace annotations in a cross-platform manner, including "end screens" (a customizable array of thumbnails for specified videos displayed near the end of the video).

In 2018, YouTube became an International Standard Name Identifier (ISNI) registry, and announced its intention to begin creating ISNI identifiers to uniquely identify the musicians whose videos it features.

Users can verify their account, normally through a mobile phone, to gain the ability to upload videos up to 12 hours in length, as well as produce live streams. Users who have built sufficient channel history and have a good track record of complying with the site's Community Guidelines will also gain access to these aforementioned features as well. When YouTube was launched in 2005, it was possible to upload longer videos, but a 10-minute limit was introduced in March 2006 after YouTube found that the majority of videos exceeding this length were unauthorized uploads of television shows and films. The 10-minute limit was increased to 15 minutes in July 2010. Videos can be at most 256 GB in size or 12 hours, whichever is less. As of 2021, automatic closed captions using speech recognition technology when a video is uploaded are available in 13 languages, and can be machine-translated during playback.

YouTube also offers manual closed captioning as part of its creator studio. YouTube formerly offered a 'Community Captions' feature, where viewers could write and submit captions for public display upon approval by the video uploader, but this was deprecated in September 2020.

YouTube accepts the most common container formats, including MP4, Matroska, FLV, AVI, WebM, 3GP, MPEG-PS, and the QuickTime File Format. Some intermediate video formats (i.e., primarily used for professional video editing, not for final delivery or storage) are also accepted, such as ProRes. YouTube provides recommended encoding settings.

Each video is identified by an eleven-character case-sensitive alphanumerical Base64 string in the Uniform Resource Locator (URL) which can contain letters, digits, an underscore (_), and a dash (-).

In 2018, YouTube added a feature called Premiere which displays a notification to the user mentioning when the video will be available for the first time, like for a live stream but with a prerecorded video. When the scheduled time arrives, the video is aired as a live broadcast with a two-minute countdown. Optionally, a premiere can be initiated immediately.

=== Quality and formats ===
YouTube originally offered videos at only one quality level, displayed at a resolution of 320×240 pixels using the Sorenson Spark codec (a variant of H.263), with mono MP3 audio. In June 2007, YouTube added an option to watch videos in 3GP format on mobile phones. In March 2008, a high-quality mode was added, which increased the resolution to 480×360 pixels. In November 2008, 720p HD support was added. At the time of the 720p launch, the YouTube player was changed from a 4:3 aspect ratio to a widescreen 16:9. With this new feature, YouTube began a switchover to H.264/MPEG-4 AVC as its default video compression format. In November 2009, 1080p HD support was added. In July 2010, YouTube announced that it had launched a range of videos in 4K format, which allows a resolution of up to 4096×3072 pixels. In July 2010, support for 2160p UHD was added, with the videos playing at 3840 × 2160 pixels. In June 2014, YouTube began to deploy support for high frame rate videos up to 60 frames per second (as opposed to 30 before), becoming available for user uploads in October. YouTube stated that this would enhance "motion-intensive" videos, such as video game footage. In June 2015, support for 8K resolution was added, with the videos playing at 7680×4320 pixels. In November 2016, support for HDR video was added which can be encoded with hybrid log–gamma (HLG) or perceptual quantizer (PQ). HDR video can be encoded with the Rec. 2020 color space.

YouTube videos are available in a range of quality levels. Viewers only indirectly influence the video quality. In the mobile apps, users choose between "Auto", which adjusts resolution based on the internet connection, "High Picture Quality" which will prioritize playing high-quality video, "Data saver" which will sacrifice video quality in favor of low data usage and "Advanced" which lets the user choose a stream resolution. On desktop, users choose between "Auto" and a specific resolution. It is not possible for the viewer to directly choose a higher bitrate (quality) for any selected resolution.

Since 2009, viewers have had the ability to watch 3D videos. In 2015, YouTube began natively supporting 360-degree video. Since April 2016, it allowed live streaming 360° video, and both normal and 360° video at up to 1440p, and since November 2016 both at up to 4K (2160p) resolution. Citing the limited number of users who watched more than 90-degrees, it began supporting an alternative stereoscopic video format known as VR180 which it said was easier to produce, which allows users to watch any video using virtual reality headsets.

In response to increased viewership during the COVID-19 pandemic, YouTube temporarily downgraded the quality of its videos. YouTube developed its own chip, called "Argos", to help with encoding higher resolution videos in 2021.

In April 2023, YouTube began offering some videos in an enhanced bitrate "1080p Premium" option for YouTube Premium subscribers on iOS. In August 2023, the feature became available to subscribers on desktop platforms.

In certain cases, YouTube allows the uploader to upgrade the quality of videos uploaded a long time ago in poor quality. One such partnership with Universal Music Group included remasters of 1,000 music videos.

As of 29 October 2025, a feature known as "Super Resolution" began rolling out, using artificial intelligence to upscale older videos to a resolution of up to 1080p.

=== Live streaming ===
YouTube carried out early experiments with live streaming, including its YouTube Live event in 2008, a concert by U2 in 2009, and a question-and-answer session with US President Barack Obama in February 2010. These tests had relied on technology from 3rd-party partners, but in September 2010, YouTube began testing its own live streaming infrastructure. In April 2011, YouTube announced the rollout of YouTube Live. The creation of live streams was initially limited to select partners. It was used for real-time broadcasting of events such as the 2012 Olympics in London. In October 2012, more than 8 million people watched Felix Baumgartner's jump from the edge of space as a live stream on YouTube.

In May 2013, creation of live streams was opened to verified users with at least 1,000 subscribers; in August of the same year the number was reduced to 100 subscribers, and in December the limit was removed. In February 2017, live streaming was introduced to the official YouTube mobile app. Live streaming via mobile was initially restricted to users with at least 10,000 subscribers; as of mid-2017, it has been reduced to 100 subscribers. Live streams support HDR, 360º video, and can be up to 4K resolution at 60 fps.

== User features ==
=== Comment system ===
Most videos enable users to leave comments, which have attracted attention for the negative aspects of their form and content. In 2006, Time praised Web 2.0 for enabling "community and collaboration on a scale never seen before", and added that YouTube "harnesses the stupidity of crowds as well as its wisdom. Some of the comments on YouTube make you weep for the future of humanity just for the spelling alone, never mind the obscenity and the naked hatred". The Guardian in 2009 described users' comments on YouTube as:

Juvenile, aggressive, misspelt, sexist, homophobic, swinging from raging at the contents of a video to providing a pointlessly detailed description followed by a LOL, YouTube comments are a hotbed of infantile debate and unashamed ignorance—with the occasional burst of wit shining through.

The Daily Telegraph commented in September 2008, that YouTube was "notorious" for "some of the most confrontational and ill-formed comment exchanges on the internet", and reported on YouTube Comment Snob, "a new piece of software that blocks rude and illiterate posts". The Huffington Post noted in April 2012 that finding comments on YouTube that appear "offensive, stupid and crass" to the "vast majority" of the people is hardly difficult.

Google subsequently implemented a comment system oriented on Google+ on November 6, 2013, that required all YouTube users to use a Google+ account to comment on videos. The stated motivation for the change was giving creators more power to moderate and block comments, thereby addressing frequent criticisms of their quality and tone. The new system restored the ability to include URLs in comments, which had previously been removed due to problems with abuse. In response, YouTube co-founder Jawed Karim posted the question "why the fuck do I need a google+ account to comment on a video?" on his YouTube channel to express his negative opinion of the change. The official YouTube announcement received 20,097 "thumbs down" votes and generated more than 32,000 comments in two days. Writing in the Newsday blog Silicon Island, Chase Melvin noted that "Google+ is nowhere near as popular a social media network like Facebook, but it's essentially being forced upon millions of YouTube users who don't want to lose their ability to comment on videos" and added that "Discussion forums across the Internet are already bursting with the outcry against the new comment system". In the same article Melvin goes on to say:

Perhaps user complaints are justified, but the idea of revamping the old system isn't so bad. Think of the crude, misogynistic and racially-charged mudslinging that has transpired over the last eight years on YouTube without any discernible moderation. Isn't any attempt to curb unidentified libelers worth a shot? The system is far from perfect, but Google should be lauded for trying to alleviate some of the damage caused by irate YouTubers hiding behind animosity and anonymity.

Later, on July 27, 2015, Google announced in a blog post that it would be removing the requirement to sign up to a Google+ account to post comments to YouTube. On November 3, 2016, YouTube announced a trial scheme which allows the creators of videos to decide whether to approve, hide or report the comments posted on videos based on an algorithm that detects potentially offensive comments. Creators may also choose to keep or delete comments with links or hashtags to combat spam. They can also allow other users to moderate their comments.

In December 2020, it was reported that YouTube would launch a new feature that will warn users who post a comment that "may be offensive to others."

=== Community ===
On September 13, 2016, YouTube launched a public beta of Community, a social media-based feature that allows users to post text, images (including GIFs), live videos and others in a separate "Community" tab on their channel. Prior to the release, several creators had been consulted to suggest tools Posts could incorporate that they would find useful; these YouTubers included Vlogbrothers, AsapScience, Lilly Singh, The Game Theorists, Karmin, The Key of Awesome, The Kloons, Peter Hollens, Rosianna Halse Rojas, Sam Tsui, Threadbanger and Vsauce3.

After the feature has been officially released, the community post feature gets activated automatically for every channel that passes a specific threshold of subscriber counts or already has more subscribers. This threshold was lowered over time, from 10,000 subscribers to 1500, then 1000, then 500. In 2023, it was made accessible to all users with Advanced features enabled regardless of their subscriber count.

Channels that the community tab becomes enabled for, get their channel discussions (previously known as channel comments) permanently erased, instead of co-existing or migrating.

In January 2025, the feature was renamed Posts.

=== TestTube ===
Experimental features of YouTube could be accessed in an area of the site formerly named TestTube. For example, in October 2009, a comment search feature accessible under /comment_search was implemented as part of this program, however the feature was later removed. Later the same year, YouTube Feather was introduced as a "lightweight" alternative website for countries with limited internet speeds. Following the transition to the Polymer layout, TestTube was disabled, and the URL redirects to video playback settings. TestTube was replaced by a new system that requires users to be subscribed to YouTube Premium in order to enable or disable experiments.

== Content accessibility ==
YouTube offers users the ability to view its videos on web pages outside their website. Each YouTube video is accompanied by a piece of HTML that can be used to embed it on any page on the Web. This functionality is often used to embed YouTube videos in social networking pages and blogs. Users wishing to post a video discussing, inspired by, or related to another user's video can make a "video response". The eleven character YouTube video identifier (64 possible characters used in each position), allows for a theoretical maximum of 64^{11} or around 73.8 quintillion (73.8 billion billion) unique ids.

YouTube announced that it would remove video responses for being an underused feature on August 27, 2013. Embedding, rating, commenting and response posting can be disabled by the video owner. YouTube does not usually offer a download link for its videos, and intends for them to be viewed through its website interface. A small number of videos can be downloaded as MP4 files. Numerous third-party web sites, applications and browser plug-ins allow users to download YouTube videos.

In February 2009, YouTube announced a test service, allowing some partners to offer video downloads for free or for a fee paid through Google Checkout. In June 2012, Google sent cease and desist letters threatening legal action against several websites offering online download and conversion of YouTube videos. In response, Zamzar removed the ability to download YouTube videos from its site. Users retain copyright of their own work under the default Standard YouTube License, but have the option to grant certain usage rights under any public copyright license they choose.

Since July 2012, it has been possible to select a Creative Commons attribution license as the default, allowing other users to reuse and remix the material.

=== Platforms ===
Most modern smartphones are capable of accessing YouTube videos, either within an application or through an optimized website. YouTube Mobile was launched in June 2007, using RTSP streaming for the video. Not all of YouTube's videos are available on the mobile version of the site.

Since June 2007, YouTube's videos have been available for viewing on a range of Apple products. This required YouTube's content to be transcoded into Apple's preferred video standard, H.264, a process that took several months. YouTube videos can be viewed on devices including Apple TV, iPod Touch and the iPhone.

The mobile version of the site was relaunched based on HTML video in July 2010, avoiding the need to use Adobe Flash Player and optimized for use with touch screen controls. The mobile version is also available as an app for the Android platform.

In September 2012, YouTube launched its first app for the iPhone, following the decision to drop YouTube as one of the preloaded apps in the iPhone 5 and iOS 6 operating system. According to GlobalWebIndex, YouTube was used by 35% of smartphone users between April and June 2013, making it the third-most used app.

A TiVo service update in July 2008 allowed the system to search and play YouTube videos.

In January 2009, YouTube launched "YouTube for TV", a version of the website tailored for set-top boxes and other TV-based media devices with web browsers, initially allowing its videos to be viewed on the PlayStation 3 and Wii video game consoles.

During the month of June that same year, YouTube XL was introduced, which has a simplified interface designed for viewing on a standard television screen. YouTube is also available as an app on Xbox Live.

On November 15, 2012, Google launched an official app for the Wii, allowing users to watch YouTube videos from the Wii channel. An app was available for Wii U and Nintendo 3DS, but the latter was discontinued in August 2019. Videos can also be viewed on the Wii U Internet Browser using HTML video. Google made YouTube available on the Roku player on December 17, 2013, and, in October 2014, the Sony PlayStation 4.

YouTube launched as a downloadable app for the Nintendo Switch in November 2018. While the Nintendo Switch app is not backwards compatible with it, a native version for the Nintendo Switch 2 is planned for release in the future.

== International and localization ==
In early years of operation, Google faced some criticism for 'encouraging the dominance of US values', by prioritising English over other languages. On June 19, 2007, at a conference in Paris, Google CEO Eric Schmidt launched YouTube localization, with stated aims including customizing the YouTube experience by country, including country-specific comments, metrics, and video rankings. From 2007, YouTube's localization was rolled out.

A 2015 report on YouTube's localization showed it to be continuing, and expanding. In February 2023, YouTube made it possible to upload a single video in multiple languages. Prior to 2023, the only option for YouTubers to broaden their content's reach to audiences speaking different languages was to launch an entirely separate secondary channel for each language and upload dubbed versions of their videos across all those channels. MrBeast called multi-language dub tracks a “giant win” for creators. With the introduction of the dubbing localization option, many creators switched from uploading to separate channels to uploading to their main channel with dubbed versions.

In September 2024, YouTube announced the expansion of auto dubbing feature, which generates translated audio tracks in other languages to make the creator's videos more accessible to international viewers, to more markets and languages. The feature was originally announced in 2022 as Aloud. However, the feature has initially been criticized for providing robotic-sounding dubs, mistranslations, and lack of an option for the user to disable auto-dubbed voices.

=== YouTube localization by country ===
As of 2026, the interface of YouTube is available with localized versions in 110 countries, two territories (Hong Kong & Puerto Rico) and a worldwide version and continues to extend the availability of its localized version to additional countries and regions.

If YouTube is unable to identify a specific country or region according to the IP address, the default location is the United States. However, YouTube offers language and content preferences for all accessible countries, regions, and languages.

Countries with YouTube localization
Country	Language(s)	Launch date	Ref.
United States	English	February 14, 2005	
Brazil	Portuguese	June 19, 2007	
France	French, Catalan, Basque	June 19, 2007	
Ireland	English, Irish	June 19, 2007	
Italy	Italian, German, Catalan	June 19, 2007	
Japan	Japanese	June 19, 2007	
Netherlands	Dutch	June 19, 2007	
Poland	Polish	June 19, 2007	
Spain	Spanish, Galician, Catalan, Basque	June 19, 2007	
United Kingdom	English	June 19, 2007	
Mexico	Spanish	October 11, 2007	
Hong Kong	Chinese, English	October 17, 2007	
Taiwan	Chinese	October 18, 2007	
Australia	English	October 22, 2007	
New Zealand	English	October 22, 2007	
Canada	English, French	November 6, 2007	
Germany	German	November 8, 2007	
Russia	Russian	November 13, 2007	
South Korea	Korean	January 23, 2008	
India	Hindi, Bengali, Punjabi, English, Gujarati, Kannada, Malayalam, Marathi, Tamil, Assamese, Odia, Telugu, Urdu	May 7, 2008	
Israel	Hebrew, Arabic	September 16, 2008	
Czech Republic	Czech	October 9, 2008	
Sweden	Swedish	October 22, 2008	
South Africa	English, Afrikaans, Zulu	May 17, 2010	
Argentina	Spanish	September 8, 2010	
Algeria	Arabic, French	March 9, 2011	
Egypt	Arabic	March 9, 2011	
Jordan	Arabic	March 9, 2011	
Morocco	French, Arabic	March 9, 2011	
Saudi Arabia	Arabic	March 9, 2011	
Tunisia	Arabic, French	March 9, 2011	
Yemen	Arabic	March 9, 2011	
Kenya	English, Swahili	September 1, 2011	
Philippines	Filipino, English	October 13, 2011	
Singapore	English, Malay, Chinese, Tamil	October 20, 2011	
Belgium	French, Dutch, German	November 16, 2011	
Colombia	Spanish	November 30, 2011	
Uganda	English, Swahili	December 2, 2011	
Nigeria	English	December 7, 2011	
Chile	Spanish	January 20, 2012	
Hungary	Hungarian	February 29, 2012	
Malaysia	Malay, English	March 22, 2012	
Peru	Spanish	March 25, 2012	
United Arab Emirates	Arabic, English	April 1, 2012	
Greece	Greek	May 1, 2012	
Ghana	English	June 5, 2012	
Indonesia	Indonesian, English	June 14, 2012	
Senegal	French, English	July 4, 2012	
Turkey	Turkish	October 1, 2012	
Ukraine	Ukrainian	December 13, 2012	
Denmark	Danish	February 1, 2013	
Finland	Finnish, Swedish	February 1, 2013	
Norway	Norwegian	February 1, 2013	
Switzerland	German, French, Italian	March 29, 2013	
Austria	German	March 29, 2013	
Romania	Romanian	April 25, 2013	
Portugal	Portuguese	May 7, 2013	
Slovakia	Slovak	May 21, 2013	
Bahrain	Arabic	August 16, 2013	
Kuwait	Arabic	August 16, 2013	
Oman	Arabic	August 16, 2013	
Qatar	Arabic	August 16, 2013	
Bosnia and Herzegovina	Bosnian, Croatian, Serbian	March 17, 2014	
Bulgaria	Bulgarian	March 17, 2014	
Croatia	Croatian	March 17, 2014	
Estonia	Estonian	March 17, 2014	
Latvia	Latvian	March 17, 2014	
Lithuania	Lithuanian	March 17, 2014	
North Macedonia	Macedonian, Serbian, Turkish	March 17, 2014	
Montenegro	Serbian, Croatian	March 17, 2014	
Serbia	Serbian	March 17, 2014	
Slovenia	Slovenian	March 17, 2014	
Lebanon	Arabic	May 1, 2014	
Thailand	Thai	May 19, 2014	
Puerto Rico	Spanish, English	August 23, 2014	
Iceland	Icelandic	September 2014	
Luxembourg	French, German	September 2014	
Vietnam	Vietnamese	October 1, 2014	
Libya	Arabic	February 1, 2015	
Tanzania	English, Swahili	June 2, 2015	
Zimbabwe	English	June 2, 2015	
Azerbaijan	Azerbaijani and Russian	October 12, 2015	
Belarus	Belarusian and Russian	October 12, 2015	
Georgia	Georgian	October 12, 2015	
Kazakhstan	Kazakh and Russian	October 12, 2015	
Iraq	Arabic	November 9, 2015	
Nepal	Nepali	January 12, 2016	
Pakistan	Urdu, English	January 12, 2016	
Sri Lanka	Sinhala, Tamil, English	January 12, 2016	
Jamaica	English	August 4, 2016	
Malta	English	June 19, 2018	
Bolivia	Spanish	January 30, 2019	
Costa Rica	Spanish	January 30, 2019	
Ecuador	Spanish	January 30, 2019	
El Salvador	Spanish	January 30, 2019	
Guatemala	Spanish	January 30, 2019	
Honduras	Spanish	January 30, 2019	
Nicaragua	Spanish	January 30, 2019	
Panama	Spanish	January 30, 2019	
Uruguay	Spanish	January 30, 2019	
Paraguay	Spanish, Guarani	February 21, 2019	
Dominican Republic	Spanish	February 21, 2019	
Cyprus	Greek, Turkish	March 13, 2019	
Liechtenstein	German	March 13, 2019	
Venezuela	Spanish	March 10, 2020	
Papua New Guinea	English	June 10, 2020	
Bangladesh	Bengali, English	September 2, 2020	
Cambodia	Khmer	August 25, 2022	
Laos	Lao	August 25, 2022	
Moldova	Romanian and Russian	March 26, 2024	
Armenia	Armenian and Russian	May 7, 2026	

Locations where YouTube is localized

The YouTube interface suggests which local version should be chosen based on the IP address of the user. In some cases, the message "This video is not available in your country" may appear because of copyright restrictions or inappropriate content. The interface of the YouTube website is available in 76 language versions, including Amharic, Albanian, Armenian, Burmese, Haitian Creole, Kyrgyz, Malagasy, Mongolian, Persian, Samoan, Somali and Uzbek, which do not have local channel versions. Access to YouTube was blocked in Turkey between 2008 and 2010, following controversy over the posting of videos deemed insulting to Mustafa Kemal Atatürk and some material offensive to Muslims. In October 2012, a local version of YouTube was launched in Turkey, with the domain youtube.com.tr. The local version is subject to the content regulations found in Turkish law. In March 2009, a dispute between YouTube and the British royalty collection agency PRS for Music led to premium music videos being blocked for YouTube users in the United Kingdom. The removal of videos posted by the major record companies occurred after failure to reach an agreement on a licensing deal. The dispute was resolved in September 2009. In April 2009, a similar dispute led to the removal of premium music videos for users in Germany.

== Other features ==
On June 21, 2018, YouTube introduced channel memberships and merchandise, which requires a channel with at least 100,000 subscribers (later reduced to 500) and 3000 watch hours to have this feature enabled, which initially offers a single tier at $4.99/month (later expanded from $0.99 to $499.99/month and multiple tiers), when you subscribed to one of those tiers, it unlocks custom badges, emojis, or early access to videos depending what tier you subscribed.
