= MC Stan =

Indian rapper and music producer (born 1999)

Altaf Tadavi
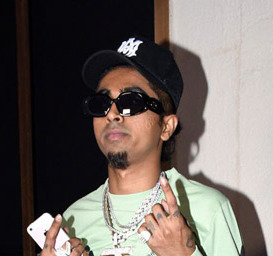
- MC Stan in 2023
- Born: Altaf Tadavi; 30 August 1999 (age 27); Pune, Maharashtra, India
- Occupations: Rapper; singer; lyricist; music producer; composer
- Years active: 2018–present
- Known for: Bigg Boss 16 – Winner; Tadipaar (2020); Insaan (2022); "Haath Varthi" (2023)
- Musical career
- Genres: Hip hop, Desi hip hop, Trap music
- Labels: Hindi Records, T-Series, Independent

Altaf Tadavi (born 30 August 1999), known professionally as MC STAN (stylized as MC ST∆N), is an Indian rapper, lyricist, music producer, and composer who was the winner of Bigg Boss 16 in 2023. He is known for his work in the desi hip-hop and trap music scene.

== Early life ==
Altaf Tadavi was born on 30 August 1999 in Pune, Maharashtra, India. He was raised in a low-income household and developed an interest in music during his adolescence. Initially influenced by qawwali, he later shifted his focus to rap and hip-hop, drawing inspiration from international rap artists as well as the emerging Indian hip-hop scene. He modeled his stage name as a tribute to the song "Stan" by American rapper Eminem.

== Career ==
MC Stan began his music career in 2018 with the release of the track "Wata", which attracted attention for its lyrical content and street-focused themes. His music incorporates Hindi, Marathi, and urban slang, and often addresses themes such as social issues and personal experiences. Stan dissed fellow Mumbai rappers Emiway Bantai and Divine on the track "Samajh Meri Baat Ko", soon after which his YouTube channel was taken down. He also received attention for his diss track, "Khuja Mat", which was allegedly a response to Emiway's track "Samajh Mein Aaya Kya". Stan released the track, "Astaghfirullah" in 2019, which focused on "his struggle for a better life, and seeking God’s forgiveness for his wrongdoings".

Stan released his debut album, Tadipaar, in 2020, which offered a powerful narrative of his life in Tadiwala Road, delving into his daily struggles, poverty, gang affiliations, police brutality and his legal issue, when he was falsely implicated in an attempt to murder case.

In 2021, he also appeared on fellow rap duo Seedhe Maut's mixtape न, on the song "Nanchaku" which received widespread media attention for its prowess in lyricism and delivery.

Stan released his sophomore album, Insaan, in 2022, which was noted for its production style and introspective lyrics. The album featured only two guest appearances, from rappers Ikka and Raftaar. In 2022–2023, MC Stan participated in the sixteenth season of the reality television show Bigg Boss and was declared the winner.

On 16 March 2024, his official YouTube channel was hacked, leading to temporary disruption in his online presence. In the same year, he appeared on the albums Monopoly Moves by King, Ek Tha Raja by Badshah and Only Love Gets Reply by Ikka as a guest feature.

Since 2024, he has been teasing his upcoming album, titled Mehfeel, while dropping tracks like "Kider Manzil", "911 Porsche", "Meri Zindagi Rap Se Pan Deep Hai", and "Numb". He was featured in Rolling Stone India's first edition of the "Future of Music" list in 2024. In 2026, Stan appeared as a guest judge on the show, India's Got Latent.

=== International collaborations ===
In 2023, Stan appeared on a Times Square billboard in New York City as part of a promotional campaign for "Haath Varthi", a collaboration with American music producer KSHMR. The track was included in KSHMR's album Karam and received widespread attention online.

=== Film music ===
Stan has contributed to Hindi film soundtracks, including a rap segment for the 2024 film Baby John and the title track for Farrey in 2023.

== Discography ==
=== Albums ===
Title	Details
Tadipaar	Released: 31 December 2020; Formats: Digital download, streaming
Insaan	Released: 18 February 2022; Formats: Digital download, streaming

=== Collaborations ===
Year	Track	Artist(s)	Producer(s)	Album	References
2021	Nanchaku	Seedhe Maut, MC Stan	Calm	न	
2023	Haath Varthi	MC Stan, KSHMR	KSHMR	Karam	
2024	Drinks On Me	Badshah, MC Stan	zetra, LeKen Taylor	Ek Tha Raja	
2024	F*CK WHAT THEY SAY	King, MC Stan	Riz Shain	Monopoly Moves	
2024	Urvashi	Ikka, MC Stan	Sanjoy	Only Love Gets Reply	

== Controversies ==
=== Protest against concert ===
On 17 March 2023, a concert by MC Stan in Indore, Madhya Pradesh, was interrupted and subsequently cancelled following a protest by members of the Karni Sena. The group accused the rapper of promoting obscene content and using inappropriate language in his music.

The protest took place at a hotel in the Lasudia area, where demonstrators entered the stage after Stan had exited the venue. Law enforcement personnel used minor force to control the crowd. A representative from the Karni Sena stated that they had objected to the performance and demanded the artist leave the premises.

=== Remarks on female rappers ===
During his appearance on the comedy reality show India's Got Latent, his remarks regarding the subject matter being explored in songs by Indian female rappers drew criticism and were termed "sexist" and "misogynistic".

== Accolades ==
Award	Year	Recipient(s) and nominee(s)	Category	Result	Ref
TIMD Awards (Note: TIMD Awards is an independent music award given by The Indian Music Diaries.)	2024	MC Stan	Best Artist Of The Year (Public’s Choice)	Won	
