= Suhani Shah =

Indian mentalist (born 1990)

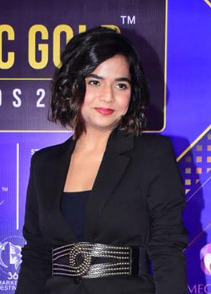
- Shah in 2024
- Born: 29 January 1990 (age 36); Udaipur, Rajasthan, India
- Other name: Jadoo Pari
- Occupations: Mentalist; YouTuber
- Years active: 1997–present

YouTube information
- Channel: Suhani Shah
- Subscribers: 4.77 million
- Views: 1.31 billion
- Last updated: 27 October 2025
- Website: suhanishah.com

Suhani Shah (born 29 January 1990) is an Indian mentalist, mind reader, magician, and YouTuber.

== Early life ==
Suhani Shah was born on 29 January 1990 in Udaipur, Rajasthan in a Marwadi family. She dropped out of her school after the first grade to pursue her passion. She was home-schooled because of her constant tours all over the world. Suhani never had a formal education and says that "experiences have taught more than what a school could or would".

== Career ==
Her first stage show was held at Thakorbhai Desai Hall in Ahmedabad on 22 October 1997. She has won several awards and has been conferred the title of Jadoopari (transl. magic fairy) by the All India Magic Association. As of 2019, she has done more than 5000 shows. She started off as an illusionist and is now a mentalist. She works as a clinical hypnotherapist at her clinic, Suhani Mindcare in Goa. She is a corporate trainer, an author and a counselor, and she has given several TED Talks.

In June 2024, Shah's show, Spellbound, was presented at The Capitol as part of the 2024 RISING: festival in Melbourne.

In February 2025, Shah appeared on the Australian talk show The Project. In 2026, she appeared on the show, India's Got Latent.

== Awards ==
Between July 14-19, Shah won the Best Magic Creator award at FISM 2025 in Torino, Italy. FISM is known as the 'Oscars of Magic', the world's highest recognition for a magician.

== Publications ==
- Shah, Suhani (2006). Unleash Your Hidden Powers. Jaico Publishing House. ISBN 8179926702.

== YouTube ==
She is active on YouTube, where she uploads videos on topics such as illusionism and mentalism. She also has a web show called That's My Job.

== See also ==
- List of Indian YouTubers
