= Harbans Jandu =

Indian composer (died 2025)

Harbans Singh Jandu (died 8 March 2025), also known as Jandu Littranwala, was an Indian music composer associated with Punjabi music.

== Life and career ==
Jandu was born in the village of Littran in Jalandhar District, Punjab.

He first started writing lyrics for Punjabi songs in 1968. He placed first (out of 52 composers) in the Des Pardes paper songwriting competition, with the song "Nachdi di Photo Kich Mundeya", in 1968.

Jandu wrote songs for many famous Bhangra and Punjabi artists, including A.S. Kang, Kuldip Manak, Surinder Shinda, Balwinder Safri, Jazzy B, Sukhshinder Shinda, H-Dhami, Amrinder Gill, Azaad, Alaap, Heera Group UK, Holle Holle, Apna Sangeet, Awaaz, Bhujhangy Group, DCS, Dippa Satrang, Gurcharran Mall, Yudhvir Manak, Sardara Gill, KS Bhamrah, Aman Hayer, Boota Pardesi, Gurdeep Gogi, The Saathies, Karnail Cheema, Silinder Pardesi, Gurdev Kaur, Mastan Heera, ADH, Atma Geet, Mahendra Kapoor, Baldev Mastana, Parmjit Pammi, Kamaljit Neeru, Hrinder Singh Shergill and many others.

Jandu died on 8 March 2025.

== Hit songs ==
Some of his hit songs include:

- "Giddhian Di Raniye" by A.S. Kang
- "Jina Main Tenu Pyar" by A.S. Kang
- "Nachna Punjabhan Da" by A.S. Kang
- "Qawali" by A.S. Kang
- Chan Mere Makhna by Balwinder Safri
- "Vang" and Taubah Taubah by ADH
- "Sardara" by Jazzy B
- "Jithevi Jaan" Punjabi by Azaad
- "Soorma" by Jazzy B
- "Jadu" by Jazzy B
- "Hukam" by Jazzy B, Kuldeep Manak and Yudhveer Manak
- "Rajj Ke Palaa" by Jas Singh/Aman Hayer
- "Mohabat Hogai" by Azaad
- "Jatti Bul Bul Wargi" by Parmjit Pammi
- "Lishke Long Te Jhanjar" by The Saathies
- "Ha La La" – Ajuba (featured on the Bhaji on the Beach film soundtrack)
- Sadke Java - H Dhami
- "Truck" by Bhinda Jatt
- "Jigree" by Bhinda Jatt
- "Haala Laala " by Sukshinder Shinda and Late Mohan Singh Nimanna

== Religious songs ==
Harbans Jandu had also written many religious songs. These include:

- "Babe Nanak Di" by Jazzy B
- "Ik Dhar Hai Babe Nanak Da by Balwant Littranwala
- "Amar Khalsa" by Pardesi
- "Mata Gujri" by Balwinder Safri
- "Jakare Bholan Ge" by Jazzy B
- "Choj Khalse De" by Sukshinder Shinda

== Awards ==
Jandu Littranwala received an accolade from the Chief Minister of Punjab, Parkash Singh Badal, on 20 January 2009 in Hoshiarpur, Punjab, for his contribution in promoting the Punjabi language throughout the world through his song writing.

Jandu Littranwala was presented with the Guest of Honour award at the Lal Chand Yamla Jatt Mela on 26 December 2008.

- Asian Pop Awards: four times Best Lyricist, from 1982
- UK Asian Pop Awards: Best Lyricist, 1992
- Nand Lal Nooorpuri Award, 2005
- Tricentury Khalsa Award Southampton, 1999
- Punjab Times and Des Pardes Best writer Award, 1996
- Lyallpur Khalsa College, Jalandhar – honorary award for promoting Punjabi language and culture worldwide through his songs
- BBC Radio WM, 2004
- Best Songwriter award 2004, by Punjabi Cultural Society, Coventry
- Youth Sports Award, Littran 2004/2007 for promoting Punjabi language and culture worldwide through his songs
- Punjabi Kala Manch Kohinoor Award for Best Songwriter
- Sandwell Council awarded him for promoting Punjabi language and culture worldwide through his songs
- Wolverhampton City Council awarded him for promoting Wolverhampton worldwide through his songs, 2008
- House Of Commons Cultural Award, 2006
- House of Commons Award Vaiskahi, 2007
- Awarded Gold Medal for Best Lyricist in Vancouver, British Columbia, Canada
- Awarded Gold Medal for Best Songwriter in Jalandhar, India
- Awarded Gold Medal for Best Lyricist by Lal Chand Yamla Jatt Trust in Birmingham, UK
- Awarded Gold Medal for Best Lyricist by Dev Thrikewala Appreciation Trust in Derby, UK
- Awarded Gold Medal for Best Lyricist by Leamington Mela Committee in Leamington, UK
- Awarded Gold Medal for Best Songwriter by Punjabi Sath, Walsall, UK
