= Multitone Records =

- Founded: 10/19/1978
- Founder: Pran Gohil
- Status: Dormant
- Distributors: M.S. Distributing Co. (in the US); Sony Music (India)
- Genre: Bhangra
- Country of origin: UK

Multitone Records, originally Savera Investments, was a British record label founded by Pran Gohil in 1978. Pran was formerly Regional Manager of Polygram, Asia Pacific based in the Netherlands and also Executive Chairman of Spartan Records, London. Multitone Records specialized in bhangra style dance music. The genre was commercialized by Multitone Records, which is considered to be the pioneer of British Bhangra. During its lifetime under Managing Director Jitesh Gohil the label focused on the cross-over potential of British Bhangra into the mainstream market.

In August 1992, Multitone Records formed a historic strategic alliance with BMG Entertainment which acquired majority stake in the company. Public backing of John Preston Chairman of BMG coincided with a watershed moment for the genre.

In a press release by BMG, John Preston famously said "Bhangra is getting bigger and bigger ... It is only a matter of time before a Bhangra record is a number one hit all over the world." This quote was heavily featured the British media including The Guardian, The Independent, and Music Week all of which highlighted John Preston's bullish stance on bhangra's mainstream potential.

Multitone artists formed the "who's who" of the British bhangra scene including The Safri Boyz, DCS, XLNC, Sasha, Amar, Apna Sangeet, Alaap, Chirag Pehchan and many more. A number of Multitone's records entered the UK and International charts including "People of the world" by Sasha, "Take me higher" by Bindushri and "Tu Hai Mera Sanam" by Amar, a Hindi version of "I will always love you" by Whitney Houston. Multitone's music also entered the market on the Indian subcontinent with hits like "Patel rap" by Bali, and hits of Abba in Hindi by Salma and Sabina Agha. The company began distribution in the United States on 27 June 1994 through M.S. Distributing Co. Paul Bernard was appointed as the U.S. representative of the company. The US debut featured albums by Pammi and XLNC

Following the buyout of BMG by Sony Music in 2008, the label became one of the subsidiaries of Sony Music Entertainment UK Holdings Ltd. where it was listed "dormant"

Subsequently, Multitone Records catalogue was acquired by Moviebox Records International Birmingham who revamped the collection and launched the Bhangra Legends collections and also gave birth to the Legends Band.

.

== Labeled bands ==
- Alaap
- Azaad
- Apna Sangeet
- Premi Group
- Achanak
- DCS
- Pammi
- Sahotas (signed in 1988)
- XLNC
- Chirag Pehchan
- Salma and Sabina Agha

== See also ==
- Bhangra (music)
- List of bhangra bands
- BMG
- List of Record Labels
