= List of bhangra artists =

This is an alphabetical list of notable bhangra bands and solo artists.

- Abrar-ul-Haq
- Achanak
- Alaap
- Aman Hayer
- Amar Arshi
- Apna Sangeet
- Avtar Singh Kang
- B21
- Babbu Maan
- Bally Sagoo
- Bhujhangy Group
- Bombay Talkie
- Bombay Rockers
- Chirag Pehchan
- Daler Mehndi
- Diljit Dosanjh
- DCS
- Dr Zeus
- Dhol Foundation, The
- Gippy Grewal
- Gurdas Maan
- Heera
- Harbhajan Mann
- Imran Khan
- Intermix
- Josh
- Jasmine Sandlas
- Jazzy B
- Juggy D
- Kaka Bhaniawala
- Karan Aujla
- Kulwinder Dhillon
- Lehmber Hussainpuri
- Malkit Singh
- Ms Scandalous
- Panjabi MC
- Parmish Verma
- Punjabi by Nature
- Ranjit Bawa
- RDB
- Rishi Rich
- Sahotas
- Sardool Sikander
- Sharry Mann
- Sukhbir
- Sukshinder Shinda
- Swami
- Tarsame Singh Saini
- Tru Skool
- Tigerstyle
- Yo Yo Honey Singh
- Zack Knight
