= Nawa Pind Shonkia Da =

Nawa Pind Shonkia Da Nawa Pind Arayian
- village
- Nickname: Nawa Pind
- Location in Punjab, India Nawa Pind Shonkia Da (India)
- Coordinates: 31.105°N 75.532°E
- Country: India
- State: Punjab
- District: Jalandhar
- Talukas: Nakodar

Languages
  - Official: Punjabi
  - Regional: Punjabi
- Time zone: UTC+5:30 (IST)
- PIN: 144043
- Telephone code: 0181
- Vehicle registration: PB- 08
- Nearest city: Nakodar
- Website: www.nawapind.webs.com

Nawa Pind Shonkia Da (In English - Modern village of stylish people) also known as Nawa Pind and Nawa Pind Arayian Da is a village in Nakodar. Nakodar is a tehsil in the city Jalandhar of Indian state of Punjab. It was previously known as Nawa Pind Arian Da because of its large Muslim Arain population; even today that name is often used in official files.

A way marker marking the limits of the village

== Name ==
It is believed that in the later part of nineteenth century when umbrellas were not very common in India, people of Nawa Pind used to use umbrellas in hot sun and that's how people started calling them stylish. By the turn of the twentieth century nearly every household in the village had a family member who had migrated to East Africa for work. On returning home these people would bring back gifts such as umbrellas, not cover against rain but the sun! But that is only one part of the story. Nawa Pind was a very modern pind at that time even in comparison to towns and cities in British India. Majority of the houses were brick built with modern facilities and the streets were brick paved. There was a school in the village paid for and run by the villagers. Nawa Pind came into existence in later part of the eighteenth century. Unlike now, it was barren land and the first building in the village was somewhere near to where the playground is, previously a pond. Hence the name, Nawa Pind (New Village) with the reference 'Shonkia Da' added later. Before partition the majority population was Arian Muslims. There were few Sikh and Christian families in the village too. Their ancestry could be traced back to the first village founder. After the partition the whole of the village, except for those still residing in East Africa, migrated to Pakistan but fate would have it that most would get reunited again in the United Kingdom.

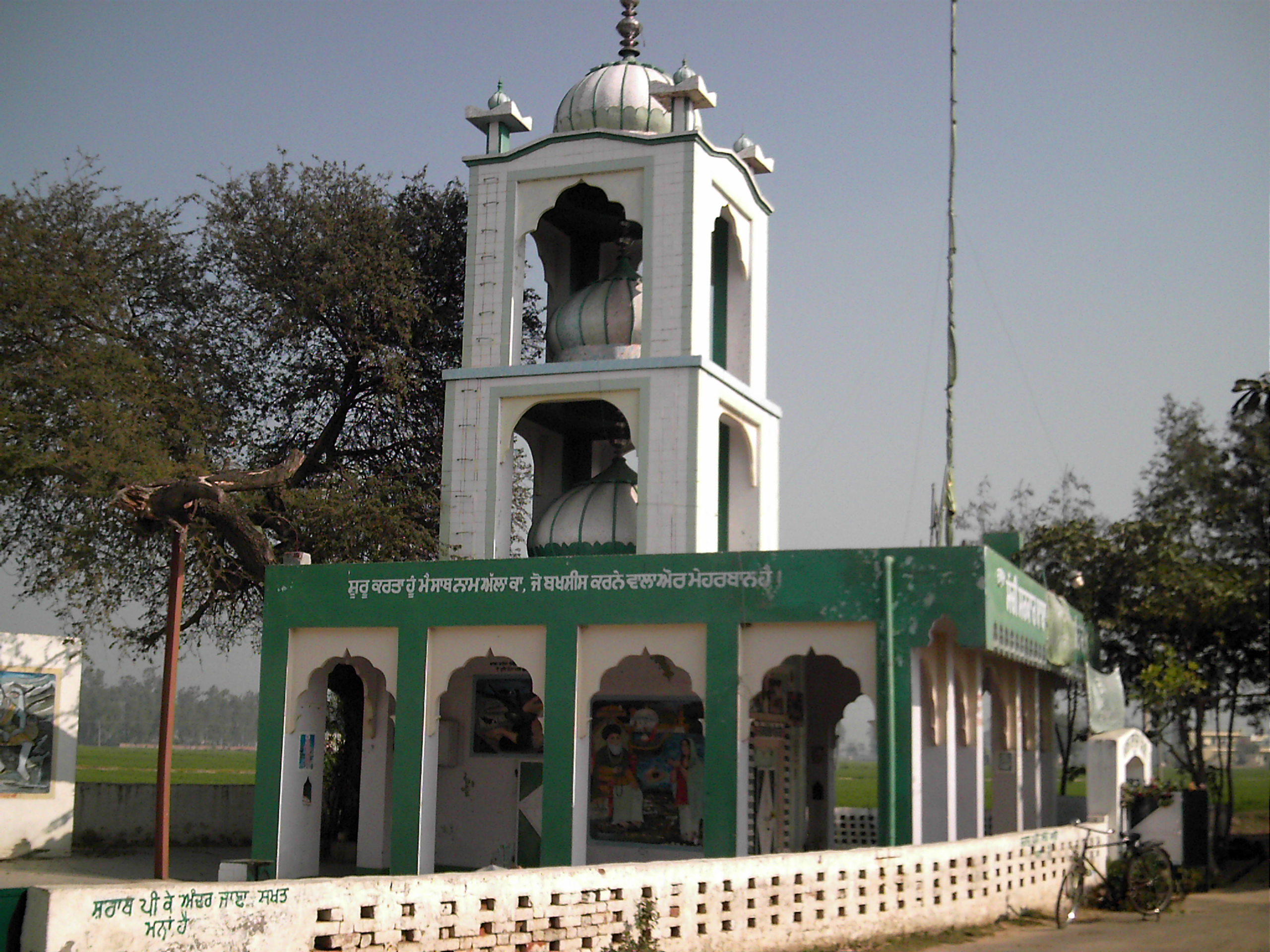
The Temple of Baba Bhole Peer

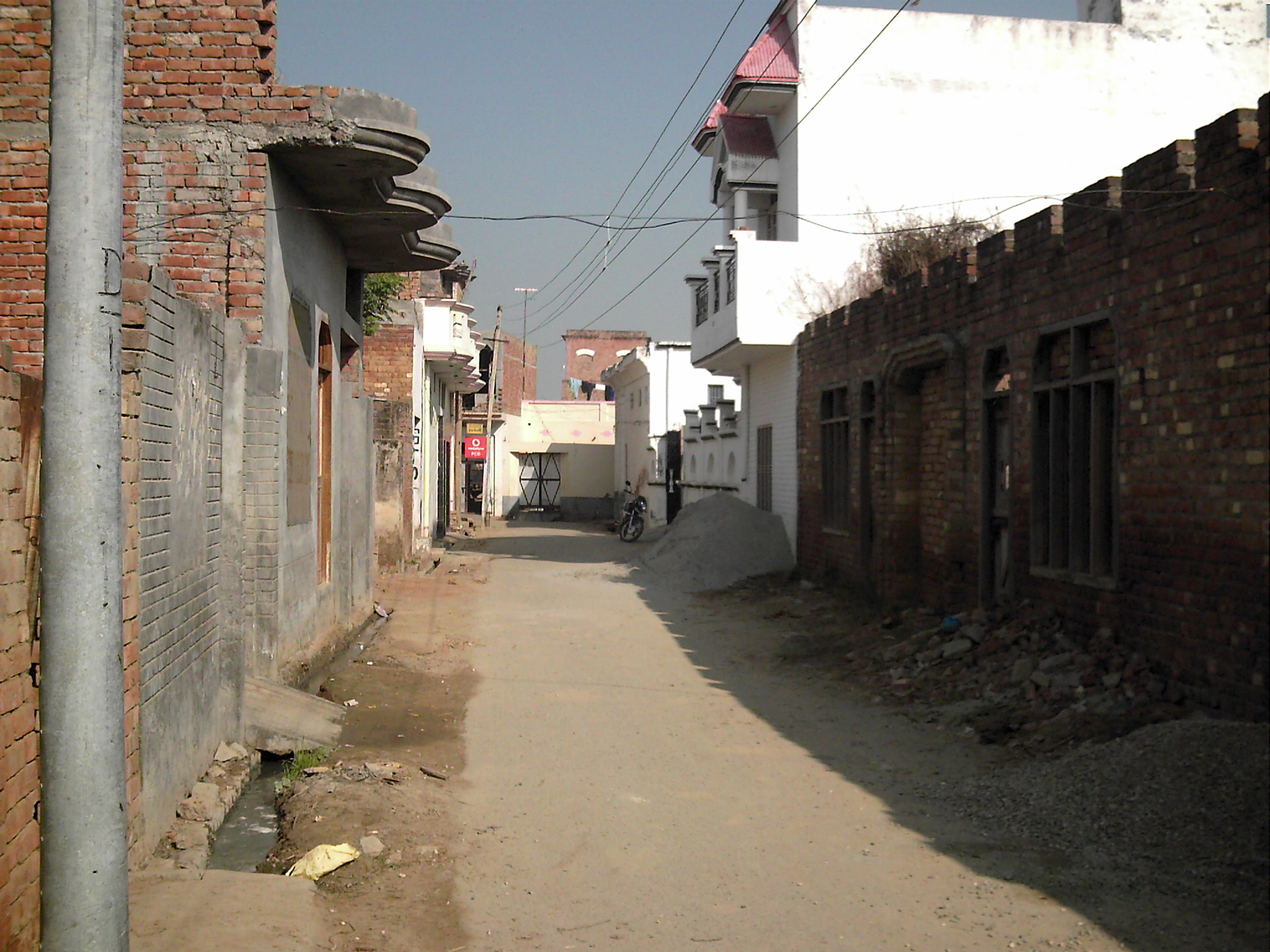
A view of a Nawa Pind alley

Sarkari Elementary School (Sarkari is "Government" in Punjabi)

== About Nawa Pind ==
Nawa Pind is famous for the temple of Baba Bhole Peer (Bhole Peer da mela 13 Haad i.e. Gathering of people on 13 Haad which lies somewhere in the mid of May of Christian calendar).

It is connected by railways through the railway station Sidhwan. It is also connected to addhi Khuyi which lies in the mid of Nakodar and Nurmahal. Nawa Pind is almost 425 kilometers from New Delhi and approximately 120 kilometers from Amritsar. It lies between the city Nakodar and Nurmahal. People in this village are mostly Sikhs and Hindus. It is said that before the partition of India it was a Muslims village, but after the partition of India and creation of Pakistan Muslims moved to Pakistan. The neighbouring village of Nawa Pind are Sidhwan, Bir Pind, Sanghe Jagir, Littran and Sanghe Khalsa.
