= Bhamra =

Bhamra, (alternatively spelt Bhamrah, Bhambra Bumrah Bamrah; Punjabi: ਭਮਰਾ) is a Punjabi surname Notable people with the surname include:

- Jasprit Bumrah, Indian cricketer
- Kuljit Bhamra (born 1959), British composer, record producer and musician
- Mohinder Kaur Bhamra (born 1940s), British singer
- Satnam Singh Bhamara, Indian basketball player
- Samir Bhamra, British artist, playwright, costume designer, producer and musical theatre director
