= Janu =

Janu may refer to:

- Janů, a Czech surname, including a list of people with the name
- Janu, a clan of Jats originally from Jandwa
