= Mohinder Kaur Bhamra =

British singer

- Born: Uganda
- Occupation: Vocalist
- Instruments: Harmonium, dholki

Mohinder Kaur Bhamra (born 1936) is a British singer of Punjabi folk music, ghazals and Sikh hymns. Some of her songs have highlighted issues that concern British Indian women.

Bhamra encouraged British Indian women to join in traditional dance and party celebrations at a time when they were typically excluded. Her early popular party pieces include Giddha pao haan deo, maar maar ke tali (Dance ladies dance. Clap your hands), Ni aae na Vilayat kurye (Don't come to England girl) and Raatan chad de ve (Stop working the nightshift my dear).

== Early life and education ==
Mohinder Kaur Bhamra was born in Uganda when it was a British colony. She moved to British India at around age five or six. She attended a state school in Ludhiana and took up evening classes in Sikh theology and classical music at the Guru Angad Dev Punjab College. Her early childhood recollections include being asked by her teachers to sing India's national anthem, Jana Gana Mana, for Jawaharlal Nehru and Vijaya Lakshmi Pandit when they visited her school.

In her early teens she moved to Kenya and completed her Indian music studies by post. She began singing in Gurdwaras in Kisumu and then, after her marriage, in Nairobi. There, in 1959, she gave birth to her first son, Kuljit. She learnt to play the harmonium and adapted the music to popular songs.

== Early life in England ==
In 1961, Bhamra moved to England with her son and joined her husband who had already been studying civil engineering in London.

In England, following the birth of her second son Satpaul, and after regularly attending gurdwaras in Shepherd's Bush and Stepney Green where she sang, played the dholki and read prayers, people began to invite Bhamra to sing at celebrations, and by 1966 she was performing at weddings. Before finally settling in Southall, London, in 1968, she had lived at Finsbury Park, Muswell Hill and Palmers Green. Bhamra held several brief jobs including six months at a crochet knit company, time at a mailing office and spent one Christmas period sticking labels onto packets of sausages at a sausage factory.

In her early career, Bhamra would sing at Sikh wedding ceremonies in the mornings followed in the afternoon with performing at the reception party. Her son Kuljit, who played the tabla, accompanied her, later followed by his two younger brothers. In 1978 her family group joined A.S. Kang.

== 1980s onwards ==
By 1981, Kang's performance of Gidhian Di Raniye (Dancing queen) and Bhamra's of Giddha pao haan deo, maar maar ke tali (Dance ladies dance. Clap your hands) became successful party pieces. Over the subsequent decade, as one of only a few female singers in a mostly male dominated bhangra industry, Bhamra encouraged British Indian women to join in traditional dance and party celebrations at a time when they were typically excluded. In Kuljit's account published in 2018, she was singing at one party when she noticed the segregated women peeping through gaps in the doors, following which she stopped the music and instructed the men to take their seats and allow the women in to dance; it proved an instant hit with the women. He recounted that by the late 1980s, it became acceptable for both men and women to be on the dance floor together.

Bhamra became known for Punjabi folk music, ghazals and Sikh hymns, and songs based on migration, working in the UK and the bonding between Indian women in the UK. In 1981, Bhamra recorded her album Kuri Southall Di (The girl from Southall). Another early popular song was Ni aae na Vilayat kurye (Don't come to England girl). It was a cautionary tale aimed at young girls in India who might assume that coming to England to marry might free them from purdah; it warned of the lie by the man who would bring them to England, and of being sent to work in factories by their close relatives, having to conform to the cold and to shift work and housework. M. S. Khaira from the Midlands wrote the lyrics having seen the plight of such women in West Midlands factories. The effect of the song was that it connected Punjabi women in Britain with their unknown girlfriends in India through music and provided a place for the relationships of wife, husband, children, mother-in-law and daughter-in-law. In an interview with her niece Tej Purewal 'The sound of memory' (2012), Bhamra recalled that in the 1970s that song particularly resonated with her audiences and she would be frequently requested to sing it. In Raatan chad de ve (Stop working the nightshift my dear), a wife pleads with her husband to give up his night shifts and resolve her lonely nights. In response, he highlights that they need the income to live on. The lyrics were again written by Khaira, and Bhamra recalled that it touched the sentiments of her audiences who remembered their hard times. She has since been seen as unique in reflecting issues relating to Indian women in Britain.

In 1982, she released the album Punjabi Disco, produced by her son Kuljit Bhamra while she provided the vocals. It was the first album to combine bhangra with electronic dance music. Kuljit produced the album using a Roland SH-1000 synthesizer and Roland Compurhythm CR-8000 drum machine. The album anticipated elements of acid house music, while also featuring elements of disco, funk and psychedelic music. The album was initially a commercial failure, but later developed a cult following after its rediscovery in the early 21st century, leading to a re-release in 2025.
