= Kamaljit Neeru =

Indian singer and actress

Kamaljit Neeru, or simply Neeru, is an Indian singer and actress in Punjabi films and music. She is known for her stage performances as well has her vocal quality. She has released a total of ten albums to date. Her most popular songs to date are: "Seeti Te Seeti", "Jadon Mera Lak Hilda", "Rurha Mandi Jave" and "Bhij Gaye Kurti Laal".

== Biography ==
Neeru began her career as a hobby in England in 1982, at the time, the Punjabi community there was beginning to create its own musical identity. Originally Punjabi music had all come from the Punjab, but there was a small Bhangra community in its infancy which was gaining popularity quite quickly. This was led by artists such as Alaap Group, Heera Group, Apna Sangeet, A. S. Kang and DCS.

One day, while having dinner, a family friend Baldev Mastana who was a well-known music director in England asked Neeru to join his group The Saathi’s.

Neeru's first album was a collaboration with other artists, Duppatte Kale Urde which was released in 1982 with His Master's Voice. In this Album, Neeru performed her single Behja Behja Hoju Mitra.

Following the success of her single in the album, Neeru went on to release 9 solo albums and 7 collaborations with other artists such as Hans Raj Hans, Sardool Sikander, Harbhajan Mann, Sabar Koti, Satwinder Bugga, Amar Noori and the late Parminder Sandhu.

When she began her career, it was very difficult for a female singer to receive any degree or measurable success as a stage artist in the male dominated environment of Punjabi music, however she was able to break through these barriers and gain considerable success.

Neeru has performed in almost each and every town and city in Punjab, India. She has performed in New Zealand, Australia, Dubai, Singapore, Malaysia, Holland, England, Canada and America.

Neeru most recently has released three singles between 2017 and 2018 including "Jago Wali Raat" and her first devotional song "Tor Dita Lalan Nu". In addition, she has been active on Punjabi television as a judge on Miss PTC Punjabi in all seasons during 2017 and 2018 along with judging Mr. Punjab (Canada episode) in 2017.

== Personal life ==
Neeru is originally from Khanna, India. She is one of five siblings. Her father was an officer in the Indian Military and due to this she traveled throughout India as a child. While in school, she was an avid track and field player and also took interest in swimming. Prior to her marriage, she was studying for her pre-medical avenue of education, however, when she was married, she moved to the United Kingdom in 1980 putting her education on hold and beginning her hobby in singing which became her profession.

Neeru currently resides in Vancouver with her husband and her son.

== Discography ==
Year	Album	Record label
1987	Dance with Neeru	Sonotone (India), VIP Music (International)
1988	Ishq Brandi	Saga (India), VIP Music (International)
1989	Poison	Saga (India), VIP Music (International)
1990	Meri Jaan Chali Ay	T-Series
1991	Tera Pyaar Chahida	Saga (India), VIP Music (International)
1994	Munde Nachan Na Dinde	T-Series
1997	Jadon Mera Lak Hilda	Tips (India), Music Waves (International)
2000	Seeti Te Seeti	Tips (India), Music Waves (International)
2003	Jugni	Lucky Stars (India), Planet Records (International)
2017	Tere Ishq Ch (Single)	PTC Motion Pictures
2017	Tor Dita Lalan Nu (Single)	PTC Motion Pictures
2018	Jago Wali Raat (Single)	PTC Punjabi

== Mixed albums ==
Year	Album	Record label
1982	Sir Te Dupatte Kale Urde	His Master's Voice
1993	Jug Jug Jeyon Bhabian	Saga
1994	Welcome '94 (Roora Mandi Jave)	Catrak
1996	Nakhra '96 (Dhola Mera Bada Shikari)	
1997	Nakhra '97 (Gande Naal Pinda Daaru)	Music Waves
1998	Nakhra '98 (Pateela Kharke)	Sur Sangam
1998	Das Ki Hoor Ujaren Gi	Music Waves
2004	Ik Tara Bole (Teri Ban Jawan)	Planet Records

== Filmography ==
Year	Title	Language	Role
1987	Jako Raakhe Saaiyan	Punjabi	Labhu's love interest
1997	Sardari	Punjabi	Self/playback singer
1999	Vidroh	Punjabi	Playback Singer
2019	Laiye Je Yaariyan	Punjabi	Raunak's Mom
2021	Honsla Rakh	Punjabi	Mom
2022	PR	Punjabi	Supporting
2023	Pind America	Punjabi	Supporting
2024	Ucha Dar Babe Nanak Da	Punjabi	Supporting
