= Daytimer (rave) =

South Asian British club culture

A daytimer, sometimes called a daytime rave or Bhangra Do, is a type of rave which was popular with young South Asian British people during the late 1980s and early 1990s. Daytimers predominantly featured bhangra music played by live bands or DJs, but also spanned various other dance genres. They were held during the daytime in order to accommodate their young South Asian audience, to whom nightlife was not readily accessible as a result of cultural norms and racist treatment. Daytimers took place in cities across England, with some of the most prominent daytimer cultures in Birmingham, Bradford and West London.

== History ==
The South Asian diaspora in the United Kingdom grew significantly in the second half of the 20th century due to migration directly from the Indian subcontinent and by the South Asian diaspora in East Africa and the Caribbean. Bhangra Do's emerged in England in the 1980s to appeal to this growing Desi audience.

The reason why daytimers were held during the daytime is often credited to the inaccessibility of nightlife to young second-generation immigrants due to cultural norms and strict parenting. Daytime raves gave these youths a greater sense freedom as they could skip school or lie to their parents in order to attend. Additionally, Rani Kaur (DJ Radical Sista) has highlighted that mainstream British media did not cater to a Desi audience in the '80s, so South Asian youths sought and created spaces where they could listen to bhangra music together. DJ Ritu suggested that clubs were reluctant to give Asian DJs and performers night-time spots in part due to the violence which often resulted from religious tensions and school rivalries amongst attendees, which may have contributed to the unusual scheduling of daytime raves. Furthermore, ethnic minorities were sometimes denied access to mainstream nightclubs by racist bouncers, driving demand for daytimers as an accepting space for South Asian communities.

When daytimers first emerged in the '80s, they featured live bhangra bands and hosted small audiences of a few hundred attendees, usually sporting the traditional attire they would wear at home. The music was considered the focal point of the raves. In the '90s, daytimers became bigger raves, sometimes hosting thousands, and began to favour DJs over live bands, and playing a blend of bhangra and other dance music. Fashion and self-expression became increasingly central, with streetwear and a Western-Asian style amalgamation becoming more common. Attendees reported bringing outfits and makeup to change into and out of at the venue to avoid getting in trouble with their parents.

Photographer Tim Smith, who documented daytimers in Bradford, thought that the daytimer phenomenon was short-lived, only lasting for five or six years. The short lifespan of the daytimer movement is unsurprising and was perhaps inevitable, following the established tradition of club cultures accommodating ad hoc communities which rarely last longer than a few years. Bobby Friction recalled that nightclubs became more open-minded towards Asian DJs and promoters in the mid-'90s, perhaps due the success of club night Bombay Jungle, initiating a shift towards night-time events. The daytimer scene declined around this time and had died out by the end of the 20th century. This has also been attributed to shifts in interests and cultural standards and the increasing inclusivity of mainstream society.

== Music ==
Music was the focal point of daytime raves. They provided a platform for bhangra music, which was otherwise difficult to access, since bhangra records were not readily available in mainstream music shops, relegated to the nebulous category of 'World Music'.

In the early days of daytimers, bhangra bands like Alaap and Heera dominated the scene, playing live sets to full houses. As the daytimer culture shifted away from live music, DJs like Bobby Friction, DJ Ritu and DJ Radical Sista made their names on the scene. As well as playing bhangra tracks, DJs would play R&B, and hip-hop tracks, later mixing in genres such as jungle, ragga and UK garage as mainstream dance music evolved.

From the 1990s, daytimer DJs increasingly played tracks from the emerging genre of post-bhangra or Asian fusion music by artists like Taz Stereo Nation and Panjabi Hit Squad. More specific fusion genres also emerged, such as the bhangramuffin (bhangra and ragga) popularised by Apache Indian and the Bollywood remixes of Bally Sagoo.

== In media ==
In Bend It Like Beckham (2002), Jess implored her parents to see that she was a well-behaved daughter, comparing herself to her sister who bunked off school to attend daytime raves.

Riz Ahmed wrote and directed the short film Daytimer (2014), which followed a young boy to his first daytimer, exploring the religious tensions which could emerge.

Episode 3 of the BBC miniseries Back In Time For Birmingham followed two South Asian teenagers to a re-enactment of a 1980s daytimer.

== Revival ==
Whilst the daytimer scene had ended by the turn of the 21st century, the 2020s have seen a revival movement in an effort to celebrate South Asian British music and heritage.

The Daytimers creative collective, founded in 2020, holds club nights inspired by the daytime raves of the '80s and '90s. They have attracted mainstream attention, with events having been held at the Barbican Centre, and a collaboration with Boomtown festival to take place in August 2026.

Desi Live UK has hosted daytime clubbing events since 2024, marketed towards those who attended the original daytime raves.
