= Kuljit Bhamra =

British musician (born 1959)

Kuljit Bhamra MBE
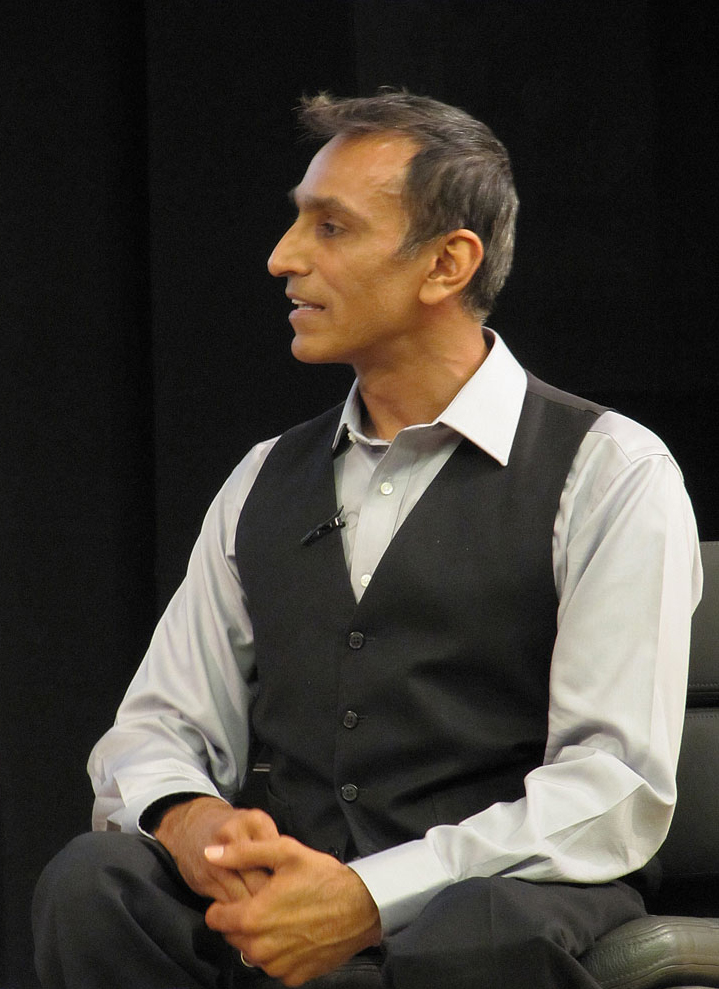

Background information
- Born: Nairobi, Kenya
- Origin: Southall, London, England, UK
- Genres: Bhangra, Indian Classical, World Music, Jazz, Crossover
- Occupations: Percussionist, record producer, composer
- Instruments: Tabla, percussion
- Years active: 1965 – present
- Label: Keda Records

Kuljit Bhamra MBE (born 1959) is a British composer, record producer and musician whose main instrument is the tabla. He is best known as one of the record producers who pioneered the British Bhangra sound and for his many collaborations with musicians (including Premi Group and Heera Group UK through Keda Records) from different genres and continents. He was appointed MBE in the Queen's Birthday Honours 2009 with the citation "For services to Bhangra and British Asian Music".

== Early life and influences ==
Kuljit Bhamra was born in Nairobi, Kenya. His grandfather was an Indian artisan sent to Kenya by the British Raj. Bhamra contracted polio when he was one year old, which affected his left leg. This disability eventually led him to play the tabla whilst seated (similar to a drummer playing a drum kit) rather than seated on the floor – the usual practice for tabla players.

Bhamra's father had gone to England to study civil engineering and in 1961 Kuljit and his mother joined him there. In 1968 they settled in Southall which has been Bhamra's home town ever since.

Bhamra taught himself to play the tabla at the age of six and accompanied his mother, Mohinder Kaur Bhamra, who was a popular singer at weddings and public functions. Later, with Bhamra's two brothers playing accordion and mandolin, Mohinder Kaur recorded a number of albums that became successful – being sold through a network of corner shops in the Asian community.

On the insistence of his father, Bhamra trained as a civil engineer at Middlesex University and then worked for Richmond Council for a while.

== Career ==
In 1982, he debuted with the album Punjabi Disco, featuring his mother Mohinder Kaur Bhamra as the singer. It was the first album to combine bhangra with electronic dance music. He produced the album using a Roland SH-1000 synthesizer and Roland Compurhythm CR-8000 drum machine. The album anticipated elements of acid house music, while also featuring elements of disco, funk and psychedelic music. The album was initially a commercial failure, but later developed a cult following after its rediscovery in the early 21st century, leading to a re-release in 2025.

In 1983, he produced and arranged an album for Premi – a Southall-based singer who introduced Bhamra to another new band Heera. The band's debut album, produced by Bhamra, was played back to back with Premi's, 24 hours a day, on the Asian pirate radio station Sina Radio (now Sunrise Radio). Using multitrack recording techniques whilst combining Indian percussion with western instruments and live orchestral violins, Bhamra went on to produce numerous albums for both British and Indian artists. Some of his productions became internationally successful and included songs such as "Rail Gaddi" (by Chirag Pehchan); "Pyar Ka Hai Bairi" (by Sangeeta); "Giddha Pao Haan Deo" (by Mohinder Kaur Bhamra); "Peer Tere Jaan Di" (by Gurdas Maan); "Aj Tenoon Nachna Pao" (by Mahendra Kapoor); "Patel Rap" (by Bali), "Nachdi Di Gooth Khulgaye" (by Premi) and "Jag Wala Mela" (by Heera).

In 1986, Bhamra established Keda Records, an independent record label committed to producing high-quality cassettes and LPs.

Bhamra was profiled in the 1992 movie Confusion, a Black Arts Video Project funded by the Arts Council of Great Britain.

Bhamra gave up his career as a civil engineer in 1994 to concentrate on music. He purchased The Yard recording studio (situated next to Westar Studios in Southall) and renamed it Red Fort Studios. Later in 1999, he became the owner of the whole complex after not renewing the lease for Westar Studios.

In 2000, Bhamra began a long history of collaboration with jazz saxophonist Andy Sheppard when they worked on the album Dancing Man & Woman. Bhamra went on to produce many joint compositions, performances and recordings, including his debut album for ECM Records in 2010, Movements in Colour. During this time, he further developed his playing styles and extended his tabla kit to include other percussion instruments, such as snare drum, cymbals and various hand-held percussion.

In 2001, Bhamra composed and directed the music for a production of the Ramayana, which debuted at the Birmingham Repertory Theatre and went on to the Royal National Theatre London.

From 2002 to 2004, he performed as on-stage percussionist in Andrew Lloyd Webber's musical Bombay Dreams at The Apollo Theatre, London. Bhamra also was "dialect coach" for the production. Occasionally, audience members came to the front of the auditorium and danced to his drumming at the end of the show.

Bhamra provided the Indian music for the musical The Far Pavilions based on the novel of the same name by M. M. Kaye. It ran from 14 April 2005 till 17 September 2005 at the Shaftesbury Theatre in London. He continued his involvement in British Asian theatre productions and wrote the music for shows including Layla Majnun (Midlands Art Centre, July 2003); Deranged Marriage (Theatre Royal Stratford, Riverside Studios and Theatre Royal Windsor, 2005 to 2008), and Lion of Punjab (Watermans Art Centre, 2009).

In 2009, Bhamra was featured artist at Salisbury International Arts Festival and curated six events during the 16 days of the festival, including a musical event at dusk at Stonehenge, bringing together dancers, musicians and a shamanistic singer.

Bhamra was the last artistic director of the Society for the Promotion of New Music before its merger and renaming to Sound and Music – the first British Asian to hold this post in its 60-year history. Projects included Bhangra Latina, the creation of a tabla notation system called Tablature!, Folk From Here with Kathryn Tickell, Raga Mela with BBC Concert Orchestra at Royal Festival Hall and an ongoing educational projects to demystify Indian music and teaching – making learning and playing of Indian music more accessible.

In April 2009 Bhamra, along with film director and playwright Shakila Maan and photographer Ammy Phull launched the Southall Story – a project based around a website that celebrates the achievements of the people of this area of West London. The Southall Story exhibition was opened by film director and Southall resident Gurinder Chadha OBE at the Southbank Centre as part of the Alchemy Festival (7 April 2010 to 11 May 2010). On 17 June 2009, the British Library hosted a discussion evening entitled Southall: Music and Life.

Bhamra led the musical finale of the Liberty Festival in Trafalgar Square on 5 September 2009. This event was created to showcase the breadth of artistic work and performance being created by deaf and disabled people and was supported by the Mayor of London Boris Johnson and the Arts Council England.

In 2010, Bhamra wrote a number of specially commissioned pieces of Indian music for Trinity Guildhall (Trinity College London), for their grading examinations in electronic keyboard. This was the first time that Indian pieces have appeared in the syllabus. Pieces included Ghazal and Bollywood Love Song

The University of Exeter awarded Bhamra a Doctorate in Music in July 2010.

== Musical output ==
=== Selected discography ===
==== As performer ====
- A S Kang – Jawani (1976)
- Hans Raj Hans – Jogian De Kannan Wich (1982)
- TV Personalities – Seminal Twang /Closer To God (1992)
- Luke Haynes (Auteurs) – Baader Meinhof (1995)
- Anne Dudley – A Different Light (2001)
- Andy Sheppard – Dancing Man and Woman (2002)
- Sarah Brightman – Harem – Love's Never Easy (2003)
- Ringo Starr – Ringo Rama (2003)
- Mike Lindup (Level 42) – Conversations with Silence (2004)
- Faye Rochelle – "Reflections" {2004}
- Enrique Iglesias – Driving (2005)
- Britten Sinfonia & Joanna MacGregor – Bach Meets Moondog (2006)
- Andy Sheppard – Glossolalia (2007)
- Xavier Crochet (2007)
- Andy Sheppard & Kuljit Bhamra – Live at St George's Bristol (2007)
- John Heavens – (2007)
- Andy Sheppard – Movements in Colour (2009)
- Shakira – Gypsy live for television (2010)
- Sugababes – About a Girl, Radio 1 Live Lounge (2010)
- Cevanne Horrocks-Hopayian – "Big Ears" (2012)
- Sunday Driver (band) - "Flo" (2014)

==== As producer and composer ====
- Mohinder Kaur Bhamra – Punjabi Disco (1982)
- Azaad Group – Nachdi Jawani (1986)
- Mohinder Kaur Bhamra featuring K Deep – Punjabi Geet (1978)
- Mohinder Kaur Bhamra featuring C Bawa- Kuri Southall Di (1981)
- Bhujhangy Group – BHujhANGy(RA) (1989)
- Sangeeta – A Breath of Fresh Bhangra Air (1991)
- Bittu – Dhol Attack (1992)
- Reshma & Mangal – Gentle Touch (1993)
- Maqbool Sabri – Awargi (1995)
- Pandit Jasraj – Pandit Jasraj
- Anup Jalota – Classical Mood (1995)
- Singh Bandhu – Gavo Sachi Bani
- Anu Malik – Eyes
- Sultan Khan & Nusrat Fateh Ali Khan – Pukaar (2001)
- Alex Wilson – Inglaterra (2007)
- Kuljit Bhamra – Subterfuge Invitro (2007)
- Kuljit Bhamra – Bhangra Latina (2008)
- Various artists – The Birth of Southall Bhangra (2010)

==== Platinum Disc Awards ====
- Premi – Chhamak Jehi Mutiyaar (1984)
- Heera – Jag Wala Mela (1984)
- Premi – Nachdi Di Gooth Khulgaye (1986)
- Sangeeta – Flower in the Wind
- Chirag Pechan – Rail Gaddi (1989)
- Kuljit Bhamra & Shan Chana – Himalaya Dawn (2006)

==== Gold Disc Awards ====
- Mahendra Kapoor – Bhabi Gal Na Kari (1987)
- Gurdas Maan – Peer Tere Jaan Di (1988)
- Bali – Patel Rap (1989)
- Mohinder Kaur Bhamra – Giddha Pao Haan Deo (1991)
- Sangeeta – Flower in The Wind (1992)

=== Notable collaborations ===
Cascade – A jazz collective formed of Aidan O'Rourke (fiddle), Andy Sheppard (saxophones), Sheema Mukherjee (sitar), Simon Thoumire (concertina) and Bhamra (tabla). Cascade premiered at the London Jazz Festival on Sunday 19 November 2006 in the Purcell Room and then toured around the UK. The project was commissioned with funds from the PRS Foundation, Esmée Fairbairn Charitable Trust and Scottish Arts Council.

Bhangra Latina – mixing bhangra music with Latin American rhythms, this project with Alex Wilson (musician) and Cevanne Horrocks-Hopayian (composer) also brought Latin dancers and Sikh dancers together on stage at the Queen Elizabeth Hall on 21 September 2008.

Raga Mela – With the BBC Concert Orchestra, Bhamra created a multi-cultural programme blending sounds of India with the spirit of the West. A set of workshops that culminated in a live event at the Royal Festival Hall (6 May 2009) and featured renowned Bollywood playback singer Kavita Krishnamurty and a 350 piece choir of school children. The performance was also broadcast on BBC Radio 3 (19 May 2009)

With composer and pianist David Braun-White, Bhamra formed the Ku-Da-Mix Orchestra, which debuted at the Scala (club) in December 2006. This global orchestra, featuring instruments and musicians from all over the world, took part in the South Bank's Overture programme in June 2007, celebrating the re-opening of the Royal Festival Hall. In November 2009 the orchestra celebrated The Stables 40th anniversary with a concert opened by young musicians who had taken part in workshops held the month before.

Mantra – a collaboration with the Orlando Consort, Jonathan Mayer (sitar) and Shahid Khan (vocals), which toured the UK. An album Mantra was produced along with a set of learning resources for the National Centre for Early Music.

From Hollywood to Bollywood with conductor Robert Ziegler and the BBC Concert Orchestra for Radio 2's Friday Night is Music Night. The show was broadcast twice in 2010.

=== TV and film soundtracks ===
==== As producer and composer ====
- A Nice Arrangement (1991)
- Bhaji on the Beach (1993)
- Bend It Like Beckham (2003)
- Winter of Love – (2001)
- Burger King – TV Commercial (2003)
- Halifax Building Society – TV Commercial (2004)
- Who Do You Think You Are? – BBC Television (2005)
- The Night Listener (2006)
- Boogie Beebies – Children's Songs for CBBC Television (2008)

==== As performer ====
- A Little Princess (1995)
- Wings of A Dove (1997)
- Madhur Jaffrey's BBC Christmas Special
- The Four Feathers (2002)
- Love & Hate (2002)
- The Guru (2003)
- Halifax Building Society – TV commercial (2003)
- Bend It Like Beckham (2004)
- Bond (strings) – pop video (2005)
- After The Wedding (2006)
- Space Pirates – CBBC (2009)

=== Theatre and musicals ===
==== As composer ====
- A Song for a Sanctuary – Kali Theatre Company (1991)
- Cloud Watching – Half Moon Young People's Theatre (1998)
- The Ramayana – Birmingham Repertory Theatre (2000)
- The Ramayana – The National Theatre (2001)
- Mapping The Edge – The Crucuble Theatre Sheffield (2001)
- Layla Majnun – Midlands Art Centre Birmingham (2003)
- The Deranged Marriage – National Tour (2004–2006)
- The Far Pavilions – The Shaftsbury Theatre (2005)
- The Twelfth Night – Aubrey Theatre (2005)
- Lion of Punjab – Punjabi Theatre Academy (2006)
- The Snow Queen – Pantomime Theatre Royal Stratford East (2006)
- King Cotton – Manchester Lowry & Liverpool Empire (2007)

==== As performer ====
- The Ramayana – Birmingham Repertory Theatre (2000)& The National Theatre (2001)
- Bombay Dreams – Apollo Victoria Theatre (2002 to 2004)
- The Far Pavilions – The Shaftsbury Theatre (2005)
- Lion of Punjab – Punjabi Theatre Academy (2006)
- King Cotton – Manchester Lowry & Liverpool Empire (2007)

== Awards ==
- 1986: Best Musical Director – Asian Pop Awards
- 1987: Best Musical Director – Asian Pop Awards
- 1989: Top Musical director – The Mrs Kaur Trophy
- 1992: Nomination for Men of Achievement award
- 1993: Most Consistent & Prolific Producer – The Music Industry Accolade UK
- 2001: Outstanding Contribution to the Music Industry – Matra Annual Award
- 2002: Ramgharia Sabha Appreciation Award
- 2007: Outstanding Contribution to Bhangra – Sikh Media Award
- 2009: Best Pioneer Music Producer – The UK Bhangra Music Awards
- 2009: MBE – For Services to Bhangra and British Asian Music
- 2010: Honorary Doctorate of Music DMus – Exeter University
