= Silinder Pardesi =

- Also known as: Silinder Pardesi, The Pardesi Music Machine, Pump Up The Bhangra
- Born: Silinder Singh Bhogal
- Origin: Coventry, England
- Genres: Bhangra, Hindi, Indi-pop
- Occupation: Singer
- Years active: 1982–present
- Labels: Oriental Star Agencies; Hi-Tech Music (UK): Tips Music (India)
- Website: pardesi.co.uk

Silinder Pardesi is a Bhangra singer-songwriter, lyricist, and composer from Coventry, West Midlands, England. He is the founder and lead singer of the British Asian Bhangra band 'The Pardesi Music Machine'. In 1994 Silinder Pardesi left the band and began his solo career. Over the past 30 years Silinder Pardesi has released over twenty albums and collaborated with an array of artists including Rishi Rich and Neeru Bajwa.

Silinder Pardesi is a graduate from Aston University, Birmingham, England, and holds a bachelor's degree with honours in Electrical and Electronic Engineering.

== The Pardesi Music Machine ==
Silinder Pardesi started his singing career at a young age, with encouragement from his family and friends. Singing in Sikh temples and being influenced by his idol Mohammed Rafi, he gained confidence and widened his singing and musical knowledge.

The Pardesi Music Machine was formed by Silinder Pardesi during the early 1980s. The sound of Pardesi has led them to perform at several Asian weddings, mela's, and world music festivals. The Pardesi Music Machine has performed a fusion of Punjabi and Hindi music with other musical influences such as reggae, dance, RnB, and rock.

In 1986 the Pardesi Music Machine claimed the Asian Song Contest Award which secured them a recording contract with Oriental Star Agencies. This encouraged them to record and release their first religious album with all proceeds being donated to charity. Soon after they recorded their first Bhangra album 'Nashay Diye Band Botlay'. 1988 saw the release of 'Pump Up the Bhangra', which sold over 25,000 copies.

‘Pump up the Bhangra' was the first album to use samplers, sequences and remixing. The album captured the imagination of the Asian youth with westernised beats and traditional eastern melodies. The album is still regarded as one of the most innovative and pioneering albums to date reaching number 1 chart status across Europe, Canada and the US. Its successor album 'Shake Yer Pants' was released by Oriental Star Agencies in 1990 and sold over 30,000 copies. Both albums received Gold Disc awards at the annual UK Asian Pop and Media Awards.

1990 saw the Pardesi Music Machine perform live on the eve of the football World Cup final in Italy. The Pardesi Music machine have performed at world music festivals in Canada, US, France, Belgium, Germany, Sweden, Switzerland and the Netherlands where they have featured alongside leading pop acts such as Womack & Womack, Neneh Cherry, Carlos Santana, Stevie Wonder and many others.

The Pardesi Music Machine was the first Bhangra band to perform at the Glastonbury music festival in 1994 alongside acts including Blur, Björk, and Oasis. 1994 saw the band play alongside the Nusrat Fateh Ali Khan at the Edinburgh music festival.

== Career ==
In 1994 Silinder Pardesi left the band and pursued his solo career. Since starting his solo career, Silinder Pardesi has released seventeen solo albums and one greatest hits album. In addition to recording solo Bhangra albums, Silinder Pardesi recorded the albums Bollywood Seduction 1 and Bollywood Seduction 2 as tribute albums for his childhood musical idol Mohammed Rafi. In 1995 Silinder Pardesi received a Gold Disc award at the UK Asian Pop and Dance Awards, Birmingham, England in recognition of sales for the album Bollywood Seduction 1. Following the success of the Bollywood Seduction series, in 2006 Silinder Pardesi performed with The City of Birmingham Symphony Orchestra (CBSO) 60-piece orchestra in 'A Tribute to Mohammed Rafi' concert at the Symphony Hall, Birmingham, West Midlands, England.

Silinder Pardesi's solo albums have included music production and collaborations with many artists including Sukshinder Shinda, Kam Frantic, Dr Zeus, and Tarli Digital.

Silinder Pardesi has performed around the world and enjoyed the excitement of playing to crowds of various nationalities and races around the world. On 9 September 1997, the city of Moscow celebrated its 850th anniversary in the Red Square with an estimated audience of 500,000 people. Silinder Pardesi represented Asian music with a live performance alongside other artists such as Luciano Pavarotti.

Music from Silinder Pardesi's albums has aired on a number of UK Radio Stations including the BBC Asian Network, and Television broadcasts including: 'The Clothes Show', 'Motormouth', 'DEF II' and was used as the title music to BBC's 'Ipso Facto'. Together with his live band Silinder Pardesi has recorded live sessions for BBC's "Network East" and "What's that Noise". Silinder Pardesi's album covers have also been featured in many films including the British comedy 'Bend It Like Beckham', directed by Gurinder Chadha and starred Keira Knightley.

In 2006 Silinder Pardesi joined one of India's top Bollywood record companies Tips Music (India) to produce his future albums and videos. The album 'Hey Soniye' had its first video single feature the world famous Bollywood actress Neeru Bajwa, Rishi Rich, Juggy D and Veronica Mehta. The album's title tracks 'Hey Soniye' and 'Mahi Vey' were produced by Rishi Rich.

In December 2011 after two years in the making, Silinder Pardesi released a Sikh religious Shabad Gurbani album entitled 'Ek Onkar' (God is One).

== Awards and recognition ==
1986 – Asian Song Contest Award (Oriental Star Agencies)

1989 – Pump Up The Bhangra – Best Album, Gold Disc for Outstanding Sales, and Best Band Awards (UK Asian Pop and Media Awards)

1991 – The Pardesi Music Machine – Best Band (UK Asian Pop and Media Awards)

1992 – Shake Yer Pants – Best Album, Gold Disc for Outstanding Sales, and Best Single -Balbeero Bhabi (UK Asian Pop and Media Awards)

1995 – Bollywood Seduction – Gold Disc for Outstanding Sales Achievement (UK Asian Pop and Dance Awards)

1999 – Achievement in Asian Music Award (Awarded by the High Commissioner for India in the UK, Mr Lalit Mann)

2009 – Punjabi Cultural Award – Contribution to the promotion of Punjabi culture in Britain through music (The Punjabis in Britain All Parliamentary Group, Westminster, London)

== Discography ==
Release	Album	Record label
2010	Akhiyan	Hi-Tech Music
2008	Hey Soniye	Hi-Tech Music/Tips Music (India)
2003	Firing on All Silinders	Hi-Tech Music
2001	Destiny	Hi-Tech Music
1999	Memories	Oriental Star Agencies
1998	Exposure	Oriental Star Agencies
1997	Bollywood Seduction 2	Roma Music Bank
1996	Pump'n Up Again	Roma Music Bank
1996	King of Kings	Roma Music Bank
1995	Death Jamm 3	Roma Music Bank
1995	On a Dance Trip	Roma Music Bank
1995	Bollywood Seduction	Roma Music Bank
1995	Planet Earth	Roma Music Bank
1995	Spectrum	Roma Music Bank
1995	No to Nasha	Roma Music Bank
1993	Full Badmashi	Pardesi Record Company
1992	Just Badmashi	Pardesi Record Company
1990	Shake Yer Pants	Oriental Star Agencies
1988	Pump Up The Bhangra	Oriental Star Agencies
1987	Nashay Diye Band Botlay	Oriental Star Agencies

=== Religious ===
Year	Album	Record label
2011	Ek Onkar	Hi-Tech Music
1994	Mitter Pyare Noo	Roma Music Bank
1986	Shabad Gurbani and Geet Guran De	Oriental Star Agencies
