= Alan Friedman (disambiguation) =

Alan Friedman (born 1956) is an American journalist, author and former media and public relations executive.

Alan Friedman may also refer to:

- Alan Warren Friedman, professor of English and comparative literature
- Alan H. Friedman (1928–2019), novelist, short story writer, and literary critic
- Alan J. Friedman (1943–2014), physicist
- Josh Alan Friedman (1956-), musician, writer

== See also ==
- Alan E. Freedman (1889–1980), pioneer and executive in the motion picture film processing industry
- Allan Friedman (born 1949), professor of neurosurgery
