= Chirag Pehchan =

UK Bhangra band

Chirag Pehchan was a 1980s Bhangra band in the UK, formed by Amarjit Sidhu and Mangal Singh by merging the two Punjabi bhangra groups Chirag and Pehchan, best remembered for the 1987 classic album Rail Gaddi, composed by Kuljit Bhamra. Their song Rail Gaddi was sung by Mangal Singh and became a popular party piece at the end of Indian weddings, synonymous with Do The Conga, where wedding guests form lines, pretending to be a train, dancing around the wedding hall.

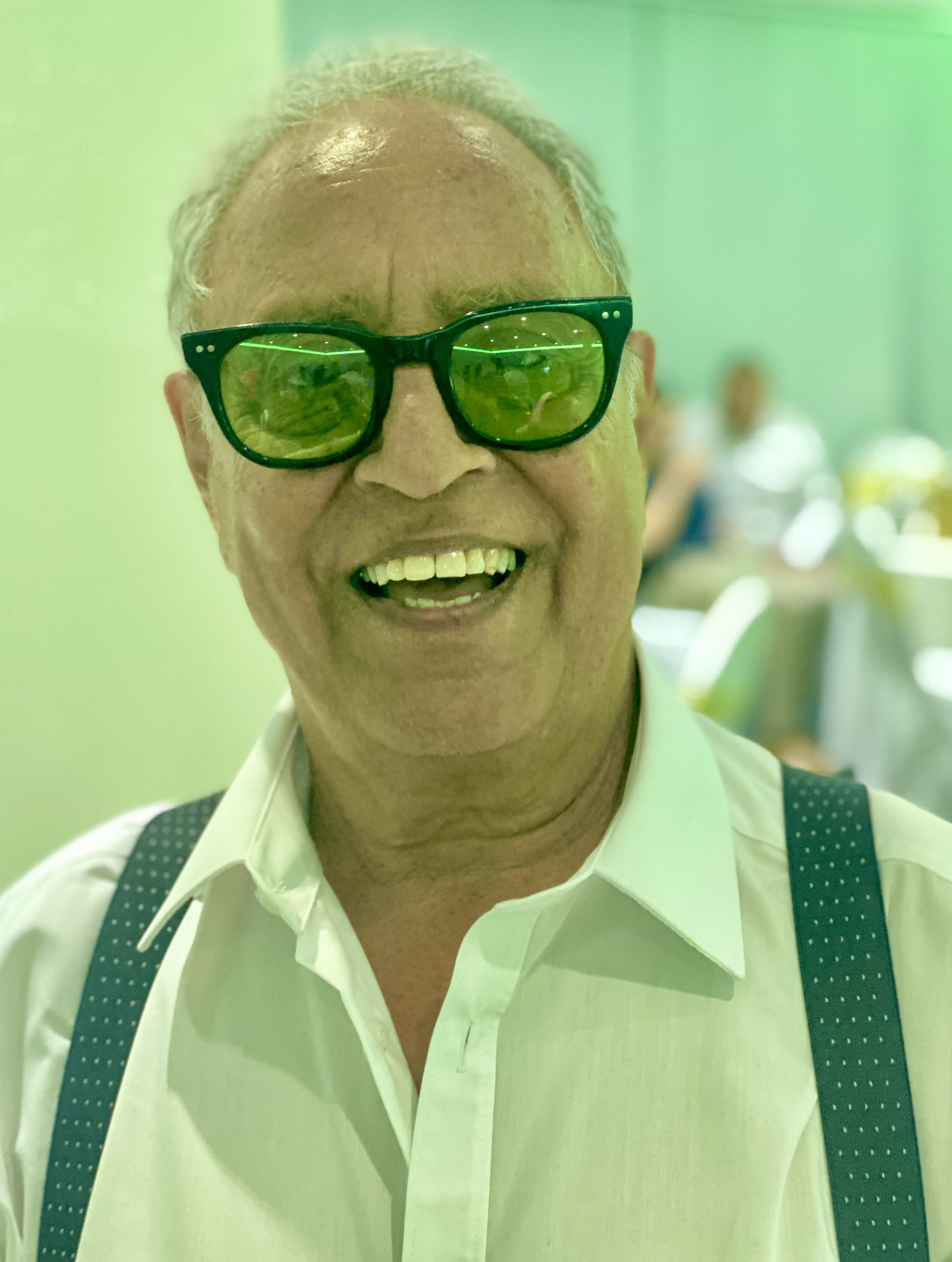
Mangal Singh (2022)
