= Punjabi by Nature =

- Origin: Toronto, Ontario, Canada
- Genres: Bhangra
- Years active: 1993–2000
- Labels: Westpark
- Past members: Raffa Dean; Paul Dhanjal; Chris Hess; Tony Singh; Tesfa Campbell; Jason Filiatrault; Shameema Soni; Ivana Santilli

Punjabi by Nature was a seven piece bhangra band founded in Toronto in 1993. They were nominated for a Juno Award for Best Global Album at the Juno Awards of 1996, for their album Jmpn For Joy.

Punjabi by Nature were unique in the bhangra genre in that they were emphatic that their music was not targeted exclusively toward ethnic Indo-Canadians, but people of all nationalities and ethnic groups. They blended traditional bhangra with hip hop, reggae and dance elements, featuring both Punjabi language lyrics sung by lead singer Tony Singh and English lyrics sung or rapped by the supporting musicians.

Singh recorded the demo cassette Goonda Gardi in 1993 before putting together a full band to record Jmpn for Joy. Other band members included Raffa Dean, Paul Dhanjal, Chris Hess, Tesfa Campbell, Jason Filiatrault, Shameema Soni and Ivana Santilli, with Singh noting that he chose his collaborators based on what they could play rather than their race or skin colour. They performed as a backing band for Lillian Allen at the 1994 Kumbaya Festival.

Jmpn for Joy received widespread airplay on Canadian radio and MuchMusic, particularly for their bhangrified cover of KC and the Sunshine Band's "That's the Way (I Like It)".

They followed up with the album Raise the Roof in 1999, although by this time they were perceived as having missed the wave of interest in Indian music sparked by Cornershop's 1997 hit "Brimful of Asha", and the album did not meet with the same success as Jmpn for Joy.

They subsequently broke up, although they briefly reunited in 2011 to perform at a special event celebrating the premiere of Breakaway, a comedy film about an Indo-Canadian hockey player.

== Discography ==
- Goonda Gardi - 1993
- Jmpn for Joy - 1995
- Raise the Roof - 1999

== See also ==
- List of bhangra bands
