= Sahotas =

- Also known as: Kings of Bhangra
- Origin: UK
- Genres: Bhangra, fusion
- Occupation: Band
- Years active: 1987–present
- Labels: Internalmusic, IRS Records, Multitone records, Rough Trade Records
- Website: http://www.transum.org/Sahotas/ http://www.internalmusic.co.uk

Sahotas were a U.K. based Bhangra/Rock/World music band. The band, started in Bilston, Wolverhampton in the mid-1980s, had a line-up of five brothers. They have released music in both English and Punjabi. The lead singer was Surj Sahota, and the music director/producer was Mukhtar Sahota.

The band's music is very different from conventional Punjabi music, combining the Bhangra genre with pop, house, reggae and rock, focusing on vocal styles and sounds. This transfusion occurred during the apex of Bhangra Music in the 1980s and 1990s when there was an abundance of Live British Asian Music across the United Kingdom; and when British Asian Music sought to be recognised by the mainstream music industry. The Sahotas were at the forefront of seeking this recognition, performing live on Cilla Black's Surprise, Surprise, Blue Peter, 8:15 from Manchester and Eggs 'n' Baker. The Sahotas also joined Apache Indian on Carton TV's Soul Music and performed the soulful spiritual song "Urdaas" (Prayer).

The band were signed by Miles Copeland III's EMI Records, who at the time was Sting's Manager. The single "Out of Reach" and the album Right Time reached the UK Top 100, the first for a British Asian artist. This was closely followed by a nationwide tour with reggae band Aswad.

Sahotas toured in Africa, India, Pakistan, the US, Canada and Europe. Their hit songs include "Sahota Show Te Jake", "Hass Hogia", "Mahi Di Udeek", "Gal Bangaee", "Akhian Samaal", "Dang Ditha", "Sach", "Ajaa Ajaa Ajaa", "Dil Wich Tu Vasdi" and "Heerie".

The Sahotas' accolades include 'Best Band', 'Best Live Band' and 'Band of the Millennium' in the UK Bhangra Music industry. They were awarded platinum and gold discs for album sales.

The band's last release was their 7th bhangra album, Revolution in 2001; this album was a compilation of old hits released purely for the Indian and Pakistani music market.

Subsequently, the music producer from the band Mukhtar Sahota released a number of solo albums. Surj Sahota has worked with the band B21, Swedish Reggae band Urban Tribe, and Basil Gabbidon, the founder of Steel Pulse.

== Discography ==
Albums

Year	Title	Record label
1987	Giddha Pao	Multitone Records
1988	Sahota Beat	Multitone Records
1989	Aaja	Multitone Records
1991	Ishk	Multitone Records
1995	The Right Time	IRS Records/EMI
1997	Decade	Kamlee Records
1999	Brotherhood; Teri Meri Gal Ban Gayee	Envy; Times Music (India)
2001	Revolution; Dil Vich Tu Vasdi	Envy; Tips Music (India)

Extended plays

Year	Title	Record label
1990	Are You Feeling	Rough Trade
1995	Suniye	Roma Music

Singles

Year	Title	Record label
1993	"Hass Hogia"	IRS Records
1994	"Out of Reach"	IRS Records/EMI
1998	"Maa da Pyar"	Kamlee Records
2014	"Holi Holi"	Moviebox Records
2014	"Tu Mil Gayi"	Moviebox Records

== See also ==
- Bhangra (music)
- List of Bhangra Bands
- Multitone Records
- IRS Records
- Rough Trade Records
- Tips Music
