= Bir Pind =

- Village
- Location in Punjab, India Bir Pind (India)
- Coordinates: 31.109°N 75.519°E
- Country: India
- State: Punjab
- District: Jalandhar

Government
  - Body: Congress

Languages
  - Official: Punjabi
- Time zone: UTC+5:30 (IST)
- PIN: 144043
- Telephone code: 1821

Bir Pind is a village in Nakodar. Nakodar is a tehsil in the city Jalandhar of Indian state of Punjab.

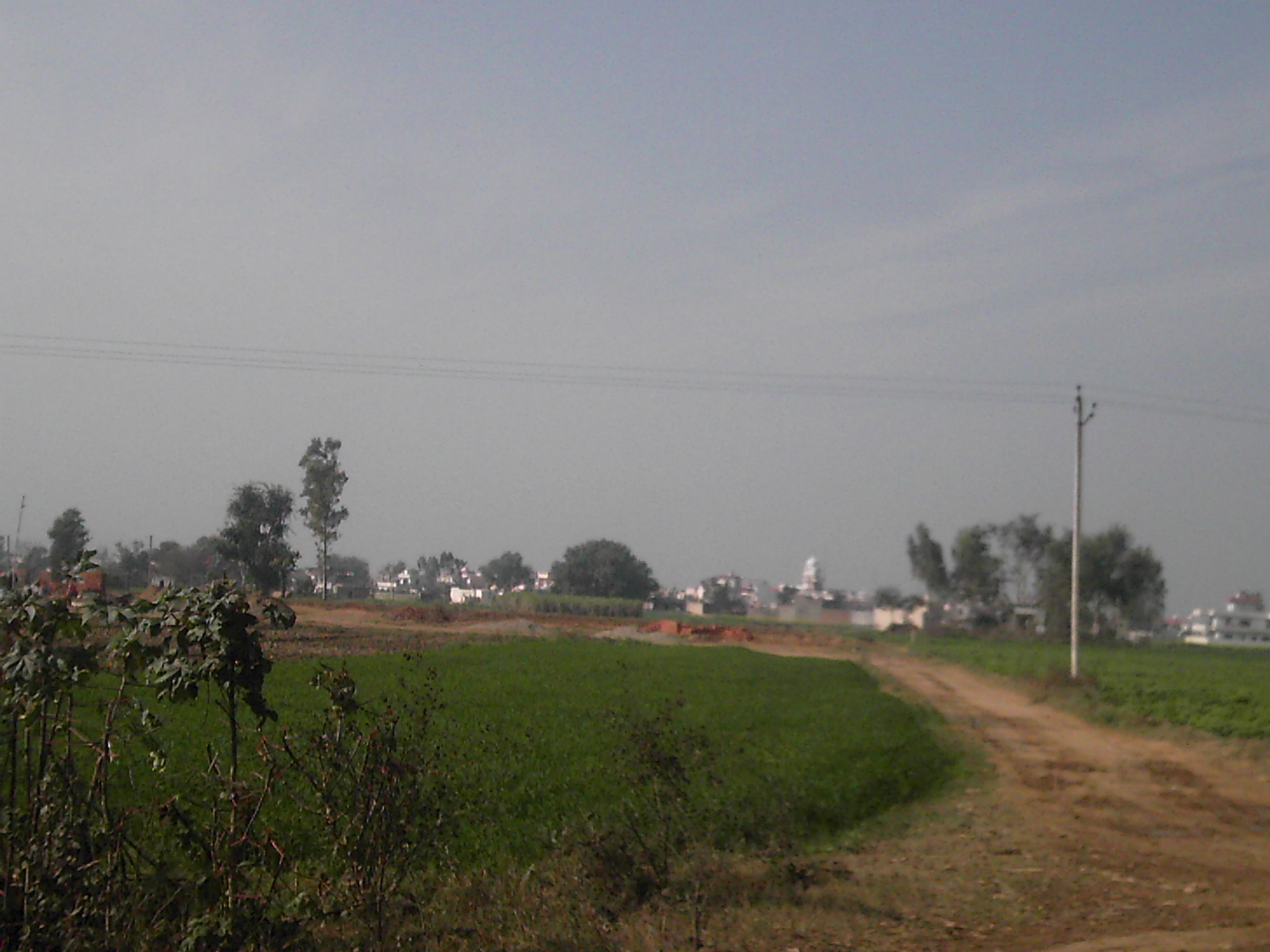
A view of Bir Pind

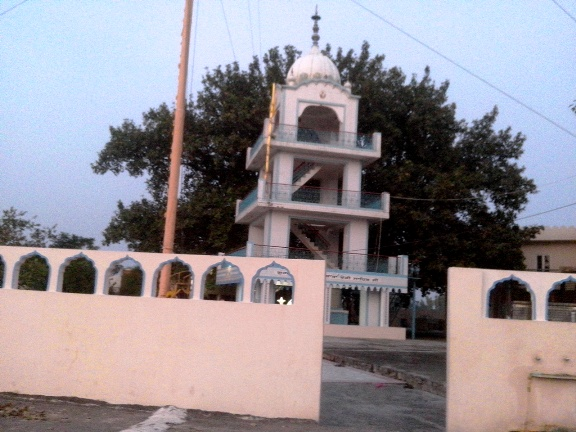
Gurduwara at Bir Pind's entrance

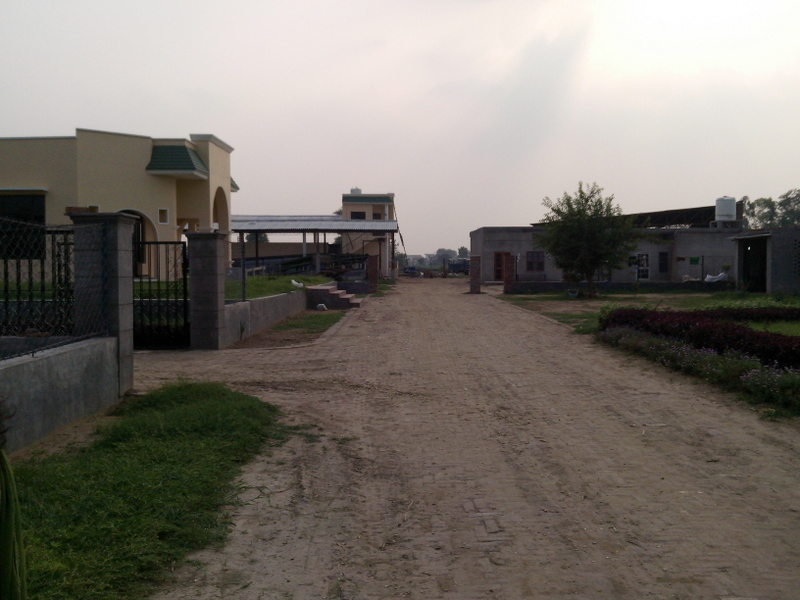
Bir Pind Dairy Farm

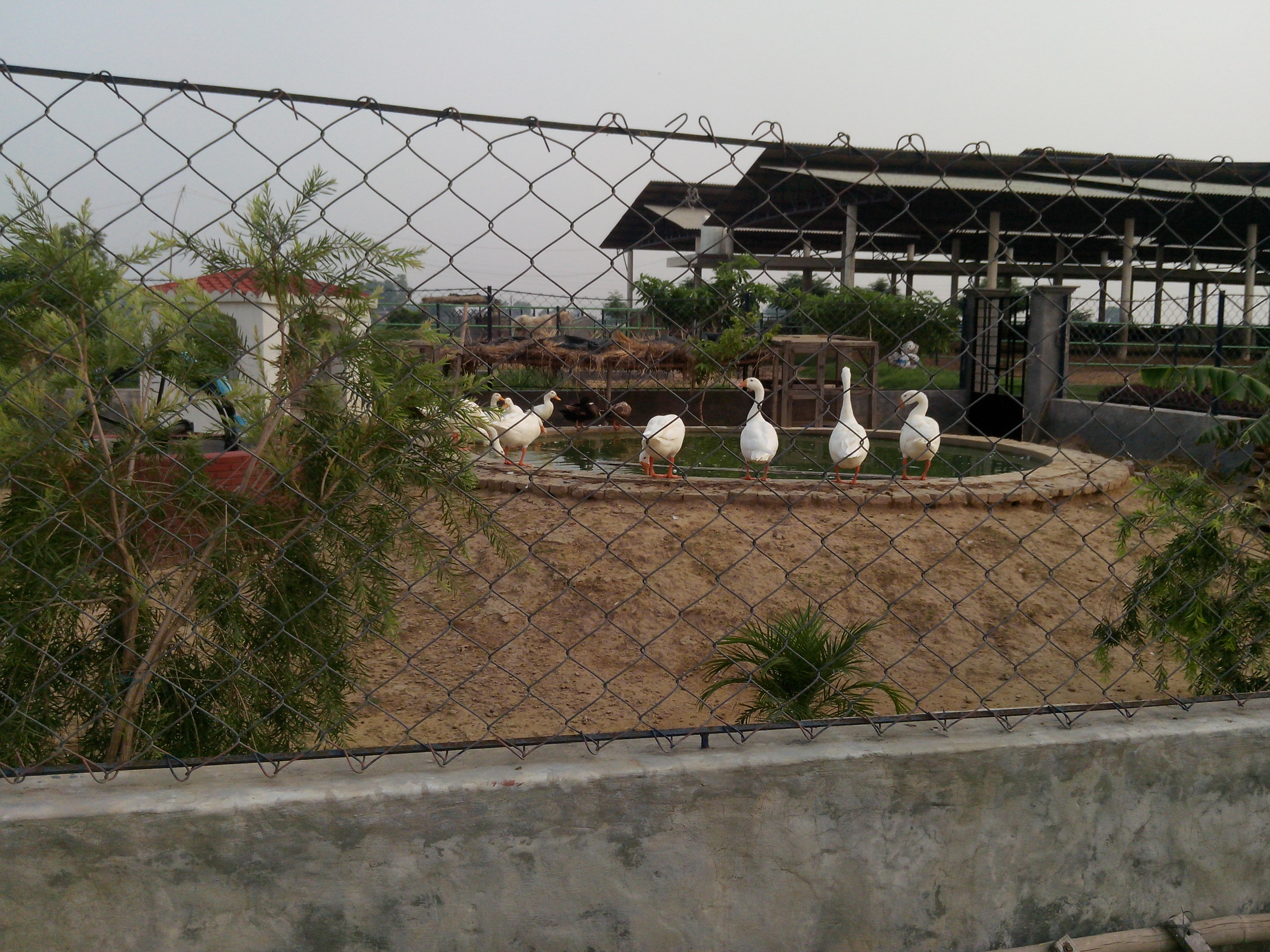
A view of Bir Pind Dairy Farm

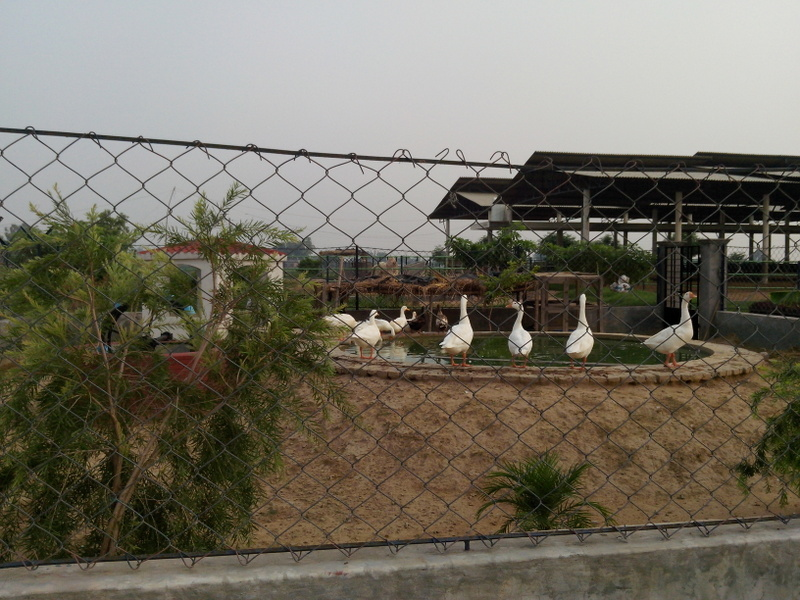
Dairy Farm in Bir Pind, Punjab

== About Bir Pind ==
Bir Pind is approximately 425 kilometers from New Delhi and almost 120 kilometers from Amritsar. Nawa Pind Shonkia Da is the neighbouring village of Bir Pind. A project to build a Primary school, Secondary school and a Plus 2 School started in April 2008 and is completed in Spring 2011.
