= Ucha Dar Babe Nanak Da =

Indian film

- Film poster
- Directed by: Tarnvir Singh Jagpal
- Written by: Tarnvir Singh Jagpal
- Produced by: Tarnvir Singh Jagpal
- Starring: Dev Kharoud; Monica Gill; Isha Rikhi; Harby Sangha; Yograj Singh; Sarbjit Cheema; Kimi Verma
- Cinematography: Runal Hattimattur
- Edited by: Gagan Sachdeva
- Music by: Harj Nagra, Jaskirat Singh
- Production company: Tarn Jagpal Films Ltd
- Distributed by: Ryhtm Boys Entertainment Ltd
- Release date: 12 July 2024
- Running time: 118 minutes
- Country: India
- Language: Punjabi

Ucha Dar Babe Nanak Da is a 2024 Indian Punjab film directed and produced by Tarnvir Singh Jagpal. It stars Dev Kharoud, Monica Gill, Isha Rikhi, Harby Sangha, Yograj Singh, Sarbjit Cheema and Kimi Verma. It was released on 12 July 2024.

== Plot ==
Dev Kharoud and Monica Gill feature in Ucha Dar Babe Nanak Da, a family drama. As husband and wife in the film, Dev and Monica, have a lot of arguments due to their dissimilar personalities, which leads to their break-up. But Dev's father, Yograj Singh, teaches him to read the Gurbani words, and that brings an end to all his suffering and guides him on the path of righteousness. Dev obeys his father and worships him every day.

== Cast ==
- Dev Kharoud
- Monica Gill
- Harby Sangha
- Yograj Singh
- Sarbjit Cheema
- Isha Rikhi
- Kimi Verma
- Kamaljit Neeru
- Harj Nagra
- Naginder Gakhar
- Baljinder Singh Atwal
- Lakhan Pal
- Gurnaz Kaur
- Japanjot kaur
- Karm Bath
- Naginder Gakhar
- Sarita Tiwari

== Soundtrack ==
Ucha Dar Babe Nanak Da

Soundtrack album by Amrinder Gill, Veet Baljit, Jenny Johal, Baba Gulab Singh Ji, Kamal Khan, Indresh Upadhyay
- Released: 2024
- Genre: Feature film soundtrack
- Label: Tarn Jagpal Films

Track Listing
No.	Title	Artist	Length
1.	"Naam Japo"	Amrinder Gill	00:02:34
2.	"Parmatmaa"	Himanshu Sharma	00:03:05
3.	"Baa Dastoor"	Indresh Upadhayay, Veet Baljit, Magic, Fateh	00:02:45
4.	"Bani Teri"	Kamal Khan	00:02:49
5.	"Rooh"	Jenny Johal	00:02:33
6.	"Ucha Dar Babe Nanak Da (title track)"	Baba Gulab Singh Ji, Harby Sangha	00:02:27
7.	"Magnet"	Veet Baljit	00:02:00
