= Party piece =

Entertainment at a gathering

"Christabel", 1797–1800
Samuel Taylor Coleridge's party piece

In British and Irish culture, a party piece is something done at a gathering in order to entertain the company such as the recitation of a poem, performing a dance, singing a song, performing a trick, or giving a display of memory or strength. It is usually the speciality of the performer. The practice relates to the tradition of oral storytelling and has been described as reaching a peak in the Victorian era before the development of broadcast entertainment.

== Origins and function ==
The party piece relates to the tradition of oral storytelling but has literary connections. Berners Jackson writes that the party piece had a "long and honourable career in the English-speaking world rising to its height, perhaps, under [Queen] Victoria". Adding that there are many instances in the diary of Samuel Pepys and even speculating that William Shakespeare had a party piece that he performed for the entertainment of his fellows when he was a boy.

Alan Warren Friedman has defined the party piece as follows:

"Party pieces" are a peculiar kind of public self-representation. Neither formal recitals within a prepared program nor wholly spontaneous (like bursting into a drunken song), "party pieces" are something in between. Performed at festive gatherings to entertain the assembled group temporarily configuring itself as an audience, they are intended to create an atmosphere of conviviality, fulfill social expectations or requirements, and express or repay hospitality within a reciprocal economy in which host and guest may perform welcoming and after-dinner speeches. To perform willingly, or after minimal persuasion, is a sign of generosity; refusal may be deemed churlish.

The need to perform a party piece may occur at a seasonal holiday such as Christmas or New Year when family and friends are gathered and there is an expectation that everyone will contribute what they can to the entertainment. In December 1949, The Times wrote of the burden felt by children obliged to learn something by heart or of the adult who felt that he or she had little to offer, not being able to perform a card trick, bend a poker in half, or tear a telephone directory in two.

In 2019, Rob Rawson wrote that although sometimes considered outdated, party pieces may provide opportunities for hidden talents to be revealed.

== Examples ==
In 1717, the actor and playwright Colley Cibber wrote The Nonjuror as a party piece for King George II who paid Cibber £2,000 and appointed him poet laureate as a result.

The poet Samuel Taylor Coleridge's party piece was the recitation of his poem "Christabel" which he performed for others many times before it was published in 1816.

In the twentieth-century, the novelist D. H. Lawrence was said to recite the poetry of Swinburne as his party piece. Alan Friedman has described the special place of the party piece in Irish literary culture in his book that explored their role in the output of James Joyce and Samuel Beckett.

In 2004, the Scottish broadcaster Sally Magnusson described a traditional Hogmanay in her family at which party pieces were performed that included the songs of Flanders and Swann, a rendition of the folk song "Sisters", an Australian medley by visitors from that country, and "an actor friend doing his Hamlet-in-three-minutes monologue".

British school teacher Raymond Butt was said to be able to recite pi to 3,500 places and to have once memorised the entire British railway timetable.

The term has also been used to describe techniques in demonstrating mathematics, and even the ability to wiggle one's ears.

== Wider usage ==
The term is sometimes used to describe a virtuoso performance by someone in the normal course of their profession such as solos by the members of the rock group Cream, who have been described as each having one party piece during a concert: Jack Bruce with a harmonica solo, Ginger Baker with a drum solo and Eric Clapton with a vocal and guitar solo; and, in sport, the elimination race as ridden by the cyclist Laura Trott, which has been described as a "dramatic high speed event which has become her party piece".

== See also ==
- Oral tradition
