= Jandwa =

Village in Rajasthan, India

Jandwa is a village in Ratangarh tehsil in Churu district in Rajasthan, India. It is situated 25 km (16 mi) from Churu in the west direction. The village was founded about 450 years ago by Jandu (Janu (clan)) Jats, who moved elsewhere and Khichar Jats settled in Jandwa. Khichar Jats came to Jandwa from Sidhmukh.

Many of the village's young people serve in the defence forces; many work as doctors, engineers, teachers and businessmen.

== Jat gotras ==
The population of the village Jandwa is about 500 families; out of them Khichar is the only Jat gotra with a population of 250 families. There is only one other Jat family of Ruhil.
