= Sidhwan =

Sidhwan Sidhwan
- Village
- Location in Punjab, India Sidhwan (India)
- Coordinates: 31.092558°N 75.519193°E
- Country: India
- State: Punjab
- District: Jalandhar
- Talukas: Nakodar

Languages
  - Official: Punjabi
  - Regional: Punjabi
- Time zone: UTC+5:30 (IST)
- PIN: 144044
- Telephone code: 01821
- Nearest city: Nakodar

Sidhwan is a village in Nakodar, a tehsil in the city Jalandhar of Indian state of Punjab.

== Geography ==
Sidhwan is connected by railways through the railway station Sidhwan. Sidhwan is approximately 425 kilometers from New Delhi and almost 120 kilometers from Amritsar. Nawa Pind Shonkia Da is the neighbouring village of Sidhwan.

A way marker marking the limits of the village

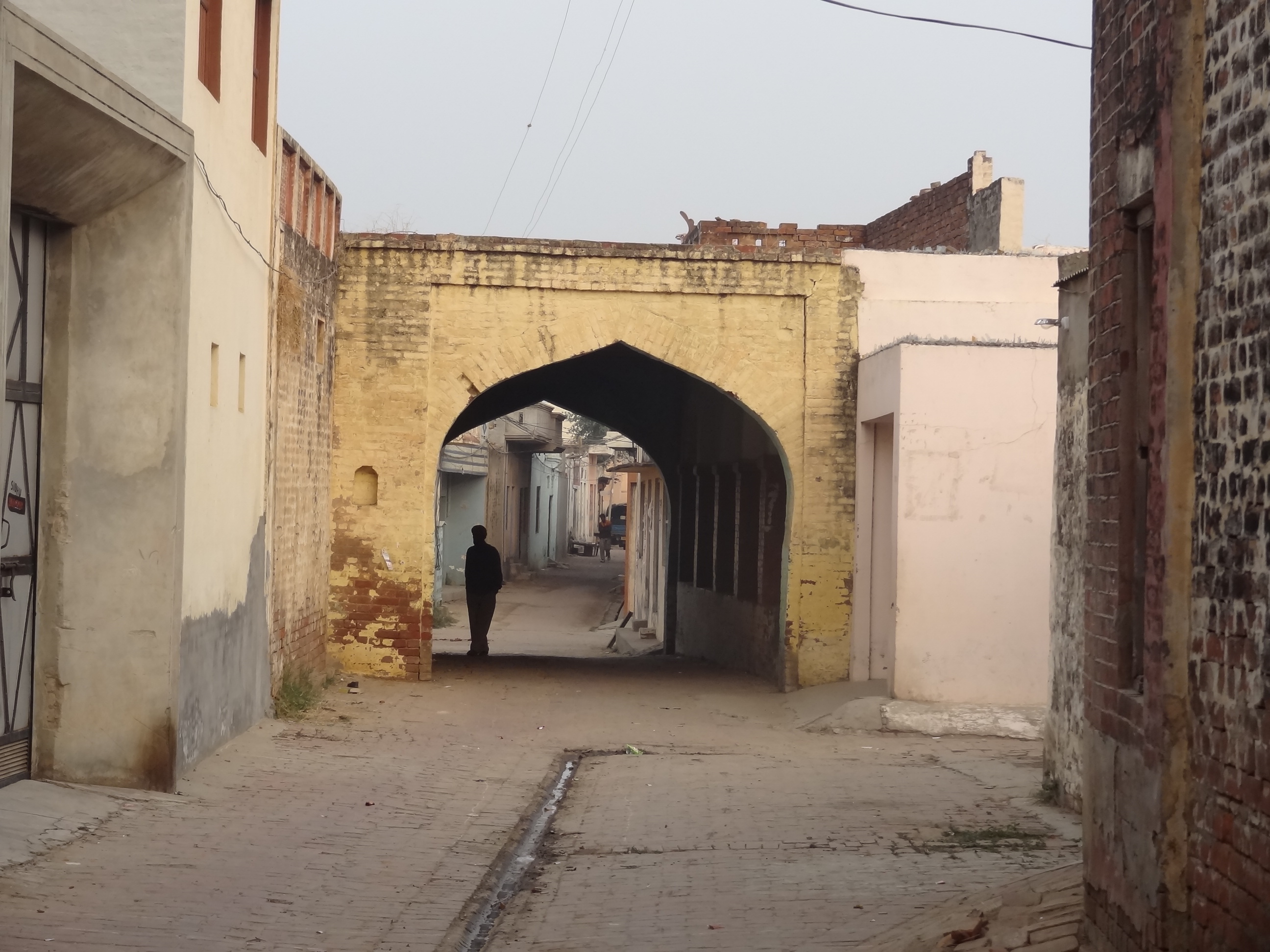
A view of a Sidhwan alley

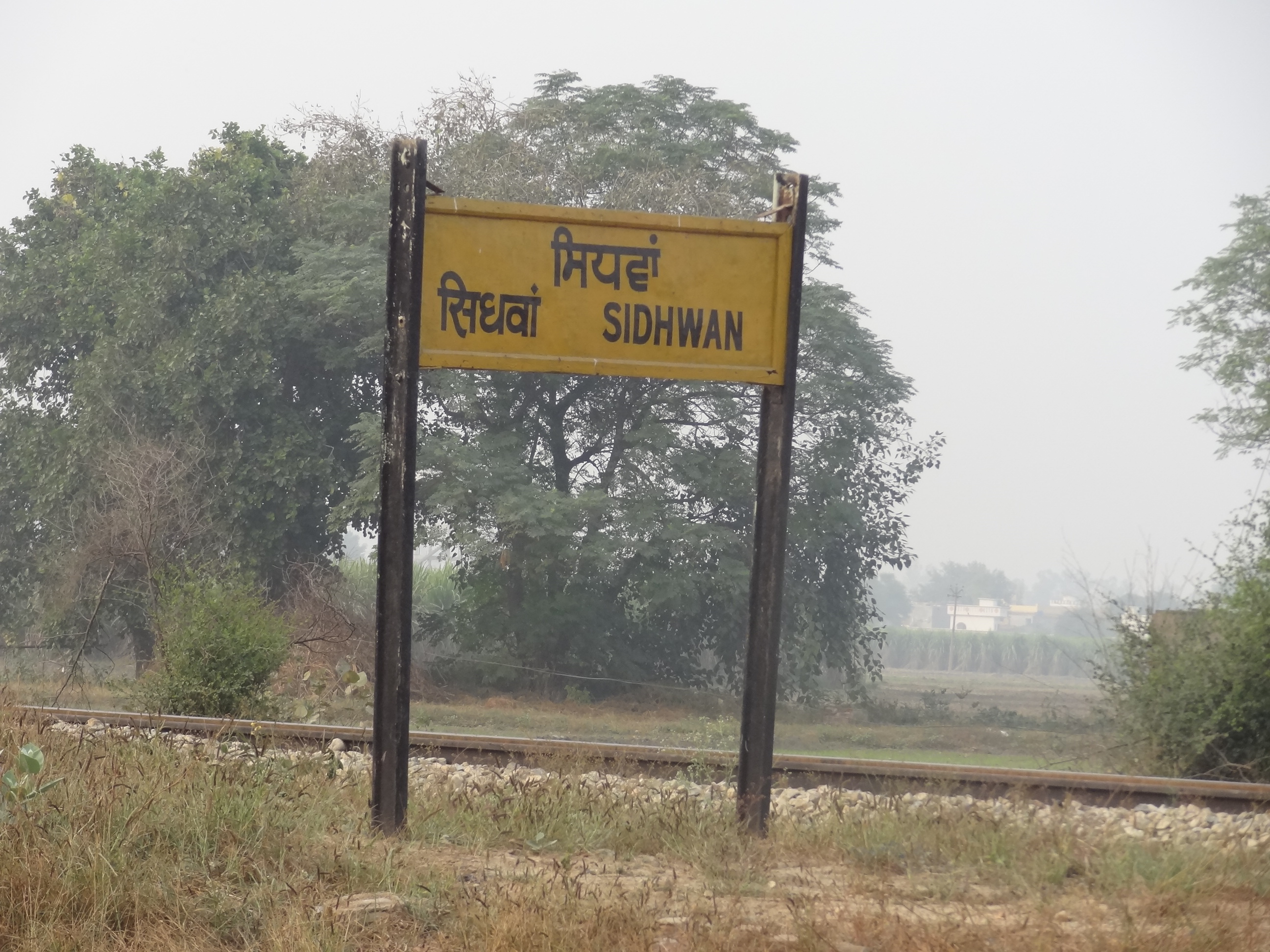
Sidhwan Railway Station

== Addhi Khuyi ==
Addhi Khuyi (Addhi meaning "half" and Khuyi meaning a "well" ) is a place which lies almost in the center of Nakodar and Nurmahal, and is close to Sidhwan. It almost certainly has derived its name from a very old well which is placed nearby.

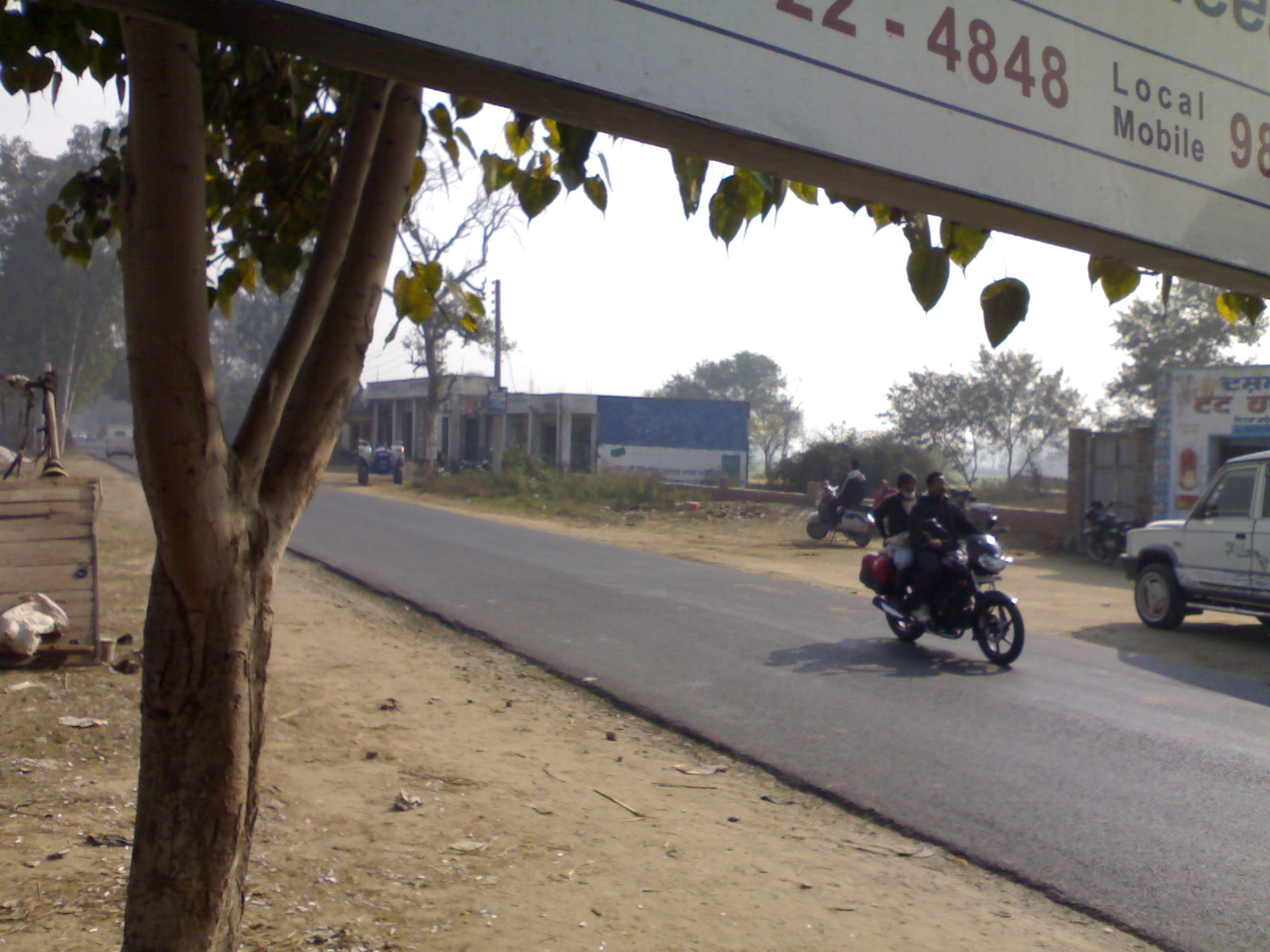
The Entrance of Littran at Addhi Khuyi
