= DCS (band) =

British Asian bhangra band

- Origin: West Midlands, United Kingdom
- Genres: Bhangra
- Years active: 1983-Present
- Labels: Kamlee Records, Multitone Records
- Members: Shin; Juggy; Bhutta
- Past members: Danny Choranji; Charlie
- Website: www.dcs-band.com

DCS are a British Asian Bhangra band, originally formed in 1983 by members Danny Choranji (BBC Asian Network), Charlie, and Shin (who continues to lead the band as vocalist). They are seen as one of the first bands of the UK Bhangra scene along with other bands such as Alaap, Premi, Apna Sangeet, Heera, Shava Shava led by Nirmal Kumar Nirmal and many more.

== Discography ==
- "Teri Shaun" 1985 (Multitone Records)
- "Au Nach Lao" 1986 (EMI)
- "123 Go" 1986 (Mighty M Records)
- "Bhangra's Gonna Get You" 1990 (Multitone Records)
- "DCS O.U.1" 1992 (Multitone Records)
- "Doin It" 1994 (Multitone/BMG)
- "Eat Rhythm" 1995 (Multitone/BMG)
- "Punjabi Dance Nation" 1998 (Kamlee Records)
- "Tenu Kaul Ke" 2003 (Kamlee Records)
- "Desi Culture Shock" 2007 (Kamlee Records)

== Impact on Bhangra ==
In 2005 DCS won "Best Group" at the UK Asian Music Awards. In 2008 Shin was awarded an "Outstanding Achievement" award at the UK Asian Music Awards for his work with DCS. In 2010 DCS won "Best Band" at the Brit Asia TV Music Awards.

== See also ==
- List of bhangra bands
