= Jandu =

Jandu is a Jat and Sikh surname ( in Punjab , Rajasthan and Haryana). The Jandu (or sometimes Jondu for those Jats in western Rajasthan, because of linguistic differences) surname derives from the Sikh warriors confederation (military group) from North India, Punjab. It can also be traced back to Iran with Iranian roots.

They have a majority presence in the UK where they emigrated from India during British era in India and from Kenya.

Jandu Sikh is the community encompassing members of the Jat Sikh clan of Punjab, India.

== Notable people ==
Notable people with the name include:

- Harbans Jandu, Indian composer
- Jandu Hamoud, Kuwaiti cricketer
