= B. A. W. Jackson =

British Shakespeare scholar

Berners A. W. Jackson (3 February 1916 – 9 October 2003) was a British Shakespeare scholar who organised the Shakespeare Seminar at the Stratford Festival between 1961 and 1976. He also edited the Stratford Papers.

== Early life ==
Berners Jackson was born in London, Ontario on 3 February 1916 to Lloyd D. Jackson and Susan Watson. He received his BA from McMaster University in 1939 and his D.Phil. from the University of Oxford in 1956 for a thesis titled "The concept of honour in Elizabethan and early Stuart times".

== Career ==
Jackson taught at the English department of McMaster University between 1956 and 1981. He organised the Shakespeare Seminar of the Stratford Festival (Stratford, Ontario) held from 1961 to 1976 and edited the Stratford Papers on William Shakespeare. He also edited the Pelican edition of The Two Gentlemen of Verona in 1964 and the revised edition in 1980, as well as the Macmillan Canada edition of Antony and Cleopatra published in 1968.

In 2000 he donated a collection of his papers to the archives of McMaster University.

== Selected publications ==
- "Shakespeare at Stratford, Ontario, 1971", Shakespeare Quarterly, Vol. 22 (1971), pp. 369–370.
- Manner and Meaning in Shakespeare. McMaster University Library Press & Irish University Press, 1970. (editor) ISBN 9780716505228
- Shakespeare in the New World. McMaster University Library Press, 1972. (editor) ISBN 9780969027010
