= Oriental Star Agencies =

British based record label

Oriental Star Agencies was a British record label, that was based in Balsall Heath, Birmingham. Some of the artists introduced by the label include Nusrat Fateh Ali Khan, Malkit Singh, Alam Lohar, Amjad Sabri, and Bally Sagoo.

== History ==
In 1969, Muhammad Ayub was approached by members of two local bhangra bands – Bhujhangy Group and Anari Sangeet Party – to record their performances, and the success of the following recordings led him to establish the label.

The label was founded in 1970 by Muhammad Ayub, Abdul Ghani and his son Dr Abdul Mohsin Mian. Muhammad Ayub had previously owned a record store with Abdul Ghani importing Indian and Pakistani music into the United Kingdom. The label was founded in 1970 by Muhammad in Balsall Heath. OSA went onto become a leading influence on the Desi music scene, importing, promoting and producing music from the Indian subcontinent as well as nurturing talent among the young Desi diaspora. It remained at its Balsall Heath site until 2017.

Universal Music Group (UMG) acquired the catalog of OSA in January 2024.
