= Apna Sangeet =

British Asian bhangra band

- Origin: Birmingham, United Kingdom
- Genres: Bhangra
- Years active: 1983 - current
- Members: Kulwant Bhamra, Sandara Gill, Gurcharan Mall, Davinderpal Kalsa, Niki Patel, Arjinder Kang
- Website: https://facebook.com/apna.sangeet.9

Apna Sangeet are a British Asian Bhangra band from Birmingham, England. They are seen as one of the first bands of the UK Bhangra scene along with other bands such as Alaap, Heera, DCS and many more.

The group was formed in 1984 by six Birmingham musicians. Known as pioneers of British Bhangra, with others like Heera Group and Alaap. In contrast to the more western sounds of contemporary groups like DCS, they played a very traditional style of bhangra with a dhol player centre stage. By 1991 they were platinum disc holders, and held the title of UK Asian Pop Award for Best Asian Band.

By 1994, the group had released nine albums and sold more than 2,000,000 records, and were awarded Best Bhangra Band by Movie International Magazine.

The Stage in 1995 described the group as a "superband...who are virtually unknown to non-Asians".

In 2009, the band reunited for one charity show. They also reformed for the 2014 Vaisakhi celebrations in Trafalgar Square, London, together with groups Heera and Premi.

Apna Sangeet released a song in 2021 on the album Hope with Kiss Music.
