= Littran =

- village
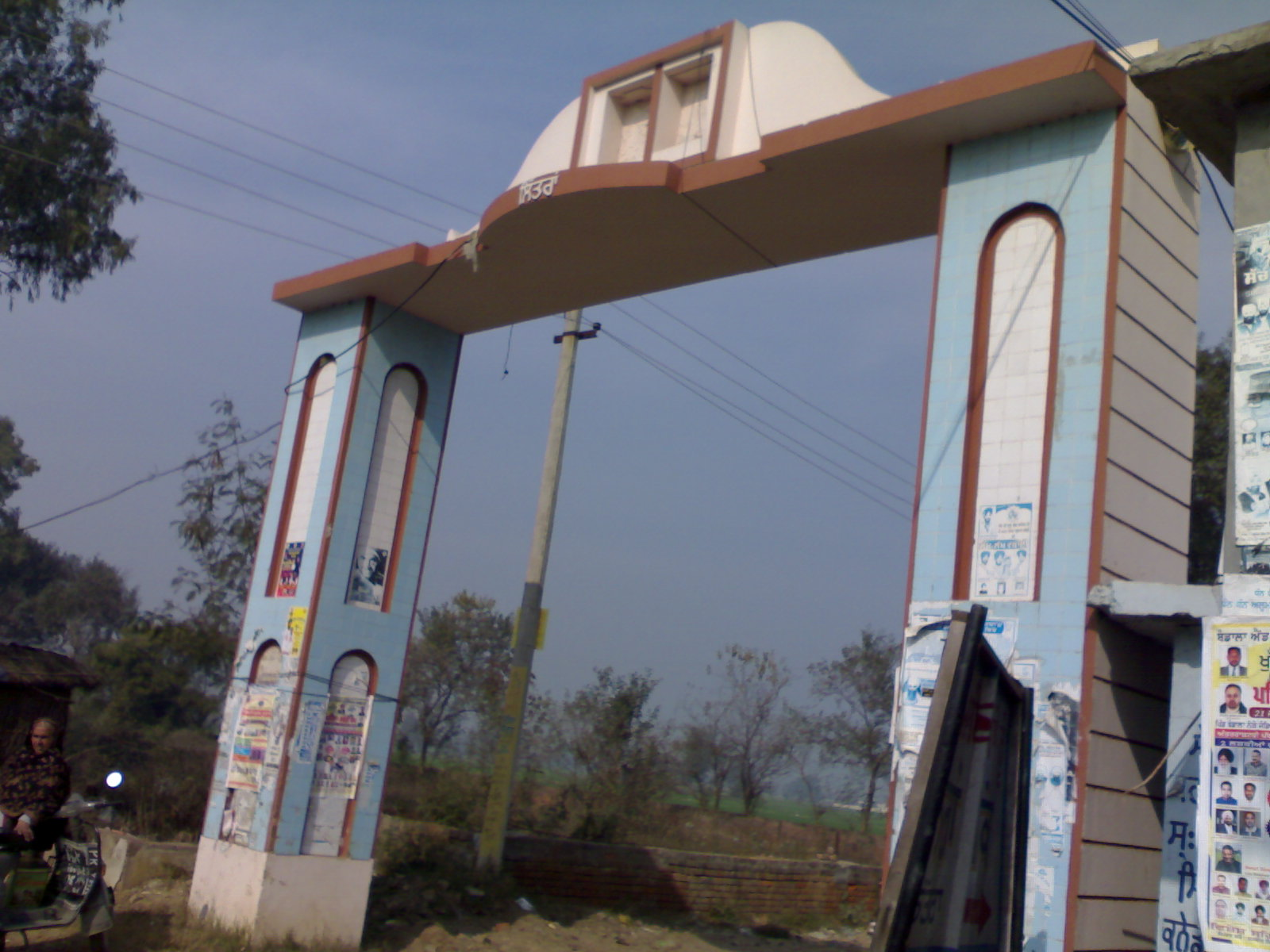
- Entrance to Littran from Addhi Khuyi

- Location in Punjab, India Littran (India)
- Coordinates: 31.124792°N 75.532690°E
- Country: India
- State: Punjab
- District: Jalandhar
- Talukas: Nakodar

Languages
  - Official: Punjabi
  - Regional: Punjabi
- Time zone: UTC+5:30 (IST)
- PIN: 144043
- Telephone code: 0181
- Nearest city: Nakodar

Littran is a village in Nakodar tehsil in the district Jalandhar of Indian state of Punjab.

== Relation to other villages ==
It is connected to Addhi Khuyi which lies in the south of Nakodar and Nurmahal. Littran is almost 425 kilometres from New Delhi and approximately 120 kilometres from Amritsar.

== See also ==
- Harbans Singh Jandu or Jandu Littranwala, Indian musician
