= Janů =

Janů is a Czech surname derived from the given name Jan. Notable people with the surname include:

- Miroslav Janů (1959–2013), Czech footballer
- Petra Janů, Czech singer and actress
- Tomáš Janů (born 1973), Czech footballer
- Zorka Janů (1921–1946), Czech actress
