= Sanghe Khalsa =

- village
- Location in Punjab, India Sanghe Khalsa (India)
- Coordinates: 31.100001°N 75.542250°E
- Country: India
- State: Punjab
- District: Jalandhar
- Talukas: Nurmahal

Languages
  - Official: Punjabi
  - Regional: Punjabi
- Time zone: UTC+5:30 (IST)
- PIN: 144044
- Telephone code: 01821
- Vehicle registration: PB- 08
- Nearest city Nurmhal: Nurmahal

Sanghe Khalsa is a small village in Nurmahal. Nurmahal is a sub-tehsil in the city Jalandhar of Indian state of Punjab.

== STD code ==
Sanghe Khalsa's STD code is 01826
