= Alaap (band) =

British Asian bhangra band

- Origin: Southall, United Kingdom
- Genres: Bhangra
- Years active: 1977-present
- Labels: Multitone
- Members: Channi Singh

Alaap are a British Asian Bhangra band credited as one of the first bands of the UK Bhangra scene, along with other bands such as Apna Sangeet, Heera and DCS. The BBC have described the group as the 'most prolific' bhangra band.

== History ==
The band formed in Southall, West London, in 1977. Originally a traditional bhangra band, they were prominent in the community circuit, playing at weddings and family gatherings in Southall. They had an early break on the BBC TV Asian programme, Nai Zindagi Naya Jeevan.

In 1978, they were discovered by talent scout Pran Gohill of Multitone Records and they recorded several albums with the label. Teri Chunni de Sitare (1979) was the first album to be recorded by a British bhangra group, and is widely recognised as marking the birth of the ‘Southall scene’.

In 1984, they began work with Deepak Kazanchi on the album Ten Chunm De Sitare, which introduced elements of contemporary electronic dance music into the band’s sound.

== Legacy ==
The success of Teri Chuni De Sitare has been linked to the emergence of professional British Bhangra bands that along with Alaap have been dubbed the 'Southall sound', such as Heera and Holle Holle.

Their songs were used in the films Yari Jatt Di (1984), Dil, and Hatya.
