= Roland SH-1000 =

1973 analogue synthesizer

SH-1000
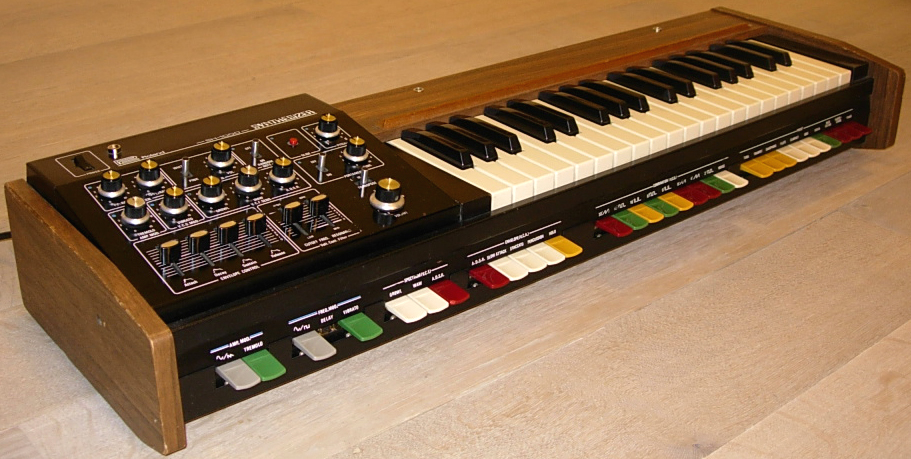
- Manufacturer: Roland
- Dates: 1973–1981

Technical specifications
- Polyphony: Monophonic
- Timbrality: Monotimbral
- Oscillator: 1 VCO
- LFO: 1 (sine) ext_control = CV/Gate (for the vcf only)
- Synthesis type: Analog Subtractive
- Filter: Resonance, Lowpass attenuator = 1 ADSR
- Aftertouch expression: No
- Velocity expression: No
- Storage memory: 10 factory presets
- Effects: None

Input/output
- Keyboard: 37 keys

The Roland SH-1000, introduced in 1973, was the first compact synthesizer produced in Japan, and the first synthesizer produced by Roland. It resembles a home organ more than a commercial synth, with coloured tabs labelled with descriptions of its presets and of the "footage" of the divide-down oscillator system used in its manually editable synthesizer section. It produced electronic sounds that many professional musicians sought after whilst being easier to obtain and transport than its Western equivalents.

The synthesizer has 10 simple preset voices combined with a manually editable section which can be manually tweaked around to create new interesting sounds. No user program memory is available. Its effects include white noise generator, portamento, octave transposition, two low frequency oscillators and a random note generator.

Even with a single oscillator, it sounds like there are several thanks to the 8 sub-osc keys. The ninth is the (white or pink) noise.

== Notable SH-1000 users ==
- Jarvis Cocker (Pulp)
- Blondie
- The Human League
- OMD
- The Band
- Fad Gadget
- Giorgio Moroder
- Mr. Midi
- Imagination: "In the Heat of the Night" (1982), bass instrument
- Jethro Tull
- Eddie Jobson (with Roxy Music)
- Jolley & Swain: Backtrackin' (1985), bass instrument
- Tetsuya Komuro
- Omar Rodriguez Lopez
- Radio Massacre International
- Steve Roach
- Barry White: Change (1982), bass instrument
- Vangelis
- Maksim Dunayevsky
- Cardiacs
- Boney M.
- Sebastian Hardie (1974)
