= Premi (band) =

British Asian bhangra band

- Origin: United Kingdom
- Genres: Bhangra
- Years active: 1981–present
- Members: Johal Premi; Kuljit Bhamra; Pali Cheema
- Website: kedarecords.com/artist/premi/

Premi is a British Asian bhangra band from Southall originally founded by singer/poet Johal Premi in 1981, with toombi player and poet Pali Cheema, with Kuljit Bhamra MBE producing and also on keyboards and percussion. The band recorded their first album Chhammak Jehi Mutiar Da in 1983. The group's songs, Tina O Tina, Giddha Pa Nikkiey and Nachdi di Gooth Khulgaye are still enjoyed on some British South Asian wedding dance floors.

== History ==
Premi was formed in Southall in the early 1980s by singer and lyricist Johal Premi, with poet and tumbi player Pali Cheema also taking part in the group’s beginnings. Their first album, Chhamak Jehi Mutiar Da, came out in 1983 with music arranged by Kuljit Bhamra. Immediately after mixing, Johal Premi took a cassette tape of the songs to show his singer-friend Kumar Heera, who lived nearby (he was setting up Heera Group.

Premi's catalogue includes several songs that continue to be played more than three decades later at weddings and community events.

Radio 1 DJ John Peel saw the band play live at the ICA in June 1987, stating that Premi played a "blinder" in particular highlighting the "storm of rhythm" around the dholak drum. Later that year in August 1987 the band were invited to record a Peel Session for broadcast on BBC Radio 1. Band member Raju cited the recording as his "biggest highlight" while in the group.

According to The Guardian newspaper, Premi are one of the "most famous" UK bhangra acts, selling significant quantities of records but not attracting mainstream media attention. In 2013 the BBC Asian Network ran a poll to find the 50 Greatest Bhangra Anthems. Premi track "Nachdi Di Gooth Khul Gaye" was listed at number 42. In an Allmusic album review the group was called a "pioneer of pop bhangra", and in 2019 the Eastern Eye newspaper stated Premi were "Legendary".

As of 2019, the band continues to perform. The line-up, although changing over the years, includes original members Jaswinder Singh Matharu and Harmesh Singh Johal.

=== Johal Premi solo career ===
Johal Premi gained recognition with songs such as “O Tina O Tina”, which continues to appear on streaming platforms. He has also performed under the name Premi Johal, releasing singles including “Tu Meri Sardarni” and appearing in radio and video interviews discussing his music.

== Discography ==
=== Albums ===
- Chhammak Jehi Mutiar Da (1983, Not On Label)
- Mein Tere Hogayee (1986, Multitone Records)
- I Love ❤ Premi ~ Nachdi Di Gooth Khulgaye ~ The World Favourite (1987, Multitone Records)
- At The Front Line (1988, Multitone Records)
- World Favourite Premi No. 1 (1988, Multitone Records)
- Strikes Again (1989, Multitone)
- Nalai Manidhan (with Srini) (1989, Nahata)
- Record Breaker (1990, Multitone)
- Around the World (1991, Multitone)
- IndiFuse 1 (with Bindu) (1991, Multitone)
- Dior Da Viyah (1991)
- The Super Power (1993, Multitone)
- Let’s Dance (1993, Magik Roundabout)
- Bhangra Ten Years On (1994)
- Julie (1995, Multitone)
- Untitled (1999, Audiorec)
- Bhangra Mania X (date unknown)
