= Alan Warren Friedman =

Alan Warren Friedman is Thaman Professor of English and Comparative Literature in the department of English at the University of Texas at Austin. He is a specialist in the work of James Joyce and Samuel Beckett.

== Selected publications ==
- Fictional Death and The Modernist Enterprise. Cambridge University Press, 1995.
- "Party Pieces in Joyce's 'Dubliners'" James Joyce Quarterly, Vol. 36, No. 3 (Spring, 1999), pp. 471–484.
- Beckett in Black and Red: Samuel Beckett's Translations for Nancy Cunard's Negro. University of Kentucky Press, Louisville, 2000.
- Party Pieces: Oral Storytelling and Social Performance in Joyce and Beckett. Syracuse University Press, Syracuse, 2007. ISBN 978-0-8156-3123-1
- "Death and Beyond in J.B. Priestley's Johnson over Jordan", New Theatre Quarterly, 22.1 (February 2006): 76–90.
- "Biographical Joyce", James Joyce Quarterly, 45.3-4 Spring/Summer 2008. (with Charles Rossman)
- "De-familiarizing Readings: Essays from the Austin Joyce Conference". European Joyce Studies 18. Editions Rodopi: Amsterdam and New York, 2009 (with Charles Rossman).
- "Samuel Beckett in Austin and Beyond", Texas Studies in Language and Literature, 51.1 March 2009. (with Charles Rossman).
- "Samuel Beckett Meets Buster Keaton: Godeau, Film, and New York", Texas Studies in Language and Literature, 51.1 (March 2009), pp. 41–46.
