= Bhujhangy Group =

Bhangra music band

The Bhujhangy Group was founded in Smethwick, near Birmingham, England, in 1967 by Balbir Singh Khanpur & brother Dalbir Singh Khanpur whose parents had come to the United Kingdom in the mid 1950s then joined their families in 1964, initially working as labourers in the West Midlands' factories. They were named Bhujhangy – meaning "kids" – as they were still teenagers, and their first recording was "Teri Chithi Noon Parthan", a 7" EP recorded in 1967 and distributed manually in pub juke boxes before being officially recorded and distributed in late 1969–70.

Bhujhangy appeared on television in 1969 as part of the celebrations of Sri Guru Nanak Dev Ji Maharaj 500th birthday and the same year approached Oriental Star Agencies with a view to making further recordings. The group had always been interested in western music as well as traditional Punjabi music, learning to play the guitar, banjo and accordion as well as the dhol, tumbi and dholak. Their music gradually incorporated wider influences including modern western rhythms and sounds from Hindi-speaking Bollywood culture. Their early 1970 single "Bhabiye Akh Larr Gayee" lyric By Bhujhangy Group was the first recording to combine traditional Asian sounds with modern western musical instruments and influences, a momentous step in the development of bhangra.

Balbir Bhujhangy received an award from the House of Commons of the United Kingdom for Punjabi cultural and Bhangra music in 2009 and a Lifetime Achievement Award from Brit Asia TV Music Awards in 2011.
