= Bhangra (music) =

Type of popular music associated with Punjabi culture

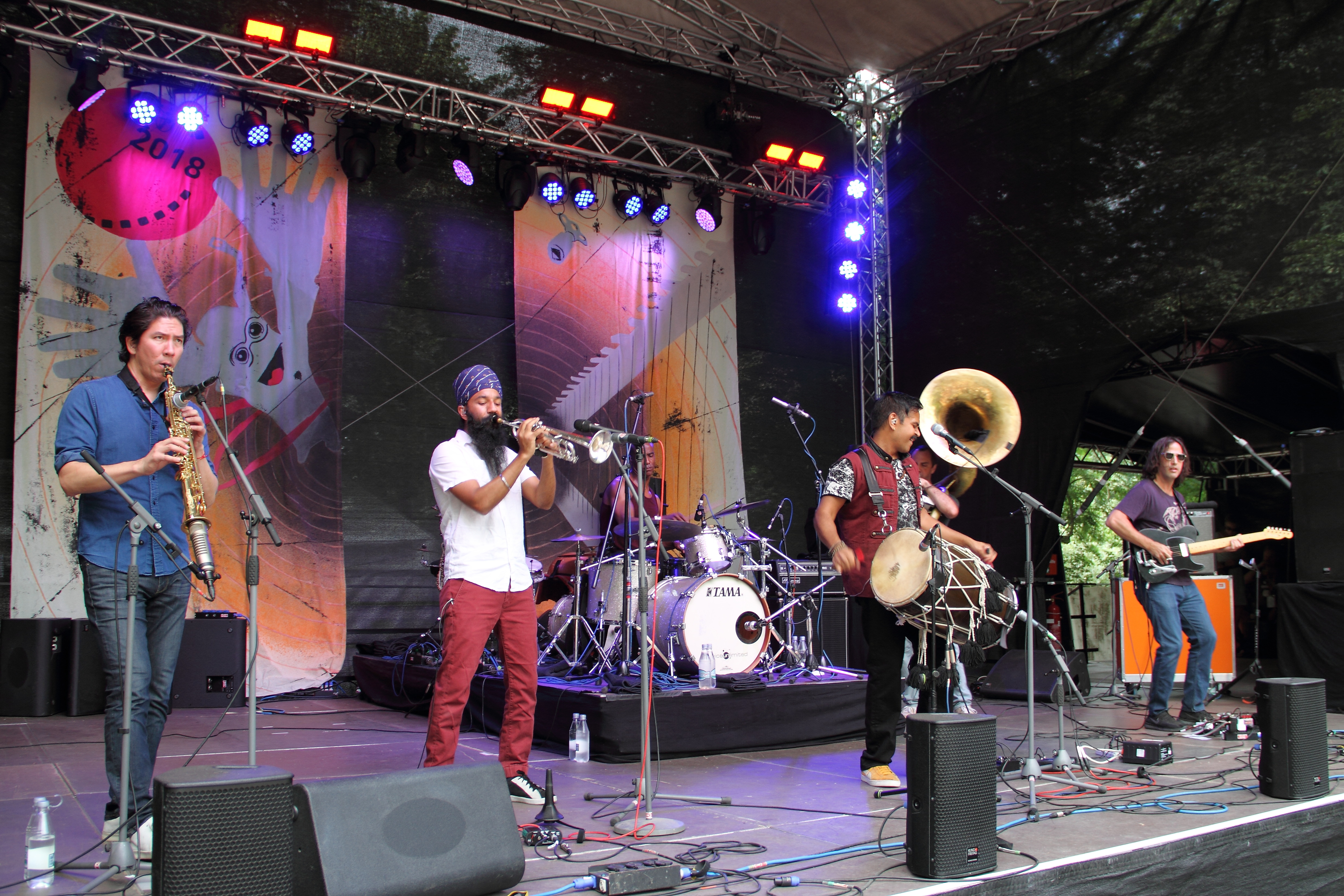
- Stylistic origins: Punjabi traditional folk; pop
- Cultural origins: 1960s, Punjab
- Derivative forms: Bhangragga

Bhangra
- Punjabi language
- Gurmukhi: ਭੰਗੜਾ
- Shahmukhi: بَھن٘گڑا
- Transliteration: bhaṅgṛā
- IPA: [ˈpə̀ŋɡ(ə)ɽaː]

Bhangra (Punjabi pronunciation: [ˈpə̀ŋɡ(ə)ɽaː]) is a type of music of the Punjab region. It is a prominent form of entertainment and a means of expressing joy, particularly during festive and celebratory occasions. The dhol, a double-sided drum played with two sticks, is the best-known instrument in Bhangra, traditionally accompanied by instruments like the tumbi, sarangi, dholak, and various modern additions such as the synthesizer and guitar.

Over the years, bhangra has evolved and gained popularity not only in South Asia but also around the world. It has become a significant part of the cultural identity of the Punjabi diaspora in countries like Australia, the United Kingdom, Canada, and the United States. Prior to this musical fusion, bhangra existed only as a dance form in the native Punjab. This Punjabi music was unique in that it was neither traditional nor did it seek any authenticity. While the traditional folk music of Punjab has a set of melodies that are used by various singers, bhangra was a form of strict "band culture" in that new melodies were composed for each song. Therefore, the musicians were as important as the singers.

== Origins ==
The roots of modern bhangra music date back to the Sikh Punjabi community in Punjab during the 1960s. An early pop music and modern recording group of this type of music in the United Kingdom was the Bhujhangy Group, founded by Tarlochan Singh Bilga, Balbir Singh Khanpur, Gurpal, Rajinder Dhona, and Dalvir Kahanpuri in Birmingham in 1971. The Bhujhangy Group's first major hit was "Bhabiye Akh Larr Gayee". It was written by Tarlochan Singh Bilga in the early 1970s and was released on Birmingham's Oriental Star Agencies label. This was the first bhangra song to combine traditional Asian music with modern Western instruments.

=== Differences from folk music ===
Although bhangra music used many of the elements of Punjabi folk music (e.g., "Bakkrey Bulaaney" – the goat herding vocalizations), it was also radically different in its embrace of modernity. The song structure of a typical bhangra song featured four verses, a chorus, along with two alternating instrumental bridge sections (e.g., CVB1CVB2CVB1CVB2C). Hence it featured more musicianship than its folk predecessor.

== United Kingdom ==
A modern and commercial form of bhangra music rose in Britain in the 1970s by Punjabi immigrants who took their native folk music and began experimenting by altering it using instruments from their host country, particularly in cities such as Birmingham, Bradford, and Leicester. The new genre quickly became popular in Britain replacing Punjabi folk singers due to it being heavily influenced in Britain by the infusion of rock music and a need to move away from the simple and repetitive Punjabi folk music. It indicated the development of a self-conscious and distinctively rebellious British Asian youth culture centred on an experiential sense of self, e.g., language, gesture, bodily signification, desires, etc., in a situation in which tensions with British culture and racist elements in British society had resulted in alienation in many minority ethnic groups, fostered a sense of need for an affirmation of a positive identity and culture, and provided a platform for British Punjabi males to assert their masculinity.

In the 1980s, distributed by record labels such as Oriental Star Agencies and Multitone Records, bhangra artists were selling over 50,000 cassettes a week in the UK, but no artists reached the Top 40 UK chart despite these artists outselling popular British ones; most of the bhangra cassette sales were sold through local shops and not the larger record stores, and bypassed official sales and charts.

The group Alaap was formed in 1977 and co-founded by Channi Singh and Harjeet Gandhi, both whom hailed from Southall, a Punjabi area in London. Their album Teri Chunni De Sitaray was released in 1982 by Multitone. Alaap was considered the first and original superstar bhangra band formed in the United Kingdom. Channi Singh has been awarded the OBE by the Queen for his services to bhangra music and services/charity for the British Asian community. Co-founder Harjeet Gandhi died in 2003.

In 1983, the band DCS formed, founded by Shin and Danny Choranji. DCS are recognised as an influential band from their 1980s releases on Multitone include 123 Go and O.U.1.

Danny Choranji was instrumental in bringing wider visibility of bhangra to the UK through BBC Radio. On 30 October 1989, Asian Network (later BBC Asian Network) was launched, and Choranji's show Eastern Beat would showcase bhangra from the likes of Golden Star, Achanak and Johnny Zee. The launch of the commercial station Sunrise Radio also in 1989 was an important moment.

The scene was particularly centred around daytime raves, with young revellers "bunking off school to attend".

One of the biggest bhangra stars of the last several decades is Malkit Singh and his band Golden Star. Singh also worked with Tarlochan Singh Bilga (TSB Golden Star). Singh and his band has toured 27 countries, and has been awarded an MBE for his services to bhangra music.

Bhangra boy band, the Sahotas, were composed of five brothers from Wolverhampton. Their music is a fusion of bhangra, rock and dance.

Heera, formed by Bhupinder Bhindi and fronted by Kumar and Dhami, was one of the most popular bands of the 1980s.

Bands like Alaap and Heera incorporated rock-influenced beats into bhangra, because it enabled "Asian youth to affirm their identities positively" within the broader environment of alternative rock as an alternative way of expression. However, some believe that the progression of bhangra music created an "intermezzo culture" post-India's partition, within the unitary definitions of Southeast Asians within the diaspora, thus "establishing a brand new community in their home away from home".

Several other influential groups appeared around the same time, including The Saathies, Premi, Bhujungy Group, and Apna Sangeet. Apna Sangeet, best known for their hit "Mera Yaar Vajavey Dhol", re-formed for charity in May 2009 after a break-up.

In the early-mid 1990s, influenced by house music, and hip hop, bhangra increasingly fused traditional instruments and vocals with sampling, synthesisers, and remixing. Artists such as Johnny Zee, Bally Sagoo, and Talvin Singh. The Birmingham-based record label Nachural Records was heavily responsible for putting out UK bhangra throughout the 90s and particularly remixes of Achanak and TSB Golden Star.

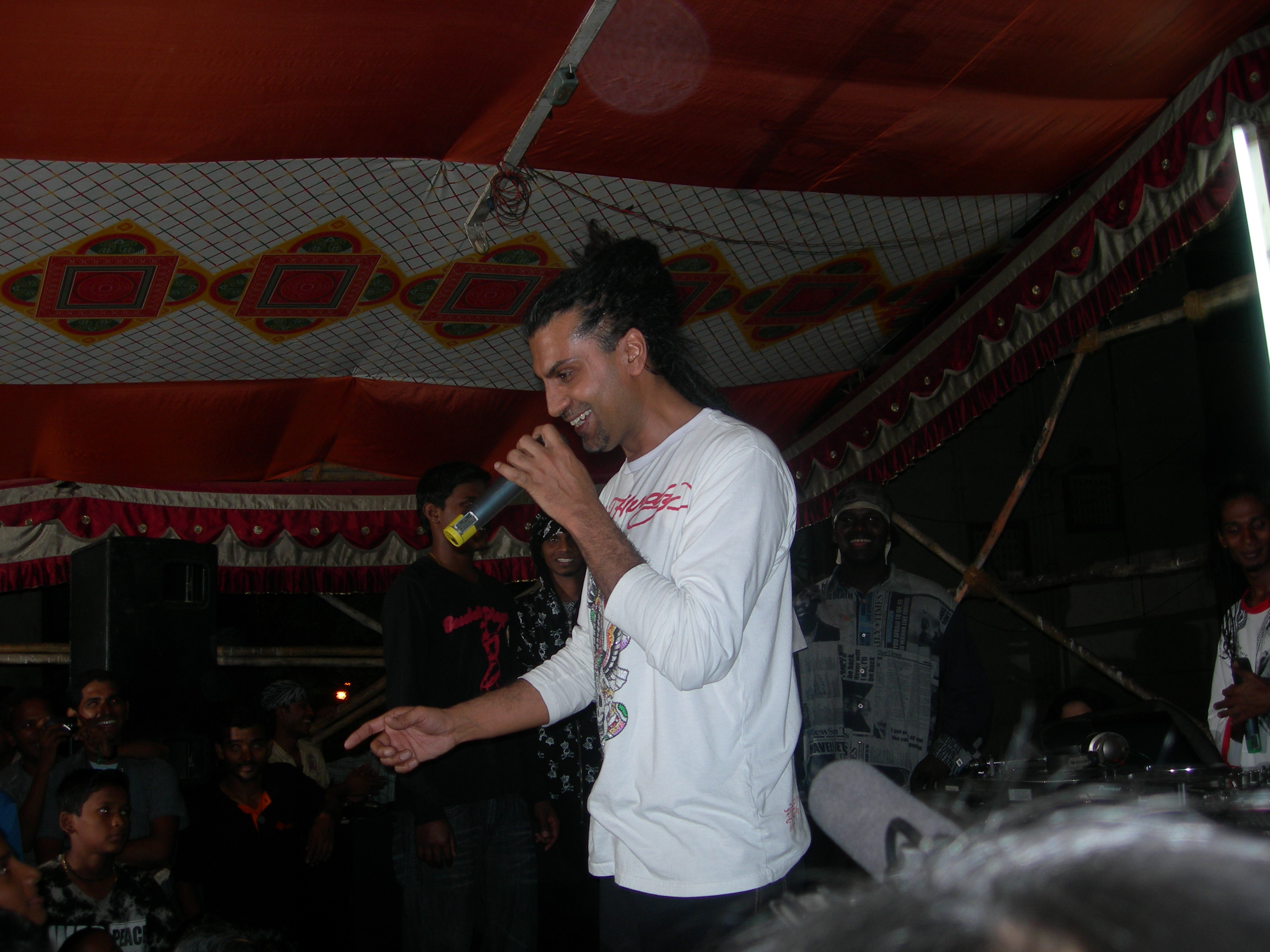
Apache Indian performing in 2009

The fusion of bhangra with dancehall reggae resulted in the derivative of bhangragga or bhangramuffin, and is most connected with Handsworth born Apache Indian. Indian, and his producers, combined elements of percussion-heavy – a distinct holdover from bhangra – with a propulsive beat clearly designed for dancing. The dancehall influence can be felt through the use of pre-programmed music, similar to Dancehall "riddims". Lyrically, the style features a combination of Sub-Continental-accented (usually Indian) vocals delivered in the clipped style associated with dancehall – and sometimes including the Patois of the latter style.

Bally Sagoo is a Punjabi-Sikh, Anglo-Indian raised in Birmingham, England. Sagoo has described his music as "a bit of tablas, a bit of the Indian sound. But bring on the bass lines, bring on the funky-drummer beat, bring on the James Brown samples", to Time magazine in 1997. He was signed by Sony. Daler Mehndi, a Punjabi singer from India has a type of music known as "folk pop". Mehndi has released tracks such as "Bolo Ta Ra Ra" and "Ho Jayegee Balle Balle". His song "Tunak Tunak Tun" was released in 1998.

Into the noughties, the fusing of genres has continued with Panjabi MC and H Dhami.

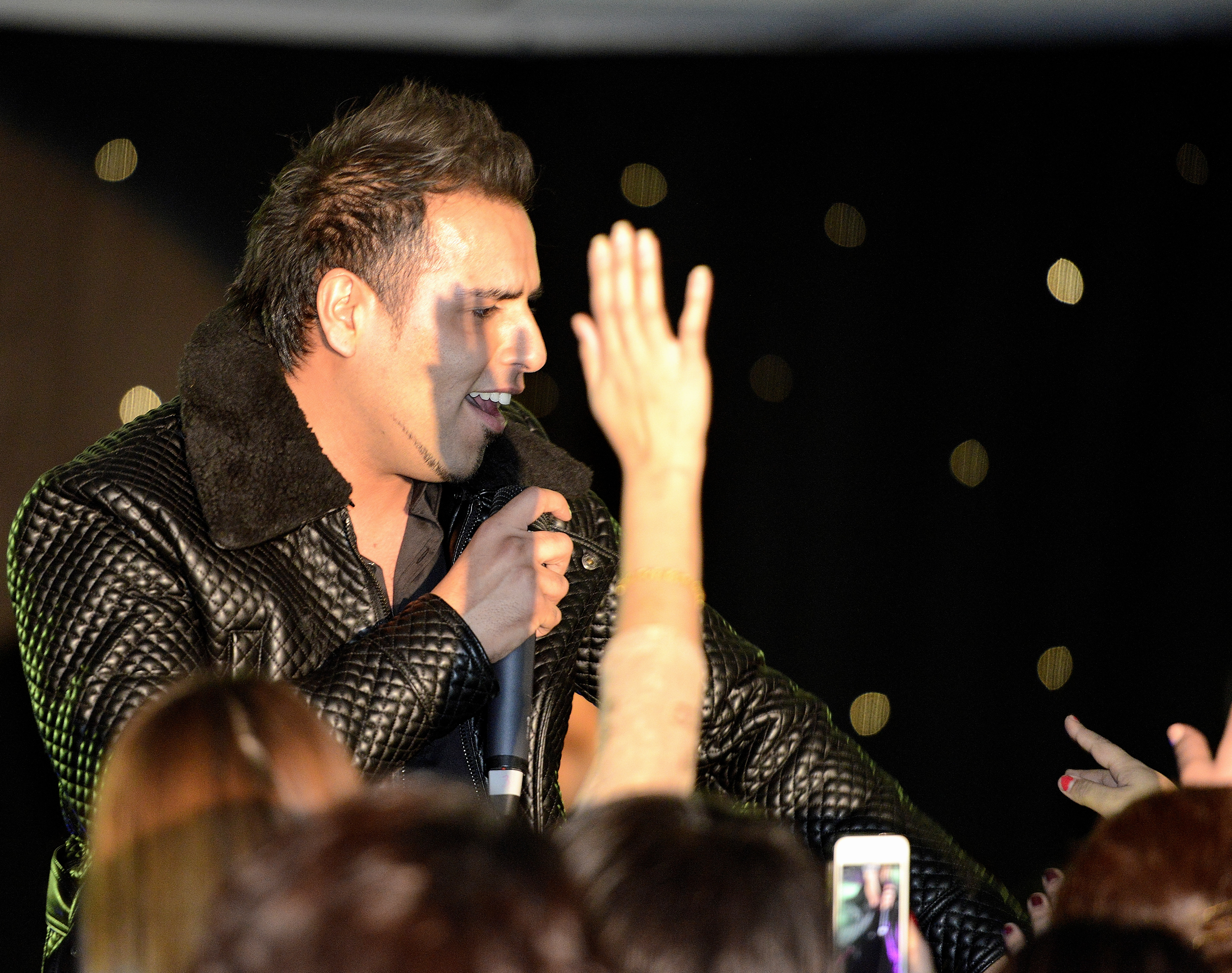
H Dhami performing in 2013

By the end of the 1990s, bhangra music had largely declined and been replaced with Punjabi folk singers. The same folk singers which bhangra bands had replaced a decade earlier were being utilized by DJs to make relatively inexpensive live music on laptops. This "folkhop" genre was short lived as records could not be officially released due to nonclearance copyrights on samples used to create the "beat". This continued until the end of the century. Folk-hop record labels such as Hi-Tech were investigated by BPI (British Phonographic Industry) for copyright infringement by way of uncleared samples on releases by folk DJs such as DJ Sanj.

A BBC Four documentary Pump Up The Bhangra was broadcast in August 2018. Presented by Bobby Friction, it documented the cultural history and impact of bhangra in Britain.

== Canada and the United States ==
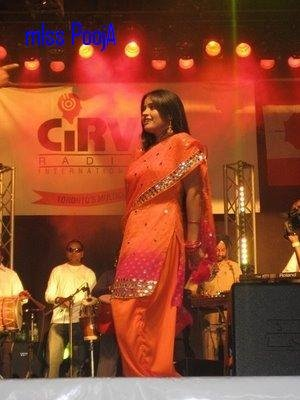
Miss Pooja, famous for her numerous album releases

Punjabi immigrants have encouraged the growth of Punjabi folk music in the Western hemisphere rather than bhangra music. The bhangra industry has grown in North America much less than in the United Kingdom.

North American (non bhangra) folk artists such as Manmohan Waris, Jazzy B, Kamal Heer, Harbhajan Mann, Sarabjit Cheema, and Debi Makhsoospuri have emerged and the remix market has grown.

In 2001, Punjabi folk, and its hip-hop form, folkhop, began to exert an influence over US R&B music, when Missy Elliott released the folkhop-influenced song "Get Ur Freak On". In 2003, a version of Panjabi MC's "Mundian To Bach Ke" ("Beware of the Boys") featured U.S. rapper Jay-Z. Additionally, American rapper Pras of The Fugees recorded tracks with British alternative bhangra band Swami. American singer and actress Selena Gomez released her bhangra-influenced single "Come & Get It" from her first solo album Stars Dance in 2013.

== Lyrics ==
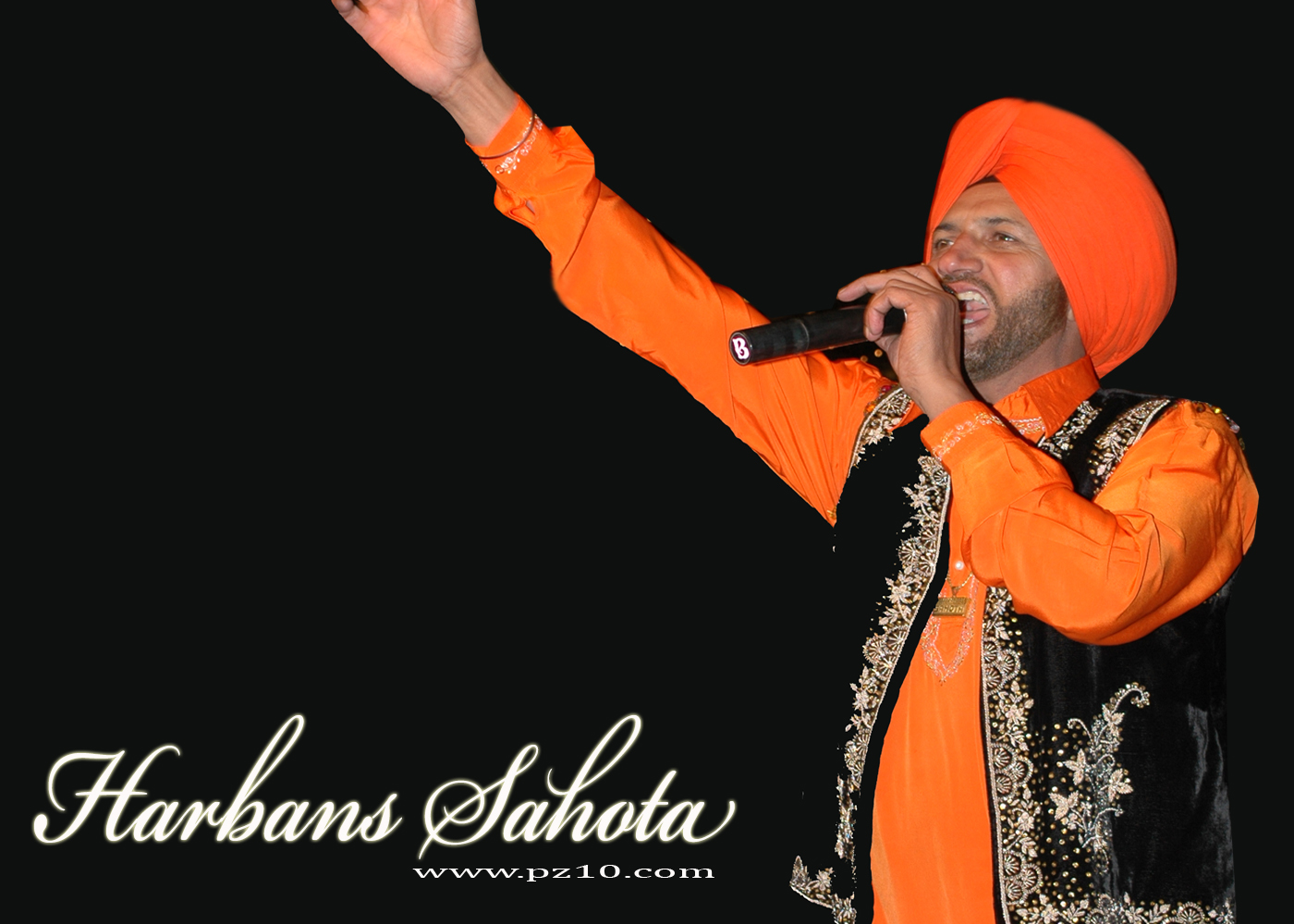
Bhangra lyrics, which generally cover social issues or love, are sung in Punjabi.

Bhangra lyrics, which generally cover social issues or love, are sung in Punjabi. Bhangra lyrics were generally kept deliberately simple by the creators of the genre because the youth did not understand complex lyrics. Traditional Punjabi folk lyrics are generally more complex and often tell the tales of Punjabi history. There are many bhangra songs devoted to Punjabi pride themes and Punjabi heroes. The lyrics are tributes to the cultural traditions of Punjab. In particular, many bhangra tracks have been written about Udham Singh and Bhagat Singh. Less serious topics include beautiful women with their colourful duppattas. Lyrics can also be about crops and the coming of a new season. Bhangra is sung fiercely with strong lyrics often yelling: "balle balle" or "chakde phate", which refer to celebration and/or pride.

Notable bhangra or Punjabi lyricists include Harbans Jandu who wrote "Giddhian Di Rani".

== Instruments ==
Punjabi instruments contribute to bhangra. Originally this was primarily the dhol. The 20th century has brought changes to the instruments that define bhangra, to include the tumbi, sarangi, dholak (smaller than the dhol), flute, zither, fiddle, harmonium, tabla, guitar, mandolin, saxophone, synthesizer, drum set, and other Western instruments. Perhaps the most famous bhangra instrument is the dhol. It is a double-sided barrel drum that creates the beat to which bhangra is danced. The person who plays the instrument, the dholi, plays various beats to create the different bhangra segments, such as Dhamaal, Jhummar, One side of the dhol has thicker skin, which creates a deeper sound, and the other side has a thinner skin, resulting in a higher-pitched sound. Two sticks are used to play the dhol instrument. The thicker stick, called the dagga, is used to play the bass side. The thinner tilli is used to play the treble side. Both sticks are usually made of wood or bamboo.

The string instruments include the guitar (both electrical), bass, sitar, tumbi, veena, violin and sarangi. The snare, toms, dhadd, dafli, dholki, and damru are the other drums. The tumbi was originally played by folk artists such as Lalchand Yamla Jatt. The Kuldip Manak, which appeared in true folk recordings — notably used by Chamkila, a Punjabi folk (not bhangra) singer — is a high-tone, single-string instrument and Chimta by (Late) Alam Lohar.

== Cultural impact and resurgence of Punjabi folk music in the West ==
The third and fourth generation are generally unable to speak Punjabi if their parents could hardly speak it. There is a move towards Punjabi folk music which is the purest form of Punjabi music. Much of the youth struggle to understand the lyrics, although, there are some children and young adults who have maintained their folk roots. Another reason why some fans express an anti-folk sentiment is that many folk songs were written for the dominant Jatts clan whereas Sikhs do not believe in castes, so they disapproved of Punjabi folk music. However, today with artists like Jazzy B, PMC, Sukhshinder Shinda and Diljit Dosanjh, Punjabi folk has increased in popularity although it is fused in some cases. iTunes has catalogs of many Punjabi folk singers available.

Another cause of the resurgence of Punjabi folk music is due to the increased popularity of bhangra in areas like the UK, Canada and U.S. Bhangra has become more accessible through social media platforms such as YouTube and Instagram, for the younger generation. In addition, multiple universities, across the UK, US and Canada have teams as well as academies being set up by senior dancers separate from universities. This resurgence has led to a desire for more traditional folk songs and beats, but also a learning opportunity for children of their cultures.

== See also ==
- List of bhangra artists
- Music of Punjab
- Punjabi culture
- Asian Underground
- Multitone records
- Dhol
- Punjab region
- Music of the United Kingdom
- Turbo-folk
