= Heera Group UK =

British Asian bhangra band

Heera
- Also known as: Quallander Group, HEERA, Heera Group UK
- Origin: United Kingdom
- Genres: Bhangra
- Years active: 1979 - present
- Labels: Saregama
- Spinoffs: H-Dhami; Premi
- Members: Palvinder Dhami; Kumar Heera
- Website: facebook.com/HeeraBand/

Heera Group UK are a British Asian bhangra band founded in 1979 by Satwant Singh Taak. They are known as pioneers of the British Asian bhangra scene. In 1983 they released their first album, Bhabi Te Nanaan Nachdi, with music by Charnjit Ahuja. The band’s current members are Palvinder Dhami and Kumar Heera.

== History ==
Heera Group was founded in 1979 by Satwant Singh Taak. Taak later invited Kumar Heera and Palvinder Dhami, both from India.

Heera broke records with their songs Dowain Jaaniya, Sas Kutni, Boliyan and Jagh Wala Mela.

Their song Maar Chadapa was featured in the 2019 film Blinded by the Light.

Heera toured worldwide, bringing British Bhangra to a wider audience. Notably, Ghazal pioneer Jagjit Singh brought Heera to Delhi, performing a sold-out concert. Actor Dharmendra also had Heera appear at the wedding of his son, Bobby Deol.

Heera were the first bhangra band to appear on mainstream British TV, notably in 1988 Blue Peter, with song Beat the Rhythm.

== Career ==
With Charnjit Ahuja's music they released the album Bhabi Te Nanaan Nachdi in 1983. Jagh Wala Mela saw them collaborate with legendary Kuljit Bhamra, who had produced Kumar Heera's friend's band Premi's album Nachdi Di Gooth Khulgaye. Their iconic albums such as Diamonds from Heera and Cool & Deadly (Rabba Ki Kariye) with Deepak Khazanchi as music director paved Heeras unique sound that they are known for. Later on J. Kumar also went sing "Teri Meri Ek Jind" in Bollywood. Palvinder Dhami became a solo singer in the Punjabi folk industry and acted in many movies. The duo continues to perform worldwide and have a recording studio in London used to promote new talent.

== Albums ==
- Bhabhi te Nanaan Nachdi
- Diamonds from Heera
- Bhangra Fever Vol 1
- Rabba Ki Kariye (Cool and Deadly)
- Beyond Control
- Jagh Wala Mela
- Yaaran Di Yaari
- Kohinoor
- Back to Desi
- Alaap & Heera Group Vol - 1
- Alaap & Heera Group Vol - 2
- Shaheed Udham Singh - Boli kich ke
- Legends Boliyan - GV
- PBN - Lak Hilda
- Jit Pakki saddi hai

== Awards ==
The group was awarded a "Lifetime Achievement" award at the 2008 UK Asian Music Awards.
