= Navraj Hans =

Indian singer

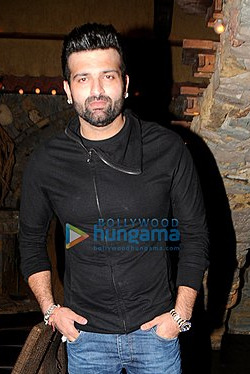

Background information
- Born: Navraj Hans; Jalandhar, Punjab, India
- Years active: 2012–present
- Labels: Sony Music India; Speed Records; Eros International; T-Series
- Spouse: Ajit Kaur Mehndi
- Website: Official site

Navraj Hans is an Indian singer, actor, entrepreneur, cricket player and performer. He is the son of Hans Raj Hans and son-in-law of Daler Mehndi.

== Musical career ==
Navraj Hans has done playback singing for several Bollywood and Punjabi movies. His song "Saiyaan" by Sony Music India featured in the Punjabi movie Burrraahh. His song "Jind meriye" is from the Bollywood movie Purani Jeans. In 2016, he sang "Sadi Rail Gaddi" in film Tutak Tutak Tutiya. In 2018, he sang "Chote Chote Peg" with Neha Kakkar and "Yo Yo Honey Singh" for Sonu Ke Titu Ki Sweety, "Mundiyaan Tu Bachke" with Palak Muchhal for Baaghi 2, and "Rangdaari" with Arko Pravo Mukherjee for Daas Dev.

== Acting career ==
Since 2013, Navraj has appeared in many Punjabi feature films. His acting debut was in Sing the Singhs. In 2015, his film Punjabian Da King was released. He also appeared in the Punjabi film Dil Le Gayi Kudi Punjab Di and the Bollywood film Band of Maharajas.

== Filmography ==
Year	Film	Role	Notes
2013	Rab Ton Sohna Ishq	Guest appearance	
2014	Marriage Da Garriage	Raj	Debut
2015	Punjabian Da King	Contract Killer	With Keeya Khanna / on T-Series
2015	Dil Le Gayi Kudi Punjab Di		
TBA	Band of Maharajas		Bollywood debut
2016	Canada Di Flight	Harry	

== Discography ==
=== Bollywood ===
Year	Film	Song	Composer	Lyrics	Co-singer
2014	Purani Jeans	"Jind Meriye"	Ram Sampath		
2016	Tutak Tutak Tutiya	"Rail Gaddi"	Gurinder Seagal	Shabbir Ahmed	Swati Sharma
2016	A Flying Jatt	"Raj Karega Khalsa"	Sachin-Jigar	Priya Saraiya	Daler Mehndi
2017	Mubarakan	"Jatt Jaguar"	Amaal Mallik	Kumaar	Vishal Dadlani, Apeksha Dandekar
2017	Sarkar 3	"Thamba"	Rohan Vinayak, Ravi Shankar		
2018	Veerey Ki Wedding	"Veerey Ki Wedding Title Track"	Ashok Punjabi	Ashok Punjabi, Chandan Bakshi	Saloni Thakker
2018	Baaghi 2	"Mundiyan" Remake	Sandeep Shirodkar	Ginni Diwan	Palak Muchhal
2018	Sonu Ke Titu Ki Sweety	"Chote Chote Peg" Remake	Yo Yo Honey Singh		Neha Kakkar, Yo Yo Honey Singh
2018	Daas Dev	"Rangdaari"	Arko Pravo Mukherjee	Arko, Munir Niazi	Arko
2018	FryDay	"Kauva Party"	Gunwant Sen	Sajid Qureshi	
2019	Ek Ladki Ko Dekha Toh Aisa Laga	"Gud Naal Ishq Meetha" Remake	Rochak Kohli	Gurpreet Saini	Harshdeep Kaur
2019	De De Pyaar De	"Vaadi Sharaban" Remake	Vipin Patwa	Kumaar	Sunidhi Chauhan
2019	Batla House	"Jako Raake Saiyaan" Remake	Rochak Kohli	Gurpreet Saini, Gautam Sharma	Rochak Kohli
2019	Blank	Ali Ali (Reprise)	Arko Pravo Mukherjee	Arko, Aidep Singh	
2019	Bombairiya	Bairiya	Arko Pravo Mukherjee	Arko	
2019	Bombairiya	Bairiya (Reprise)	Arko Pravo Mukherjee	Arko	Akriti Kakkar
2019	Jhootha Kahin Ka	"Jhootha Kahin Ka Title Track"	Sanjeev-Ajay, Rahul Jain	Sanjeev Chaturvedi	Rahul Jain, Ankit Saainraj
2019	Junglee	"Garje Gajraj Hamara"	Sameer Uddin	Kumar Suryavanshi	Hamsika Iyer, Abhishek Naiwal
2020	Happy Hardy and Heer	"Le Jaana"	Himesh Reshammiya	Kumaar	Himesh Reshammiya, Harshdeep Kaur, Asees Kaur
2020	Happy Hardy and Heer	"Tik Tok"	Himesh Reshammiya	Himesh Reshammiya	Himesh Reshammiya, Shannon K, Raja Sagoo
2020	Street Dancer 3D	"Mile Sur"	Sachin–Jigar	Jigar Saraiya, Vayu, IP Singh	Shalmali Kholgade, Divya Kumar, Vayu, Shashwat Singh & IP Singh
2020	Bhangra Paa Le	"Sun Sajna"	Rishi Rich, Yash Narvekar and Kiranee for JAM8	Kiranee and Sholke Laal for JAM8	Jonita Gandhi, Yash Narvekar, Kiranee
2021	The Girl on the Train	"Mera Mahi"	Sunny and Inder Bawra	Kumaar	Jonita Gandhi
2021	Time to Dance	"Thok De Killi"	Rochak Kohli	Kumaar	
2021	Haseen Dilruba	"Dil Melt Karda"	Amit Trivedi	Varun Grover	Nikhita Gandhi
2022	Raksha Bandhan	"Done Kar Do"	Himesh Reshammiya	Irshad Kamil	Jyotica Tangri

== Celebrity cricket league ==
Navraj Hans is a player of the Punjab De Sher cricket team in the Celebrity Cricket League. With 0 sixes and 0 fours Navraj scored his first zero in Punjab De Sher debut match against Mumbai heroes on 28 March 2015 at cricket stadium, Chandigarh, Punjab, India.
