= Shivranjani Singh =

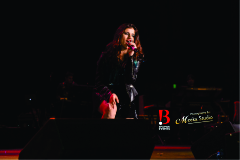

Background information
- Also known as: Shivi
- Born: 27 August 1994 (age 31); Mandi, Mandi district, Himachal Pradesh, India
- Occupation: Playback Singer
- Years active: 2013–present

Shivranjani Shakti Singh popularly known by her stage name Shivi (born 27 August 1994) is an Indian playback singer. She gained notice at the age of 14 when she won Hannah Montana – The Big Pop Star Dream, a reality-television singing-contest on Disney Channel, in 2008. Her Bollywood career began with the song "Solah Baras ki" for the 2013 film, Sixteen. She then went on to sing in various other Bollywood films like Welcome to Karachi, Baankey Ki Crazy Baraat, Dee Saturday Night, Angry Young Man and Hate Story 3. However, she came into prominence with the release of her song "Oh Boy" from the movie Kyaa Kool Hain Hum 3. She also made adlib feature in Yo Yo Honey Singh's Pankhudi song. She also featured in 51 Glorious Days album of Yo Yo Honey Singh with "I'm in Love With You" track.

== Life and career ==
=== Early life (1994–2008) ===
Shivranjani was born and raised in Himachal Pradesh, Mandi district, later moving to Mumbai. She belongs to Himachal Pradesh with Mandi being her hometown. Her father, Shakti Singh, had a musical background with a few albums and Bollywood releases during a varied career as a cricketer and government official. Her mother, Mala Singh, is a business woman with many awards for her green-entrepreneurship.

Shivranjani had always excelled at singing, dancing and acting during her schooling. She started considering singing as a career when she participated in a 2008 reality-television singing-contest, Hannah Montana – The Big Pop Star Dream, on Disney Channel. She emerged as the winner amongst 2 lakh (200,000) participants from across India. Among her prizes was a trip to Los Angeles to meet the cast of Hannah Montana and see the shooting of an episode, and a Gibson guitar signed by Miley Cyrus. Shivranjani met Miley Cyrus on her birthday (27 August). She was also featured on the cover of Disney Adventures magazine and shot a music video which aired on Disney Channel.

=== Early career (2009–2014) ===
In 2013, Shivranjani Singh began studying biochemistry at Mithibai College while pursuing her singing dream. She was also offered acting assignments for television and small-budget movies but maintained that she only wanted to pursue singing. She recorded songs with music directors Ankit Tiwari and Amjad-Nadeem.

=== Bollywood and America (2015–present) ===
Her first big break was offered to her by music director Rochak Kohli for the film Welcome to Karachi. She had 2 songs in the film: "Lalla Lalla Lori" with Vishal Dadhlani and "Boat ma" with Mika Singh. She followed this with Baankey Ki Crazy Baraat, in which she sang "Baby Modern Modern" with Sonu Nigam for music director Vijaya Shanker. For the musical Hate Story 3, she had her first solo song, "Love To Hate You", for music-director Amaal Mallik. Meanwhile, she was invited to perform with music duo Sajid–Wajid, joining them on their Unstoppable tour of America. Shivranjani also recorded "Feed My Soul" with Florida-based music producers Cody Morris and Sudeep Sinha, which was well received by the underground Trap music scene in the US.

On 1 January 2016, Shivranjani's item song "Oh Boy" was released, with Wajid Khan, from the movie Kyaa Kool Hain Hum 3. Composed by Sajid–Wajid, the song had much publicity as the singing debut of actress Mandana Karimi from Big Boss 9 fame, and the controversial nature of the film. Shivranjani came into prominence with this song, and also sang the title track of the movie with Benny Dayal. She is currently working with many music directors and performing in various events and live shows across the country.

== Musical style and influences ==
Shivranjani grew up listening to artists of the west like Beyoncé, Shakira, Celine Dion and Whitney Houston, and is thus primarily a western vocalist. However, she has only recently begun learning Hindustani classical music.

== Discography ==
Song	Movie	Composer	Co-singers	Year
"Solah baras ki"	Sixteen	Gaurav Dargaonkar	Shalmali Kholgade	2013
"Jhatak ke Nacho"	Dee Saturday Night	Ankit Tiwari	Ankit Tiwari, Akriti Kakkar	2015
"Lalla Lalla Lori"	Welcome to Karachi	Rochak Kohli	Vishal Dadhlani	2015
"Boat Ma"	Welcome to Karachi	Rochak Kohli	Mika Singh, Deane Seqiera, Rochak Kohli	2015
"Baby Modern Modern"	Baankey Ki Crazy Baraat	Vijay Shanker	Sonu Nigam	2015
"Love to Hate You"	Hate Story 3	Amaal Mallik		2015
"Oh Boy"	Kyaa Kool Hain Hum 3	Sajid–Wajid	Wajid Khan	2016
Kyaa Kool Hain Hum 3 Title Track	Kyaa Kool Hain Hum 3	Sajid–Wajid	Benny Dayal	
"Gokka Makka"	Devi (2016 film)	Sajid–Wajid		2016
"Suku Suku"	Tutak Tutak Tutiya	Sajid–Wajid	2016	
2017
"Jaanu"	Behen Hogi Teri	Rishi Rich, Juggy D		

=== Independent music ===
- "Feed my soul" – Morris Code and SS feat. Shivranjani Singh – Trap Nation – 2015
- "Chaldi" – Shivi – 2015

== See also ==
- List of Indian playback singers
