= The Project (Rishi Rich album) =

Studio album by Rishi Rich
- Released: 24 July 2006
- Recorded: 2005
- Genre: Bhangra; Punjabi; Alternative hip-hop; UK garage; R&B
- Label: 2Point9 Records
- Producer: Rishi Rich

Rishi Rich chronology
Simply Rich (2002)	The Project (2006)

Singles from The Project
- 1. "Push It Up (Aaja Kurieh)" Released: 21 July 2006

The Project is the second studio album by British producer Rishi Rich. It was released on 24 July 2006 on 2Point9 Records. It features frequent collaborator Juggy D, JD (Dready), Des-C, Jay Sean, Rafaqat Ali Khan and Veronica Mehta.

== Track listing ==
No.	Title	Producer(s)	Length
1.	"The Project (Intro)"	Rishi Rich	0:26
2.	"Flipmode" (featuring JD (Dready) and Des-C)	Rishi Rich	4:23
3.	"Push It Up (Aaja Kurieh)" (featuring Jay Sean and Juggy D)	Rishi Rich	3:09
4.	"Teri Masti" (featuring Josh and Rafaqat Ali Khan)	Rishi Rich	3:55
5.	"Stomp" (featuring JD (Dready), Jay Sean and Mr. Phillips)	Rishi Rich	4:26
6.	"Come Here" (featuring Jay Sean)	Rishi Rich	3:21
7.	"Bhare Bazar" (featuring Master Rakesh)	Rishi Rich	3:22
8.	"Roll It Gal (Rishi Rich version)" (featuring Alison Hinds and Juggy D)	Rishi Rich	3:27
9.	"Kissum (Interlude)"	Rishi Rich	0:42
10.	"Aj Kal" (featuring Juggy D and Veronica)	Rishi Rich	3:34
11.	"Majajneh (Too Stoosh)" (featuring Des-C)	Rishi Rich	3:39
12.	"Sorry" (featuring Rafaqat Ali Khan)	Rishi Rich	3:55
13.	"Do What You Like" (featuring Juggy D and Chhaya)	Rishi Rich	3:26
14.	"Jaan (Interlude)"	Rishi Rich	0:45
15.	"Maar Sootiya" (featuring Jassi Sidhu and JD (Dready))	Rishi Rich	4:33
16.	"Let's Start Talking" (featuring J2K, Baby Blue and Silinder Pardesi)	Rishi Rich	4:01
17.	"Tere Bina" (featuring Veronica)	Rishi Rich	3:40
18.	"Nobody Has To Know (Interlude)"	Rishi Rich	1:05
19.	"Please Me" (featuring Sol and Aamir Khan)	Rishi Rich	6:30
Total length:			59:47
