= Mohammad Asif (cricketer) =

Pakistani former cricketer

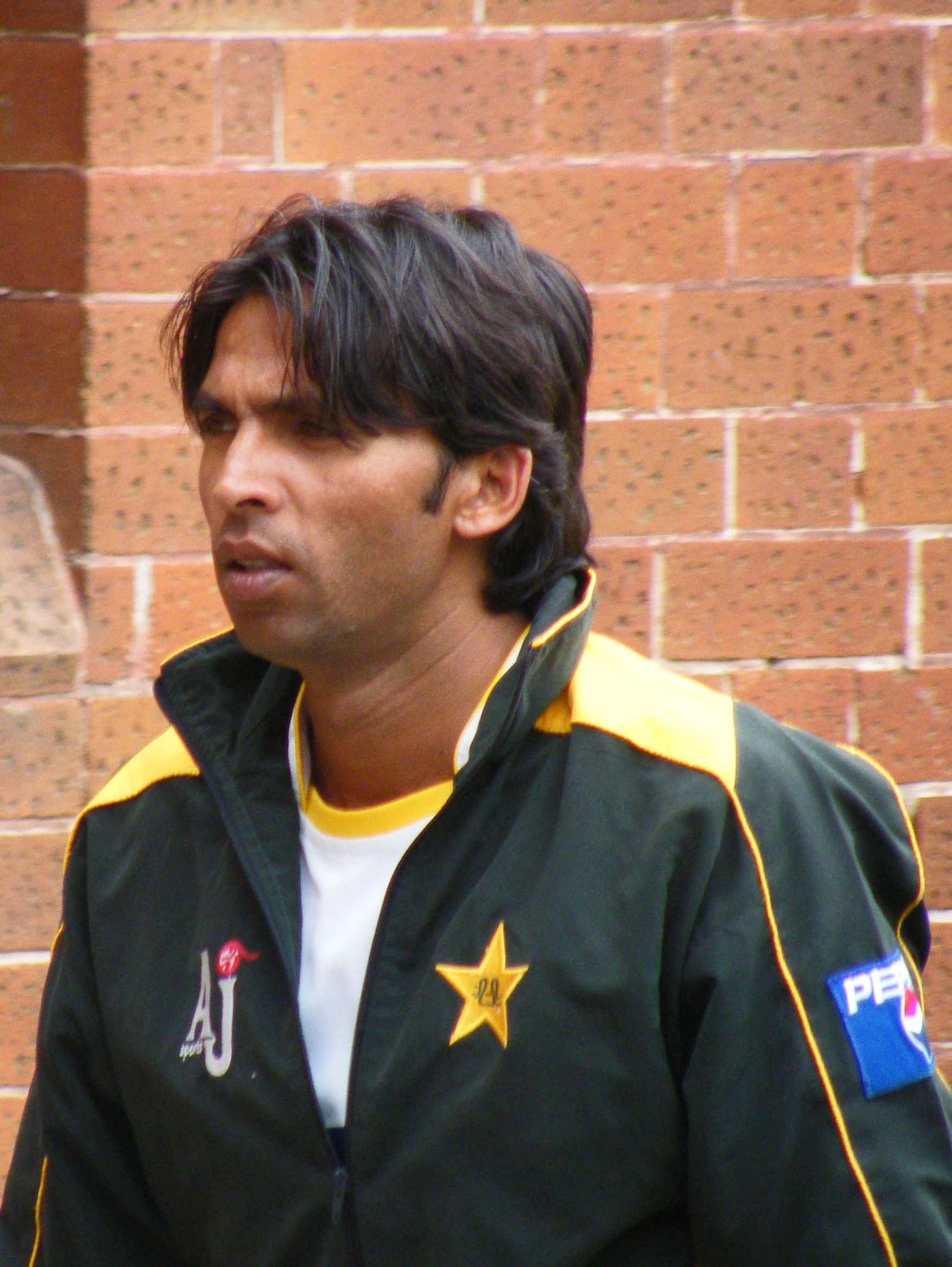
- Asif in 2010

Personal information
- Born: 20 December 1982 (age 43); Sheikhupura, Punjab, Pakistan
- Height: 6 ft 4 in (193 cm)
- Batting: Left-handed
- Bowling: Right armed medium fast
- Role: Bowler

International information
- National side: Pakistan (2005–2010)
- Test debut (cap 184): 3 January 2005 v Australia
- Last Test: 26 August 2010 v England
- ODI debut (cap 154): 21 December 2005 v England
- Last ODI: 21 June 2010 v Bangladesh
- ODI shirt no.: 26
- T20I debut (cap 4): 28 August 2006 v England
- Last T20I: 6 May 2010 v England
- T20I shirt no.: 26

Career statistics
Competition	Test	ODI	T20I
Matches	23	38	11
Runs scored	140	34	9
Batting average	6.55	3.77	7.38
100s/50s	0/0	0/0	0/0
Top score	29	6	5*
Balls bowled	4,997	1,941	257
Wickets	103	46	13
Bowling average	23.18	33.13	26.38
5 wickets in innings	7	0	0
10 wickets in match	1	0	0
Best bowling	6/41	3/28	4/18
Catches/stumpings	3/–	5/–	3/–
- Source: ESPNcricinfo, 21 August 2010

Mohammad Asif (Punjabi: محمد آصف, born 20 December 1982) is a Pakistani former cricketer who played for the Pakistani national cricket team between 2005 and 2010.

A native of Sheikhupura, Asif played first-class cricket for Khan Research Labs, the National Bank, Quetta, Sheikhupura, Sialkot and Leicestershire. He made his Test match debut for the Pakistan cricket team against Australia in January 2005. In 2010, Asif was ranked the second leading Test bowler in the world, behind South Africa's Dale Steyn.

In 2006, Asif tested positive for anabolic steroid Nandrolone, leading to the imposition of a ban which was later overturned on appeal. He was later withdrawn from Pakistan's World Cup squad with an unrelated injury. Further cricket controversy followed when in 2008 he was detained in Dubai suspected of having drugs on his person and was then found to have tested positive for a banned substance during the Indian Premier League. In August 2010 he was accused by the News of the World of deliberately bowling no-balls in return for payment from a betting syndicate. On 5 February 2011 a 3-man tribunal, appointed by the International Cricket Council (ICC) gave the verdict that he was to be banned for 7 years, with 2 of those suspended if no further offences were committed. In November 2011, Asif was convicted, along with Salman Butt and Mohammad Amir, of conspiracy charges relating to spot-fixing. On 3 November 2011, Asif was given a one-year prison sentence for his role in the scandal.

On 19 August 2015, the ICC suspended its previous orders and allowed Asif to play all formats of the game, effective as of 2 September 2015. He played in his first match after the ban when he represented Water and Power Development Authority in the third round of the 2016–17 Quaid-e-Azam Trophy in October 2016.

== Early and personal life ==
Asif was born in the small farming village of Machikay near Sheikhupura, in Pakistan's central Punjab province, into a Gujjar family.

His father Hasan Deen is a farmer who was against Asif's decision to play professional cricket, preferring instead that his four sons get involved in the family business of agriculture and animal breeding.

Public and media reports in Pakistan surfaced that Asif had married Pakistani actress and model Veena Malik, on 28 May 2009, in a private ceremony in London. However it was denied later that the marriage had taken place. In April 2010, Veena Malik filed a complaint against Asif claiming that he threatened to harm her if she did not stop pursuing her demand that he return the loan of around Rs 14 million he had taken from her.

On 2 March 2010, Asif announced his engagement to Sania Asif in Lahore. The couple wed on 1 October 2010, and Asif was reported as stating that he hoped marriage would change his life in a positive way. Attendees included Pakistan Test cricket captain Misbah-ul-Haq and Younis Khan

In December 2018, Asif, his wife and their two children were injured in a road accident in Lahore.

== Bowling style ==
A right hand medium fast bowler with a smooth action and short run up. Asif was able to swing the ball both ways without much change in his bowling action. He also would be able to create sharp seam movement which he was able to do by alternation off fingers whilst releasing the ball. He was able to confuse batsmen as to which way the ball would move and would use his skills to a devastating effect. He was regarded by several batsman as one of the toughest fast bowler ever faced. Great batsmen such as: AB de Villiers, Kevin Pietersen and Hashim Amla have regarded him amongst their toughest bowlers ever faced. England pace bowler James Anderson complimented Asif as key to his development of his seam movement, saying he watched Asif bowl his "Wobble Seam" method.

== Cricket career ==
After impressing in domestic Pakistani cricket, Asif was fast tracked into the Pakistan test squad and made his first appearance against Australia in January 2005. He bowled 18 overs without taking a wicket and Australia won by 9 wickets.

Asif was subsequently dropped from the team but he returned a year later in January 2006 for the home tour against India. In the second Test, Asif bowled 34 overs and took the wicket of Indian cricketer Yuvraj Singh. It was the third Test in Karachi, however, where Asif would make headlines. After a poor batting display by Pakistan, Asif took 4 for 78 in the first innings, including the wickets of V. V. S. Laxman, Rahul Dravid and, once again, Yuvraj Singh, to help Pakistan take a six-run lead. Asif returned in the second innings with three clean bowled wickets of Virender Sehwag, Laxman, and Sachin Tendulkar to lead Pakistan to victory. His series against the Indians was blighted by a fine imposed by match referee Chris Broad for over-appealing and premature celebration of a wicket. The ODI series that followed this Pakistan lost 4–1 to India.

Asif followed up his match-winning efforts against India in Pakistan's next tour in Sri Lanka, where he took a career-best 11 for 71 in the 2nd Test, in another come-from-behind victory.

In November 2005, Leicestershire announced the signing of Asif for the 2006 season after he had played a game for their second XI in 2004. Leicestershire's chairman Neil Davidson described him as a "bowler with the ability to generate great pace". Asif did relatively well picking up 25 wickets in 7 first-class games before leaving to join the Pakistan squad for their tour of England. Asif was due to line up again with Leicestershire for the 2007 season but due to injury problems was asked not to play by the PCB.

Asif missed the first three Tests in Pakistan's tour to England in the summer of 2006, but returned to the team for the fourth Test and immediately made an impact, picking up four wickets (Andrew Strauss, Alastair Cook, Paul Collingwood and Kevin Pietersen) in the first innings at the Oval, and another in the second (Marcus Trescothick).

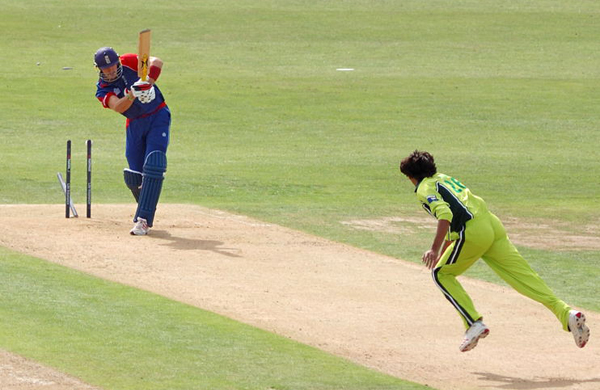
Asif bowls Pietersen for a duck

He became the first bowler to bowl a maiden over in Twenty20 cricket. Additionally, he picked up two wickets during the over, with the first being Kevin Pietersen for a golden duck and the second being Andrew Strauss, also without scoring. Kevin Pietersen remembers Asif's spell and recently in talking with Twitter wrote "I think there’s plenty batters around the world that were happy he got banned! He was the best I faced! I had no idea against him!"

Asif claimed 19 wickets abroad in Pakistan's test series against South Africa in 2007. This feat lifted him to eighth in the LG ICC Test player rankings after only nine appearances – equalling the record for the fewest matches taken by a Pakistan bowler to reach the top 10, shared by Waqar Younis and Pervez Sajjad. His spell was of 5 for 76 named as the third-best Test bowling performance of the year by ESPNcricinfo voters.

Following the 2–1 test series loss against South Africa, Pakistan captain Inzamam-Ul-Haq praised Asif's performance, "Asif has immaculate length control and a natural ability to swing the ball both ways. He is also quick to spot a weakness in batsmen and work on it." Pakistan coach Bob Woolmer added, "He [Asif] is a modern-day fast bowler based on the likes of [Shaun] Pollock and [Glenn] McGrath. He gives you control and has the ability to hit the seam and make the ball move both ways. In Pakistan terms he is more Sarfraz Nawaz than Imran Khan.

For his performances in 2007, he was named in the World Test XI by ICC.

Former Pakistan captain Imran Khan agreed with the assessment of Asif's progress, saying: "Asif is well on his way to become one of the greats. If he gains a little bit of pace through weight training he can be more lethal."

In August 2007, he joined the Indian Premier League (IPL) He was subsequently drafted by the Delhi DareDevils for US$650,000. In the week before the 2007 Twenty20 world cup match in South Africa, Shoaib Akhtar was rumoured to have hit Asif with a bat, leaving a bruise on his left thigh. According to sources, the two were involved in a dressing room spat which resulted in Asif being struck by a bat on his left thigh. Sources said the fight between the two started after Asif and Shahid Afridi disagreed with Shoaib that he shared the same stature as Imran Khan in Pakistan cricket and even ridiculed him for making such a comparison. The injury was not thought to be anything more serious than a bruise but a team investigation into the matter was pending. After the initial inquiry, it would found that Shoaib was at fault and he was subsequently recalled from the Twenty20 World Cup squad and was sent home. He was also banned for 5 matches by the PCB and a lifetime ban may also seem imminent. Akhtar later claimed that Afridi was responsible for the fight, saying "He made some ill remarks about my family. And I could not tolerate them" Afridi however, denied these allegations adding that Asif would have suffered more injuries but for his intervention. Even Asif chipped in saying that Shoaib was lying and that "Shahid Afridi had nothing to do with the fight." saying that "he has not apologised to me." His spell of 4 for 18 was named as the second-best T20I bowling performance of the year by ESPNcricinfo voters.

Conversely, Asif jointly holds the Test record with five consecutive ducks, an unfortunate honour he shares with Bob Holland and Ajit Agarkar.

In a September 2011 interview, Mohammad Asif praised his club captain, coach and close friend Mohammad Haroon (cricketer), stating that Haroon identified his potential early in his career and supported him consistently—even during his time in international cricket. Asif described regularly seeking Haroon's advice and credited his coaching insights as instrumental in his development.

== Film career ==
Asif was signed for his first acting role for a Malayalam film in 2010, however, he was dropped due to the allegations against him. He was eventually replaced by Pakistani-Canadian actor Abbas Hasan in Mazhavillinattam Vare directed by Kaithapram Damodaran Namboothiri.

== Controversies ==
=== Performance-enhancing drugs ===
On 16 October 2006, Asif was suspended by the PCB along with teammate Shoaib Akhtar, and was pulled from the Champions Trophy after the pair failed drug tests for the performance-enhancing substance Nandrolone.

England batsman Andrew Strauss said the news had rocked cricket. Speaking on BBC Radio 5 Live, he said: "When drugs are used in any sport it is not a great day for that sport and this not a great day for cricket."

On 1 November 2006, the PCB handed down a two-year suspension to Shoaib Akhtar and a one-year suspension to Asif, banning them from professional cricket for the duration. Both Asif and Shoaib have been added to Pakistan Olympic Association list of doping offenders. The tribunal set to investigate steroid use revealed that Asif had been using a protein supplement, Promax-50. The panel had reported to have shown a degree of leniency to Asif as they believe that he did not understand what he was taking and stopped at the request of the physiotherapist. Both Akhtar and Asif appealed against the ban. A second tribunal was formed. On 5 December both were acquitted by the tribunal appointed to review their drug ban appeal. The decision was made two to one with Hasib Ahsan and Justice Fakhruddin Ebrahim in favour of the acquittal. Statement by Justice Ebrahim: "This appeal committee [therefore] holds that Shoaib Akhtar and Mohammad Asif will not be deemed to have committed a doping offence," Ibrahim said. "The ban and punishment imposed by the earlier tribunal is hereby set aside as being contrary to the provision of laws."

However, the WADA, World Anti-Doping Agency was unhappy with the decision and was to challenge the decision to lift the bans on the fast bowlers, and taking the case to the Court of Arbitration for Sport in Lausanne, Switzerland. The ICC, cricket's world governing body, has supported the WADA appeal adding that it was committed to a dope free game.

On 6 December 2006, Asif spoke out in his defence in an interview with the BBC. When asked to explain the presence of Nandrolone in his body, Asif cited a lack of awareness in Asian countries and said that he had taken some vitamins and protein supplements during the team's 2006 tour of England, which led to the problem. He also mentioned that medicines are easier to obtain in Pakistan, with little information available about the quality of the medicines.

On 1 March 2007, Akhtar and Asif were ruled out of the Pakistani squad for the 2007 Cricket World Cup by team officials, minutes before the squad was to depart for the West Indies. The team management along with the PCB said their injuries were too severe to risk taking them to the Caribbean. Since neither of the two had been declared fit they had not undergone official doping tests. However, Pakistani officials told cricket sources off the record that the team management had feared that they would fail the doping tests as it was likely traces of Nandrolone were still present in their system.

However, on 2 July 2007, the Court of Arbitration for Sport later dropped the case, ruling it had no jurisdiction to challenge the decision made by PCB.

On 1 June 2008, Asif was detained at Dubai International Airport on suspicion of possessing illegal drugs. An unknown substance was found in Asif's wallet, and was sent for analysis along with a sample of Asif's urine. The PCB appointed a legal counsel to represent Asif, and sent a senior board official to Dubai to handle the case. Asif was withdrawn from Pakistan's squad for the upcoming tri-series in Bangladesh and replaced by newcomer Sohail Khan.

On 19 June 2008, the charges against Asif were dropped by the Dubai public prosecutor due to "insignificance." The prosecutor, Mohammad Al Nuaimi, was quoted as saying, "It is definite that he committed the crime as he was caught red-handed ... however in certain cases and for a faster litigation process the Public Prosecution drops a case due to insignificance and deports the suspect."He was banned from entering UAE ever again. Asif returned to Pakistan the following day and thanked those who had aided his release, he also stated, "I did not use any banned substance. During the Indian Premier League, I underwent two doping tests, and cleared both of them...If I had been tested positive, the ICC would not have cleared me." His alleged aiders include the Pakistani actress, Veena Malik, who recently claimed that Asif has not returned her loan amounting to PKR 13 million, which was used for his release.

In July 2008, soon after his return to Pakistan from Dubai, the IPL revealed that a player had tested positive for banned substances during the tournament and on 14 July, it was revealed that the player in question was Asif.

Asif protested his innocence, and his lawyer announced that his 'B' sample would be analysed as per WADA regulations, and he was later suspended from all cricket indefinitely by the PCB. He does have the right to appeal his suspension. On 11 February 2009, the IPL confirmed that Asif had tested positive for steroids and subsequently imposed a one-year ban on him, ending on 21 September 2009. Shortly before the IPL's announcement, Asif was released of his contract by the Delhi DareDevils.

=== Spot fixing scandal and seven-year ban ===
In August 2010, the English Sunday newspaper News of the World published allegations that Asif and fellow bowler Mohammad Amir had deliberately bowled no-balls during Pakistan's 2010 tour of England in return for payment from a betting syndicate, a practice known as spot-fixing.

On 1 September 2010, after the warm-up List A game between Pakistan and Somerset, the International Cricket Council announced that they had suspended Asif under the provisions of the ICC's Anti-Corruption Code. The statement from the ICC stated that the three players (Asif, Mohammad Amir and Salman Butt) were charged "under various offences under Article 2 of the ICC Anti-Corruption Code for Players and Player Support Personnel relating to alleged irregular behaviour during, and in relation to, the fourth Test between England and Pakistan at Lord's last month".

After filing his appeal against the suspension he withdrew it stating that he wanted the Scotland Yard investigation to be completed before he files an appeal against his ban as he knows what the charges levelled against him are In December Salman Butt one of the three cricketers implicated along with Asif and Amir announced that he wanted his hearing to be delayed because he wanted the Scotland Yard investigation to be completed first. Asif and Amir stated they would not take part in the teleconference involving Butt for requesting the delay in the hearing because they wanted their decisions to happen quickly so that they could be selected in Pakistan's provisional world cup squad

On 5 February 2011, the tribunal's decision was handed down. Asif was found guilty of deliberately bowling no-balls, and was banned from the sport of cricket for seven years, the last two of which were suspended should no further offences take place, and Asif take part in a Pakistani Cricket Board anti-corruption program.

On 1 November 2011, Asif was convicted at Southwark Crown Court, along with Amir and Butt, of conspiracy to cheat at gambling and conspiracy to accept corrupt payments.

On 3 May 2012, Asif completed his punishment and was released from HM Prison Canterbury, England.

== See also ==
- List of cricketers banned for match fixing
