= Marriage Da Garriage =

2014 film by Jasvinder Singh

Marriage da Garriage
- Directed by: Jaswinder Singh
- Screenplay by: Farook-Shardul, Gaurav Bhalla & Jaswinder Singh
- Story by: Farook Sayed & Shardul Rathod
- Starring: Navraj Hans; Keeya khanna Jaswinder Bhalla; B.N. Sharma; Shakti Kapoor; Upasana Singh
- Cinematography: Nanni Gill
- Music by: Gurmeet Singh
- Production company: 30TY Group Productions
- Distributed by: White Hill Studios
- Release date: 28 March 2014
- Country: India
- Language: Punjabi

Marriage Da Garriage is a Punjabi romantic comedy film directed by Jaswinder Singh, Starring Navraj Hans, Keeya Khanna, Jaswinder Bhalla and more. The movie was produced under the banner 30 TY Group Productions. Marriage da garriage is the debut movie of famous singer Hans Raj Hans's son Navraj Hans The film's Music was done Gurmeet Singh. Marriage Da Garriage was released on 28 March 2014.

== Cast ==
- Navraj Hans as Raaj
- Keeya khanna as Simran
- Jaswinder Bhalla as Chaabi
- B.N. Sharma as Pana
- Shakti Kapoor as Baldev
- Upasana Singh as Sheela
- Razzak Khan as Takkar Don
- Deepak Raja as Karan
- Amritpal Chotu as V.C.
- Rana Jang Bahadur as Pindha Singh
- Sukhbir Razia as Sukh
- Harby Sangha as Vela Don
