= Yash Narvekar =

Indian playback singer

- Occupation: singer
- Known for: "Mere Dil Mein" from Half Girlfriend (2017); Bahen Hogi Teri (2017); Noor (2017); The Remix (TV series)(2018)

Yash Narvekar is an Indian playback singer, composer and lyricist who has written and sung "Mere Dil Mein" in the film Half Girlfriend, "Teri Yaadon Mein" in Behen Hogi Teri, and "Gulabi 2.0" in Noor among a number of popular songs. He won Maharashtra State Film Award for Best Male Playback Singer for film Pak Pak Pakaak.

== Career ==
Yash was given a break by Mohit Suri from EMI Records India, where he was trained. Yash is a frequent collaborator with music producer Rishi Rich. He was a participant in The Remix on Amazon Prime Video.

== Discography ==
Year	Work	Song	Co-singer(s)	Composer	Lyrics
2017	Half Girlfriend	"Mere Dil Mein"	Veronica Mehta	Rishi Rich	Veronica Mehta, R. Rekhi, Yash Anand, Yash Narvekar
2017	Bahen Hogi Teri	"Teri Yaadon Mein"	Shubhanshu Kesarwani, Pawni Pandey, Yasser Desai	Yash Narvekar	Yash Narvekar, Amit Dhanani
2017	Bahen Hogi Teri	"Teri Yaadon Mein (Reprise)"	Pawni Pandey	Yash Narvekar	Yash Narvekar, Amit Dhanani
2017	Noor	"Gulabi 2.0"	Tulsi Kumar, Amaal Mallik, Yasser Desai	Amaal Mallik	Manoj Muntashir
2017	Noor	"Gulabi Redux"	Tulsi Kumar	Amaal Mallik	Manoj Muntashir
2017	Mubarakan	"Title Track"	Sukriti Kakar, Badshah and Juggy D	Rishi Rich	Rishi Rich, Yash Anand
2017	Poster Boys	"Kehndi Menoo"	Sukriti Kakar, Ikka Singh	Rishi Rich	Kumaar
2019	Marjaavaan	"Ek Toh Kum Zindagani"	Neha Kakkar	Tanishk Bagchi	Tanishk Bagchi, A. M. Turaz
2020	Street Dancer 3D	"Muqabla"	Parampara Tandon	Tanishk Bagchi	Tanishk Bagchi, Shabbir Ahmed
2020	Street Dancer 3D	Muqabla (Tamil)	Parampara Tandon	Tanishk Bagchi	Veeramani Kannan
2020	Street Dancer 3D	Muqabla (Telugu)	Parampara Tandon	Tanishk Bagchi	Ramajogayya Sastry
2022	Dhokha: Round D Corner	"Mere Dil Gaaye Ja (Zooby Zooby)"	Zahrah S Khan	Tanishk Bagchi	Kumaar
2024	Ghudchadi	"Punjabi Munde"	Tulsi Kumar, Sukhbir, Priyani Vani	Sukhbir, DJ Chetas-Lijo George	Sukhbir, Yash Narvekar, Lijo George

=== Other songs as vocalist ===
Year	Album	Song	Singer(s)	Co-writer(s)	Music
2016	Diamond Jewel (Remixes)	"Diamond Jewel (Rishi Rich Remix)"	Mumzy Stranger	Mumzy Stranger, Yogesh Kalia, Himself	Lyan Roze, Rishi Rich
