= Kamlesh Gill =

Indian actress of Hindi films (born 1937)

- Born: 4 April 1937 (age 89); India
- Occupation: actor
- Years active: 2005–present

Kamlesh Gill is an Indian actress of Hindi films, best known for the films Vicky Donor (2012), Bang Bang! (2014) and PK (2014).

She was nominated for Screen Award for Best Comedian and Zee Cine Award for Best Supporting Actress for her performance in Vicky Donor.

== Filmography ==
Year	Film	Role(s)
2005	Socha Na Tha	Grandma
2008	Oye Lucky! Lucky Oye!	Old Woman
2008	Love Aaj Kal	Harleen's Grandmother
2012	Vicky Donor	Biji
2013	Bajatey Raho	Guest Appearance
2014	Bang Bang!	Dadi
2014	PK	Guest Appearance
2015	Bajrangi Bhaijaan	Special Appearance
2015	Shaandaar	Special Appearance
2016-19	The Aam Aadmi Family	Dadi (17 episodes; TVF series)
2017	Behen Hogi Teri	Dadi
2018	Veere Di Wedding	Dadi
2020	Shimla Mirchi	Dadi
2020	Bhangra Paa Le	Nimmo's Grandmother
2020	Gul Makai	Malala's Grandmother
2020	Jawaani Jaaneman	Mrs. Malika
2021	The White Tiger	Granny
