= Bhangra Paa Le =

Indian Hindi-language comedy-drama film

- Theatrical release poster
- Directed by: Sneha Taurani
- Screenplay by: Dheeraj Rattan
- Story by: Dheeraj Rattan
- Produced by: Ronnie Screwvala
- Starring: Sunny Kaushal; Rukshar Dhillon; Shriya Pilgaonkar; Parmeet Sethi; Samir Soni; Chaitnya Sharma; Sheeba Chaddha; Jayati Bhatia; Akarsh Khurana; Kamlesh Gill
- Cinematography: Jitan Harmeet Singh
- Edited by: Antara Lahiri
- Music by: Songs: JAM8; Rishi Rich; Yash Narvekar; A Bazz; Score: Ketan Sodha
- Production company: RSVP Movies
- Distributed by: Tips Industries
- Release date: 3 January 2020
- Country: India
- Box office: est. ₹0.52 crore

Bhangra Paa Le (transl. Let's do the Bhangra) is a 2020 Indian Hindi-language comedy-drama film, directed by Sneha Taurani and produced by Ronnie Screwvala. It stars Sunny Kaushal and Rukshar Dhillon. Initially planned to release on 13 September 2019 and then 1 November 2019, it was theatrically released in India on 3 January 2020.

== Plot ==
Set in Amritsar, the movie narrates the story of two generations.

Kaptaan, the grandfather of the protagonist Jaggi Singh, is a former army soldier whose passion is Bhangra. He continues to perform Bhangra after being recruited in the army. On the battlefield as well, he motivates his comrades to get up by beating a drum and performing Bhangra. Unfortunately, Kaptaan loses a leg in the war, and feels dejected and refuses to go home. Back home, Nimmo, the girl he loves, is about to get married.

Kaptaan had met Nimmo at a neighbouring wedding and wooed her family by performing Bhangra in the duel. Her brothers order Kaptaan to come ask for Nimmo's hand after the war, but as he fails to come, they arrange her alliance elsewhere.

In the camp, Kaptaan's comrades cheer him up by beating the drum, and motivate him to return home. He goes to Nimmo's house in the middle of her wedding preparations, and dances on one leg to woo her family again. Nimmo enters with the drum and provides him with support, and the family agrees to their wedding.

In the present, Jaggi Singh is a Bhangra aspirant from Khalsa college who wants Bhangra to make it big in the world. Kaptaan is Jaggi's idol, and he believes that in order to perform the main move in Bhangra, the "jhoomar", one has to be in love. He meets Simi Kohli in a wedding and they immediately hit it off. Later, they find out they are from rival colleges Khalsa and GNDU, in the international Bhangra competition, and part ways. Both teams get through the semi-finals, and Jaggi and Simi come closer. Simi falls in love, and dances her heart out in the qualifier round, which leads to GNDU winning the ticket to the finals in London. The qualifier round results lead to a crowd clash between the two teams, and Jaggi gets injured in the leg while trying to break off the fights. Upset, Jaggi then ignores Simi, breaks it off with his team, and returns to his village, where he eventually reunites with the village Bhangra group, Pendu Club, run by his father.

Pendu Club starts making dance videos and enters the competition in London through crowdfunding. Both GNDU and Pendu Club are able to clear the semi-final rounds. Jaggi and Simi meet again, and spend time together near the London Eye. He tells her about Kaptaan and Nimmo, and she tells him about her father who had abandoned her, who she recently met in London. They grow closer. Later, in the final round, Jaggi finds his leg collapsing. Simi enters in the wings with a drum, motivating Jaggi to keep dancing. He also performs "jhoomar" with the same energy now, and Pendu Club wins the competition. Simi and Jaggi finally unite as lovers.

== Cast ==
- Sunny Kaushal as Jaggi and Kaptaan Singh
- Rukshar Dhillon as Simi Kohli
- Shriya Pilgaonkar as Nimmo
- Swasti Kapur as Kiran
- Sarthak Kakar as Pappi
- Parmeet Sethi as Jaggi's father
- Jayati Bhatia as Jaggi's mother
- Samir Soni as Simi's father
- Sheeba Chaddha as Geeta Kohli, Simi's mother
- Mahavir Bhullar as Kaptaan's father
- Seema Kaushal as Kaptaan's mother
- Kamlesh Gill as Nimmo's grandmother
- Naila Grewal as Heer
- Varun Narang as Bhangra competition judge
- Mark Bennington as Henderson
- Sunit Razdan as Subedar Karim

== Release ==
The film was scheduled to be released theatrically on 1 November 2019, but got delayed, and finally released in India on 3 January 2020. The film was later released on Netflix on 1 March 2020.

== Soundtrack ==
Bhangra Paa Le

Soundtrack album by JAM8, Rishi Rich, Yash Narvekar and A Bazz
- Released: 16 December 2019
- Recorded: 2019
- Genre: Feature film soundtrack
- Length: 38:43
- Language: Hindi
- Label: Tips Music
External audio
- Official Audio Jukebox on YouTube

The music of the film is composed by Shubham Shirule, Keeran, Aakashdeep Sengupta, Kaushik - Aakash - Guddu (KAG), Ana Rehman, Nilotpal Munshi, Kiranee for JAM8, Rishi Rich, Yash Narvekar and A Bazz with lyrics written by Shloke Lal, Kiranee, Shubham Shirule for JAM8, Siddhant Kaushal, Mandy Gill, Raftaar, Yash Narvekar, Manisha and A Bazz. The song "Bhangra Paa Le" is a remake of the song "Bhangra Paale" from the film Karan Arjun.

Track listing
No.	Title	Lyrics	Music	Singer(s)	Length
1.	"Bhangra Paa Le"	Mandy Gill	Shubham Shirule for JAM8	Mandy Gill	3:00
2.	"Kala Joda"	Shloke Lal, Raftaar, Manisha	Aakashdeep Sengupta for JAM8	Romy, Shalmali Kholgade, Manisha; Rap: Raftaar	3:07
3.	"Ho Ja Rangeela Re"	Yash Narvekar, Kiranee and Shloke Lal for Jam8	Rishi Rich, Yash Narvekar, Shubham Shirule & Kiranee for JAM8,	Shashwat Singh	3:09
4.	"Jhoomar Dhaaga"	Shubham Shirule, Mandy Gill	Shubham Shirule for JAM8	Mandy Gill	4:00
5.	"Re Sardar"	Shloke Lal for JAM8	Keeran for JAM8	Mandy Gill	3:18
6.	"Peg Sheg"	Shloke Lal for JAM8, A Bazz	Nilotpal Munshi for JAM8, A Bazz	Jonita Gandhi, Akasa Singh, Shashwat Singh, A Bazz	2:51
7.	"Sun Sajna"	Kiranee, Shloke Lal for JAM8	Rishi Rich, Yash Narvekar, Kiranee for JAM8,	Navraj Hans, Jonita Gandhi, Yash Narvekar, Kiranee	2:48
8.	"Angana"	Shloke Lal for JAM8	Ana Rehman for JAM8	Shreya Ghoshal, Javed Ali	5:26
9.	"Raanjhan"	Mandy Gill	Shubham Shirule for JAM8	Neeti Mohan, Tushar Joshi	3:46
10.	"Sacchiyaan"	Siddhant Kaushal	KAG for JAM8	Amit Mishra, Harshdeep Kaur	3:21
11.	"Ajj Mera Yaar"	Shloke Lal for JAM8	Shubham Shirule, Ana Rehman for JAM8	Amit Mishra	3:57
Total length:					38:43

== Reception ==
Shubhra Gupta of The Indian Express gave the 2 out of 5, calling it a "passable dance drama." Rahul Desai of Film Companion wrote, "In short, a malnourished Jo Jeeta Wohi Sikandar elopes with Rab Ne Bana Di Jodi but ends up having a quick and dirty shotgun wedding with Good Morning Vietnam instead. You can sense that the makers are trying too hard to convince us of a world in which a war of Bhangra – arguably the most globally recognized form of Indian dancing – is comparable to wartime love."
