= Juggy D (album) =

- Album Cover

Studio album by Juggy D
- Released: 12 October 2004
- Recorded: 2003–2004
- Genre: Bhangra; alternative hip-hop
- Label: 2Point9 Records
- Producer: Rishi Rich

Juggy D chronology
Juggy D (2004)	Juggy D 2: Punjabi Rockstar (2011)

Singles from Juggy D
- 1. "Sohniye" Released: 16 August 2004

Juggy D is the debut studio album by British Indian singer Juggy D. It was released on 12 October 2004 on 2Point9 Records. Produced by Mentor and Rishi Rich. The album is the first Punjabi language album ever to enter the UK official charts, peaking at number 70. The first single, Sohniye was released before, it received positive reviews from critics and was featured in the 2004 Bollywood film Shukriya: Till Death Do Us Apart.

Collaborators in the album are Rishi Rich, Jay Sean and Don Dee.

== Track listing ==
No.	Title	Producer(s)	Length
1.	"Sohniye" (featuring Rishi Rich)	Juggy D, Rishi Rich	3:57
2.	"Billo"	Rishi Rich	4:08
3.	"Come On (Aajana, Pt. 2)"	Rishi Rich	3:03
4.	"Nasheh"	Rishi Rich	3:44
5.	"Gabaru" (featuring Don Dee)	Rishi Rich	4:09
6.	"Broadway Skit"	Juggy D, Rishi Rich	0:31
7.	"Meri Jaan" (featuring Jay Sean)	Rishi Rich	4:21
8.	"Dil De Rani"	Rishi Rich	4:20
9.	"Akheer"	Rishi Rich	3:51
10.	"Nasheh (Remix)"	Rishi Rich	4:23
11.	"Sohniye (Remix)" (featuring Don Dee)	Rishi Rich	4:36
Total length:			41:03

== Charts ==
Chart (2004)	Peak position
UK Albums Chart	70
