= Abbas Hassan (disambiguation) =

Abbas Hassan is a footballer.

Abbas Hassan may also refer to:

- Abbas Al-Hassan, Saudi Arabian footballer
- Abbas Hassan Hassun, Iraqi footballer
- Abbas Hasan, Canadian artist
