= Badmashiyaan =

2015 film by Amit Khanna

- Directed by: Amit Khanna
- Written by: Kushal Ved Bakshi
- Produced by: Vijay Gutte
- Starring: Gunjan Malhotra; Karan Veer Mehra; Sharib Hashmi; Sidhant Gupta; Suzanna Mukherjee
- Cinematography: Perumal Vinu
- Edited by: Rahul Bhatnkar
- Music by: Bobby-Imran
- Production company: VRG Motion Pictures
- Release date: 6 March 2015
- Running time: 132 minutes
- Country: India
- Language: Hindi

Badmashiyaan (transl. Naughtiness) is a 2015 Hindi-language romantic comedy film. The film is released on 6 March 2015 to mixed reviews.

== Plot ==
The story starts off well, with a sweet Punjabi couple introducing the audience. The story then jumps to Chandigarh, in 2014, where a frustrated man, while conversing on phone, loses control of his car due to a basketball and instantly applies brakes thereby also causing a public transport bus to stop, when the couple are just beside each other and fall over, sprouting up the love that led to their marriage.

While the frustrated man stops, a local taxi-driver Gurinder jumps out of his taxi and begins creating a scene against the frustrated man, who is then revealed to be enterprising cafè owner Dev Arora, the owner of a very popular cafè known as Cafè Konnect. Gurinder and Dev part ways, clearing the crowd that had accumulated there.

A rewind back to a recent history shows Dev's past, when, one day while taking photographs of a cute young woman he saw playing with balloons in the midst of children, he ended up saving another woman, Naari and later took her to his cafè. Shortly after, the two entered a live-in relationship with Dev getting a huge loan following Dev's love instinct for Naari. However, despite a huge house and a big loan shark, Naari deserted Dev the very evening he wanted to propose to her during dinner at a five-star hotel on the pretext of using the washroom. Ever since that day, Dev did preserve Naari's belongings, but life for him has taken a back seat and he now has his hopes pinned on friend Pinkesh Kapoor, a part-time detective.

Back again to the foreground in the beginning, there is another typical Chandigarh couple which shares the first meet story. During their first meet, both the boy and the girl have a fight, particularly because the boy despises the girl's ambitions of being a fashion designer. However, the boy ends up unintentionally tearing off the back of the girl's designer gown-dress upon having slipped off a cherry ball on the floor which was being squashed by a man.

In comes another man, a fantastic character, Pinkesh, also nicknamed 'Pinku'. Initially a private detective, Pinku has had solved numerous cases, but the toughest case is that of Naari, since she is also one among his half-acquaintances. During the time when Dev was conversing on phone in the first scene, it was actually Pinku himself who was chasing Naari and also speaking to Dev. However, it is revealed that Pinku is also deeply infatuated with Naari, and has often supported her with cons. Also, it is unveiled that the person who tried to squash the cherry on the floor was also Pinku, who later chased Naari and found her, at last, with money belonging to her target. After a few more dozen moves, Naari left, leaving Pinku still undaunted. She later went to Dev's house to empty her belongings from the huge house.

Returning to Dev's life, the story shows him visiting the bank to mortgage another loan, but the bank is raided by robbers, and while dealing with a crisis, he meets Palak Mehra, the same girl he was capturing on his camera, who defends him against a haughty woman trying to falsely accuse him. The two get out, Dev thanks Palak, and asks Pinku to meet up at Velvet Lounge, a starry restaurant. Meanwhile, Palak's friend also arrives there, asking her to meet up at Vintage Lounge.

At night in Vintage Lounge, Palak's friend refuses to turn up, while Pinku and Dev do meet, but Pinku makes up a fake pretext of using the washroom and leaves Dev in the lurch, and Dev doesn't have money to pay. Meanwhile, Palak too does not have money to pay. However, they meet each other in a funny manner, with Palak perceiving him as a chicken-bait and Dev perceiving her as Goddess Lakshmi. Both have a fat meal, but when it comes to payment, Dev tokens away his car keys and Palak her ring, which she wanted to wear off after her fiancé left her.

Dev and Palak walk on foot to Dev's house where she admires its scenic beauty. Palak asks to change her clothes and occupies Naari's room. Naari turns up at that moment, when Dev asks her to empty her room else he will throw away everything in her room. Palak returns, notices Naari and condemns her and soon takes a taxi.

It is further revealed that when Dev had phoned him to reach Vintage Lounge, Pinku was at Dev's house, hidden away in the bathroom since he was helping Naari procure her passport and bags before she could leave.

A rewind back to Pinku's escape from Vintage Lounge reveals the character who had been narrating the story all this time : Haryanvi Don Jassi Chaudhary. It is revealed that while Pinku was chasing Naari in the five-star hotel, the latter was with Jassi. The same night when she ditched Dev, she met Jassi, who fell head over heels for her, and while he sang the lovebird songs, Naari eyed some lettuce which Jassi was supposed to give away to a local lord. A reformed gangster, Jassi, who, till then, was into a decent business, began suspecting Pinku of a false move and later discovered that it was he who had Naari escape.

Actually, it is further revealed that the money which Naari stole from Jassi comprised counterfeit notes, which she ferried in a bag. While Dev reached home with Palak that night, Naari hid herself behind a tree, and simultaneously, Jassi and his men also succeeded in spotting Naari. While she occupied Naari's room, Palak didn't literally freshen herself, but instead noticed the bag and unknowingly stuffed the cash bundles into her bag and purse, thinking she might get a government bank job for which her private banking firm demanded a bribe. Naari rushes into her room after Palak leaves, but is devastated to find her bag empty, whereafter she notices Jassi, who forgives her and confesses his love for her. Naari realizes her mistake and reunites with Jassi. Meanwhile, Dev chases Palak, who is in a taxi, which is driven by Gurinder himself, and succeeds in earning her attention and affection. He starts dancing and an SUV car stops. He steps aside, the car leaves, and he starts dancing again, little knowing that Jassi and Naari were in the SUV.

Presently, Pinku, who was actually spared by Jassi's men whose entry into Velvet Lounge in his search offered Pinku the prerogative of escaping, is at Dev's house, lifting dumbbells and advising Dev against another rendezvous with Palak. While the two meet, they confess love for each other, and find hilariously that they had been running after fake bundles of cash!

The story returns to the same foreground in the beginning, where Dev and Palak have a one-on-one meet with the audience as a married couple. Jassi also stars here, revealing that Naari has now turned over a new leaf as a networking employee.

== Cast ==
- Sharib Hashmi as Jassi Chaudhary
- Suzanna Mukherjee as Naari
- Sidhant Gupta as Dev Arora
- Karan Veer Mehra as Pinkesh 'Pinky' Kapoor
- Gunjan Malhotra as Palak Mehra
- Anil Mange as Gurinder, taxi driver

== Soundtrack ==
The music was composed by Bobby-Imran and lyrics penned by Shabbir Ahmed. The album comprises 7 songs.

Badmashiyaan Soundtrack
No.	Title	Singer(s)	Length
1.	"Shaitaaniyan"	Ankit Tiwari	04:19
2.	"Thode Se Hum"	Mohit Chauhan	05:54
3.	"Garden Garden Gave"	Mika Singh, Jaspreet Jasz	03:57
4.	"Kudiyan Baimaan"	Manish J. Tipu	04:47
5.	"Thode Se Hum (Encore)"	Shilpa Rao	04:24
6.	"Shaitaaniyan (Encore)"	Anupam Amod	03:54
7.	"Mashup"	DJ Kiran Kamath	03:42
