= Parbat Ke Us Paar =

- Directed by: Raman Kumar
- Starring: Rakesh Bedi; Abhinav Chaturvedi; Avtar Gill; Bharat Kapoor; Deepak Tijori; Yunus Parvez; Lubna Salim
- Music by: Khayyam
- Release date: 2 September 1988
- Country: India
- Language: Hindi

Parbat Ke Us Paar is a 1988 Indian Hindi language romance film directed by Raman Kumar. The film's music was composed by Khayyam.

== Cast ==
- Abhinav Chaturvedi as Shadab Khan
- Deepak Tijori as Shadab's friend
- Manju Mishra as Veena
- Rama Vij as Aaazra, Bland
- Lubna Salim as Shabana
- Rakesh Bedi as Dhol
- Bharat Kapoor as Bland Khan
- Avtar Gill as Malik Mohammed
- Yunus Parvez as Munshi Tarachand
- Vikas Anand as Qawwali Singer Mohan Kumar

== Soundtrack ==
No.	Title	Singer(s)	Length
1.	"Maine Zameen Par Chand Ko"	Anwar
2.	"Sehre Ki Ladiyan"	Shabbir Kumar
3.	"Parbat Ke Us Paar"	Suresh Wadkar
4.	"Kaisa Hai Tere Ishq Mein Deewana Dekh Le"	Suresh Wadkar, Anup Jalota
5.	"Aaja Ke Meri Jaan Ko Karaar Nahin Hai"	Asha Bhosle, Mohammed Aziz
6.	"Aaja Ranjhan Yaara Aaja, Aaja O Dildaara Aaja" (Happy)	Asha Bhosle, Mohammed Aziz
7.	"Ishqe Di Dor Na Toote"	Asha Bhosle, Mohammed Aziz
8.	"Deke Pyar Diye Kyo Rabba"	Parvati Khan
