= Pakistani cricket team in Sri Lanka in 2005–06 =

The Pakistan national cricket team toured Sri Lanka in March and April 2006 to play two Test matches and three ODIs. Pakistan won both the Test series and the ODI series.

== Test series summary ==
Pakistan won the Test series 1–0, with 1 match drawn.

=== First Test ===
26–30 March 2006
(5-day match)
Scorecard

Sri Lanka	v	Pakistan
185 (57.5 overs); TM Dilshan 69 (106); Mohammad Asif 4/41 (16 overs)		176 (54.4 overs); Imran Farhat 69 (90); MF Maharoof 4/52 (15 overs)
448/5d (128 overs); KC Sangakkara 185 (326); Mohammad Asif 2/71 (23 overs)		337/4 (121 overs); Shoaib Malik 148* (369); M Muralitharan 3/94 (42 overs)

Match drawn
Sinhalese Sports Club Ground, Colombo
Umpires: SJ Davis (AUS) and RE Koertzen (SA)
Player of the match: KC Sangakkara (SL)

- Pakistan won the toss and elected to field.
- There was no play on the first day.

=== Second Test ===
3–5 April 2006
(5-day match)
Scorecard

Sri Lanka	v	Pakistan
279 (91.2 overs); KC Sangakkara 79 (98); Mohammad Asif 6/44 (23 overs)		170 (52.4 overs); Younis Khan 35 (57); M Muralitharan 5/39 (16.4 overs)
73 (24.5 overs); KC Sangakkara 16 (31); Mohammad Asif 5/27 (12 overs)		183/2 (43.2 overs); Younis Khan 73* (98); SL Malinga 1/33 (6.2 overs)

Pakistan won by 8 wickets
Asgiriya Stadium, Kandy
Umpires: SJ Davis (AUS) and DJ Harper (AUS)
Player of the match: Mohammad Asif (PAK)

- Pakistan won the toss and elected to field.
- The match was scheduled for five days but completed in three.
- Iftikhar Anjum (PAK) made his Test debut.

== ODI series ==
Pakistan won the three-match ODI series 2–0 with 1st ODI match abandoned due to rain.

=== 1st ODI ===
17 March 2006 (D/N)
Scorecard

Pakistan; 201/8 (50 overs)	v	Sri Lanka
Mohammad Yousuf 46 (76); Farveez Maharoof 3/24 (10 overs)

No Result
R Premadasa Stadium, Colombo
Umpires: Asoka de Silva (SRI) and Steve Davis (AUS)

- Sri Lanka won the toss and elected to field.

=== 2nd ODI ===
19 March 2006
Scorecard

Sri Lanka; 130 (44.2 overs)	v	Pakistan; 134/6 (44.4 overs)
Tillakaratne Dilshan 48* (75); Naved-ul-Hasan 3/23 (6.2 overs)		Abdul Razzaq 41* (101); Lasith Malinga 2/22 (9 overs)

Pakistan won by 4 wickets
R Premadasa Stadium, Colombo
Umpires: Steve Davis (AUS) and Tyron Wijewardene (SRI)
Player of the match: Abdul Razzaq (PAK)

- Pakistan won the toss and elected to field.

=== 3rd ODI ===
22 March 2006
Scorecard

Sri Lanka; 224 (49.4 overs)	v	Pakistan; 229/6 (45.2 overs)
Chamara Kapugedera 50 (74); Shahid Afridi 3/37 (10 overs)		Mohammad Yousuf 53 (73); Muttiah Muralitharan 3/58 (10 overs)

Pakistan won by 4 wickets
Sinhalese Sports Club Ground, Colombo
Umpires: Asoka de Silva (SRI) and Steve Davis (AUS)
Player of the match: Shahid Afridi (PAK)

- Pakistan won the toss and elected to field.
