= Chal Bhaag =

- Movie poster
- Directed by: Prakash Balwant Saini
- Written by: Tarun Bajaj
- Produced by: Mohammad Zaheer Mehdi; Fatima Zaheer Mehdi; Ali Ghadeer Mehdi; Tamkanat Ali Mehdi
- Starring: Deepak Dobriyal; Keeya Khanna; Sanjay Mishra (actor); Yashpal Sharma; Mukesh Tiwari
- Cinematography: Sameer Bhaskar
- Edited by: Hardik Singh Reen
- Music by: Satish Kashyap; Sadhu Sushil Tiwari; Sanjay Pathak; Satendra Riwari
- Release date: 13 June 2014
- Running time: 1 hour 53 minutes
- Country: India
- Language: Hindi

Chal Bhaag is a 2014 Indian Hindi-language action-comedy movie directed by Prakash Saini and presented under the banner of Alimoh Films. It was produced by Mohammad Zaheer Mehdi, Fatima Zaheer Mehdi, Ali Mehdi and Tamkanat Ali Mehdi. It starred Deepak Dobriyal, Keeya Khanna, Sanjay Mishra, Yashpal Sharma, Mukesh Tiwari among others and was released on 13 June 2014. It was written by Tarun Bajaj, who also acted in the movie.

== Plot ==
This film starts with an ex-MLA shot dead by three unknown men likely belonging to a dangerous gangster group in Delhi. His death shocked the entire nation, and due to media's pressure, police are desperate to arrest the gunmen and close the case.

However, all police officers in the police station are corrupted and have connections with gangster groups. Being ordered to close the case within 24 hours, police chief Ramlal decides to find three scapegoats to blame for the MLA's shooting, and shoot them to make it like an encounter, leaving them no chance to clarify themselves. Ramlal and his men choose three detained criminals for minor crimes in the police station: Daler Singh, a kind-hearted and brave man who was arrested for fighting with some goons who were teasing a woman, Bunty, who was arrested for theft, and Munna Supari, a junior member of Usmaan's gang, who was arrested for harassing police when drunk.

Police drive the three chosen scapegoats in a midnight to a remote forest, preparing to shoot them there. However, before shooting, Ramlal's gun gets stuck, and he then accidentally shoots someone in a distance. To everyone's shock, the shot one is Usmaan, a famous don who has long bribed and been sheltered by him. The three scapegoats escape during the chaos.

Fearful of vengeance by Usmaan's brother Mannul, Ramlal tells him that the three shot Usmaan. Mannul orders his men and police to find the three "murderers", alive or dead. The three are now on the run from both cops and Mannul's men.

They visit Kajri's place for shelter, a club dancer who is Munna's friend and who also happens to be the girl Daler was always in love with. After learning their story, Kajri decides to help them. She drives them to the train station and asks them to catch the earliest train to Mumbai and never come back to Delhi. However, Kajri's boss Tata Singh betrayed them after knowing the three are wanted by Mannul with Rs 7.5 million. Tata tells Mannul the three's whereabouts.

When waiting for the train, Bunty accidentally finds there's a sim-card and a micro-camera in a necklace he stole from Usmaan's man in the police station. Curious about why the sim-card, he installs it in his own phone. As soon as he installs it, Intelligence Bureau is informed that the sim-card is activated. It is revealed that the IB officers planted the sim-card and the camera in the necklace to locate Usmaan's men and collect evidence against them.

Mannul and Ramlal's men arrive at the train station before the three board the train, and chase them. But before they get them, IB agents, who have more power than Ramlal's police station, arrive and arrest the three. In the IB, they submitted the camera containing evidence against Usmaan, Mannul, and Ramlal's connection with them, having them all arrested. The three are therefore released for their finding.

== Cast ==
- Deepak Dobriyal as Munna Supari
- Keeya Khanna as Kajari
- Sanjay Mishra as Tata Singh
- Yashpal Sharma as Satyapal Sharma
- Mukesh Tiwari as Kishan
- Vinod Nahardih as Tyagi Don
- Varun Mehra as Daler Singh
- Tarun Bajaj as Bunty
- Atul Srivastava as Ramlal
- Manish Khanna as Mamool
- Kunwar Aziz as Usmaan
- Shehzad Khan

== Soundtrack ==
The music for Chal Bhaag is composed by Satish Kashyap, Sadhu Sushil Tiwari and Sanjay Pathak.

=== Track listing ===
No.	Title	Lyrics	Music	Artist(s)	Length
1.	"Teri Maujudgi(Male)"	Niket Pandey	Satish Kashyap	Javed Ali	04:53
2.	"Madam Ji"	Niket Pandey, Dr. Devendra Kafir	Sadhu Sushil Tiwari	Geet Sagar, Ritu Pathak, Sadhu Sushil Tiwari	03:55
3.	"Daba Kar Dum Doggy Bhage Re"	Niket Pandey	Sadhu Sushil Tiwari	Ritu Pathak, Sadhu Sushil Tiwari	03:10
4.	"Ras Bhari Bhari"	Prita S. Pathak	Sanjay Pathak	Tarannum Malik	05:07
5.	"Teri Maujudgi(Female)"	Niket Pandey	Satish Kashyap	Khushboo Jain	01:38
Total length:					18:43

== Critical reception ==
The Times of India gave the film 2 stars and wrote "While the motive and twists in the story are interesting, the comic execution ruins it and the film would have still worked had it been a black comedy."

Bollywood Hungama gave 1.5 stars writing "The film has an interesting premise, but the director doesn't have the grip on the plot and it shows in the film." The performance of Deepak Dobriyal was particularly praised.

Faheem Ruhani from India Today gave 1.5 stars and wrote "Chal Bhaag's got a poorly written screenplay, amateur production design, shoddy performances, listless dialogues and useless item songs which play out as and when the director fancies."

Rahul Desai from Mumbai Mirror criticised the film heavily and gave 1.5 stars. He wrote that the film was awfully executed and the makers got the basics and technicalities all wrong.

The film got appreciation only from IndiaGlitz, achieving a rating of 3 stars. Vishal Verma praised the director and most of the actors. However, he opined that the director should have come to the point earlier, without taking much time to establish the characters.
