= Ritu Pathak =

Indian playback singer (born 1987)

- Born: 4 September 1987 (age 39); Seoni, Madhya Pradesh, India
- Origin: Seoni, Madhya Pradesh
- Genres: classical, pop, filmi
- Occupation: Playback singer
- Years active: 2010–present

Ritu Pathak (born 4 September 1987) is a Bollywood playback singer. Born in Gopalganj, India, she rose to fame after participating in the second season of Indian Idol. She was one of the finalists in another TV music talent show, Fame X. She has recorded numerous songs with many prominent composers, such as Shankar–Ehsaan–Loy, Sajid–Wajid and Anand Raj Anand.

== Early life ==
Pathak was born in a village in Gopalganj, Seoni Madhya Pradesh. Her father was a singer who performed at local orchestras and small gatherings. She was encouraged by him to pursue a career in music and he used to take her to participate in reality singing shows. She got her first vocal lessons in Nagpur and she received Hindustani classical vocal training from Sangit Mahabharti.

== Career ==
Pathak participated in singing talent show Fame X on the suggestion of Sonia Rao, who was a judge on the show. She gained recognition from her performance in the show; and afterwards met Anand Raj Anand and began singing scratches for presentations.

In 2010, Pathak met Shankar–Ehsaan–Loy who selected her to sing the Papa Jag Jaayega, for the film Housefull. After that, she worked with composer Pritam Chakraborty to sing the song Razia Gundo Mein Phans Gayi from film Thank You and other songs from Hello Darling and Action Replayy. She went on to work with Anand Raj Anand to sing Jalebi Bai for the filmDouble Dhamaal, which is one of her most popular songs to date.

Pathak has also worked with Sajid–Wajid in many songs, such as Radha Nachegi in Tevar.

Pathak has sung playback for the actress Sonakshi Sinha on many occasions, such as in the song Gandi Baat from R. Rajkumar.

Pathak has also sung Lip to Lip (from Katti Batti), DJ Bajega To Pappu Nachega (from Kis Kisko Pyaar Karoon) Cinema Dekhe Mamma (from Singh Is Bliing). Having worked with so many composers, she wishes to sing for the maestro A. R. Rahman one day.

In 2012, Pathak hosted the show ‘Retrospective Special’ which was broadcast on DD1 which features interesting trivia about movies from the golden era. She has performed in live shows in numerous events in Delhi, Mumbai, Bengaluru, Raipur, Udaipur and other major Indian cities. She has also performed in Poland, Muscat, Rangoon, Kathmandu and Malaysia and China. She toured to Australia & Fiji Island with Johnny Lever, Priyanka Chopra & Abhijeet Sawant. In 2007, she did a show in Israel with Johnny Lever.

Pathak was nominated in the Stardust Awards in 2012 for the category New Musical Sensation - Female for the song Jalebi Bai in the film Double Dhamaal).

== Discography ==
=== Bollywood ===
Year	Song	Film	Co-singer(s)
2025	"Housefull 5 Mixtape"	Housefull 5	Shankar–Ehsaan–Loy, Sajid–Wajid, Julius Packiam
2019	Peeyu Datt Ke	Marjaavaan	Yo Yo Honey Singh
2017	Rocket Saiyaan	Shubh Mangal Saavdhan	Vayu
2016	Hor Nach	Mastizaade	Meet Bros Anjjan
2015	Dimaagh Ka Dahi	Hogaya Dimaagh Ka Dahi	Kunal Ganjawala
2015	Cinema Dekhe Mamma	Singh Is Bliing	Shaan, Wajid Ali
2015	DJ Bajega To Pappu Nachega	Kis Kisko Pyaar Karoon	Wajid, Shalmali Kholgade
2015	Lip To Lip	Katti Batti	Nikhil D'Souza
2015	Hello Hi Aay Haay	Sabki Bajegi Band	Chin2 Bhosle, Sanjeev Rathod, Sowmya Raoh
2015	Mein Band Botal Sharab	Anjaan Parindey	
2015	Radha Nachegi	Tevar	Shabab Sabri, Danish Sabri
2015	De Di Permission	Mumbai Can Dance Saala	Vinod Rathod
2014	Dil Mange Love More	Bhai Ka Maal Hai	
2014	Madam Ji	Chal Bhaag	Geet Sagar, Sadhu Sushil Tiwari
2014	Daba Kar Dum Doggy Bhage Re	Chal Bhaag	Sadhu Sushil Tiwari
2014	Palang Tod Naina	Holiday: A Soldier Is Never Off Duty	Mika Singh
2013	Gandi Baat (Film Version)	R. Rajkumar	Nakash Aziz
2013	Tu Bhi Mood Mein	Grand Masti	Sajid–Wajid
2013	Bhang Ke Nashe	Four Two Ka One	Kailash Kher
2013	O Jaane Jaana Meri	Chehra (2013 film)	Vardhan
2013	Crazy	Sajjan:The Real Friend	
2013	Allah Duhai Hai	Race 2	Atif Aslam, Pritam, Vishal Dadlani, Anushka Manchanda
2013	Blunder	Mumbai Mirror (film)	
2012	Bill Gates Ki Poti	Le Gaya Saddam	
2012	Dhishkiyaon	Kismat Love Paisa Dilli	Sonu Nigam
2012	Aaja Meri Jaan	Maximum (film)	Tochi Raina
2012	Chhamiyya Chhamiya	Overtime	Dhaa Joshi
2012	Madam Main Damma Lai	Daal Mein Kuch Kaala Hai	Apeksha Dandekar
2012	Mumbai Shahar Yeh Hai Mumbai	Dhama Chaukdi	
2012	Kachka Chilam	Vidhata-Tere Khel Hain Nirale	
2012	Kaga	Vidhata-Tere Khel Hain Nirale	
2012	Bad Boys	Department (film)	Earl
2012	Jhoom Jhoom Ta Ja	Players (film)	
2011	Ishq Da Mausam	Ye Stupid Pyar	Master Saleem
2011	Jalebi Bai	Double Dhamaal	Anand Raj Anand
2011	Kismat	Bin Bulaye Baraati	
2011	Razia Gundo Mein Phans Gayi "Razia" (Remix by Abhijit Vaghani)	Thank You (2011 film)	Master Saleem
2011	You Are The Reason	United Six	Neeraj Shridhar
2010	Chhan Ke Mohalla	Action Replayy	Sunidhi Chauhan
2010	Working Girls	Hello Darling	Shweta Pandit, Priyadarshini
2010	Tere Dar Pe Aaya Leke Band Baja	Hello Darling	Richa Sharma, Rana Mazumder
2010	Papa Jaag Jaayega	Housefull (2010 film)	Neeraj Shridhar, Alyssa Mendonsa
2008	Pukarta He Koi	Bach Ke Zara	
2008	Jee Le Zara	Bach Ke Zara	

=== Other languages ===
Year	Song	Film	Language	Co-singer(s)
2011	Ishaq Tilasmi Jaadu	The Lion of Punjab	Punjabi	Diljit Dosanjh
2011	Wow Wow	The Lion of Punjab	Punjabi	Diljit Dosanjh
2011	Karreena Saif Tattoo	The Lion of Punjab	Punjabi	Anand Raj Anand
2011	Kalke Tumi Amar	Murder	Bengali	Shaan
2013	God God Golyat	Majha Zali Sazaa	Marathi	
2012	Tattoo	Sadi Gali Aaya Karo	Punjabi	
2013	Hay Oolala	Adda	Telugu	Santhosh, Ramki
2019	Main Botal Ki Ran	Jaanbaaz	Bengali	

=== Albums ===
Year	Song	Album
2014	Kaise Sahen Dard-E-Judaai	Gam-E-Ishq Ka Maara Hu
2014	Pal Pal Satati Hai	Gam-E-Ishq Ka Maara Hu
2014	Jhoote Tere Wade	Gam-E-Ishq Ka Maara Hu
2010	Someone Somewhere-2	Someone Somewhere

=== Non-film songs ===
Year	Song	Co-singer(s)
2016	Holi Khele Nand Lala	Pankaj Kumar
