= The Aam Aadmi Family =

Indian comedy-drama series

- Genre: Comedy drama
- Written by: Kunal Aneja; Manan Madaan; Shefali Parashar; Abhishek Srivastava
- Directed by: Apoorv Singh Karki, Debatma Mandal
- Starring: Lubna Salim; Gunjan Malhotra; Chandan K Anand; Kamlesh Gill; Brijendra Kala
- Country of origin: India
- Original language: Hindi
- No. of seasons: 4
- No. of episodes: 20

Production
- Executive producer: Sameer Saxena

Original release
- Release: 5 November 2016 – 28 December 2020

The Aam Aadmi Family is an Indian comedy-drama series directed by Apoorv Singh Karki. The series debuted on a YouTube channel called The Timeliners, which garnered 10 million views. The first series featured Lubna Salim, Gunjan Malhotra, Chandan Anand, Kamlesh Gill, and Brijendra Kala. The Timeliners have released 3 seasons.

For the fourth season, the show moved to ZEE5. This was a part of the partnership between The Viral Fever and ZEE5 announced in June 2021 The premieres on 24 November 2023.

== Plot ==
Aam Aadmi Family is the story of a middle-class family, which features Sharma (Brijendra Kala) as the father, Madhu (Lubna Salim) as the mother, Bobby (Chandan Anand) as the naughty son, and Sonu (Gunjan Malhotra), their daughter being the sweetheart of the family. Daadi, played by Kamlesh Gill, is the notorious grandmother of the house.

== Cast ==
- Brijendra Kala as Mr. Satendra Sharma
- Lubna Salim as Mrs. Madhu Sharma
- Gunjan Malhotra as Bhavya "Sonu" Sharma (seasons 1-3)
- Saadhika Syal as Bhavya "Sonu" Sharma (season 4)
- Chandan Anand as Bobby
- Kamlesh Gill as Daadi (seasons 1-3)
- Salim Siddiqui as Doctor
- Sudhir Chobessy as Bindraji
- Pranay Manchanda as Sarthak
