= Mubarakan =

2017 Indian film by Anees Bazmee

- Directed by: Anees Bazmee
- Screenplay by: Balwinder Singh Janjua; Gurmmeet Singh; Rajesh Chawla (dialogue)
- Story by: Balwinder Singh Janjua; Rupinder Chahal
- Produced by: Murad Khetani; Ashwin Varde
- Starring: Anil Kapoor; Arjun Kapoor; Ileana D'Cruz; Athiya Shetty
- Narrated by: Vijay Raaz
- Cinematography: Himman Dhamija
- Edited by: Rameshwar S. Bhagat
- Music by: Songs: Amaal Mallik; Gourov-Roshin; Rishi Rich; Background Score: Amar Mohile
- Production companies: Sony Pictures Networks India Private Limited; Cine1 Studios; Mark Production
- Distributed by: Sony Pictures Releasing International
- Release date: 28 July 2017
- Running time: 156 minutes
- Country: India
- Language: Hindi
- Budget: ₹65 crore
- Box office: ₹93.24crore

Mubarakan (transl. Congratulations) is a 2017 Indian Hindi-language romantic comedy film directed by Anees Bazmee. The film stars Anil Kapoor, Arjun Kapoor (in a dual role), Ileana D'Cruz, Athiya Shetty, Neha Sharma, Karan Kundra and Ratna Pathak Shah in the lead roles with Sanjay Kapoor in a special appearance. The storyline revolves around twin brothers, both played by Arjun Kapoor in his second-ever dual role. The film released theatrically worldwide on 28 July 2017 in 2350 screens in India and 475 screens overseas.

Made on a budget of ₹650 million (US$6.7 million), Mubarakan has grossed over ₹93.24 million (US$970,000) at the global box office.

== Plot ==
In 1990, Avtar Singh Bajwa, his wife, and their twin sons meet with a car accident, which kills Avtar and his wife though the twins survive. They are sent to Avtar's brother Kartar, a confirmed bachelor, who gives the first son, Karan, to his London-based sister, Jeeto, and the second son, Charan, to his Punjab-settled brother, Baldev.

23 years later, Karan and Charan have grown up respectively in London and Punjab. Karan loves the hot and gorgeous Supreet "Sweety" Kaur Gill for 2 years, but Jeeto's husband, Paramjeet Sood, sets him to wed Binkle, the daughter of Paramjeet's business partner, Akalpreet Sandhu. To marry Sweety, Karan asks Baldev to make Charan marry Binkle. In Punjab, Charan is dating a Muslim, Nafisa Qureshi, but hasn't told this to Baldev as he is biased against Muslims. He takes Charan to London.

Charan tells about Nafisa to Kartar, who suggests that he act as a drug addict in front of the Sandhus to break the alliance. Charan does this but falls for Binkle at first sight. Her brother Manpreet, due to a misunderstanding, assumes him to be a druggist. Upset, Baldev misbehaves with Akalpreet, and Jeeto later insults him. He severs ties with her and decides to come back to Punjab. As Charan is back with Nafisa, he asks Karan to bring her to the airport to talk to Baldev. Karan brings Nafisa, but Charan is terrified to speak.

Due to this, Baldev assumes Nafisa is Karan's girlfriend. As he hears Sweety's father, Kuljeet, pleading for her wedding, he takes Charan's proposal for Sweety. She is upset at Karan. Jeeto sets him to marry Binkle. As Baldev arranges a destination marriage in London, everyone arrives there. Charan reveals to Binkle about Sweety and Karan, falling again for her. Nafisa reaches London. She and Manpreet fall in love. Charan reveals he also loves Binkle now and isn't a drug addict.

Kartar refuses to help Karan, Sweety, Charan, Binkle, Manpreet, and Nafisa. 25 December, the wedding day arrives when Karan and Charan exchange their sherwanis. Sweety reveals her love for Karan, shocking everyone. Kartar explains to Jeeto and Baldev to stop arguing and be silly. They patch up. Kartar orders Karan and Charan to have original identities. So, the film ends happily; Karan weds Sweety and Charan weds Binkle.

== Cast ==
- Anil Kapoor as Kartar Singh Bajwa
- Arjun Kapoor as Karan Singh Bajwa and Charan Singh Bajwa
- Ileana D'Cruz as Supreet "Sweety" Kaur Gill Bajwa: Charan's ex-fiancé; Karan's wife
- Athiya Shetty as Binkle Sandhu Bajwa: Karan's ex-fiancé; Charan's wife
- Karan Kundrra as Manpreet Sandhu: Binkle's brother
- Neha Sharma as Nafisa Qureshi Sandhu: Advocate; Charan's former love interest and ex-lover; Manpreet's lover
- Rahul Dev as Akalpreet Sandhu: Binkle and Manpreet's father
- Gurpal Singh as Kuljeet Singh Gill: Sweety's father
- Ratna Pathak Shah as Arshveer "Jeeto" Kaur Bajwa Sood: Kartar's sister; Karan and Charan's fraternal aunt; Karan's foster mother
- Pavan Malhotra as Baldev Singh Bajwa: Kuldeep's husband; Jeeto, Kartar and Avtaar's brother; Karan and Charan's paternal uncle; Charan's foster father
- Lalit Parimoo as Paramjeet Singh Sood: Jeeto's husband; Karan and Charan's fraternal uncle; Karan's foster father; Nikki's father
- Geeta Agarwal Sharma as Kuldeep Kaur Bajwa: Baldev's wife; Karan and Charan's paternal aunt; Charan's foster mother
- Bhoomika Sharma as Baby Kaur Bajwa: Baldev and Kuldeep's daughter; Charan's foster sister; Jeeto, Avtaar, and Kartar's niece
- Nikkita Chadha as Nikki Sood: Jeeto and Paramjeet's daughter; Karan's foster sister; Baldev, Avtaar, and Kartar's niece; Billa's wife
- Mohit Chhabra as Billa: Jeeto and Paramjeet's son-in-law; Nikki's husband
- Juhee Pahuja as Jugni Kaur Bajwa: Avtaar's wife; Karan and Charan's mother
- Sanjay Kapoor as Avtaar Singh Bajwa: Jeeto, Kartar and Baldev's brother; Jugni's husband; Karan and Charan's father
- Alexander Dolbenko as Jolly
- Krishan Tandon as Trilochan "Babaji"

== Production ==
The Guru Nanak Darbar Gurdwara in Gravesend, Kent features as the temple the families worship. The film is originally scheduled to release on 10 August 2015.

== Soundtrack ==
Mubarakan

Soundtrack album by Amaal Mallik, Gourov Roshin, Rishi Rich and Yash Anand
- Released: 6 July 2017
- Recorded: 2013–2015
- Genre: Feature film soundtrack
- Length: 24:45
- Language: Hindi
- Label: T-Series

Amaal Mallik chronology
Golmaal Again (2017)	Mubarakan (2017)	Badrinath Ki Dulhania (2017)

Gourov Roshin chronology
Force 2 (2016)	Mubarakan (2017)	Wajah Tum Ho (2016)

Rishi Rich chronology
Half Girlfriend (2017)	Mubarakan (2017)	Behen Hogi Teri (2017)

Singles from Mubarakan
- 1. "Mubarakan (Title Track)" Released: 22 June 2017; 2. "Hawa Hawa" Released: 29 June 2017

The music of the film has been composed by Amaal Mallik, Gourov Roshin, Rishi Rich, while the lyrics have been penned by Kumaar. Its first song, "Mubarakan (Title Track)" was released on 22 June 2017. The second single titled "Hawa Hawa" which is sung by Mika Singh and Prakriti Kakar, was released on 29 June 2017. This was the copy of Pakistani singer Hasan Jehangir's song. The soundtrack was unveiled on 6 July 2017 by T-Series, which consists of 6 songs.

All lyrics are written by Kumaar.

Track listing
No.	Title	Music	Singer(s)	Length
1.	"The Goggle Song" (Picturised on whole cast)	Amaal Mallik	Sonu Nigam, Armaan Malik, Amaal Mallik, Tulsi Kumar, Neeti Mohan	3:49
2.	"Mubarakan (Title Track)" (Picturised on main cast)	Rishi Rich, Yash Anand	Juggy D, Yash Narvekar, Badshah, Sukriti Kakar	3:11
3.	"Jatt Jaguar" (Picturised on main cast)	Amaal Mallik	Vishal Dadlani, Navraj Hans, Apeksha Dandekar	4:41
4.	"Haathon Mein Thhe Haath" (Picturised on Arjun Kapoor and Athiya Shetty)	Gourov Roshin	Papon, Altamash Faridi, Aditi Singh Sharma, Arpita Mukherjee	3:59
5.	"Hawa Hawa" (Picturised on Arjun Kapoor and Ileana D'Cruz)	Gourov Roshin	Mika Singh, Prakriti Kakar	4:32
6.	"Dil Dhadke Louder Louder" (Picturised on Arjun Kapoor, Ileana D'Cruz and Neha Sharma)	Gourov Roshin	Rinku Giri, Puja Basnet	4:31
Total length:				24:45

== Critical reception ==
Rohit Vats of Hindustan Times rated it 3/5 and felt that the lead actor, Arjun Kapoor, was overshadowed by Anil Kapoor: "It’s just that Anil Kapoor is a pro at it and steals all the limelight from him (Arjun).....You’ll be occasionally laughing, but probably won’t be leaving the theatre with a big smile on your face.

Meena Lyer of Times of India rated the film 3/5 and concluded: "Anil is the scene-stealer with his half Brit-half Punjabi act lifting the film throughout. Arjun’s double-act allows for some smiles and the girls, Ileana, Athiya and Neha are easy on the eye, though they’re just decorative set-pieces."

Manju Ramanan of Masala! gave the film 3.5/5, saying, "Loud characters, bright sets, songs and dances and slapstick humour dominate this Anees Bazmee film. But the instances do make you smile.

Ahana Bhattacharya of Koimoi gave the film 3/5, saying, "The story is funny and the film has some really hilarious dialogues. However, Sardar jokes are a bit clichéd and Bollywood needs to get over it. I loved the way the film builds up the confusion but it tends to drag towards the climax. There are moments when you will feel it is patriarchal, racist and regressive. Also, the climax is a bit predictable.
