= Mazhavillinattam Vare =

- Directed by: Kaithapram Damodaran Namboothiri
- Screenplay by: T. A. Razaq
- Story by: Kaithapram Damodaran Namboothiri
- Produced by: A. Mukundan
- Starring: Abbas Hasan; Archana Jose Kavi
- Cinematography: Gunasekaran
- Music by: Deepankuran
- Production company: Valluvan Kadavu Creations
- Distributed by: Sree Gokulam Films
- Release date: May 2012
- Country: India
- Language: Malayalam

Mazhavillinattam Vare (transl. Till the End of the Rainbow) is a Malayalam–language sports and musical film co-written and directed by Kaithapram Damodaran Namboothiri. The screenplay is written by T.A. Razaq based on the story by Kaithapram. It will be the directorial debut of Kaithapram, a noted poet, writer, lyricist, composer and actor from Malayalam cinema. It stars Abbas Hasan and Archana Jose Kavi in the lead roles, with Sai Kumar, Salim Kumar, Madhu, Nedumudi Venu, Krishna and Kaviyoor Ponnamma playing other prominent roles. Cricketers Syed Kirmani, Kapil Dev, Sreesanth, Robin Singh, Roger Binny, and J. K. Mahendra appear in cameo roles. Produced by A. Mukundan under the banner of Valluvan Kadavu Creations, it features music composed by the director's son Deepankuran and cinematography by Gunasekaran. Produced by A. Mukundan under the banner of Valluvan Kadavu Creations, it features music composed by the director's son Deepankuran and cinematography by Gunasekaran.

The film is about the life-changing journey of a young Pakistani cricketer (Abbas Hasan) and a college student (Archana Kavi) who is an ardent admirer of him. Principal photography of the film began in September 2010, and is being completed from Kannur and Thalassery, Kerala. It is to be distributed by Sree Gokulam Films.

== Cast ==
- Abbas Hasan as Yassin Mubarak Azad
- Archana Jose Kavi as Rabiya
- Sai Kumar as the Theyyam artist
- Salim Kumar as the cook
- Madhu
- Nedumudi Venu
- Roger Binny as himself
- Robin Singh as himself
- Sreesanth as himself
- Kapil Dev as himself
- Syed Kirmani as himself
- J. K. Mahendra as himself

== Casting ==
The film's protagonist is Yassin Mubarak Azad, a Pakistani cricketer who comes to Kerala on a mission. Pakistani fast bowler Mohammed Asif was originally cast in this role but was replaced when he was found involved in a match fixing scandal. Kaithapram then signed Pakistani batsman Mohammad Hafeez in the role. He was also replaced due to his busy cricket schedules. Kaithapram's final choice was Abbas Hasan, a Canadian-born, Paris-raised, and London-based Pakistani singer. Hasan is on his acting debut through this film. Malayalee cricketer Sreesanth was also reportedly considered for playing an important role. After Sreesanth was arrested on charges of spot-fixing in the Indian Premier League, Kaithapram announced that he would be cutting out those scenes featuring the cricketer from the film.

== Soundtrack ==
The film's music is by Deepankuran. The soundtrack album was launched by actor Mammootty on 3 January 2011, at Gokulam Auditorium, Kochi.
