= Gunjan Malhotra =

Indian actress

- Occupation: Actress

Gunjan Malhotra is an Indian actress, acting in Indian Hindi films and commercials. She acted in the web series The Aam Aadmi Family, by the "Timeliners".

== Career ==
Gunjan featured in commercials such as Oreo with Ranbir Kapoor and SYSKA LED lights with Irrfan Khan, portrayed the role of a sister to both the actors in the commercials. She got her Bollywood debut in the movie Tevar, where again she played the role of Arjun Kapoor's sister.

She had her first lead role in the movie Badmashiyaan a romantic comedy film. Recently, she played a small role of Meher Poonawala in the movie Airlift with Akshay Kumar.

== Filmography ==
=== Films ===
Year	Title	Role	Note
2015	Tevar	Pinky	
2015	Badmashiyaan	Palak Mehra	
2016	Airlift	Meher Poonawala	
2017	Toilet: Ek Prem Katha	Akshay's Sister	Cameo Appearance

=== TV & webseries ===
Year	Title	Role	Note
2016	Life Sahi Hai	Shruti Aggarwal	ZEE5
2016	24	Zaara	Season 2
2016	The Aam Aadmi Family	Sonu	3 Seasons
2017 - 18	Half Ticket	Rhea Sharma	2 Seasons
2018	Still about Section 377	Palak	
