= Amritpal Chotu =

Indian comedian and actor (died 2023)

- Born: Amritpal Singh; Punjab, India
- Died: 17 February 2023

Comedy career
- Medium: Stand-up, Film, television
- Genres: Observational comedy, musical comedy, one-liners
- Subjects: Bollywood, Punjabi culture
- Website: Official Facebook site

Amritpal Chotu (died 17 February 2023) was an Indian Punjabi and Bollywood comedian and actor. He worked in many Bollywood and Punjabi Movies.

== Filmography ==
=== Punjabi ===
Year	Film	Role	Notes
2014	Marriage Da Garriage		
2015	Sardaar Ji	Jhundii	with Diljit Dosanjh
2016	Sardaar Ji 2	Fauji's son	with Diljit Dosanjh
