= Lubna Salim =

Indian actress

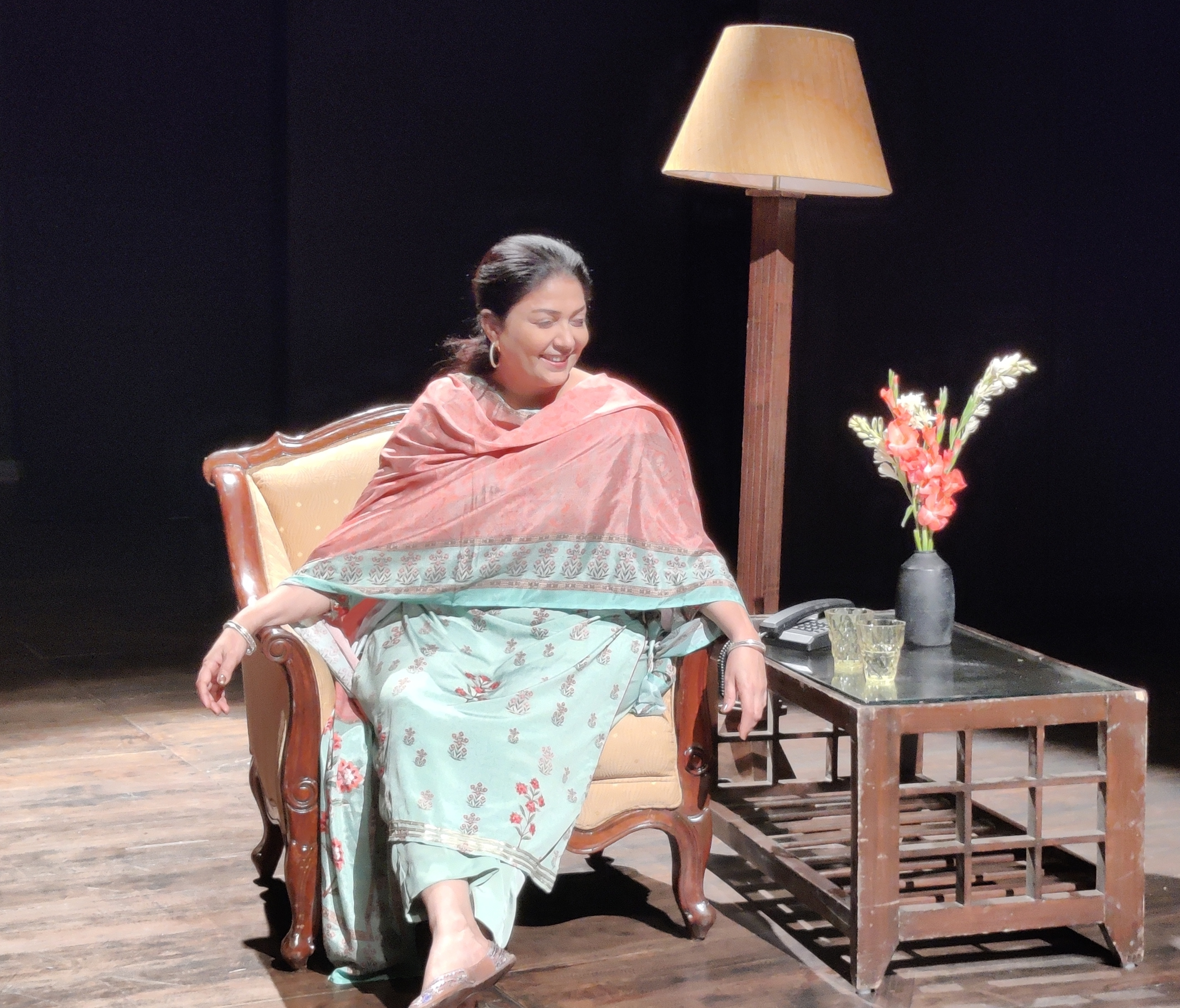
- Lubna Salim
- Born: Mumbai, India
- Occupations: Actress and Theatrical producer
- Known for: Leela Thakkar in Baa Bahu Aur Baby; Ganga Joshi in 2025 Jaane Kya Hoga Aage; Yashoda in Mera Naam Karegi Roshan; Paroma in Ek Packet Umeed; Santosh Kaur Monga in Teri Meri Doriyaann; Dimple Tandon in Dr. Aarambhi

Lubna Salim (née Siddiqui) is an Indian theatre, movie and television actress. She is also the founder and producer for the theatre group Essay Ensemble.

== Early life and education ==
She is the daughter of the popular script writer Javed Siddiqui. She studied at Mithibai College Mumbai, and pursued theatre at the inter-collegiate level.

== Career ==
She won the Indian Telly Award in 2008 for her role in Baa Bahoo Aur Baby. In 2010, she acted in the play Lakeerein, written by Gulzar and directed by Salim Arif, opposite actor, Yashpal Sharma. She was also seen in the serial Khidki.

== Personal life ==
She is married to theatre director Salim Arif.

== Filmography ==
=== Films ===
Year	Title	Role
1988	Parbat Ke Us Paar	Shabana
2007	Just Married	Nandini Sachdeva
2012	OMG – Oh My God	Susheela Mehta
2017	Call for Fun	Sheila Mehra
2019	Photograph	Sheilaben Shah
2023	Gadar 2	Aunt

=== Television ===
Year	Title	Role	Notes	Ref.
1988	Bharat Ek Khoj			
2005–2009	Baa Bahoo Aur Baby	Leela Thakkar	Season 1	
2008	Ek Packet Umeed	Paroma		
2010	Mera Naam Karegi Roshan	Yashoda		
2015	2025 Jaane Kya Hoga Aage	Ganga Joshi		
2016	Khidki	Jyoti Thakkar		
2017–2018	Rishton Ka Chakravyuh	Madhu Pathak		
2018	Mariam Khan - Reporting Live	Rifat Wasim		
2023–2024	Teri Meri Doriyaann	Santosh Kaur Monga		
2026–present	Dr. Aarambhi	Dimple Tandon		

=== Web series ===
Year	Title	Role	Notes	Ref.
2017–2023	The Aam Aadmi Family	Mrs. Madhu Sharma	Season 1, 2, 3, 4	
2020–2022	The Gone Game	Barkha Kapoor	Season 1, 2	
2020	Sandwiched Forever	Manjari Sarnaik		
2020	Bhalla Calling Bhalla	Lovely Bhalla		
2021	Fittrat		Season 2	
