= Waleed Jahangir =

British entrepreneur and event organiser

- Born: 6 August 1977 (age 49)
- Education: South Bank University
- Occupations: Entrepreneur and event organiser

Waleed Jahangir (born 6 August 1977) is a British entrepreneur and event organiser known for his contributions to the Halal consumer market. He has founded and organised events such as the London Muslim Shopping Festival, London Eid Festival, and the World Halal Food Festival.

== Early life ==
Jahangir was born in London on 6 August 1977. He pursued his education at South Bank University, earning a degree in Business Information Technology.

== Career ==
Jahangir is the CEO of Algebra Consulting. He serves as the chairman of the British Islamic Trade Association.

In 2016, he launched the London Muslim Lifestyle Show at Olympia London, reported to be one of the first large-scale consumer exhibitions catering specifically to the UK's growing Muslim market. The show featured a two-day comedy segment hosted by Abdullah Afzal, known for his role in the BBC series Citizen Khan. It also included cooking demonstrations by The Great British Bake Off contestant Ali Imdad and 2012 MasterChef winner Shelina Permalloo. Additionally, the event presented a performance by singer Sami Yusuf, a fashion show, and a children's learning zone with a theatre production. More than 5,000 children reportedly attended the event. Jahangir later introduced the London Muslim Shopping Festival, an annual retail-focused event that reportedly became popular in the UK Halal market. In 2024, the festival completed its sixth year and featured over 250 shopping stalls, a Halal food court, modest fashion live catwalk shows, and a kids’ zone, attracting approximately 20,000 visitors annually.

Jahangir also established the London Eid Festival, which has reportedly become a significant platform for celebrating Eid al-Fitr in the UK. Introduced and Held at Westfield London in 2018, the festival features a variety of activities, including fashion shows, food stalls, live entertainment (comedians, singers, Sufi musicians, DJs), and family-friendly events. The festival has attracted over 350,000 visitors, reportedly making it one of the largest Eid celebrations in Europe. In 2024, the festival completed its fifth Eid-al-Fitr celebration event.

Additionally, he founded the World Halal Food Festival, recognised as one of the largest Halal food events globally. The festival features halal chefs, live cooking demonstrations, Halal certification discussions, food stalls and showcases cuisines from over 25 countries and reported to feature more than 150 exhibitors. Held at the London Stadium in Queen Elizabeth Olympic Park, the event has attracted thousands of attendees annually. In 2024, the festival completed its ninth year in London and attracts approximately 20,000 attendees annually. In recognition for its impact, the event was named Best Live Event at the Asian Media Awards.

Through BITA, Jahangir has supported the international expansion of more than 200 SMEs, with the organisation reporting £25–30 million in export contracts across halal food, cosmetics, modest fashion and tourism. He has reportedly led over 15 trade missions to Turkey, Bosnia, the UAE, Qatar, Azerbaijan and Croatia. BITA states that these trips facilitated more than £20 million in bilateral agreements, including a £5.2 million trade deal from a 2022 Istanbul delegation. BITA has also signed memoranda of understanding with several chambers of commerce in Europe and the Middle East.

Since 2020, Jahangir has been listed as a community outreach advisor to the Metropolitan Police, working on anti-discrimination and trust-building programmes at cultural events. In 2021, he began integrating NHS public health campaigns—such as vaccination drives, blood donation and health screening—into major festivals, reportedly engaging more than 150,000 attendees from minority and underserved communities.

During the COVID-19 pandemic, Jahangir oversaw the digitisation of trade expos, which organisers credit with sustaining £1.2 million in SME revenue during market disruption. His Export Accelerator Programme has mentored more than 50 SMEs, with internal reports stating that 85% recorded measurable growth within a year. In addition, his platforms have raised over £1 million for charitable initiatives, with civic messages incorporated into commercial events.

His early career included businesses in entertainment and hospitality, He co-founded Rishi Rich Productions. He also co-founded Bar Bollywood in Mayfair, London.

== Recognition ==
Jahangir has been recognised for his contributions to event management and the Halal economy.

- He has been listed among the Top 50 most influential Muslims in Europe and featured in Islamica 500
- Hot50 Event Management Award, for his work in organising large-scale, cultural events.
- In 2019, he was awarded the 3rd London Asian Business Awards’ Creative Entrepreneur of the Year.
- The London Muslim Lifestyle Show received the “Event of the Year” award at the 6th annual British Muslim Awards in 2018, for promoting Muslim culture and commerce.
