= Punjabian Da King =

- Directed by: Manduip Singh
- Written by: Manduip Singh; Jagdeep Sidhu
- Produced by: Surender Singh
- Starring: Navraj Hans; Keeya khanna Hobby Dhaliwal; Bhanu Sri Mehra; Jarnail Singh; Shivendra Mahal; Bhottu Shah
- Cinematography: Jot Sohal
- Edited by: Akshay R Mohan
- Music by: Navraj Hans
- Release date: 27 March 2015
- Country: India
- Language: Punjabi

Punjabian Da King is a 2015 Punjabi Action Drama film directed by Manduip Singh and produced by Surender Singh. The film stars Navraj Hans, Keeya khanna, Bhanu Sri Mehra, Jagdeep Sidhu, Mandeep Chaahal, Singh, Shivendra Mahal, Bhottu Shah, Hobby Dhalliwal, and Bunny.

== Cast ==
- Navraj Hans
- Keeya Khanna
- Bhanu Sri Mehra
- Jarnail Singh
- Shashi Kiran
- Bhottu Shah
- Shivendra Mahal
- Hobby Dhaliwal
- Baninder Bunny

Starring

• Mandeep Chaahal

• Jagdeep Sidhu

• Sanjiv pal singh

• Surender Singh

• Rajinder
