= Keeya Khanna =

Indian actress

- Born: Mumbai, India
- Occupation: Actress
- Years active: 2014–present

Keeya Khanna is an Indian actress. She predominantly appears in Hindi and Punjabi cinema as well as acting in theater plays.

== Filmography ==
Year	Film	Character	Language	Notes
2014	Marriage da garriage	Simran	Punjabi	Punjabi film debut
2014	Chal Bhaag	Kajri	Hindi	Hindi film debut
2014	Punjabian Da King	Jashan	Punjabi	
2015	Yaar Anmulle 2	Jessica	Punjabi	
2018	Dakuan da Munda		Punjabi	Special appearance
2023	Gumraah	Mrs. Saigal	Hindi	

== See also ==
- List of Indian film actresses
