= Behen Hogi Teri =

2017 Indian romantic comedy film

- Poster
- Directed by: Ajay K Pannalal
- Written by: Ajay K Pannalal; Vinit Vyas
- Produced by: Tonny D'souza; Amul Vikas Mohan; Nitin Upadhyaya
- Starring: Rajkummar Rao; Shruti Haasan
- Cinematography: Viraj Singh Gohil
- Edited by: Devendra Murdeshwar
- Music by: Songs; Yash Narvekar; Amjad-Nadeem; Kaushik-Akash-Guddu(JAM8); Jaidev Kumar; R. D. Burman; Rishi Rich; Background Music; Jaidev Kumar
- Production company: OddBall Motion Pictures
- Distributed by: AA Films
- Release date: 9 June 2017
- Running time: 128 minutes
- Country: India
- Language: Hindi
- Box office: ₹2.76 crore

Behen Hogi Teri (transl. Must be your younger sister) is a 2017 Indian Hindi-language romantic comedy film directed and co-written by Ajay K Pannalal. The film stars Rajkummar Rao and Shruti Haasan. This film was scheduled for a worldwide release on 26 May 2017, but the release was pushed back to 9 June 2017. It opened to mixed reviews and was a box office failure.

== Plot ==
In the city of Lucknow, Gattu (Rajkummar Rao), a jobless UPSC aspirant, has fallen in love with Binny (Shruti Haasan), a girl who lives in his neighbourhood and is well aware of Gattu's feelings for her but doesn't pay much attention to him because she finds him to be a coward. Gattu's desire for a marital bond with Binny puts him in a situation where he has to not just face off with a family of criminals who want to make Binny their daughter-in-law at any cost but also gather the courage to convince his own parents and neighbours that all boys and girls living in the same neighbourhood are not brothers and sisters.

== Cast ==
- Rajkummar Rao as Shiv "Gattu" Nautiyal
- Shruti Haasan as Binny Arora
- Gautam Gulati as Rahul Saluja, Binny's prospective groom
- Herry Tangri as Bhura Bhati, Gattu's best friend
- Darshan Jariwala as Hemchander Nautiyal, Gattu's father
- Natasha Rastogi as Mrs. Nautiyal, Gattu's mother
- Ninad Kamat as Jaydev Arora, Binny's elder brother
- Gulshan Grover as Dhappi Pehalwaan, Bhura's father
- Ranjeet as Gajender Pehalwaan, Bhura's uncle
- Meenakshi Sethi aa Mrs. Arora, Binny's mother
- Reena Aggarwal as Ritu Arora, Binny's sister
- Simona as Daadi, Binny's grandmother
- Bhavya Datta as Ajju Arora, Binny's younger brother
- Ritu Gaur as Rahul's Mom
- Durgesh Kumar as Inspector

== Soundtrack ==
Behen Hogi Teri

Soundtrack album by Yash Narvekar, Amjad Nadeem, JAM8, Jaidev Kumar, R. D. Burman & Rishi Rich
- Released: 23 May 2017
- Genre: Feature film soundtrack
- Length: 28:14
- Label: Zee Music Company
External audio
- Audio Jukebox on YouTube

The soundtrack of Behen Hogi Teri consists seven songs composed by Yash Narvekar, Amjad Nadeem, JAM8, Jaidev Kumar, R. D. Burman & Rishi Rich.

Tracklist
No.	Title	Lyrics	Music	Singer(s)	Length
1.	"Tera Hoke Rahoon"	Bipin Das	JAM8Kaushik-Akash-Guddu	Arijit Singh	3:24
2.	"Jaanu"	Anand Bakshi, Raftaar	R.D. Burman, Recreated by: Rishi Rich	Raftaar, Juggy D, Shivi	4:03
3.	"Teri Yaadon Mein"	Yash Narvekar, Amit Dhanani	Yash Narvekar	Yasser Desai, Shubhanshu Kesharwani, Pawni Pandey, Yash Narvekar	3:53
4.	"Jai Maa"	Sonu Saggu	Jaidev Kumar	Sahil Solanki, Jyotica Tangri, Parry G	2:56
5.	"Tenu Na Bol Pawaan"	Rohit Sharma	Amjad Nadeem	Yasser Desai, Jyotica Tangri	4:55
6.	"Tenu Na Bol Pawaan (Reprise)"	Rohit Sharma	Amjad Nadeem	Asees Kaur	5:45
7.	"Teri Yaadon Mein (Reprise)"	Yash Narvekar, Amit Dhanani	Yash Narvekar	Yash Narvekar, Sukriti Kakar	3:18
Total length:					28:14

== Critical reception ==
Rajeev Masand of News18 gave the film two stars out of five; he praised Rao's performance but criticised the weak screenplay: "Where the film slips up is in its writing. The plot, which starts off on a curious note becomes especially convoluted in its second hour". Sweta Kausal of Hindustan Times gave the film a rating of 2 out of 5 and said that, "Behen Hogi Teri suffers from a poorly conceived plot that fails to offer the fun expected of a story of its kind. The only enjoyable parts of the movie are the dialogues and the acting of Rajkummar." Saibal Chatterjee of NDTV found the writing of the film and Shruti Haasan's acting performance to be extremely weak and concluded his review by saying that, "Watch Behen Hogi Teri only if you think a one-man show is good enough to offset the drudgery of a two-hour trudge through a maze of inanities." Saibal gave the film a rating of 2 out of 5.

Shubhra Gupta of The Indian Express gave the film a rating of 1.5 out of 5 and said that, "The only element worth looking at in this film, apart from the dependable Kamat, is the rock-solid Rao. If he was given a better co-star than the strictly one-note Haasan, this might have turned out to be a better film." Nihit Bhave of The Times of India gave the film a rating of 2.5 out of 5 and said that, "The plot is juvenile to say the least" and "the only reason to smile at the movie is Rajkummar Rao". Namrata Joshi of The Hindu said that, "The possibility of an interesting film gets lost in an overcooked script shorn of any remarkable situations and humour." Rachit Gupta of Filmfare gave the film a rating of 2.5. out of 5 and said that, "While the premise of Behen Hogi Teri holds promise, the film is written with very little imagination. It plays out in a terribly familiar fashion. Its like you’ve watched this film's formula 10000 times before."
