= Shardul Rathod =

Indian film writer

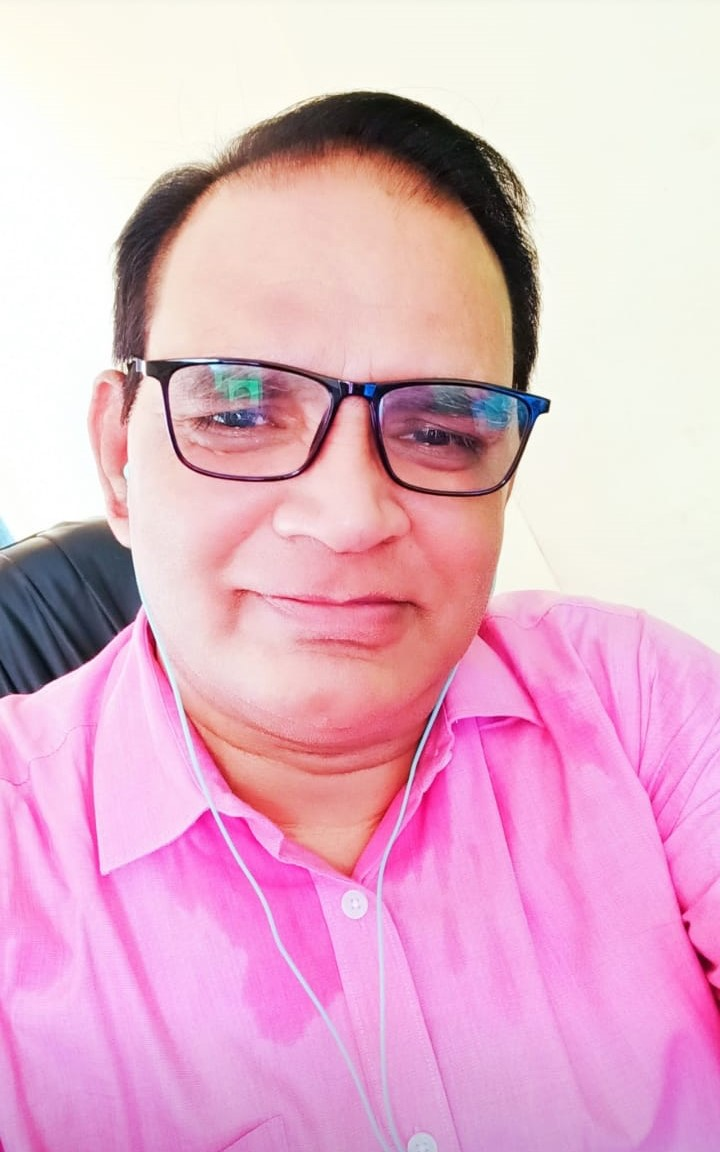

Background information
- Born: Rajasthan, India
- Occupations: Screen writer Composer, Lyricist
- Years active: 2003–present
- Labels: T-Series; Zee Music; Wings Entertainment Limited; Venus Records & Tapes; Saregama

Shardul Rathod is an Indian film writer. He works for entertainment as a screenwriter & film director since 2003. He was born in Delhi. He has a PhD in Hindi. He knows many languages: Hindi, English, Urdu, Rajasthani, and Brij. He moved to Mumbai in 2003 and started working in the Indian film industry as a scriptwriter. He has done many musical albums with T-series and with Anup Jalota. He has done more than six animated films for kids for Landmark Toonz Hydrabad, India. He specialises in action comedy films and has written many series for television.

== Early life ==
After competition of his study, he started his profession in medical practice.

== Career ==
Rathod started his career in 2003, as a lyricist & dialogue writer,

== Discography ==
Year	Track	Artist(s)	Designation	YouTube Views
2021	Dil Galti Kar Baitha Hai	Jubin Nautiyal, Mouni Roy	Composer & Lyricist	650 Million+
2020	Jinki Pratima Itni Sunder Wo KItna Sunder Honga	Pamela Jain	Lyricist	145 Million+

Shardul Rathod wrote and composed (with Meet Bros and Manoj Muntashir) the blockbuster song Dil Galti Kar Baitha Hai, sung by Jubin Nautiyal, released by T-Series, YouTube approved his channel as Official Artist Channel

== Screenwriter ==
As a writer from 2003

- Wrote title song for TV serial "Dharamputra" (sung by Sunidhi Chauhan music by Daboo Malik
- Makasad Hindi film Mithun Chakraborty and Om Puri
- Marriage da Garriage Punjabi film Starrer- Shakti Kapoor, Upasna Singh Razzak Khan
- TV Serial Andher Nagari Chaupat Raja (reconstruction)
- Animation Film Bhakta Prahalad by Sanjeev Shah of Landmark Toonz
- Animation Film Jhansi Ki Rani by Sanjeev Shah of Land Mark Toonz
- Animation Film Abhimanyu by Sanjeev Shah of Landmark Toonz
- Animation Film Luv-Kush by Sanjiv Shah of Landmark Toonz"Bas Ek Tamanna".
- Animation Film Kaddu and Kukki by Sanjeev Shah of Landmark Toon
- 7–8 Other Animation Films in other languages
- More Than 20 South Indian Film in Hindi By Kioshi And Others
- Hindi Feature Film Bass Ek Tamanna (2011), music by Ishak sarotiyawala
- Hindi Feature Film Molly (lyrics writer)By Rajeev Gupta
- More Than 300 Songs With T-Series Mumbai
- working on Hindi Feature Film Maqsadd (As a writer) with Anup Jalota Mumbai
- Another film (Mannu Bhai Enn Aar Aayi)
- A comedy film Kaam Chaloo Hai with Anil Kapoor Productions, Mumbai
- Up to 40 Songs for Hindi Feature Films in Mumbai
- Completed One Historical TV Serial for Farook Sayed (1040 Episodes)
- Doing Two Films (The Lake and Missing) with Director N. Mohla
- Film (Let's Change) for Dilzan Wadia
- Suhani Yaadein for DD Urdu as Music Composer and Lyricist.
- Hindi Feature Film "Mumbai Night Club" Suhaib Saabri of AAnas films Mumbai
- Music Album "Dil Galati kar baitha Hai" Sung by Zubin Nautiyal (SCI) Mumbai
