= Abbas Hasan =

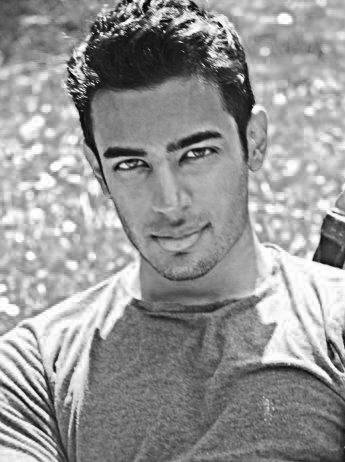
- Born: Abbas Hasan; Ottawa, Ontario, Canada
- Occupations: Singer; actor
- Musical career
- Genres: Pop, Asian Pop
- Instruments: Vocals

Abbas Hasan is a United Kingdom-based French Canadian pop music artist and actor of South Asian heritage. He was named "the next big thing" in the Asian music and film scene by MTV India and Hello! magazine, and won Artist of the Year at the 2014 Anokhi Media Awards in Canada. He was named one of the UK's Top 5 Most Stylish Asian Men by the New Asian Post. He is the brand ambassador for the New York-based luxury watch company Nooka. Abbas's music has South Asian and Middle Eastern influences and he sings in English, Urdu, Hindi, and French.

== Biography ==
Abbas Hasan is of Pakistani heritage. Born in Canada, Abbas moved to Paris, France at the age of one. His childhood music experience included advertisements and public broadcasts, and he performed for Disney in Paris. His acting, music, and modelling career has taken him from France to Canada and Great Britain. He is signed with Rishi Rich Productions.

He has been referred to by music press as the next Jay Sean; Abbas performs in French, Urdu, English, and Hindi.

Abbas is an ambassador for the New York-based luxury watch company Nooka. He was named Bachelor of the Year for 2010 by Asian Woman Magazine, included in Asiana Magazine's Most Eligible Bachelors List for 2010, and was included in a list of Top 10 Most Handsome South Asian Male Models in the UK, compiled by event management company KZ Entertainment.

== Music ==
Abbas's music experience began with performing for Disney as a child in Paris. Abbas's debut single with Rishi Rich was called "Sona" and topped the British Asian music charts shortly after its release. His next single "Habibi" did equally well. After touring the United Kingdom with the BBC Asian Network's Melas, Abbas went to India to star in his first film.

After performing at the London premiere of Teri Meri Kahaani, Abbas performed at the first ever Times of India Film Awards (TOIFA) held in Vancouver, British Columbia, Canada. He went on a European tour with Bollywood singer Shreya Ghoshal and released a song with Rishi Rich entitled "Away", with music video starring actress Humaima Malick. Abbas was nominated for the Artist of the Year award by Anokhi in Canada for 2014.

== Acting ==
Abbas played the lead role in a Malayalam-language film titled Mazhavillinattam Vare. Abbas made a cameo appearance in a television advertisement with Shah Rukh Khan.
