= Rishi Rich =

British record producer

Rishpal Rekhi; ਰਿਸ਼ਪਾਲ ਰੈਖੀ
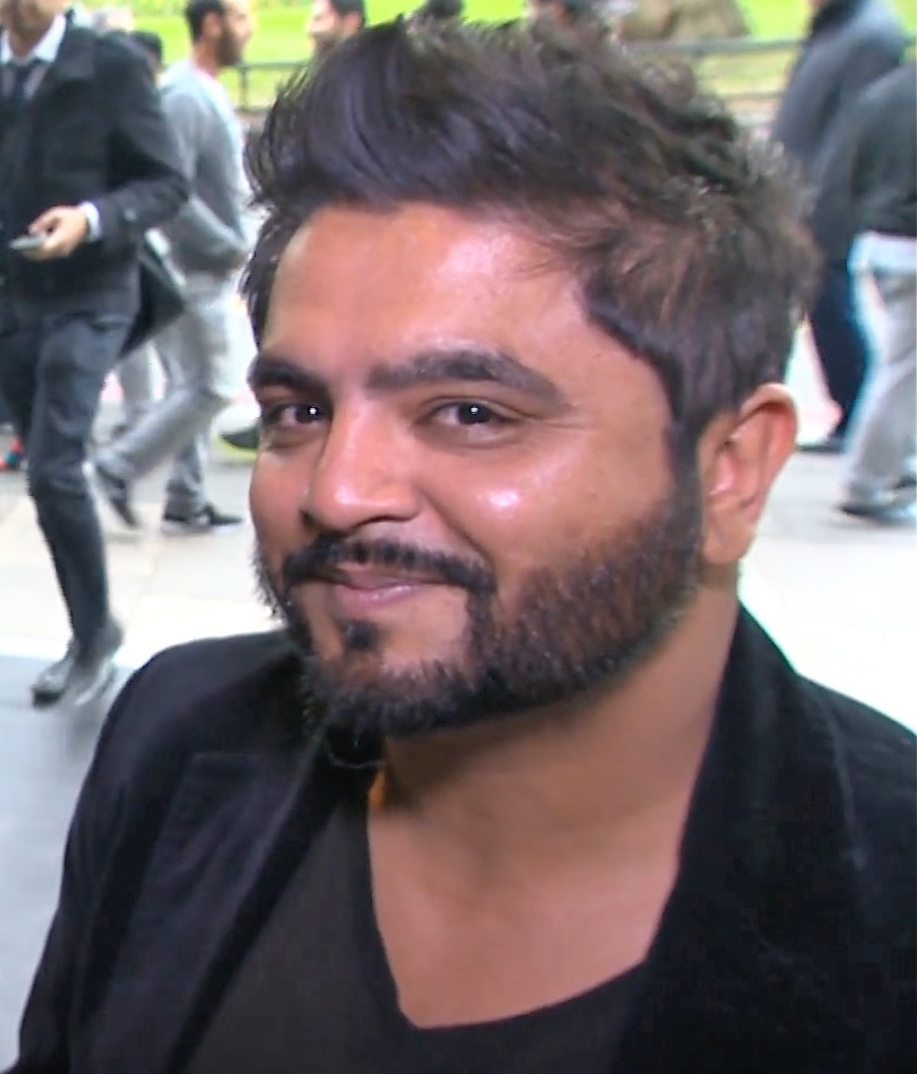
- Rich in 2015

Background information
- Also known as: Rishi Rekhi; The Rishi Rich Project
- Born: Rishpal Singh Rekhi; Croydon, London, England
- Genres: Bhangra; Punjabi; filmi; Hindi pop; alternative hip-hop; trip hop; UK garage; R&B
- Years active: 1992–present
- Labels: Moviebox Records; Rishi Rich Productions Ltd. (RRP); 2Point9 Records
- Website: www.rishirich.com

Rishpal Singh Rekhi (Punjabi: ਰਿਸ਼ਪਾਲ ਸਿੰਘ ਰੈਖੀ) better known by his stage name Rishi Rich, is a British-Indian music producer based in London. He began his career in the Asian Underground scene and later became internationally known for his bhangra tracks, his Hindi remixes, and as a pioneer of Asian-R&B fusion music.

Through the Rishi Rich Project, he was responsible for launching British Asian talents who would later gain mainstream success, such as Jay Sean, Juggy D, Veronica Mehta, and Mumzy Stranger. In addition, Rich launched the singing career of Canadian artist, Jasmine K Kara, as the two collaborated in 2022 to release "The Ishq (Rishi Rich Remix)". Jasmine K Kara has mentioned being a "huge fan" of the Rishi Rich Project's debut single, "Dance with You" (Nachna Tere Naal), and refers to the experience of working with Rich as a "dream come true".

Rich has also released his own solo albums, Simply Rich in 2002 with Ishq Records and The Project in 2006 with 2Point9 Records and his produced songs have appeared in a number of Bollywood films. He runs Rishi Rich Productions and has contracts with a number of British Asian artists including H-Dhami, Mumzy Stranger, Veronica Mehta, Tasha Tah and Abbas Hasan.

== The Rishi Rich Project ==
Rishi Rich worked in the UK with a number of Asian artists and co-produced a number of Asian music albums. In January 2003, he signed a management contract with 2Point9 Records. Soon after, he formed the Rishi Rich Project; the objective of which was to showcase up-and-coming talent. The Rishi Rich releases quickly became famous in the Asian Underground scene, being pioneers of contemporary R&B-bhangra fusion. They subsequently found success in India and helped popularise Asian-R&B fusion sounds in both the Asian underground scene and in Indian pop music.

"Dance with You (Nachna Tere Naal)", released on 8 September 2003, was the debut single by the Rishi Rich Project and was produced by Rich and featured Jay Sean (singing in English) and Juggy D (in Punjabi). It was an Asian Underground song with the music video set at a block party in a London neighbourhood. The song peaked at No. 12 on the UK Singles Chart and No. 2 on the Dutch Top 40. It also won "Best Single R&B" at the 2003 UK Asian Music Awards. It is considered Jay Sean's first successful single and was later included on his debut album Me Against Myself (2004), produced by Rishi Rich himself, as well as on Rich's album, Rishi Rich Project. The song was also included on the soundtrack for the 2003 Bollywood film Boom.

On 27 April 2007, Rich announced that he was parting with his record company 2Point9 Records, marking the end of the Rishi Rich Project. After their departures from the project, Jay Sean went on to become a successful international Asian artist (topping the US Hot 100 in 2009), while Juggy D became one of the most successful British artists in the mainstream Indian market.

In 2015, Rich, Jay Sean and Juggy D reunited as the Rishi Rich Project and released the single "Freak".

== Solo career ==
Rich released his first solo album Simply Rich fuses urban music and bhangra. The album was successful in the Asian pop charts, and resulted in a number of singles, including "Nahin Jeena" with vocals by Don D and Juggy D, and "Nahin Tere Jeha Hor Disda" with vocals by Pakistani Qawwali singer Javed Bashir (based on Nusrat Fateh Ali Khan's "Kiven Mukhre Ton Nazran Hatawan") with the music video featuring cameo appearances by Bally Sagoo, Juggy D, Jay Sean and Veronica Mehta.

His second solo release, The Project, in 2006 included the single "Push It Up (Aaja Kuriye)" featuring Juggy D and Jay Sean, peaking at No 1 on the BBC Asian Network Chart.

Rishi released his third album, The Lost Beats, in 2014.

== Rishi Rich Productions ==
In 2007, Rich started Rishi Rich Productions (RRP), a joint partnership with entertainment entrepreneur, Waleed Jahangir. The artists signed to the company are Rich himself, H-Dhami, Mumzy, Veronica Mehta (aka Veronica), Tasha Tah, Juggy D, and Abbas Hasan.

Rich won "Best Producer" at the UK Asian Music Awards in 2003 and also in 2009 for producing H-Dhami's debut album Sadke Java. At the 2009 event he also won a special "Commitment to the Scene" award.

== Filmography ==
Rich expanded also into Indian film and many of his productions appeared in various Bollywood films:

- Boom (2003): The track "Eyes on You" which was performed by Jay Sean was featured in the Bollywood film Boom. The song reached the UK top 10 in 2004 and was featured on Jay Sean's debut album Me Against Myself.
- Hum Tum (2004): Rich produced a track U'n'I for the first ever release from the Yash Raj music label, which featured in the film.
- Kyaa Kool Hai Hum (2005): The track "One Night", produced by Rich and sung by Jay Sean, was taken from Jay Sean's album Me Against Myself and was included in the 2005 film Kyaa Kool Hai Hum. However, the version on this soundtrack was entitled "Dil Mera (One Night)" and included vocals by Veronica as well as Jay Sean.
- Jackpot (2013): Rich produced the track "Kabhi Jo Baadal Barse" (Remix).
- Love Yoou Soniye (2013): Composed and sang "Love Yoou Soniye", the title track for the film with Juggy D
- Behen Hogi Teri (2017): He recreated the R.D. Burman's song Jaanu which was sung by Raftaar.
- Half Girlfriend (2017): Rich composed his first official Hindi song, "Mere Dil Mein", which has music notes astoundingly similar to the song U 'n' I.
- Poster Boys (2017): He composed "Kehende Menu" sung by Ikka, Yash Narvekar and Sukriti Kakar
- Mubarakan (2017): Rich composed the title track with Yash Anand. He also sang it with Badshah and Yash Anand
- Namaste England (2018): Rich composed a song titled "Bhaare Bazaar" with Badshah. Vishal Dadlani, Payal Dev, B Praak and Badshah sang the song.
- Gully Boy (2019): He composed "Doori", sung by Ranveer Singh.
- Bhangra Paa Le (2020): Along with JAM8 and Yash Narvekar He composed "Ho Ja Rangeela Re" which is sung by Shashwat Singh and "Sun Sajna" which is sung by Navraj Hans, Jonita Gandhi, Yash Narvekar and Kiranee
- Bad Boy Billionaires: India (2020) - Netflix documentary, composed the title track
- Sandeep Aur Pinky Faraar (2020): He composed song for the film

== Personal life ==
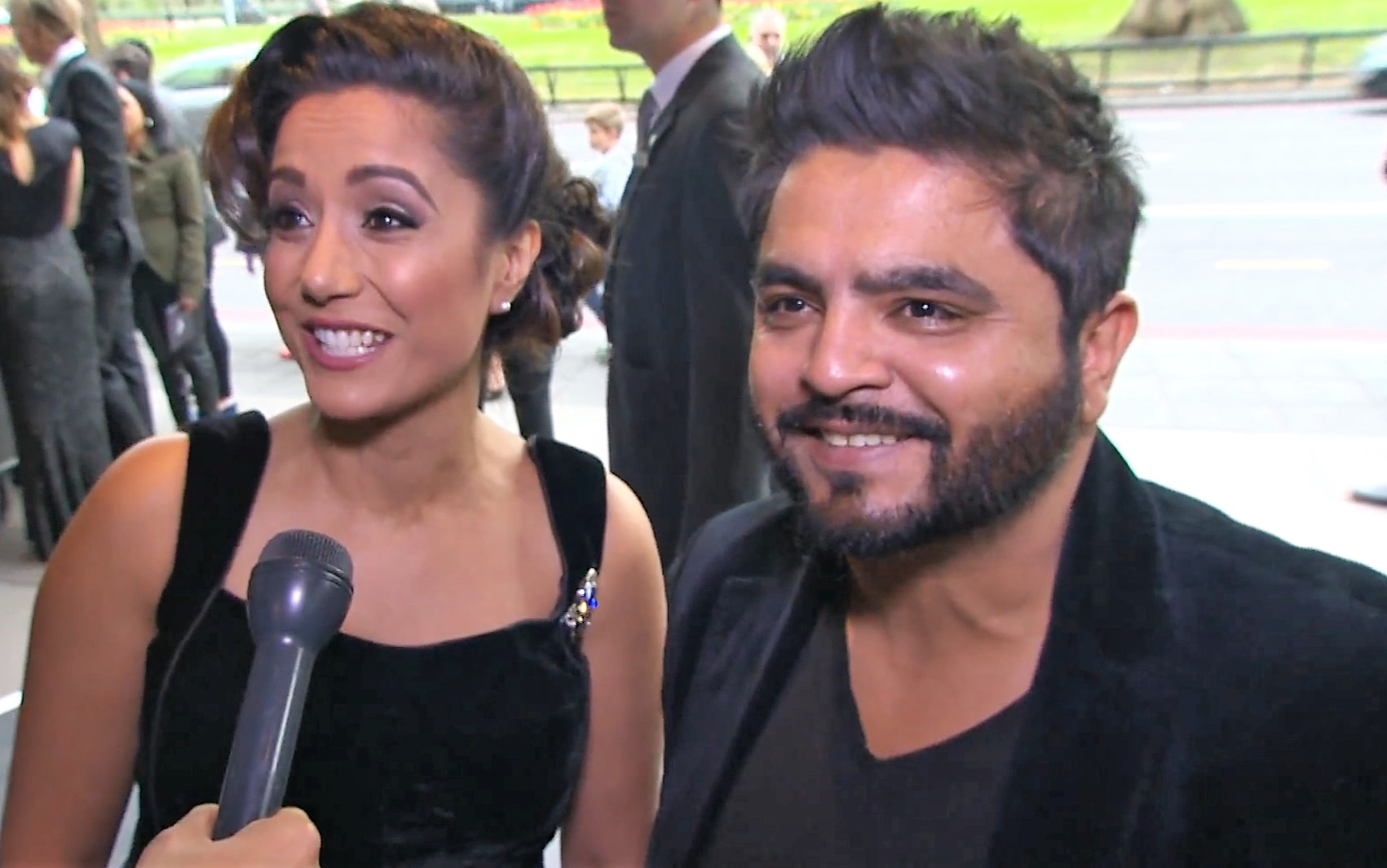
Rich (right), and wife, Manrina Rekhi, at The Asian Awards in 2015

In September 2011, he married Manrina Rhode, a dentist. They are now divorced as of 2019.

In February 2014, Rich signed to TRMG Teddy Riley Music group and moved to Atlanta in April 2014 to work alongside Teddy Riley after acquiring OnlyChild Records from Manchester-based producer, SP.

== Discography ==
=== Rishi Rich solo albums ===
- Simply Rich (2002) (Ishq Records)
- The Project (2006) (2point9 Records)
- The Lost Beats (2014) (Musicbyrr)
- The Lost Beats Vol 2 (2020) (Musicbyrr)

=== Singles ===
- "Nahin Tere Jeha Hor Disda" (2002), featuring Javeed Bashir
- "Nahin Jeena" (2002), featuring Juggy D and Don D
- "Dance with You (Nachna Tere Naal)" (2003), featuring Jay Sean and Juggy D [UK#12]
- "U 'n' I (Mere Dil Vich Hum Tum)" (2004), Rishi Rich featuring Juggy D and Veronica
- "Push It Up (Aaja Kuriye)" (2006), featuring Jay Sean and Juggy D
- "Fade Away (Yaad Naal Jeena)" (2009), Navin Kundra featuring Rishi Rich and Jay Sean
- "Drain" (2014), featuring Ray J and Sahyba
- "Freak" (2015), featuring Jay Sean and Juggy D
- "Ik Tera Pyar" (2016), Master Saleem featuring Rishi Rich
- "Dil Kya Kare (Did I Love You?)" (2016), featuring Amrit Dasu
- "Zindagi" (2016), with H-Dhami
- "Diamond Jewel" (Rishi Rich Remix) (2016), featuring Mumzy Stranger, Lyan Roze and Yash Narvekar
- "Maula" (2018), Farhan Saeed featuring Rishi Rich
- "Get Down" (2018), Juggy D featuring Rishi Rich and Ikka
- "Kanipatu" (2020), Rishi Rich and Yashraj
- "Nakhre" (2020), Jay Sean and Rishi Rich
- "The Ishq (Rishi Rich Remix)" (2022), Jasmine K Kara and Rishi Rich

=== Compilations and remix albums ===
- King of Hearts Queen of Hearts Vol. 1
- King of Hearts Queen of Hearts Vol. 2
- Love 2 Love 2000 – Chapter 6
- Playback
- Pure Garage – Chapter 1
- Pure Garage – Chapter 2
- Pure Garage – Chapter 3
- Playback 2
- Gift 2 U
- Let the Music Play – "2005"
- Bombay Mix – CD 1

== Awards and nominations ==
- 2017: Nominated, Filmfare Award for Best Music Director for Half Girlfriend along with Mithoon, Tanishk Bagchi, Farhan Saeed, Ami Mishra & Rahul Mishra.
- 2018: Won, Best Soundtrack at the UK Asian Film Festival for Boogie Man
- 2025: Won, Special Award for Contribution to Music at the Asian Achievers Awards

== See also ==
- List of British Sikhs
