= Veronica Mehta =

Veronica
- Born: London
- Genres: R&B, Bollywood, bhangra
- Years active: 1996–present

Veronica Mehta, is a British singer and songwriter based in London, UK.

== Career ==
She was featured on the track "Sambhala Hai Meine". Veronica began her singing career when she teamed up with Rishi Rich to form VR1, a band and production unit that experimented with traditional Asian music, remixing, and giving vocals an R'n'B twist.

After VR1, Veronica joined ePark / Urbanstar and released the single "Girls Gotta Have Fun". Veronica has recorded a few tracks with her new management record company 2Point9, "Indian Girl" featuring Hard Kaur, and "U 'n' I (Mere Dil Vich Hai)", from the Yash Chopra film Hum Tum.

Veronica's first album, Theen, was released in 2005. "Hey Ya" (featuring Juggy D) was the only single released from the album. In 2006, Veronica won "Best Female Act" at the UK Asian Music Awards. After almost a 3-year gap, she released her third single "Soniya". Veronica released her second album, Rush, in 2010.

Veronica was affected by breast cancer in 2016. She has taken initiative to end the stigma about breast cancer in society.

In 2024, Veronica set up her own independent record label "Viz Pop Records" on which she released her track “Gone”.Through the lyrics she spoke about her battle through breast cancer and how she felt through this tough period of time.

== Discography ==
=== Albums ===
- Theen (2005)
- Rush (2010)

=== Compilation appearances ===
- King of Hearts Queen of Hearts Vol. 1
- King of Hearts Queen of Hearts Vol. 2
- Love 2 Love 2000 - Chapter 6
- Playback
- Pure Garage - Chapter 1
- Pure Garage - Chapter 2
- Pure Garage - Chapter 3
- Playback 2
- Gift 2 U
- Let the Music Play - "2005"
- Bombay Mix - CD 1

=== As featured artist ===
- "U 'n' I" by Juggy D ft. Veronica and Rishi Rich
- "Ne Ajaa Ve" by H-Dhami and Mehta from Breakaway
