= Juggy D =

English singer

Jagwinder Dhaliwal ਜਗਵਿੰਦਰ ਧਾਲੀਵਾਲ
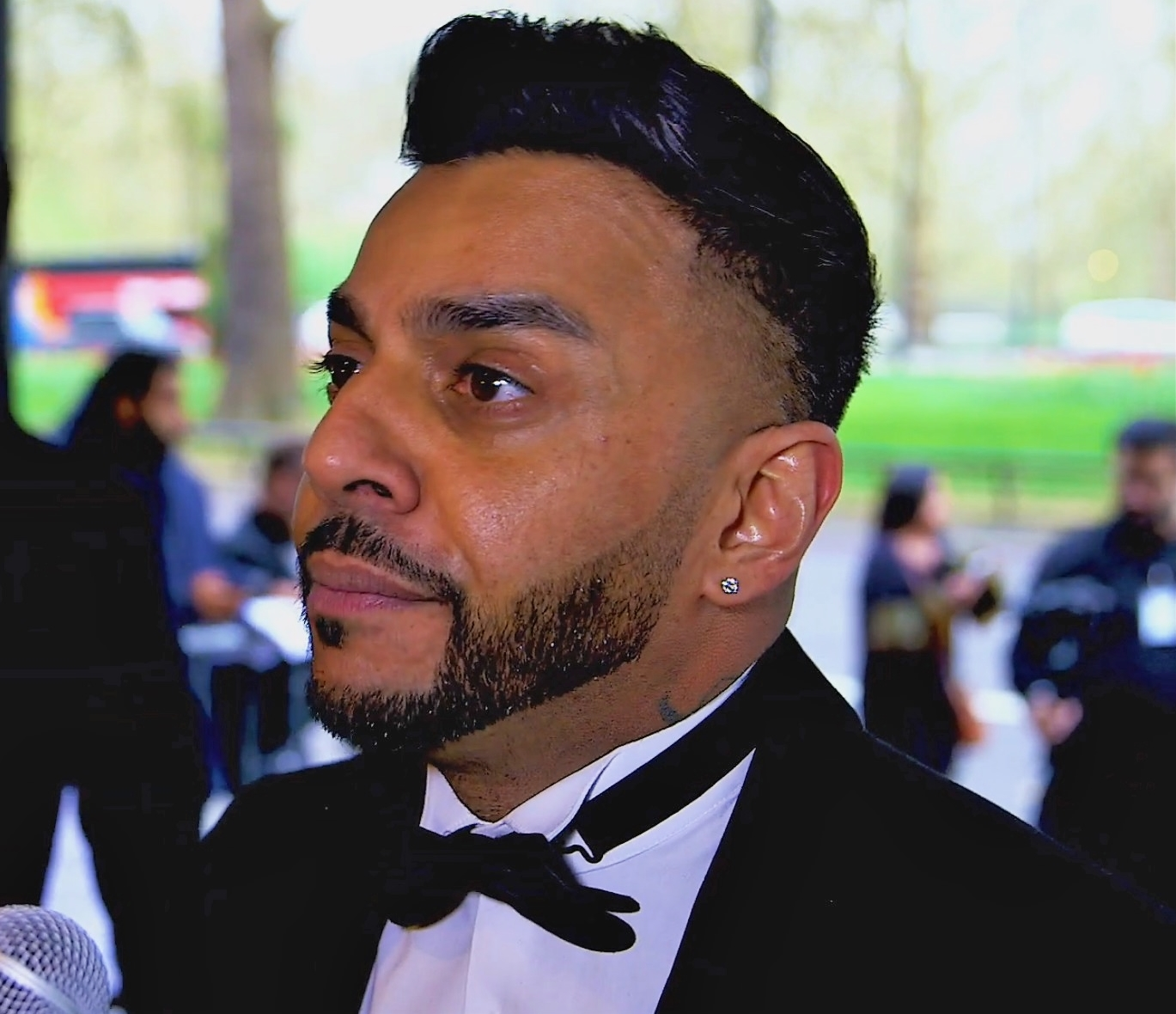
- Juggy D at The Asian Awards in 2019

Background information
- Also known as: Juggy D
- Born: Jagwinder Singh Dhaliwal; 19 November 1981 (age 44); Southall, London, England
- Genres: Bhangra; Punjabi; R&B
- Years active: 1997–present
- Label: Rishi Rich Productions

Jagwinder Singh Dhaliwal (Punjabi: ਜਗਵਿੰਦਰ ਸਿੰਘ ਧਾਲੀਵਾਲ, born 19 November 1981), is an English singer of Indian descent from Southall, London.

== Music ==
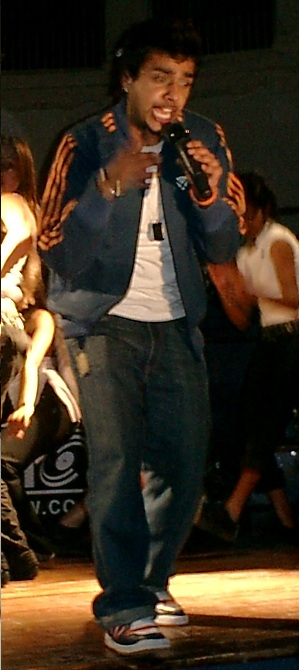
Juggy D performing in Oxford in 2006

Juggy D has been performing since the age of 14. He made his breakthrough alongside Jay Sean. Juggy D has also appeared on numerous crossover singles with musicians such as Madonna, Ricky Martin, Mary J. Blige and Craig David.

Juggy D has collaborated with Veronica Mehta and Rishi Rich in the Bollywood film Hum Tum. He, Mehta, and Jay Sean also have guest appearances in the Hindi film Kyaa Kool Hai Hum. They sing the Jay Sean song "One Night," featuring added vocals from Veronica. He also is one of the first people to experiment with Bhangraton. Juggy D's debut album, Juggy D, was released in 2004 and became the first Punjabi language album to enter the UK national charts. A version of the song "Sohniye" from the album is also featured in the 2004 Bollywood film Shukriya: Till Death Do Us Apart.

Juggy D's single "Come Closer" features the guest vocals of Jin Au-Yeung, a Chinese American rapper from the Ruff Ryders stable.

Juggy D collaborated with Bhangra group, DCS on the song "Oh Jaan Meri Yah", which can be found on DCS's album, Desi Culture Shock.

In 2006, Juggy D won "Best Act" at the UK Asian Music Awards.

In 2019 he won Best Collaboration at Brit Asia TV Music Awards for "Dance", with F1rstman, H Dhami, Mumzy and Raxstar.

== Film work ==
In 2006, Juggy D, made a cameo appearance in the Britflick Cash and Curry playing a drug dealer named "Jimmy".

== Discography ==
=== Albums ===
- Juggy D (2004) - [UK#70]
- Juggy D 2: Punjabi Rockstar (2012)
- Juggy D 2: Punjabi Rockstar 2 (2018)

=== Singles ===
- "Nahin Jeena" (2002), feat. Rishi Rich and Bally Sagoo
- "Dance with You (Nachna Tere Naal)" (2003), feat. Jay Sean and Rishi Rich [UK#12]
- "Sohniye" (2004), feat. Rishi Rich
- "Billo" (2004)
- "Push It Up (Aaja Kuriye)" (2006), feat. Jay Sean and Rishi Rich
- "Khol Aaja (Come Closer)" (2007), feat. Jin Au-Yeung
- "Oh Jaan Meri Yah" (2007), feat. DCS
- "Billiyan Akhiyan" (2014), Music: Tigerstyle and song taken from "Surjit Bindrakhia"
- "Freak" (2015), feat. Jay Sean and Rishi Rich
- "Get Down" (2018), feat. Rishi Rich and Ikka
- "Dance" (2019), feat Firstman, H Dhami, Mumzy Stranger and Raxstar
- "UB1" (2022), feat Sting-A-Man, Music: Amit Rai

=== Film soundtracks ===
- "Balle Balle", feat. Veronica Mehta and Rishi Rich, in Bride and Prejudice (2004)
- "U 'n' I", feat. Veronica Mehta and Rishi Rich, in Hum Tum (2004)
- "Dil Mera (One Night)", feat. Jay Sean and Veronica Mehta, in Kyaa Kool Hai Hum (2005)
- "Mubarakan (Title Song)", with Yash Narvekar, Badshah and Sukriti Kakar, in Mubarakan (2017)

=== Remixes ===
- "Rise & Fall" (Rishi Rich Desi Kulcha Remix) (2003) - Craig David featuring Juggy D
- "Spanish" (Rishi Rich Desi Kulcha Remix) (2003) - Craig David featuring Juggy D
- "Me Against the Music" (Rishi Rich's Desi Kulcha Remix) (2003) - Britney Spears and Madonna featuring Juggy D
- "Love @ 1st Sight" (Rishi Rich Vocal Remix) (2003) - Mary J. Blige featuring Method Man and Juggy D
- "I Don't Care" (Rishi Rich Remix) (2005) - Ricky Martin featuring Amerie, Fat Joe and Juggy D

=== Cameo appearances ===
- "Nahin Tere Jeha Hor Disda" (2002), by Rishi Rich
- "Me Against Myself" (2004), by Jay Sean
- "Eyes on You" (2004), by Jay Sean feat. Rishi Rich

== See also ==
- Bohemia
- Indian pop
- Jazzy B
