= Jay Sean discography =

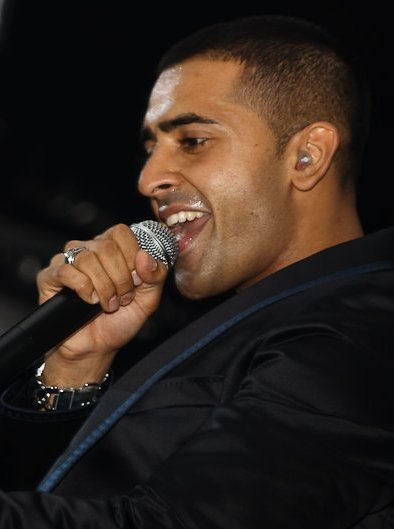
- Studio albums: 4
- Extended plays: 3
- Compilation albums: 3
- Singles: 54
- Music videos: 33

British singer Jay Sean has released four studio albums, three compilation albums, three extended plays, three mixtapes, fifty-four singles (including nine as a featured artist) and thirty-one music videos.

== Albums ==
=== Studio albums ===
List of albums, with selected chart positions and certifications
Title	Details	Peak chart positions								Certifications
Title	Details	UK	UK R&B	UK Ind.	AUS	BEL (FL)	FRA	JPN	US	Certifications
Me Against Myself	Released: 8 November 2004; Label: 2Point9, Relentless, Virgin; Formats: CD, digital download	29	—	—	—	—	—	—	—	BPI: Silver
My Own Way	Released: 12 May 2008; Label: Jayded, 2Point9; Formats: CD, digital download	6	1	—	—	—	—	68	—	BPI: Silver
All or Nothing	Released: 23 November 2009; Label: Jayded, 2Point9, Cash Money, Universal Republic; Formats: CD, digital download	62	11	2	57	85	168	37	37	BPI: Gold; RMNZ: Platinum
Neon	Released: 30 July 2013; Label: Cash Money, Universal Republic; Formats: CD, digital download	105	—	—	72	176	—	199	116	
"—" denotes items that did not chart or were not released.

=== Compilation albums ===
Title	Details	Peak chart positions
Title	Details	JPN
Hit the Lights (Note: Indian version includes tracks from All or Nothing, a new version of "War" and two remixes of "Hit the Lights". Japanese version consists of tracks from All or Nothing and So High.)	Released: 12 August 2011 (India); 18 January 2012; Label: Universal Music India; Universal Japan; Format: CD, digital download	—
Greatest Hits	Released: 22 February 2012 (JPN); Label: Victor Entertainment; Format: CD, digital download	166
So High (Japan Edition)	Released: 26 December 2012 (JPN); Label: Cash Money, Universal (Japan) International; Format: CD, digital download	173
"—" denotes items that did not chart or were not released.

=== Mixtapes ===
Title	Details
The Mistress (Note: Songs also have the music video "Where Do We Go")	Released: 6 September 2011
The Mistress II (Note: Songs also have the music video "Take That Off", "Tears in the Ocean", "All I Want" and "Jameson")	Released: 18 November 2014
M3	Released: 24 December 2020

== Extended plays ==
Title	Details
iTunes Live: London Festival '08	Released: 4 August 2008; Label: Jayded, 2Point9; Format: digital download
So High – EP	Released: 12 October 2012 (AU); Label: Cash Money; Format: digital download
The Mistress II – EP	Released: 26 December 2014; Label: Kamouflage Entertainment; Format: digital download

== Singles ==
=== As lead artist ===
List of singles as lead artist, with selected chart positions and certifications, showing year released and album name
Title	Year	Peak chart positions											Certifications	Album
Title	Year	UK	UK R&B	AUS	CAN	FRA	GER	IRE	NLD	NZ	SWI	US	Certifications	Album
"Eyes on You"	2004	6	2	—	—	—	—	—	18	—	—	—		Me Against Myself
"Stolen"	2004	4	2	—	—	—	—	—	—	—	—	—		Me Against Myself
"Ride It"	2008	11	1	—	—	—	—	—	—	—	—	—	BPI: Gold	My Own Way
"Maybe"	2008	19	3	—	—	—	—	—	—	—	—	—		My Own Way
"Stay"	2008	59	7	—	—	—	—	—	—	—	—	—		My Own Way
"Tonight"	2009	23	5	—	—	—	—	—	—	—	—	—		My Own Way
"Down" (featuring Lil Wayne)	2009	3	1	2	3	17	9	10	17	2	8	1	BPI: 2× Platinum; ARIA: 2× Platinum; BVMI: Gold; RIAA: Diamond; RMNZ: 4× Platinum	All or Nothing
"Do You Remember" (featuring Sean Paul and Lil Jon)	2010	13	10	7	11	13	—	23	—	11	—	10	BPI: Platinum; ARIA: Platinum; RIAA: 2× Platinum; RMNZ: 2× Platinum	All or Nothing
"2012 (It Ain't the End)" (featuring Nicki Minaj)	2010	9	—	40	23	—	—	44	—	9	—	31	BPI: Silver; RMNZ: Gold; RIAA: Gold	Non-album singles
"Hit the Lights" (featuring Lil Wayne)	2011	67	22	18	68	—	62	—	—	24	—	18		Non-album singles
"Where Do We Go"	2011	—	—	—	—	—	—	—	—	—	—	—		The Mistress
"I'm All Yours" (featuring Pitbull)	2012	—	—	13	53	107	40	—	—	22	—	85	ARIA: 2× Platinum	Neon
"So High"	2012	—	—	47	—	—	100	—	—	—	—	—		Neon
"Where You Are"	2013	—	—	—	82	—	—	—	—	—	—	—		Neon
"Mars" (featuring Rick Ross)	2013	—	—	—	—	—	—	—	—	—	—	—		Neon
"Make My Love Go" (featuring Sean Paul)	2016	49	7	—	—	—	22	65	14	—	48	—	BPI: Silver; BVMI: Gold; NVPI: Platinum	Non-album singles
"Do You Love Me"	2017	—	—	—	—	—	—	—	—	—	—	—		Non-album singles
"What You Want" (featuring Davido)	2017	—	—	—	—	—	—	—	—	—	—	—		Non-album singles
"With You" (featuring Gucci Mane and Asian Doll)	2019	—	—	—	—	—	—	—	—	— (Note: "With You" did not enter the NZ Top 40 Singles Chart, but peaked at number 30 on the NZ Hot Singles Chart.)	—	—	RMNZ: Gold	Non-album singles
"Changing" (featuring Sickick)	2020	—	—	—	—	—	—	—	—	—	—	—		Non-album singles
"Nakhre" (with Rishi Rich)	2020	—	—	—	—	—	—	—	—	—	—	—		Non-album singles
"Happiness Days"	2021	—	—	—	—	—	—	—	—	—	—	—		Non-album singles
"Gone (Da Da Da)" (with Imanbek)	2023	—	—	—	—	—	—	—	—	—	—	—		Non-album singles
"Days Like This" (with Martin Jensen)	2023	—	—	—	—	—	—	—	—	—	—	—		Non-album singles
"Tu Hi Tu"	2023	—	—	—	—	—	—	—	—	—	—	—		Non-album singles
"Ride It" (with Larissa Lambert)	2023	—	—	—	—	—	—	—	—	—	—	—		Non-album singles
"Heartless" (featuring Ikky)	2024	—	—	—	—	—	—	—	—	—	—	—		
"Piche Piche" (featuring Jai Dhir)	2024	—	—	—	—	—	—	—	—	—	—	—		
"Call You Mine"	2024	—	—	—	—	—	—	—	—	—	—	—		
"Last Call"	2025	—	—	—	—	—	—	—	—	—	—	—		
"Time"	2025	—	—	—	—	—	—	—	—	—	—	—		
"Pulling Me Back"	2026	—	—	—	—	—	—	—	—	—	—	—		Bait
"All We Know"	2026	—	—	—	—	—	—	—	—	—	—	—		
"Body"	2026	—	—	—	—	—	—	—	—	—	—	—		
"—" denotes a recording that did not chart or was not released in that territory.

=== As featured artist ===
List of singles as featured artist, with selected chart positions and certifications, showing year released and album name
Title	Year	Peak chart positions										Album
Title	Year	UK	AUS	CAN	GER	NLD	NZ	US	US Pop	US Rap	US Latin	Album
"Dance with You (Nachna Tere Naal)" (Rishi Rich featuring Jay Sean and Juggy D)	2003	12	—	—	—	2	—	—	—	—	—	Rishi Rich Project
"Push It Up (Aaja Kuriye)" (Rishi Rich featuring Jay Sean and Juggy D)	2006	—	—	—	—	—	—	—	—	—	—	The Project
"Deal with It" (Corbin Bleu featuring Jay Sean)	2007	—	—	—	—	—	—	112	87	—	—	Another Side
"Written on Her" (Birdman featuring Jay Sean)	2009	—	—	—	—	—	—	119	—	17	—	Pricele$$
"Lush" (Skepta featuring Jay Sean)	2009	—	—	—	—	—	—	—	—	—	—	Microphone Champion
"I Made It (Cash Money Heroes)" (Kevin Rudolf featuring Birdman, Jay Sean and Lil Wayne)	2010	37	4	44	—	—	4	21	17	—	—	To the Sky
"Each Tear" (Mary J. Blige featuring Jay Sean)	2010	183	—	—	—	—	—	—	—	—	—	Stronger With Each Tear
"What Happened to Us" (Jessica Mauboy featuring Jay Sean)	2011	—	14	—	—	—	—	—	—	—	—	Get 'em Girls
"Every Little Part of Me" (Alesha Dixon featuring Jay Sean)	2011	78	—	—	—	—	—	—	—	—	—	The Entertainer
"Yalla Asia" (Jay Sean featuring Karl Wolf and Radhika Vekaria)	2011	—	—	—	—	—	—	—	—	—	—	2011 AFC Asian Cup; Theme Song / We Play
"Bebé Bonita" (Chino & Nacho featuring Jay Sean)	2012	—	—	—	—	—	—	—	—	—	1	Supremo
"Back to Love" (DJ Pauly D featuring Jay Sean)	2013	113	—	98	—	—	—	107	—	—	—	Non-album single
"Wild Horses" (Antonia featuring Jay Sean)	2014	—	—	—	—	—	—	—	—	—	—	This Is Antonia
"When You Feel This" (Stafford Brothers featuring Rick Ross and Jay Sean)	2015	—	70	—	—	—	—	—	—	—	—	Non-album single
"Freak" (Rishi Rich featuring Jay Sean and Juggy D)	2015	—	—	—	—	—	—	—	—	—	—	Rishi Rich Project
"Weekend Love" (DJ Antoine featuring Jay Sean)	2016	—	—	—	85	—	—	—	—	—	—	Provocateur
"Thinking About You" (Hardwell featuring Jay Sean)	2016	—	—	—	—	64	—	—	—	—	—	Non-album singles
"Don't Give Up on Me" (Johnny Good featuring Jay Sean)	2017	—	—	—	—	—	—	—	—	—	—	Non-album singles
"Surma Surma" (Guru Randhawa featuring Jay Sean)	2020	— (Note: "Surma Surma" did not enter the UK Singles Chart, but peaked at No. 1 on the UK Asian Music Chart.)	—	—	—	—	—	—	—	—		Non-album singles
"Stop Crying Your Heart Out" (as BBC Radio 2's Allstars)	2020	7	—	—	—	—	—	—	—	—	—	Non-album singles
"—" denotes a recording that did not chart or was not released in that territory.

=== Promotional singles ===
List of promotional singles, showing year released and album name
Title	Year	Album
"Like This, Like That" (featuring Birdman)	2011	Hit the Lights
"Thinking About You"	2016	Non-album singles
"Do You Love Me"	2017	Non-album singles
"Cherry Papers"	2018	Non-album singles

== Guest appearances ==
List of non-single guest appearances, with other performing artists, showing year released and album name
Title	Year	Other artist(s)	Album
"Meri Jaan"	2004	Juggy D	Juggy D
"Stomp"	2006	Rishi Rich, JD (Dready), Mr. Phillips	The Project
"Come Here"	2006	Rishi Rich	The Project
"M.U.R.D.E.R"	2007	Thara	Thara
"Written on Her" (Remix)	2009	Birdman, Flo Rida, Mack Maine	Pricele$$
"Fade Away (Yaad Naal Jeena)"	2009	Navin Kundra, Rishi Rich	none
"Love Dealer"	2010	Esmée Denters, Justin Timberlake	none
"Your Love" (Remix)	2010	Nicki Minaj	none
"What A Night"	2010	Lil Jon, Claude Kelly	none
"That Ain't Me"	2010	Lil Wayne	I Am Not a Human Being
"YMCMB Heroes"	2011	Tyga, Busta Rhymes, Cory Gunz	none
"The One"	2012	Sonu Nigam	The One
"No Tomorrow"	2012	Kylian Mash, Glasses Malone	none
"Promise"	2013	Alex Gaudino	Doctor Love
"Back To Love"	2013	DJ Pauly D	Back To Love EP
"It's Crazy"	2014	Blush	none
"One Night"	2015	DJ Prostyle	none
"Disappear"	2015	Christian Rich	FW14
"Keep on Falling"	2016	DJ Antoine	Provocateur
"Don't Know Why"	2018	Seeb	Nice to Meet You
"Any Day"	2020	Riz Ahmed	The Long Goodbye
"Nakhre"	2020	Rishi Rich	none

== Songwriting credits ==
List of Jay Sean's songwriting credits on albums by other artists
Title	Year	Artist	Album	Notes
"Deal With It"	2007	Corbin Bleu	Another Side	BMI Songwriter Award for Jay Sean
"Juliette"	2009	Shinee	Romeo (EP)	Korean version of "Deal With It"
"That's My Girl"	2010	JLS	Outta This World	
"Superstar"	2011	Big Time Rush	Elevate	
"Moment To Love"	2012	Timomatic	Timomatic	
"Boom Boom"	2012	Justice Crew	Live by the Words	AUS #1, NZ #3 and GER #46. ARIA 6× Platinum, RMNZ 2× Platinum
"Best Night"	AUS #7, NZ #24. ARIA 2× Platinum	Justice Crew	Live by the Words	
"Would U Love Me"	2015	The Janoskians	Would U Love Me (EP)	
"Real Girls Eat Cake"	2015	The Janoskians	Would U Love Me (EP)	AUS #63, UK #37
"Livin' In"	2018	Super Junior D&E	Bout You (EP)	

== Music videos ==
List of music videos, showing year released and director
Title	Year	Director(s)
"Eyes on You"	2004	none
"Stolen"	2004	none
"Me Against Myself"	2006	none
"Ride It"	2007	Richard Pengelley
"Maybe"	2008	Richard Pengelley
"Stay"	2008	Richard Pengelley
"Stay" (Boy Better Know Remix)	2008	Adam Wood
"Tonight"	2009	Richard Pengelley
"Down" (featuring Lil Wayne)	2009	Richard Pengelley
"Do You Remember" (featuring Sean Paul and Lil Jon)	2009	Gil Green
"2012 (It Ain't the End) / Break Ya Back" (featuring Nicki Minaj)	2010	Marcus Raboy
"Yalla Asia" (with Karl Wolf featuring Radhika Vekaria)	2011	Jelle Posthuma
"Hit the Lights" (featuring Lil Wayne)	2011	Bille Woodruff
"Like This Like That" (featuring Birdman)	2011	David Rousseau & Jeffrey A. Panzer
"Where Do We Go"	2011	Derick G.
"I'm All Yours" (featuring Pitbull)	2012	Gil Green
"Sex 101" (featuring Tyga)	2012	Adam Wood
"So High"	2012	Phil the God
"Back To Love"	2013	Rik Cordero
"Where You Are"	2013	Hannah Lux Davis
"Mars" (featuring Rick Ross)	2013	Parris Stewart
"Tears in the Ocean"	2014	Naroop
"All I Want"	2014	Naroop
"Jameson"	2014	Naroop
"Make My Love Go" (featuring Sean Paul)	2016	Naroop
"Do You Love Me"	2017	none
"What You Want" (featuring Davido)	2017	none
"Emergency"	2018	Jamar Harding
"With You" (featuring Gucci Mane and Asian Doll)	2019	Jamar Harding
"With You" (featuring Gucci Mane and Asian Doll)	2019	Jamar Harding
"Nakhre (with Rishi Rich)	2020	none
As featured artist
"Dance with You (Nachna Tere Naal)" (Rishi Rich featuring Jay Sean and Juggy D)	2003	none
"Sohniye" (Cameo) (Juggy D featuring Rishi Rich)	2004	none
"Dil Mera (One Night)" (Rishi Rich featuring Jay Sean, Juggy D and Veronica)	2005	none
"Push It Up (Aaja Kuriye)" (Juggy D featuring Jay Sean and Rishi Rich)	2006	none
"Lush" (Skepta featuring Jay Sean)	2009	none
"Written on Her" (Birdman featuring Jay Sean)	2009	Richard Pengelley
"Money to Blow" (Cameo) (Birdman featuring Drake and Lil Wayne)	2009	Gil Green
"I Made It (Cash Money Heroes)" (Kevin Rudolf featuring Birdman, Jay Sean and Lil Wayne)	2010	Jeff Panzer and David Rousseau
"Each Tear" (Mary J. Blige featuring Jay Sean)	2010	Marcus Raboy
"Every Little Part of Me" (Alesha Dixon featuring Jay Sean)	2011	Nick Frew
"What Happened to Us" (Jessica Mauboy featuring Jay Sean)	2011	Mark Alston
"Original" (Cameo) (Mystikal featuring Birdman and Lil Wayne)	2011	none
"Bebé Bonita" (Chino & Nacho featuring Jay Sean)	2012	Marlon Peña
"Wild Horses" (Antonia featuring Jay Sean)	2014	none
"Just Can't Let Her Go" (Cameo) (Rajiv Dhall)	2015	none
"Freak" (Rishi Rich featuring Jay Sean and Juggy D)	2015	none
"Singles Out" (Cameo) (Candice Craig)	2015	none
"Weekend Love" (DJ Antoine featuring Jay Sean)	2016	Naroop
"Thinking About You" (Hardwell featuring Jay Sean)	2016	none
