= Dancehall pop =

Music genre

- Stylistic origins: Dancehall; dance-pop; R&B; reggae; roots reggae; hip-hop; reggaeton
- Cultural origins: Early 2000s, Jamaica; United States; Canada; United Kingdom

Dancehall pop is a sub-genre of the Jamaican genre dancehall that originated in the early 2000s. Developing from the sounds of reggae, dancehall pop is characteristically different in its fusion with western pop music and digital music production. Dancehall pop is also different from dancehall in that most songs use lesser Jamaican Patois in lyrics––allowing it to be globally understood and consumed. It also incorporates the key pop music elements of having melodies, hooks, and the verse-chorus format. Additionally, the genre moves away from the reggae and roots reggae music origins in social and political protest, now lyrically centering on partying, dancing, and sexuality. By the early 2000s, dancehall pop had its entrance into the global music industry.

== History ==
=== Early developments ===
As the sub-genre of its fathering music style dancehall, dancehall pop combines instrumental reggae and drum patterns of Jamaican sounds with the vocal melodies and catchy lyrics of pop music. The name of the genre itself is also credited to Jamaican music lifestyle, where artists and producers would play music from sound systems in local dancehalls. The socio-political changes after the 1970s government change in Jamaica affected dancehall styles, where lyrics moved away from political protest and more towards partying lifestyle. The dancehall genre trend of reusing beats, also known as “reworking”, is also still evident in dancehall pop as well, with many artists sampling old school dancehall track instrumentals––colloquially known as "riddims".

While dancehall music has its cultural origins in Jamaican sound and music, the dancehall pop genre combines rhythm and sounds from across in the Caribbean including that of soca, calypso and reggaeton. The fusion between dancehall and pop is attributed to the early digitisation of musical production in Jamaica, where the format of pop music––such as the melodic verse-chorus structure and repeated choruses––could be combined with the fast-paced instrumental rhythms of dancehall. Dancehall pop music did not make its mainstream arrival into the music industry until the early 2000s. Dancehall and soca songs such as Kevin Lyttle's "Turn Me On" and Rupee's "Tempted to Touch", both released in 2002 and 2003 respectively, are examples of the early combinations of the digital pop style and Caribbean rhythms into the western music scene. It was dancehall pop artist Sean Paul, who released his second studio album Dutty Rock in 2002, including the hit singles "Get Busy" and "Gimme the Light" that put the genre on highly rated chart positions, with the album reaching a peak position of number 4 on the US Billboard 200. Sean Paul's collaboration on the album with at-the-time rising pop star Beyoncé, titled "Baby Boy", reached number 1 on the US Billboard Hot 100. This marked the beginning of the mainstream dancehall and pop fusion. Barbadian singer-songwriter Rihanna then released her debut dancehall pop single in 2005, "Pon de Replay", which reached number two on the Billboard Hot 100 and UK Singles Chart.

The genre had a small absence from the pop charts and then reemerged again in the 2010s with numerous Caribbean artists such as Kranium, Konshens, and Popcaan entering the dance-pop music charts. As these artists curated their names in the music industry, chart-topping pop artists like Drake, Rihanna, and Major Lazer incorporated the dancehall pop sounds into their respective hit singles "One Dance", "Work", and "Boom" which each gained top 20 spots on the US Billboard Hot 100. Drake's dancehall pop and rap inspired track "One Dance" became a best-selling and chart-topping single, giving credit to the genre within the mainstream music scene. Named as the "song of the summer", the song which features Nigerian afrobeats artist Wizkid and British singer Kyla received 757 million streams on music-streaming service Spotify and spent over two months as number 1 on the Billboard Hot 100, largely contributing to the mass-audience recognition of dancehall pop.

The presence of the dancehall pop sound in mainstream pop music steadily continued into the 2010s, with the emergence of Caribbean artists featuring in Western pop hit songs such as Jamaican singer Kranium's "Can't Believe" featuring American singer Ty Dolla $ign, and British-Jamaican rapper Stefflon Don's "Hurtin' Me" with American rapper French Montana, which both earned top 10 spots on the US Billboard Hot 100.

=== Dancehall pop in the 2000s ===
The dancehall pop style of music began to gain attention in the early 2000s. This new fusion style of dancehall and pop was characterized by the adoption of pop song formatting, including choruses and melodies, and a larger fusion of English and Patois in lyrics. Its early contributing artists include Sean Paul, Rihanna, Beyonce, and Kevin Lyttle. It was Sean Paul's sophomore album, Dutty Rock (2002), that started the trend of the dancehall and pop fusion. Sean Paul's second single off the album, "Get Busy" (2003), became the first dancehall-pop inspired song to reach No. 1 on the US Billboard Hot 100. The song received high acclaim and mainstream success, selling over 2 million copies in the United States, and went on to win Best Reggae Album at the 46th Annual Grammy Awards in 2003. Fellow Caribbean singer Rihanna also incorporated dancehall pop music into her debut album Music of the Sun (2005), with her debut single "Pon de Replay" (2005) being compared to Beyonce and Sean Paul's No. 1 Billboard Hot 100 single "Baby Boy" (2003) because of their combined "dancehall-pop mixture". While the majority of the song's lyrics are in English, the title is written in Rihanna's native Bajan Patois, as well as the vocal tone of the song being dubbed to have a "reggae vocal cadence". This was a nod to the Caribbean roots of dancehall pop existing both within musical style and language. Other Caribbean artists such as Kevin Lyttle, Notch, Rupee, as well as American artists such as Lumidee and Nina Sky, released songs that incorporated dancehall pop rhythms in the 2000s decade.

=== Dancehall pop in the 2010s ===
Dancehall pop gained more mainstream attention throughout the 2010s, with a larger number of western artists releasing and featuring on songs influenced by the genre. Jamaican dancehall and reggae artist Kranium entered the US music charts with his single "Nobody Has to Know" (2013), which featured American singer Ty Dolla $ign, reaching a peak position of #3 on the Billboard Hot 100. Fusions of dancehall pop and electronic dance music begun with Jamie xx's 2015 song, "I Know There's Gonna Be (Good Times)" which featured American rapper Young Thug and Jamaican dancehall artist Popcaan, landing a #35 position on the Billboard Hot 100. In 2015, Jamaican singer OMI's No. 1 single "Cheerleader" was named "song of the summer" by Billboard, remaining on the Billboard Hot 100 for 35 weeks. The crossover of dancehall pop and electronic dance music, alternatively classified as tropical house, continued with British pop-duo AlunaGeorge releasing "I'm in Control" (2016) with featured dancehall artist Popcaan. The track reached a peak position of #18 on the Billboard Hot 100, and #39 on the UK charts.

In 2016, Canadian rapper Drake released his fourth studio album Views, with dancehall pop inspired tracks "One Dance", "Controlla", and "Too Good" which featured Rihanna. Drake's single off the album, "One Dance", remained at No. 1 on the Billboard Hot 100 for 10 weeks and was named the "song of the summer" in 2016, while the fourth single from the album, "Controlla", was infused with Jamaican Patois lyrics and also featured Jamaican dancehall artist Popcaan. Drake has also stated his musical aspirations of adopting the Jamaican dancehall trend of reworking riddims into the R&B and hip-hop genre, where numerous artists may record their own lyrics over the same beat. This trend saw some success in the western music industry, with fellow Canadian rapper Tory Lanez releasing his own rework of Drake's "Controlla", as well as Popcaan, who featured on Drake's original version of the song, reworked another one of Drake's dancehall pop-tropical house inspired tracks, titled "Come Closer".

The 2010s saw various Caribbean artists collaborating with American artists on dancehall pop and tropical house tracks. Popcaan featured on numerous hip-hop songs, female Jamaican dancehall artist Spice featured on American rapper Kid Ink's "Nasty" (2016), self-proclaimed "king of dancehall" Beenie Man featured on British rap duo Krept & Konan's "Freak of the Week" (2015), and Chris Brown featured on Konshens' 2016 hit "Bruk Off Yuh Back". Rihanna continued this trend with her number one single "Work" (2016), which featured Drake. The song reached number one on the US Billboard Hot 100 for nine weeks, and it placed within the top 5 for music charts in the UK and Australia. Billboard author Taj Rani noted that the hit single reintroduced dancehall pop back into the mainstream American music industry, with the last dancehall track by a native Caribbean to hit number one being Sean Paul's 2006 hit, "Temperature". Rihanna's lyrics in the song are sung almost entirely in a slurred form of Barbadian Patois, matching the official music video visuals which is set in a Caribbean-style club, in which Rihanna wears a dress with Rastafarian colours. The singer, who won the 2016 VMA's Michael Jackson Video Vanguard award––given to artists who have successfully influenced the culture and art of the music industry––performed a medley of her famous dance hits, including "Work" (2016), "Rude Boy" (2009), and "What's My Name" (2010), each reworked onto famous ragga songs. The performance was called an "homage to her Caribbean roots", with a background of dancers wearing club-inspired clothing and casual party choreography performing in what resembled a Caribbean dance hall.

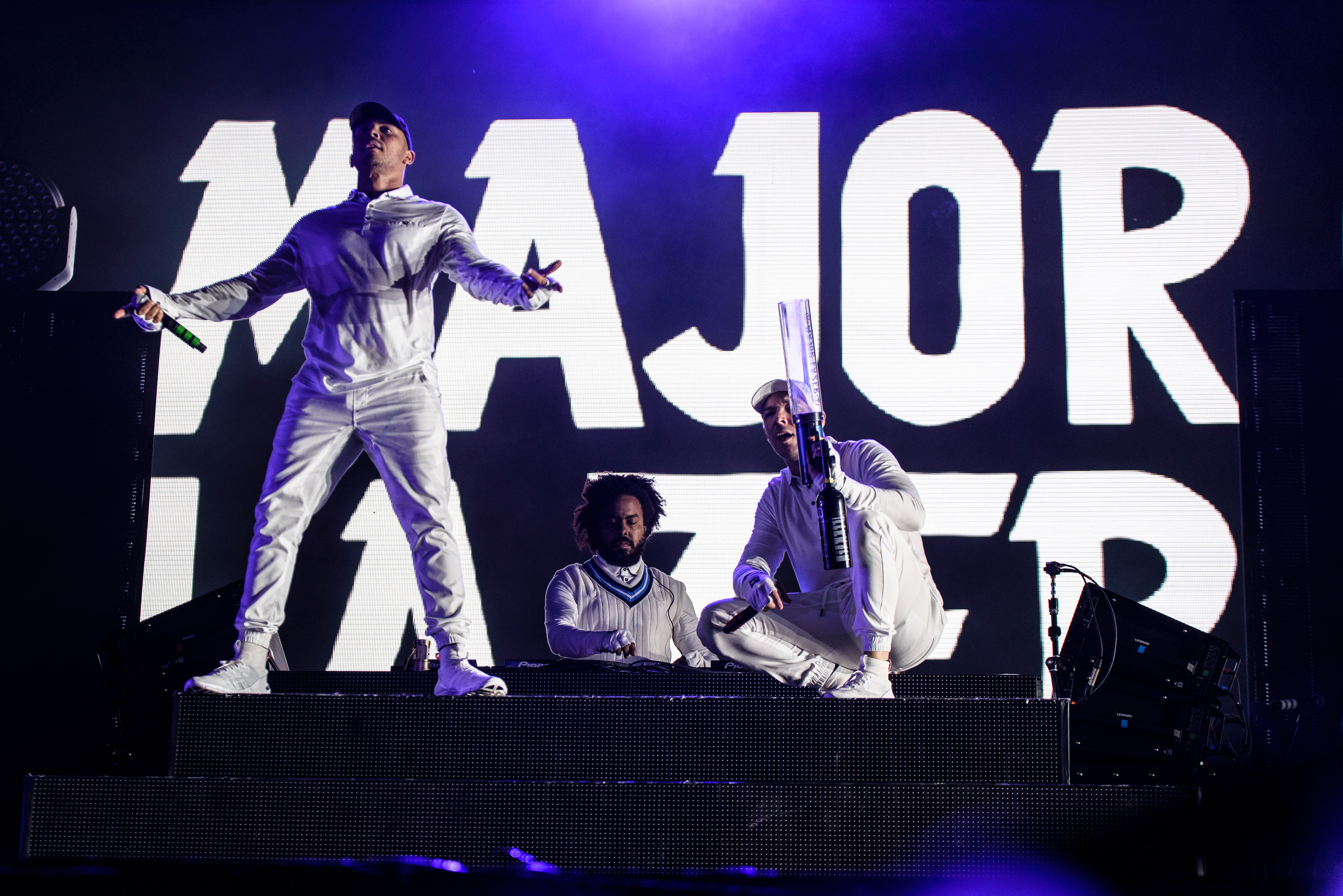
Electronic dance music trio Major Lazer and its members: Diplo, Jillionaire, and Walshy Fire

The fusion of electronic dance music and dancehall pop arose in the 2010s under the name "tropical house", a term coined by Australian DJ Thomas Jack in 2014. Tropical house is characterised by its steady 120 beats per minute, using slower rhythms from the dancehall, reggae, and soca genres to create a "melo island vibe". Pop hit "Sorry" (2016) by Canadian singer Justin Bieber was listed as a "tropical house" dance track by US magazine Rolling Stone because of its "tonal similarities" to some Caribbean music. Electronic dance music artists such as Kygo, Skrillex, and Major Lazer have all been identified as tropical house artists who utilise digitised instrumental rhythms from dancehall and soca––such as "synthesized pan flutes and marimbas". The electronic dance trio Major Lazer, consisting of American DJ Diplo, Trinidadian DJ Jillionaire, and Jamaican-American DJ Walshy Fire, are seen as "genre-blending" DJs who draw inspiration from dancehall rhythms, aiming to introduce international waves of music to a mainstream audience. The trio released multiple dancehall pop and tropical house tracks featuring mainstream pop stars, the most popular being "Lean On" (2015) featuring Danish singer MØ and "Cold Water" (2016) featuring Justin Bieber, which both earned top 3 spots on the US Billboard Hot 100. The genre has also received critiques for being a "whitewashed" genre that has appropriated the sounds of dancehall and reggae without recognising its Jamaican history.

== Characteristics ==
Dancehall pop adopted the instrumental "drum and bass lines" that were originally taken from reggae music accompaniment. The trend of voice-over ad-libs, mostly in the form of talking rather than singing, has remained a distinct characteristic in both dancehall and the dancehall pop music style that grew from DJs in Jamaican dance halls playing instrumental reggae tracks. The boom in digital production technology is one of the factors which led to the dancehall fusion with pop, in which multiple producers can remix, recreate, and access various types of sounds. This digitisation has allowed the trend of sampling and interpolating old dancehall and reggae riddims to continue into modern dancehall pop music, combining the pop melody and song format. For example, the 1993 hit dancehall single "Murder She Wrote" by Chaka Demus & Pliers has been interpolated multiple times to form chart-topping singles such as Omarion and Chris Brown’s "Post to Be", Nicki Minaj and French Montana's "Freaks", and Jason Derulo's "Too Hot". While such songs maintain dancehall melodies, they adopt the verse-chorus and hook format used in most pop songs.

Lyrics in dancehall songs are usually written and sung using both English and Jamaican patois. To make dancehall pop music easily understood, Jamaican patois is used lesser in songs that feature western pop artists that release music in English. Popular patois slang terms that have become popularised as a result of cultural attributes absorption into pop culture, and rising multiculturalism, are continuously incorporated into dancehall pop songs. Rihanna's number 1 single "Work" is almost entirely sung in a combination of the singer's native Bajan patois and English, with Canadian rapper Drake's following hook incorporating elements of patois into his verse as well. Popular patois slang, adopted from languages across the Caribbean, such as "ting", "man dem", and "dun know" are now found in lyrics outside the dancehall and dancehall pop genres, most often in hip-hop and rap music.

=== Language and slang ===
Dancehall pop retains it Jamaican cultural roots despite its mainstream reach, and this is visible in the infusion of Jamaican patois lyrics that are used in lyrics for both Caribbean and non-Caribbean artists. Patois words themselves are used often by native Caribbean singers such as Rihanna, Sean Paul, and Kranium in their lyrics. Caribbean slang, which is described as "hybridised diasporic slang" by US magazine FADER author Eternity Martis, has become popularised by mainstream media and adopted into the colloquial language globally as a result of "cultural prevalence" and the rising popularity of dancehall genres themselves. Canadian rapper Drake has been criticised numerous times for his casual use of patois slang in his daily life and song lyrics. Drake's usage of Jamaican patois has been explained as a result of the large communities of Jamaicans in Toronto, in which the large diasporic presence has resulted in a fusion into modern lifestyle. The scale of integration between slang terms and Jamaican patois has been attributed to the survival of Jamaican and Caribbean culture over time, as well as the growing popularity of the music from the region. Sean Paul has also claimed that patois may be a barricade for the potential global popularity of the dancehall genre, where artists who sing in "hardcore patois" create a language barrier for non-Patois speaking consumers. The criticism Rihanna received when her single "Work" (2016) released shared similar sentiments, where numerous magazine tabloids and social media platforms negatively critiqued her use of Barbadian patois.

== Criticism ==
=== Whitewashing and cultural appropriation ===
Non-Caribbean artists involved in the dancehall pop-tropical house genre has been criticised for whitewashing and cultural appropriation. Canadian rapper Drake has been targeted as a "culture vulture", for appropriating the slang, rhythms, and artists of dancehall––as well as the UK Grime scene––without proper accreditation to its upcoming artists and cultural history. Drake has been criticised numerous times for his casual imitation of a Jamaican accent in his music, as well as his "profiting" of popular cultures during their times of mainstream recognition. However, Drake's usage of Jamaican slang has been attributed to his Toronto roots, where a large diaspora of Jamaicans exist and influence urban culture. The rapper has also given credit to Vybz Kartel as a musical influence of his. Tropical house artists such as Kygo, Thomas Jack, Duke Dumont have also been critiqued for their classification of their music production into tropical and deep house genres, with critics claiming their sounds have been derived from dancehall and reggae roots. Pop culture magazine tabloids such as Rolling Stone have also faced criticism for classifying dancehall pop songs "Work" (2016) and "One Dance" (2016) as "tropical house-flavoured". FUSE author Bianca Gracie claims that this genre title of "tropical house" suggests the rhythms and musical style originated in Europe, and disconnects the cultural connection to Jamaica. Bianca Garcie also stated that the critiques of Rihanna's Bajan lyrics to "Work" (2016) were wrongly turned into online memes.

== See also ==
- Stop Murder Music
