= So High =

So High may refer to:

- So High (EP), by Jay Sean, 2012
  - "So High" (Jay Sean song), 2012
- "So High" (Doja Cat song), 2014
- "So High" (Ghost Loft song), 2013
- "So High" (Jamelia song), 1999
- "So High" (John Legend song), 2005
- "So High" (Slim Thug song), 2010
- "So High", a song by Blind Melon from For My Friends, 2008
- "So High", a song by Mist featuring Fredo, 2019
- "So High", a song by Ruben, 2019
- "So High", a song by Sidhu Moose Wala and Byg Byrd from the film Mar Gaye Oye Loko, 2018
- "So High", a song by Six60 from Six60, 2015
- "So High", a song by Jaguar Wright from Divorcing Neo 2 Marry Soul, 2005

== See also ==
- "I'm So Hi", a song by Three 6 Mafia from When the Smoke Clears: Sixty 6, Sixty 1, 2000
- "I'm So High", a song by Kylie Minogue from Light Years, 2000
- "She's So High", a song by Tal Bachman, 1999
- "She's So High" (Blur song), 1990
