= Dance Central (2010 video game) =

2010 video game

- Developer: Harmonix
- Publisher: MTV Games
- Director: Kasson Crooker
- Producer: Naoko Takamoto
- Designer: Dean Tate
- Programmer: Marc Flury
- Artist: Dare Matheson
- Writer: Helen McWilliams
- Series: Dance Central
- Platform: Xbox 360
- Release: NA: November 4, 2010; EU: November 10, 2010; AU: November 18, 2010; JPN: June 2, 2011
- Genre: Rhythm
- Modes: Single-player, multiplayer

Dance Central is a 2010 rhythm game developed by Harmonix and published by MTV Games for the Xbox 360 Kinect. It is the first installment in the Dance Central series. It was released on November 4, 2010, in most areas and on June 2, 2011, in Japan.

A sequel to the game, titled Dance Central 2, was released for the Xbox 360 Kinect in October 2011.

== Gameplay ==
Dance Central features an on-screen character who players are meant to mirror. In addition to ratings, the game also provides feedback by outlining the character's limbs in red to show what part of their body the player is not moving correctly.

Dance Central is a motion-based dance video game in which players mirror a dance performed by an on-screen character. On the right side of the screen are flashcards of the previous two moves, the move currently being performed, and the next two moves in the routine. Players can earn one of four ratings depending on their accuracy: "X", "Almost", "Nice", and "Flawless". The ratings a player earns can influence the venue in which the character is dancing; earning a consecutive amount of "Nice" or "Flawless" ratings darkens most background elements and adds neon lights, while earning a consecutive amount of "Almost" or "X" ratings results in the venue becoming dull and the music becoming muffled. The moves in each routine are influenced by the difficulty rating they are listed under and the skill level the player chooses. Initially, only the Easy difficulty is available, but Medium and Hard can be unlocked by earning at least 4 Stars in the previous skill level. Each song features a freestyle section in which players have the chance to be photographed by the Kinect's camera as they dance however they desire. Each rating provides a point value that can be increased with a score multiplier, which is raised by earning consecutive high ratings and lowered by earning low ratings. Stars are earned at specific point thresholds that vary depending on the skill level a player selects, and up to 5 Stars can be earned, with the maximum rating being 5 Gold Stars. Earning Stars unlocks content for the game such as new venues, new characters, and new outfits for characters who are already available. In addition to Perform It!, the main mode of the game, there is a Break It Down mode in which a player can practice a routine's moves and a Dance Battle mode in which two players dance one at a time in competition for the highest score.

== Characters ==
Dance Central features ten different characters. Eight of them are available from the start while two are unlockables. Each character, with the exception of Ttiw Tolrep, has a main outfit and an alternate outfit, which can be unlocked by earning 25 Stars with them (or, for ELIOT, reaching the "Living Legend" rank).

- Angel: A Latin lover who seeks romantic attention from women.
- Miss Aubrey: A very confident and snooty queen bee.
- Emilia: An athletic woman who frequently works out at the gym.
- Dare: A British, pink-haired clubber who enjoys partying.
- MacCoy: A man with an interest in old school hip-hop and technology.
- Mo: A friendly man who occasionally enjoys joking around.
- Oblio: A mysterious, poetic man.
- Taye: A self-assured, outspoken woman.
- ELIOT: A robot who represses his robot roots and swears he is human. He can be unlocked by earning at least 4 Stars and over in the Grand Finale challenge or reaching the Living Legend rank.
- Ttiw Tolrep: (later known as Shinju in the sequel) A silent ninja who wears pink and carries nunchuks. He cannot be selected in the character roster and is unlocked by entering ←↑X↑→Y (spelling "luxury") at the title screen using the Xbox 360 Controller.

== Story ==
While there is no story mode in the game, there are two cutscenes in the game that suggest a story.

In the opening cutscene, Mo is promoting a club in various different areas of a city. This catches the attention of multiple characters, who decide to attend the club. In the closing cutscene, Mo stops at a phone booth, picks up the phone, and talks to someone on behalf of the club. After hanging up the phone, the platform underneath him takes him to the club, which is revealed to be Dr. Tan's Estate. While most of the characters in attendance are partying, Oblio is sitting against a wall with a disgruntled expression. He eventually leaves the club and rides away on his motorcycle. The scene is rewound and replayed repeatedly before it is revealed that Dr. Tan has him under surveillance alongside various areas of the city. Intrigued by what he is seeing, he turns off the rest of the screens, smirks, and laughs hysterically.

== Songs ==
Dance Central features a soundtrack consisting of 32 songs. Each song has a default dancer associated with it that can be changed before starting the song.

Song	Artist	Year	Default Dancer
"Body Movin' (Fatboy Slim Remix)"	Beastie Boys	1998	Oblio
"Brick House"	Commodores	1977	MacCoy
"Bust a Move"	Young MC	1989	Mo
"C'mon N' Ride It (The Train)"	Quad City DJ's	1996	Dare
"Can't Get You Out of My Head"	Kylie Minogue	2001	Miss Aubrey
"Crank That (Soulja Boy)"	Soulja Boy Tell 'Em	2007	Mo
"Days Go By"	Dirty Vegas	2001	MacCoy
"Dip It Low"	Christina Milian	2004	Taye
"Don't Sweat the Technique"	Eric B. & Rakim	1992	MacCoy
"Down"	Jay Sean ft. Lil Wayne	2009	Angel
"Drop It Like It's Hot"	Snoop Dogg	2004	Taye
"Evacuate the Dancefloor"	Cascada	2009	Emilia
"Flava In Ya Ear (Remix)"	Craig Mack	1994	Taye
"Funkytown"	Lipps Inc	1980	Miss Aubrey
"Galang '05"	M.I.A.	2005	Dare
"Hella Good"	No Doubt	2002	Oblio
"Hey Mami"	FannyPack	2003	Miss Aubrey
"I Know You Want Me (Calle Ocho)"	Pitbull	2009	Angel
"Jungle Boogie"	Kool & the Gang	1973	MacCoy
"Just Dance"	Lady Gaga	2008	Dare
"King of the Dancehall"	Beenie Man	2004	Angel
"Maneater"	Nelly Furtado	2006	Emilia
"Move Ya Body"	Nina Sky	2004	Emilia
"Poison"	Bell Biv DeVoe	1990	Angel
"Poker Face"	Lady Gaga	2008	Mo
"Pon de Replay"	Rihanna	2005	Emilia
"Pump Up the Jam"	Technotronic	1989	Dare
"Push It"	Salt-n-Pepa	1987	Taye
"Rendez-Vu"	Basement Jaxx	1999	Miss Aubrey
"Rump Shaker"	Wreckx-n-Effect	1992	Oblio
"Satisfaction"	Benny Benassi Presents The Biz	2002	Oblio
"Teach Me How To Jerk"	Audio Push	2009	Mo

=== Challenges ===
Challenges are a combination of songs mixed together as one. They are typically unlocked once the player earns at least 4 Stars on each song in a certain difficulty category. The skill levels for challenges can be unlocked in the same way as regular songs, but can also be unlocked by earning the minimum amount of Stars needed for each song on higher skill levels. Unlike regular songs, Break It Down is not available for challenges. There are eight challenges, seven of which focus on songs categorized under a certain difficulty and one of which contains songs from every difficulty category. The last challenge, the Grand Finale Challenge, is unlocked by earning at least 4 Stars on every other Challenge. Completing it unlocks Eliot (if players have not done so already) and Dr. Tan's Estate.

=== Downloadable content ===
Players can purchase additional songs as downloadable content (DLC).

Song	Artist	Year	Release date	Default Dancer
"Because of You"	Ne-Yo	2007	November 4, 2010	Mo
"I Got You Dancing"^{b}	Lady Sovereign	2009	November 4, 2010	Dare
"Temperature"	Sean Paul	2006	November 4, 2010	Angel
"Whoomp! (There It Is)"	Tag Team	1993	November 23, 2010	Dare
"I Gotta Feeling"	The Black Eyed Peas	2009	November 23, 2010	Emilia
"Word Up"	Cameo	1986	November 23, 2010	MacCoy
"Control"^{a}	Janet Jackson	1986	December 21, 2010	Taye
"Girls and Boys"^{b}	Blur	1994	December 21, 2010	Oblio
"Disturbia"	Rihanna	2008	December 21, 2010	Miss Aubrey
"We Run This"	Missy Elliott	2006	February 15, 2011	Emilia
"Le Freak"	Chic	1978	February 15, 2011	Dare
"Super Freak"	Rick James	1981	February 15, 2011	Miss Aubrey
"Heard 'Em All"	Amerie	2009	February 15, 2011	Taye
"Weapon of Choice"	Fatboy Slim	2001	March 15, 2011	Oblio
"Hollaback Girl"	Gwen Stefani	2005	March 15, 2011	Taye
"Straight Up"	Paula Abdul	1988	March 15, 2011	Miss Aubrey
"Turnin Me On"	Keri Hilson	2008	March 15, 2011	Emilia
"Wild Thing"	Tone-Loc	1988	April 18, 2011	Taye
"Lean wit It, Rock wit It"	Dem Franchize Boyz ft. Peanut & Charlay	2006	April 19, 2011	Emilia
"D.A.N.C.E."	Justice	2007	April 19, 2011	MacCoy
"Fergalicious"	Fergie ft. will.i.am	2006	May 17, 2011	Emilia
"Informer"	Snow	1993	May 17, 2011	MacCoy
"Lapdance"	N.E.R.D. ft. Lee Harvey & Vita	2001	May 17, 2011	Oblio
"Say Aah"	Trey Songz ft. Fabolous	2010	July 19, 2011	Oblio
"Break Your Heart"	Taio Cruz ft. Ludacris	2010	July 19, 2011	Dare
"Planet Rock (Original 12" Version)"^{b}	Afrika Bambaataa & The Soul Sonic Force	1982	July 19, 2011	Mo
"Get Up (I Feel Like Being a), Sex Machine Pt. 1"	James Brown	1970	August 16, 2011	Maccoy
"Get Busy"	Sean Paul	2003	August 16, 2011	Taye
"Get It Shawty"	Lloyd	2007	August 16, 2011	Angel
"Don't Cha"	The Pussycat Dolls featuring Busta Rhymes	2005	September 20, 2011	Miss Aubrey
"Tempted to Touch"	Rupee	2004	September 20, 2011	Angel
"The Way I Are"	Timbaland ft. Keri Hilson	2007	September 20, 2011	Mo

^aFree with Best Buy code.

^bNo longer available for purchase.

== Legacy ==
In the Arcade from the Asian Attractions in the Expo 2011, the Dance Central arcade was named "Dance Hero".

== Reception ==
Reception

Aggregate scores
Aggregator	Score
GameRankings	83.22%
Metacritic	82/100

Review scores
Publication	Score
1Up.com	A−
Eurogamer	8/10
GamePro	4.5/5
GameSpot	8.5/10
GamesRadar+	8/10
GameTrailers	8.1/10
Giant Bomb	4/5
IGN	8/10

=== Critical reception ===
Dance Central received positive reviews from critics. It received a score of 83.22% on GameRankings and 82/100 on Metacritic. It received a rating of 8/10 from IGN and a rating of 8.5/10 from GameSpot. Video game talk show Good Game: Spawn Point gave the game an 8 out of 10 calling it the best launch game for the Kinect and a step forward for dance games. They said workout mode was a nice addition which will definitely give you a workout and the Dance Battles would be a big hit at parties. Nintendo of America President Reggie Fils-Aimé was impressed, and said in an interview that "Dance Central is, by far, the best Kinect game". During the 14th Annual Interactive Achievement Awards, the Academy of Interactive Arts & Sciences awarded Dance Central with "Family Game of the Year"; it also received nominations for "Outstanding Achievement in Gameplay Engineering", "Outstanding Achievement in Soundtrack", and "Outstanding Innovation in Gaming".

== Sales ==
Dance Central sold 2.5 million copies.
