= Hit the Lights (disambiguation) =

Hit the Lights are an American pop punk band.

Hit the Lights may also refer to:

- "Hit the Lights" (Metallica song), from Kill 'Em All, 1983
- Hit the Lights (India Tour Edition), a 2011 compilation album by Jay Sean
- Hit the Lights (Japan Edition), a 2011 compilation album by Jay Sean
- "Hit the Lights" (Jay Sean song), 2011
- "Hit the Lights" (Selena Gomez & the Scene song), 2012
