= Neon (Jay Sean album) =

Studio album by Jay Sean
- Released: 26 July 2013
- Recorded: 2010–2013
- Genres: Pop; R&B; hip hop
- Length: 52:50
- Labels: Cash Money; Republic
- Producer: OFM

Jay Sean chronology
All or Nothing (2009)	Neon (2013)

Singles from Neon
- 1. "Where You Are" Released: 19 March 2013; 2. "Mars" Released: 16 July 2013

Neon is the fourth studio album by British R&B singer Jay Sean. The album was released in the UK on 26 July 2013 by Cash Money Records and distributed by Republic Records. The album features guest appearances from Busta Rhymes, Ace Hood and Rick Ross.

== Background ==
Jay Sean began working on his fourth album and second with Cash Money Records under the name Freeze Time in July 2010. At the time, he stated that he had completed roughly 75 percent of the album and that guests included Lil Wayne, Pitbull and Nicki Minaj. Sean also co-headlined with Joe Jonas on the Joe Jonas & Jay Sean Tour with JoJo as the opening act. Sean released a mixtape titled The Mistress in September 2011 and a Japan exclusive album titled Hit the Lights in January 2012.

But in February 2012, during an interview with Clevvermusic, when Jay Sean was asked about his long delayed fourth studio album he said "Let me tell you what happened with, Freeze Time. I curse myself with it because it got frozen in time and didn't come out." He further added "and guess what, I've changed the name and scrapped it; I'm done with Freeze Time; I'm over Freeze Time. The album is coming out which is done, finito, in a few months".

In February 2013, Jay Sean announced he would be changing the title of the album again from Worth It All to Neon. In April 2013, it was announced that the album had been pushed back from 21 May 2013, until 25 June 2013. In June 2013, the album was pushed back again until 23 July 2013. On 28 June 2013, Jay Sean announced on his official Facebook page that the album would finally be released on 30 July 2013, with the iTunes pre-order being available on 16 July 2013. In addition, he also announced the album's track listing and revealed the album cover.

== Recording and production ==
In July 2011, during an interview with Rap-Up TV, Jay Sean told about the next album and working with Pharrell. He said "We did three songs together over the last couple of weeks for my new album". He further praised Pharrell saying "While music is changing so much, he's keeping up with the trends, but he's still making sure he doesn't let go of what makes his music his music. It's got that unique Pharrell sound." In February 2012, Jay Sean told Diana Madison of HollyscoopTV about the collaboration with Lupe Fiasco. He further added about the collaboration with Pitbull on the track "I'm All Yours" which also served as the first single from the album.

In July 2012, Jay Sean told MTV News about his second single of his upcoming album. He mentioned a collaboration with Afrojack. The song is said to be titled "So High" and should act as another club banger. Sean further stated "The song 'So High' is just ridiculous. Afrojack is such an amazing producer," he said. "Again, he lives in the clubs. He knows what works. So when it comes to actually producing, he knows what's gonna have an impact in the club". In October 2012, Jay Sean released an EP available only on the Australian iTunes Store with the three songs and an exclusive bonus track "Patience". Recently Sean stated during a live Ustream that the album's guests would include Sean Paul, Busta Rhymes, Lil Wayne, Ace Hood and Rick Ross.

== Singles ==
The original first single from the album was announced to be "I'm All Yours", which features rapper Pitbull. The song had its radio premiere on 18 April 2012. The track was officially released to US radio on 22 May 2012 and digital retailers on 29 May 2012. The song peaked at 85 on the US Billboard Hot 100. The song's best performance was in Australia where it peaked at 13 and was certified as Platinum. On 20 July 2012, "Sex 101", featuring Tyga was released on iTunes as a promotional single from the album.

The second promotional single for the album was titled "So High", which was produced by Afrojack and was released on 17 October 2012. In February 2013, the previous singles were announced to just be buzz tracks and that the first official single from the album was titled "Where You Are" was released to iTunes and Mainstream radio on 19 March 2013. The official music video for "Where You Are" premiered on Fuse three days later. On 17 May 2013, Sean premiered the second single, "Mars" which features rapper Rick Ross. On 29 July 2013, the music video was released for "Mars" featuring Rick Ross.

== Reception ==
=== Critical response ===
Professional ratings
Aggregate scores
Source	Rating
Metacritic	62/100
Review scores
Source	Rating
AllMusic	3/5 stars
Entertainment Weekly	A−
The Guardian	2/5 stars
Idolator	2.5/5 stars
Rolling Stone	2/5 stars

Neon was met with generally favourable reviews from music critics. Kyle Anderson of Entertainment Weekly rated the album an A− grade, stating that "Neon feels confident and complete" with "all the thrills of the best Chris Brown songs". Kathy Iandoli of Vibe gave the album a positive review, saying "Neon is perhaps Jay Sean's most cohesive work, due to its lack of compromise. Every song is arguably a hit, without seeming forced. That's a huge feat for an artist who spent the first half of his career appeasing one audience and the other half speaking to an entirely different demographic. While his next moves have to be his best moves, Jay Sean has another hit project to add to his arsenal." Fred Thomas of AllMusic gave the album three out of five stars, saying "Much of Neon feels like Sean and his production crew are scrounging around for a hit, trying their luck with everything from saccharine pop to generic club bangers and even a reggae-tinged number, "Sucka for You." As someone whose success has come mostly as a singles artist, Jay Sean fails to deliver anything quite as charismatic as any of his greatest hits on Neon, leaving the album feeling largely flat."

Killian Fox of The Guardian gave the album two out of five stars, saying "Four years in the making, two title changes, numerous collaborations announced and redeployed or never fully realised: the fourth album from west London R&B singer Jay Sean has had such a difficult conception, you'd expect it to bear some interesting scars from its labours. Not so many. Neon is a smooth, proficient pop product that steers clear of conflict or strong emotions unless they have to do with matters of the heart. The presence of rappers Ace Hood and Busta Rhymes ups the ante slightly in the later stages of the album, but for the most part Neon is as safe and inoffensive as its namesake gas." Caryn Ganz of Rolling Stone gave the album two out of five stars, saying "Long delays rarely mean good things for pop albums, and Jay Sean's fourth LP hasn't exactly been ripening like a fancy fromage over the past four years. The British smoothie sold more than 4 million copies of his 2009 single "Down," which featured Lil Wayne, but a lot of adventurous new R&B has arrived in the interim. Compared with Drake, Frank Ocean or Miguel, Neon is R&Beige – full of boy-band blahs and acoustic guitars ("Guns and Roses"), and limpid love songs ("Luckiest Man"). Jay Sean works his fluttery falsetto alongside Rick Ross on "Mars" and finds a serviceably sexy jam with "All on Your Body," which features Ace Hood, but even at its best, Neon barely flickers."

=== Commercial performance ===
The album debuted at number 116 on the Billboard 200 chart, with first-week sales of 3,608 copies in the United States.

== Track listing ==
Neon track listing
No.	Title	Writer(s)	Length
1.	"Neon"	Jay Sean, Jeremy Skaller, Khaled Rohaim, Jamil Chammas, Justin Lucas, Ameerah Roelants	3:38
2.	"Luckiest Man"	Sean, Nasri Atweh, Skaller, Robert Larow, Rohaim	3:23
3.	"Words"	Sean, Skaller, Jared Cotter, Larow, Rohaim, Anthony Hannides, M. Hannides	4:27
4.	"Where You Are"	Sean, Skaller, Rohaim, Cotter, Roelants, Jon Perkins	3:12
5.	"Guns and Roses"	Sean, Brian Seals, Dewain Whitmore	3:34
6.	"Mars" (featuring Rick Ross)	Sean, Cotter, A. Hannides, M. Hannides, Skaller, Rohaim, William Roberts II, Larow	3:12
7.	"Miss Popular"	Sean, Skaller, Larow, Rohaim, Sam Hook	4:24
8.	"Close to You"	Sean, Cotter, A. Hannides, M. Hannides, Rohaim, Skaller	3:46
9.	"Deep End"	Sean, Cotter, Skaller, Rohaim	3:31
10.	"Worth It All"	Sean, Skaller, Whitmore, Jr., Rohaim	3:32
11.	"Passenger Side"	Sean, Skaller, Rohaim, Larow	3:12
12.	"All on Your Body" (featuring Ace Hood)	Sean, Timothy Thomas, Theron Thomas, Rohaim, Skaller, Antoine McColister	2:49
13.	"Break of Dawn" (featuring Busta Rhymes)	Sean, Timothy Thomas, Nic Martin, Skaller, Trevor Smith, Jr.	2:54
14.	"Sucka for You"	Sean, Dwayne Chin-Quee, Cotter, Skaller	3:04
Total length:			48:38

iTunes Store bonus track
No.	Title	Writer(s)	Length
15.	"Universe"	Sean, Jeremy Most	4:12

India iTunes Store bonus track
No.	Title	Length
15.	"Back to Love (Aaja Re)"	4:38

Japanese edition bonus tracks
No.	Title	Length
15.	"So High"	3:40
16.	"2012 (It Ain't the End)" (featuring Nicki Minaj)	3:42
17.	"I'm All Yours" (featuring Pitbull)	3:38

== Charts ==
Chart performance for Neon
Chart (2013)	Peak position
Australian Albums (ARIA)	72
Belgian Albums (Ultratop Flanders)	176
Japanese Albums (Oricon)	199
UK Albums Downloads (OCC)	88
US Billboard 200	116

== Release history ==
Release history and formats for Neon
Region	Date	Format(s)	Label
United Kingdom	26 July 2013	Digital download	Cash Money, Republic
India	29 July 2013	Digital download	Cash Money, Republic
United States	30 July 2013	Digital download	Cash Money, Republic
Japan	4 September 2013	Digital download, CD	Cash Money, Republic
China	20 March 2014	CD	Starsing Records
