= Thara (album) =

Studio album by Thara
- Released: 2007
- Recorded: 2005–06
- Genre: R&B, pop, hip-hop
- Label: Desert Storm Records
- Producer: J Remy and Bobby Bass

Singles from Thara
- 1. "Maybe (Don't Be Afraid)" Released: 21 April 2009

Thara is the debut self-titled album by American R&B singer Thara, released in 2007. The album features collaborations with Fatman Scoop, John Legend and Jay Sean.

== Background ==
In the album, with Jeremy Skaller as the producer, Thara worked with Fabolous, John Legend, Kanye West, Rodney Jerkins, and The Neptunes among others. The album features the hit, Jump On, with Fatman Scoop, and a duet which Thara co-wrote with John Legend, Maybe.

Following the release of the album, Thara toured throughout Australia, the UK, and Germany.

== Track listing ==
No.	Title	Writer(s)	Producer(s)	Length
1.	"Maybe (Don't Be Afraid)" (featuring John Legend)	John Stephans, Thara, J Skaller, R Larow	J Remy and Bobby Bass for OFM	3:18
2.	"Push Up On Me" (featuring Rupee)	Thara, R Larow, J Skaller, Edwin Serrano, Eritz Laues, Rupee	J Remy and Bobby Bass for OFM	3:40
3.	"Jump On" (featuring Fatman Scoop)	Thara, J Saller, R Larow, M Riddick, Ken lfill, Fat Man Scoop	J Remy and Bobby Bass for OFM and DURO for Chairman of the Boards	3:25
4.	"Give It A Chance" (featuring HIRO)	Thara, G Adams, J Skaller, R Larow, K lfill, Justin Murray, Hiro	J Remy and Bobby Bass for OFM and DURO for Chairman of the Boards	4:17
5.	"What The Girls Talk About" (featuring Daytona)	Thara, J Skaller, R Larow, Daytona	J Remy and Bobby Bass for OFM	4:48
6.	"Can't Be Around You"	J Skaller, R Larow, M Riddick	J Remy and Bobby Bass for OFM	3:52
7.	"M.U.R.D.E.R" (featuring Jay Sean)	Thara, Jay Sean, Jared Cotter, J Skaller, R Larow	J Remy and Bobby Bass for OFM	3:59
8.	"Out Of My System"	Thara, R Larow, J Skaller, Edwin Serrano, P Smith	J Remy and Bobby Bass for OFM	3:26
9.	"Pretty Song"	Thara, J Skaller, R Larow	J Remy and Bobby Bass for OFM	3:22
10.	"So Sexy"	J Skaller, R Larow, Makeba Riddick	J Remy and Bobby Bass for MusicOFM	3:11
11.	"Stay"	Thara, M Riddick, J Skaller, R Larow, Duro	J Remy and Bobby Bass for OFM	3:29
12.	"Tell Me"	Thara, J Skaller, R Larow	J Remy and Bobby Bass for OFM and DURO for Chairman of the Boards	4:09
13.	"Break My Heart"	Edwin Serrano, Eritza Laues, J Skaller, R Larow, Devin Parker	DLP, J Remy and Bobby Bass for OFM	3:15
14.	"Push Up On Me (Holosound's Push It Remix)" (featuring Rupee)	Thara, R Larow, J Skaller, Edwin Serrano, Eritz Laues, Rupee	J Remy and Bobby Bass for OFM	3:38
15.	"Push Up On Me (Shlavens And D Iav Sexy Mix)" (featuring Rupee)	Thara, R Larow, J Skaller, Edwin Serrano, Eritz Laues, Rupee	J Remy and Bobby Bass for OFM	4:04
