= Luckiest Man =

Luckiest Man may refer to:

- "Luckiest Man", a 2022 song by Chris Brown from Breezy
- "Luckiest Man", a 2013 song by Jay Sean from Neon
