= Dance Central 2 =

2011 video game

- European box art
- Developer: Harmonix
- Publisher: Microsoft Studios
- Series: Dance Central
- Platform: Xbox 360
- Release: PAL: October 21, 2011; NA: October 25, 2011
- Genre: Rhythm
- Modes: Single-player, multiplayer

Dance Central 2 is a 2011 rhythm game developed by Harmonix and published by Microsoft Studios for the Xbox 360 Kinect. It is the sequel to Dance Central (2010) and the second installment in the Dance Central series. It was released on October 21, 2011, in PAL regions and on October 25 in North America.

A sequel to the game, titled Dance Central 3, was released for the Xbox 360 Kinect in October 2012.

== Gameplay ==
Gameplay of the Dance Battle mode introduced in Dance Central 2

The core gameplay in Dance Central 2 is similar to its predecessor, where players mimic the characters' dances with on-screen Flashcards for guidance. The game has been largely revamped compared to its predecessors, including adding multiplayer, adding voice commands, and enhancing the Break It Down feature. The Freestyle section, while still available, can also be disabled within the game. If done, additional moves will appear in the game as a replacement, creating one uninterrupted routine depending on the mode used. A story campaign has been added via Crew Challenge, in which players can unlock new content.

There are five modes available in Dance Central 2:

- Perform It: A standard mode where players can dance to routines in the game. This mode can be played with one or two players and allows one person to swap in and out while the other is playing if desired. Both players do not have to play the same difficulty, but the difficulty must be set prior to the routine starting.
- Dance Battle: A head-to-head mode between two players to see who is the best. Players go through a song, with two interloops mixed in. One of them focuses on one player doing the routine as the other player is temporarily disabled, and the other involves the players nailing moves from the routine to earn extra points. In that interloop, up to four moves can pop up at any time, and some are marked in gold, indicating more points. Like in Perform It, the players do not have to play on the same difficulty.
- Break It Down: A training mode that allows the player to learn the routines in the game. The mode has been enhanced from the previous game, allowing the player to pick certain moves to focus on and record themselves dancing to moves to compare themselves to the dancers on-screen.
- Crew Challenge: A campaign mode that gives a player a chance to reach for the top by impressing the game's dance crews. Successfully dancing to each crew's challenge song, once unlocking it, gives the player the opportunity to represent them, and the more reps earned, the higher the notability will be.
- Fitness: A workout mode that tracks calories, with an indicator of how many have been burned along with the amount of time spent in the mode towards the top when enabled. There are also pre-made playlists available, along with customizable ones that can be made outside the mode for use in Fitness.

The game features six venues for the player to dance in: High Tide, Set Adrift, Tee Off, Lowdown, Penthaüs, and The Airship. All of them are available from the start except for Penthaüs, which is unlocked by clearing The Glitterati's campaign in Crew Challenge, and The Airship, which is unlocked by completing Crew Challenge once. Venues can be changed before the player starts a routine.

== Plot ==
The player encounters several different dance crews throughout the game's story campaign, starting with Riptide Crew at High Tide, Flash4wrd at Tee Off, Lu$h Crew at Set Adrift, and Hi-Def at Lowdown. They are given a chance to join the crew after someone in the crew has heard of their potential, with more people talking about them the further along they are in the story. After the player impresses them with their dancing skills, they are welcomed into the crew and given a crew card. As they are collecting crew cards, members of the various crews warn them about The Glitterati, another dance crew that is seen unfavorably by the others. When the player encounters The Glitterati, their talent is doubted at first, but after they impress the crew with their dancing, they are given The Glitterati's crew card as well.

After meeting and joining all five previous crews, the player is taken to The Airship, where they meet Dr. Tan. He reveals that he has been monitoring their every move and introduces them to D-Cypher, a crew of robots he has created himself. The goal of their creation is to battle the player and defeat them so Dr. Tan can conquer the dancing world. Once D-Cypher is defeated, both members of the crew shut off and The Airship begins to fall apart. Enraged, Dr. Tan gives a lengthy monologue about how he will not give up before escaping with a hysterical laugh.

== Characters ==
Dance Central 2 features eighteen playable characters, each divided up into pairs as a crew, with six of them being returning playable characters from Dance Central. Upon release, ten characters were available from the start and six could be unlocked. After release, four more unlockable characters were added following a Facebook campaign.

- Riptide Crew: Includes Emilia from Dance Central and Bodie.
- Flash4wrd: Includes Taye from Dance Central and Li'l T.
- Lu$h Crew: Includes Miss Aubrey and Angel, both from Dance Central.
- Hi-Def: Includes Mo from Dance Central and Glitch.
- Icon Crew: Includes Marcos and Frenchy. Added on March 2, 2012. Unlockable by logging into Xbox Live before starting the game.
- Ninja Crew: Includes Shinju from Dance Central and Kichi. Added on May 1, 2012. Unlockable by logging into Xbox Live before starting the game.
- The Glitterati: Includes Kerith and Jaryn. Unlockable by completing The Glitterati's campaign in Crew Challenge.
- D-Cypher: Includes CYPH-78 and CYPH-56. Unlockable by completing the Crew Challenge once.
- D-Cypher Elite: Includes Dr. Tan and CYPH-ELITE. Unlockable by completing the Crew Challenge on every difficulty.

Most characters feature alternative outfits separate from their main outfits (known as their "Crew Look") to wear during gameplay. These alternative outfits are labeled as "Street Style", and are unlocked by earning 36 Stars collectively on songs associated with the character's crew. Additionally, all returning player characters from Dance Central have a third outfit labeled "DC Classic". These outfits are ones they wore in the previous game, and they are unlocked by entering cheat codes in the "Redeem Code" section (excluding Mo, whose DC Classic outfit is unlocked by importing songs from Dance Central).

== Soundtrack ==
=== Songs ===
There are 44 songs featured in Dance Central 2. A light blue background indicates that the song must be unlocked by completing the final challenge song of the associated crew in the Crew Challenge.

Song	Artist	Year	Default Dancer
"Baby Got Back (Mix Mix)"	Sir Mix-a-Lot	1992	Emilia
"Bad Romance"	Lady Gaga	2009	Kerith
"Body to Body"	Electric Valentine	2011	Jaryn
"Born This Way"	Lady Gaga	2011	Kerith
"Bulletproof"	La Roux	2009	Miss Aubrey
"Club Can't Handle Me"	Flo Rida ft. David Guetta	2010	Emilia
"Conceited (There's Something About Remy)"	Remy Ma	2005	Taye
"DJ Got Us Fallin' in Love"	Usher ft. Pitbull	2010	Emilia
"Fire Burning"	Sean Kingston	2009	Miss Aubrey
"Get Ur Freak On"	Missy Elliott	2001	Taye
"Goodies"	Ciara ft. Petey Pablo	2004	Taye
"Grenade"	Bruno Mars	2010	Angel
"Hot Stuff"	Donna Summer	1979	Li'l T.
"I Like It"	Enrique Iglesias ft. Pitbull	2010	Emilia
"I Wish for You"	EXILE	2011	Mo
"Impacto (Remix)"	Daddy Yankee ft. Fergie	2007	Taye
"Last Night"	Diddy ft. Keyshia Cole	2006	Miss Aubrey
"Like a G6"	Far East Movement	2010	Jaryn
"Mai Ai Hee (Dragostea Din Tei)"	O-Zone	2003	Glitch
"Massive Attack"	Nicki Minaj ft. Sean Garrett	2010	Bodie
"Meddle"	Little Boots	2008	Kerith
"My Prerogative"	Bobby Brown	1988	Bodie
"Nothin' on You"	B.o.B ft. Bruno Mars	2009	Angel
"Oops (Oh My)"	Tweet ft. Missy Elliott	2002	Jaryn
"Reach"	Atlantic Connection and Armanni Reign	2011	Bodie
"Real Love"	Mary J. Blige	1992	Miss Aubrey
"Right Thurr"	Chingy	2003	Li'l T.
"Rude Boy"	Rihanna	2010	Taye
"Run (I'm a Natural Disaster)"	Gnarls Barkley	2008	Mo
"Sandstorm"	Darude	1999	Kerith
"Satellite"	Lena	2010	Jaryn
"Sexy Chick"	David Guetta ft. Akon	2009	Mo
"Somebody to Love"	Justin Bieber	2010	Mo
"Technologic"	Daft Punk	2005	Mo
"The Breaks"	Kurtis Blow	1980	Angel
"The Humpty Dance"	Digital Underground	1990	Bodie
"This Is How We Do It"	Montell Jordan	1995	Glitch
"Toxic"	As Made Famous By Britney Spears	2004	Jaryn
"Turn Me On"	Kevin Lyttle	2003	Angel
"Venus"	Bananarama	1986	Miss Aubrey
"What Is Love"	Haddaway	1993	Emilia
"Whip My Hair"	Willow	2010	Li'l T.
"Yeah!"	Usher ft. Lil' Jon & Ludacris	2004	Glitch
"You're a Jerk"	New Boyz	2009	Glitch

=== Importing ===
Songs from the first Dance Central, including its downloadable content (DLC), can be played in Dance Central 2. DLC will automatically be available in Dance Central 2 if it was previously purchased for Dance Central, but the on-disc songs must be imported via the Import Pack. This could be done by redeeming the code printed in the Dance Central manual in-game. The Import Pack costed US$5.00 (400 Microsoft Points prior to August 26, 2013) and required an Xbox Live gamertag to download. Players who purchased the Import Pack also received Mo's "DC Classic" outfit as a bonus.

As of October 25, 2016, imports from Dance Central have been discontinued. However, players who purchased the Import Pack prior to its discontinuation can still access its content.

=== Downloadable content ===
In addition to DLC from the first Dance Central game, Dance Central 2 also features additional DLC on the Xbox Live Marketplace. Most DLC songs were released individually for US$2.99 (240 Microsoft Points prior to the currency's discontinuation), but some songs were released exclusively in "Dance Packs" containing multiple songs for higher prices. These packs also sometimes contain songs that are purchasable individually, but at a lower price per song.

The Xbox 360 Store had been shut down on July 29, 2024, making DLC for Dance Central 2 no longer available for purchase afterwards.

Song title	Artist	Year	Default Dancer	Release date	Dance Pack
"Marry the Night"	Lady Gaga	2011	Jaryn	November 22, 2011	
"The Edge of Glory"	Lady Gaga	2011	Miss Aubrey	November 22, 2011	
"What's My Name"	Rihanna ft. Drake	2010	Taye	December 20, 2011	
"S&M"	Rihanna	2011	Jaryn	December 20, 2011	
"Only Girl (In the World)"	Rihanna	2010	Li'l T.	December 20, 2011	
"Closer"	Ne-Yo	2008	Mo	January 10, 2012	11
"Don't Touch Me (Throw da Water on 'Em)"^{a}	Busta Rhymes	2008	Bodie	January 17, 2012	11
"Gonna Make You Sweat (Everybody Dance Now)"	C+C Music Factory	1990	Emilia	January 24, 2012	8
"Forget You"	Cee Lo Green	2010	Glitch	January 31, 2012	9
"Say Hey (I Love You)"	Michael Franti & Spearhead	2008	Bodie	February 14, 2012	11
"Milkshake"	Kelis	2003	Miss Aubrey	February 21, 2012	8
"Party Rock Anthem"	LMFAO	2011	Bodie	February 28, 2012	
"Yeah 3x"	Chris Brown	2010	Bodie	March 13, 2012	
"Escapade"^{a}	Janet Jackson	1990	Emilia	March 27, 2012	
"Nasty"	Janet Jackson	1986	Miss Aubrey	March 27, 2012	
"We No Speak Americano"	Yolanda Be Cool & DCUP	2010	Glitch	April 10, 2012	10
"Commander"	Kelly Rowland & David Guetta	2011	Angel	April 17, 2012	11
"Give Me Everything"	Pitbull ft. Ne-Yo	2011	Angel	April 24, 2012	8
"Spice Up Your Life"	Spice Girls	1997	Li'l T.	May 8, 2012	10
"Hello Good Morning"	Diddy & Dirty Money ft. T.I.	2010	Bodie	May 15, 2012	9
"Scenario"	A Tribe Called Quest	1992	Glitch	May 22, 2012	8
"Low"	Flo Rida & T-Pain	2007	Taye	May 29, 2012	9
"Replay"	Iyaz	2009	Angel	June 12, 2012	9
"Hot In Herre"	Nelly	2002	Mo	June 19, 2012	11
"Whine Up"	Kat DeLuna ft. Elephant Man	2007	Taye	June 26, 2012	8
"Round & Round"	Selena Gomez & the Scene	2010	Miss Aubrey	July 10, 2012	10
"La La Land"	Demi Lovato	2008	Li'l T.	July 17, 2012	10
"Never Say Never"	Justin Bieber ft. Jaden Smith	2010	Mo	July 24, 2012	11
"Down On Me"	Jeremih ft. 50 Cent	2010	Angel	August 7, 2012	11
"O.P.P."	Naughty by Nature	1991	Glitch	August 14, 2012	9
"Let It Rock"	Kevin Rudolf ft. Lil Wayne	2008	Bodie	August 21, 2012	11
"Promiscuous"	Nelly Furtado ft. Timbaland	2006	Angel	August 28, 2012	11

^aNo longer available for purchase.

== Development ==
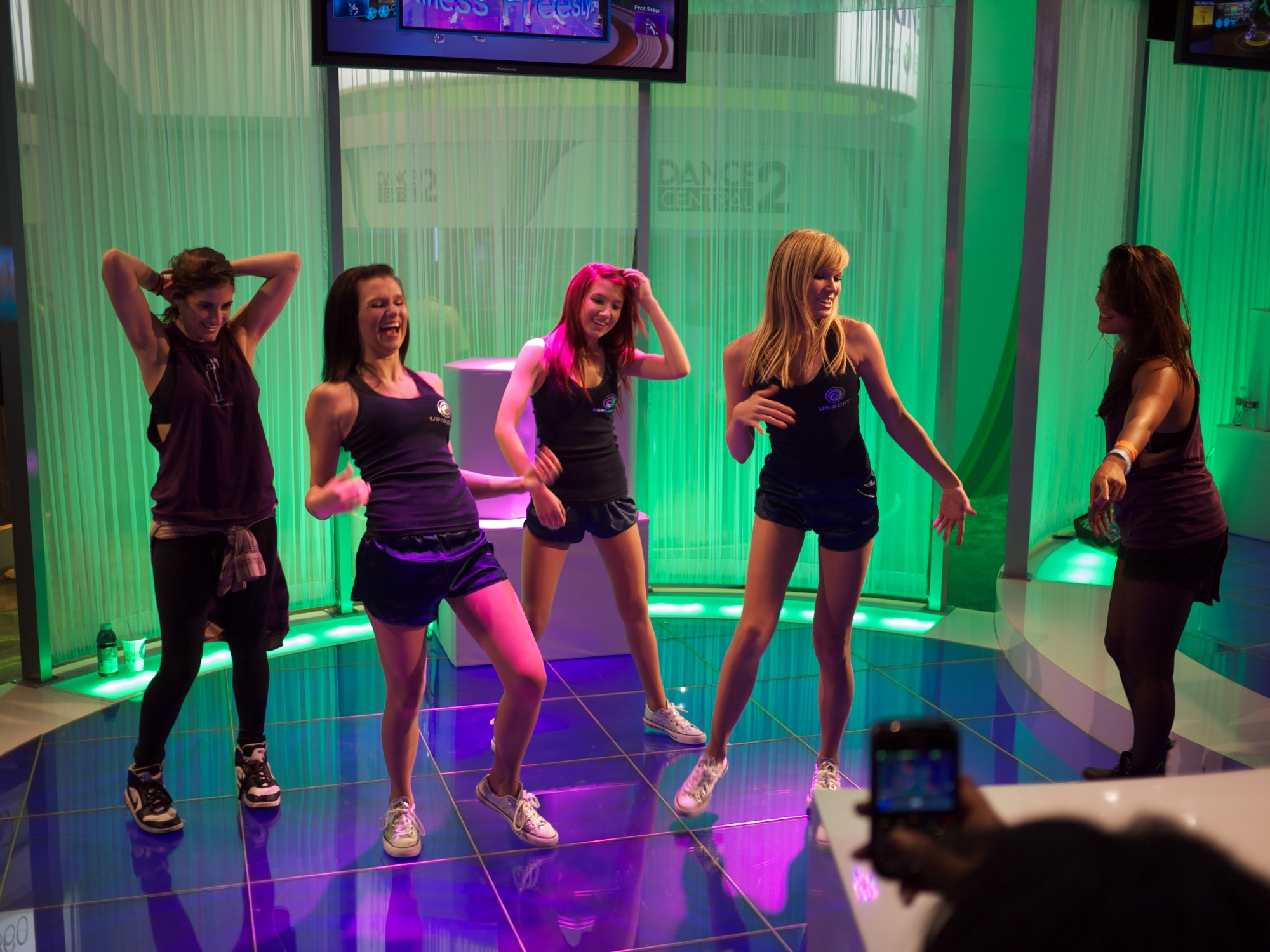
Promotion at the Electronic Entertainment Expo 2011

Shortly after the release of Dance Central, the pre-production of the game had been already started. Harmonix planned to observe the sales of Dance Central, which would help determine whether the development on the full version should start.

Dance Central 2 was officially announced at E3 2011 during Microsoft's press conference. It was announced on February 2, 2012 that if the community reached certain milestones, such as Star count or calories burned, three new crews and two new outfits would be released. Two crews were added to the game through this campaign. As of April 30, 2012, all content from this campaign has been released.

== Reception ==
Reception

Aggregate scores
Aggregator	Score
GameRankings	86.65%
Metacritic	86/100

Review scores
Publication	Score
1Up.com	A
Destructoid	9/10
Edge	8/10
Eurogamer	8/10
Game Informer	8.25/10
GamesRadar+	4.5/5
GamesTM	8/10
Giant Bomb	4/5
IGN	9/10
Official Xbox Magazine (US)	9.5/10
VideoGamer.com	8/10
X-Play	5/5

The game have received generally positive reviews. IGN praised the game's style, added multiplayer, and dances, but mentioned how a lot of the dances feel quite feminine, and how there is no shuffle mode.

During the 15th Annual Interactive Achievement Awards, the Academy of Interactive Arts & Sciences nominated Dance Central 2 for "Family Game of the Year".

As of August 2016, the game has sold 2.04 million copies worldwide.
