= Breathe (Fabolous song) =

2004 single by Fabolous

Single by Fabolous

from the album Real Talk
- B-side: "It's Gangsta"
- Released: August 30, 2004
- Studio: Right Track (New York City)
- Length: 4:28 (album version); 3:32 (radio edit)
- Label: Atlantic; Desert Storm
- Songwriters: John Jackson; Justin Smith; Roger Hodgson; Richard Davies
- Producer: Just Blaze

Fabolous singles chronology
"Badaboom" (2004)	"Breathe" (2004)	"Baby" (2005)

Audio
- "Breathe" on YouTube

"Breathe" is a song by American rapper Fabolous, released as the lead single from third studio album, Real Talk (2004). The song reached number 10 on the US Billboard Hot 100 chart in November 2004 and became a top-40 hit in several countries worldwide.

== Background ==
The song utilizes a sample of Supertramp's "Crime of the Century", with the latter taking 100 percent of the track's publishing. The single acquired two remixes; one featuring 50 Cent and Mase; another with Noztra and a remix by Cuban Link. The music video features cameos by The Game, Just Blaze, J. D. Williams, and DJ Clue.

== Legacy ==
Pitchfork Media named "Breathe" the number nine song of the year for 2004, stating "'Breathe' sounds like the track Fab was always meant to rap over." The song was also listed by Pitchfork Media as the 288th-best song of the 2000s. Complex named it number 60 on best songs of the decade. In 2006, the Beastie Boys performed their song "So What'cha Want" over the beat of "Breathe" on Late Show with David Letterman.

== Track listings ==
US 12-inch single

A1. "Breathe" (amended album version) – 5:20
A2. "Breathe" (instrumental) – 5:19
B1. "Breathe" (explicit album version) – 5:20
B2. "Breathe" (acappella) – 4:48

Australian CD single

1. "Breathe" (radio edit)
2. "It's Gangsta" (explicit version)
3. "Breathe" (explicit version)

UK and European CD single

1. "Breathe" (radio edit)
2. "It's Gangsta" (explicit version)

UK 12-inch single

A1. "Breathe" (explicit version)
A2. "Breathe" (amended version)
B1. "Breathe" (instrumental version)
B2. "It's Gangsta" (explicit version)

== Charts ==
=== Weekly charts ===
Chart (2004–2005)	Peak position
Australia (ARIA)	36
Belgium (Ultratip Bubbling Under Wallonia)	18
Canada CHR/Pop Top 30 (Radio & Records)	30
Germany (GfK)	65
Netherlands (Dutch Top 40)	37
Netherlands (Single Top 100)	34
New Zealand (Recorded Music NZ)	21
Scottish Singles Sales (Official Charts)	36
Sweden (Sverigetopplistan)	32
Switzerland (Schweizer Hitparade)	46
UK Singles (Official Charts)	28
UK Hip Hop/R&B (Official Charts)	9
US Billboard Hot 100	10
US Hot R&B/Hip-Hop Songs (Billboard)	4
US Hot Rap Songs (Billboard)	2
US Rhythmic Airplay (Billboard)	12

=== Year-end charts ===
Chart (2004)	Position
US Hot R&B/Hip-Hop Singles & Tracks (Billboard)	72
US Rhythmic Top 40 (Billboard)	76

Chart (2005)	Position
US Hot R&B/Hip-Hop Songs (Billboard)	86
US Rhythmic Top 40 (Billboard)	100

== Certifications ==
Region	Certification	Certified units/sales
United States (RIAA)	Platinum	1,000,000^{‡}
^{‡} Sales+streaming figures based on certification alone.

== Release history ==
Region	Date	Format(s)	Label(s)	Ref.
United States	August 30, 2004	Rhythmic contemporary; urban contemporary radio	Atlantic; Desert Storm	
Australia	November 22, 2004	CD	Atlantic; Desert Storm	
