= Baby (Fabolous song) =

Single by Fabolous featuring Mike Shorey

from the album Real Talk
- Released: December 13, 2004
- Studio: Right Track (New York City)
- Genre: Hip hop, R&B
- Length: 4:55 (album version); 3:50 (radio edit)
- Label: Atlantic
- Lyricists: John Jackson; Shaffer Smith; Derryck Thornton
- Producers: The Flame Throwers; The Chairman of The Boards; J Remy; Jeremy Skaller

Fabolous singles chronology
"Breathe" (2004)	"Baby" (2004)	"Dale Don Dale (Remix)" (2005)

"Baby" is a song by American rapper Fabolous featuring singer Mike Shorey, released by Atlantic Records on December 13, 2004, as the second single from Fabolous' third studio album, Real Talk. The song was written by Fabolous, Derryck Thornton, and American singer Ne-Yo, while production was handled by The Flame Throwers, The Chairman of the Boards, J Remy, and Jeremy Skaller.

"Baby" peaked at number 71 on the Billboard Hot 100, number 17 on the Hot Rap Tracks chart, and number 22 on the Hot R&B/Hip-Hop Songs chart. It contains a "replay" of "I Can't Help It" by Michael Jackson, lyrics from "2 Bad" also by Jackson, "Breakadawn" by De La Soul, while the hook borrows the line "I see some ladies tonight that should be having my baby, baby" from "Big Poppa" by The Notorious B.I.G.

== Music video ==
Rapper Rev Run makes a cameo appearance at the end of the music video. This music video premiered on 106 & Park on December 17, 2004.

== Charts ==
Charts (2005)	Peak position
Australian Urban (ARIA)	30
Finland Singles Chart	20
U.S. Billboard Hot 100	71
U.S. Billboard Hot R&B/Hip-Hop Songs	22
U.S. Billboard Hot Rap Tracks	17
U.S. Billboard Rhythmic Top 40	37
UK Singles Chart	41

== Release history ==
Region	Date	Format(s)	Label(s)	Ref.
United States	December 13, 2004	Urban contemporary radio	Atlantic	
