= Where Do We Go =

Single by Jay Sean

from the album The Mistress
- Released: 23 November 2011
- Recorded: October 2011
- Genre: R&B, electropop
- Length: 3:37
- Label: Cash Money
- Songwriters: Kamaljeet Singh Jhooti, J-Remy, Bobby Bass
- Producers: Fatty Le Rock and Orange Factory Music

Jay Sean singles chronology
"Like This, Like That" (2011)	"Where Do We Go" (2011)	"I'm All Yours" (2012)

"Where Do We Go" is a song by British recording artist, Jay Sean, taken from the compilation album, Hit the Lights. The song was produced by OFM production team J-Remy and Bobby Bass.

== Background ==
Jay Sean asks "Where Do We Go" on the first release from his mixtape The Mistress featuring acoustic renditions of original songs and his spin on some beloved classics. He attempts to repair a broken relationship in the song, which is also accompanied by a video of him in the studio, cruising in his Bentley, and walking on the Miami streets.

== Critical reception ==
Jason Newman of the MTV Buzzworthy, said: "Where Do We Go," the singer's latest single, we get to hear Jay Sean's smoothed-out, soulful side. Anchored by finger snaps and an acoustic guitar, "Where Do We Go" finds the protagonist at a crossroads in his relationship. "Love is not a fairy tale," Jay Sean sings. "But it ain't supposed to be this hard. And now the visions of our love fade away." Bummer, man. If "Down" saw the singer telling his girl to "lose control" and just "let it go," "Where Do We Go" is the postscript—the time when the clubbing ends and threats of changing locks and packed suitcases are exchanged. The track's tone—poignant with shades of optimism—recalls classic Michael Jackson ballads like "Ben" and "I'll Be There," and showcases Jay Sean's more mature side.

== Music video ==
The music video was premiered on 6 June 2011 and was directed by Derick G.

Jay trades rap cameos and overflowing bottles of champagne for a stool and black-and-white camera filters. Sean looks emotional and full of angst, singing about a growing apart and making choices when a relationship changes. He serenades the camera, pleading, "Where do we go from here? My heart, my soul, won't let you go," as he tosses a notebook of lyrics across the room and stares hopelessly off into the distance. "Where Do We Go" may be his venture into ballads and an acoustic side.

== Credits and personnel ==
- K. Jhooti - writing, vocals
- Orange Factory Music - producing
- Fatty Le Rock - producing

Credits adapted are taken from Allmusic.

== Release history ==
Region	Date	Format	Label
United States	23 November 2011	Airplay	Cash Money Records
