= Real Talk (Fabolous album) =

Studio album by Fabolous
- Released: November 9, 2004
- Length: 75:07
- Labels: Desert Storm; Atlantic
- Producers: Black Ice; Dangerous; Flame Throwers; Gerard Harmon; Hotrunner; Just Blaze; DJ Khaled; The Neptunes; Reefa; J. R. Rotem; Scott Storch; Trackmasters; JV

Fabolous chronology
Street Dreams (2003)	Real Talk (2004)	From Nothin' to Somethin' (2007)

Singles from Real Talk
- 1. "Breathe" Released: August 30, 2004; 2. "Baby" Released: December 13, 2004

Real Talk is the third studio album by American rapper Fabolous. It was released on November 9, 2004, by Desert Storm Records and Atlantic Records. Production on the album was handled by DJ Khaled, The Neptunes, Trackmasters, J. R. Rotem, Just Blaze, Reefa, and Scott Storch, among others. Guest vocalists on Real Talk include Lil' Mo, Pharrell Williams, Mike Shorey, Charlie Murphy, Jasmin Lopez, Sean Paul, Thara, Nate Dogg and Young Jeezy.

The album was received lukewarm from a critical standpoint but was a commercial success. It debuted at number six on the US Billboard 200, selling 179,000 copies in its first week and has been certified gold by the Recording Industry Association of America (RIAA). Real Talk was supported two singles: "Breathe" which is produced by Just Blaze and "Baby" which is produced by Flame Throwers and contains guest vocals from Mike Shorey. Videos were created for the singles "Do the Damn Thing" featuring Young Jeezy, which received minor airplay on BET, and "Tit 4 Tat" featuring Pharrell, which includes a portion of the album track "Round and Round."

== Critical reception ==
Professional ratings
Review scores
Source	Rating
AllMusic	2.5/5 stars
Blender	3/5 stars
HipHopDX	3.5/5 stars
RapReviews	7.5/10
Rolling Stone	3.5/5 stars
The Situation	4/5 stars
The Source	3.5/5 stars
USA Today	3/4 stars

Steve Juon of RapReviews gave note of the album's lengthy runtime being a challenge for listeners but commended Fabolous for striking a balance between "materialism and spiritualism" throughout the track listing with help from his producers utilizing his "smooth monotone flow" in the right places, concluding that, "I'm not yet prepared to say Fabolous is 'da truth' or that his rhyme writing has put him into echelons anywhere near the all-time greats, but he's come a long way since his Ghetto Fabolous days. You may find Real Talk a refreshing change of pace too." K.B. Tindal of HipHopDX praised Fabolous for remaining consistent in delivering club bangers ("Tit 4 Tat"), romantic slow jams ("Baby") and street cuts ("Don't Stop Won't Stop"), saying "There are always the pure exotic street flow wit hard punch lines to the gut that Fab delivers as well as the smoothly shaped ballads that he always dishes out the chicks. On Real Talk, Fab delivers as usual."

Steve Jones of USA Today praised Fabolous' lyricism having more direct sharpness and maturity to elevate the record's "brash confidence" alongside the usual hip-hop tropes, concluding that, "In the past, his hits have tended to lean toward female fans. But with Real Talk, he balances matters." Kris Ex, writing for Blender, was critical of Fabolous' lack of distinct character but praised him for being an entertaining wordsmith with a breezy yet confident flow, concluding that "It's this tension that keeps Real Talk from being a collection of one-serving throwaways: Fabolous lands dazzling lyrical stunts while sounding like he's coasting along on cruise control." AllMusic's Andy Kellman gave praise to "Breathe" for showing "signs of being a hip-hop classic" but was critical of Fabolous stretching his rapping skills by unconvincingly taking on various styles and a "mixed bag of satisfactory-to-strong crossovers", concluding that, "[T]here's enough quality material to help fill out a Fabolous best-of, but the touch-all-bases formula inhibits the album's potential of being any better than Ghetto Fabolous or Street Dreams."

== Commercial performance ==
Real Talk debuted at number six on the US Billboard 200 with 179,000 copies sold in its first week. This became Fabolous' third US top-ten debut. On December 13, 2004, the album was certified gold by the Recording Industry Association of America (RIAA) for sales of over 500,000 copies. As of February 2007, the album sold over 550,000 copies in the United States, according to Nielsen Soundscan.

== Track listing ==
Real Talk track listing
No.	Title	Writer(s)	Producer(s)	Length
1.	"Exodus (Preformed by Black Ice)"	John Jackson	Black Ice	1:25
2.	"Don't Stop Won't Stop"	Jackson; Jovonn "JV" Alexander	JV	3:37
3.	"Real Talk (123)"	Jackson; Dwayne Muchinson; Terrance "Hotrunner" Lovelace	Hotrunner	4:26
4.	"Gangsta"	Jackson; Khaled Mohammed Khaled	DJ Khaled	3:42
5.	"Tit 4 Tat" (featuring Pharrell)	Jackson; Williams; Chad Hugo	The Neptunes	4:38
6.	"Baby" (featuring Mike Shorey)	Jackson; Derryck Thornton	Flame Throwers	4:55
7.	"Girls"	Jackson; Samuel Barnes; Jean-Claude Olivier	Trackmasters	3:41
8.	"Church" (featuring Charlie Murphy)	Jackson; Gerard Harmon; Keith Wilkins; Murphy	Harmon; Wilkins	4:55
9.	"Can You Hear Me" (featuring Jasmin Lopez)	Jackson; J. R. Rotem; Lopez	Rotem	4:57
10.	"Do the Damn Thang" (featuring Young Jeezy)	Jackson; Jay Jenkins; Sharif Slater	Reefa	4:23
11.	"Holla at Somebody Real" (featuring Lil' Mo)	Jackson; Cynthia Loving; Slater	Reefa	3:47
12.	"It's Alright" (featuring Sean Paul)	Jackson; Justin Smith; Sean Henriques	Just Blaze	3:45
13.	"Breathe"	Jackson; Smith	Just Blaze	4:28
14.	"Young & Sexy" (featuring Mike Shorey & Pharrell)	Jackson; Williams; Hugo	The Neptunes	4:18
15.	"Round and Round"	Jackson; Scott Storch	Storch	3:40
16.	"In My Hood"	Jackson; Hailey Campbell; Phillip Pitts; Teraike Crawford	Dangerous	5:19
17.	"Ghetto" (featuring Thara)	Jackson; Storch; Thara Prashad	Storch	4:16
18.	"Po Po" (featuring Nate Dogg & Paul Cain)	Jackson; Kenisha Pratt; Nathaniel Hale; Rotem; Cain	Rotem	4:39
Total length:				75:07

== Charts ==
=== Weekly charts ===
Weekly chart performance for Real Talk
Chart (2004)	Peak position
Australian Albums (ARIA Charts)	90
Canadian Albums (Nielsen SoundScan)	40
Canadian R&B Albums (Nielsen SoundScan)	9
Dutch Albums (Album Top 100)	66
French Albums (SNEP)	119
UK Albums (Official Charts)	66
UK R&B Albums (Official Charts)	5
US Billboard 200	6
US Top R&B/Hip-Hop Albums (Billboard)	2

=== Year-end charts ===
Year-end chart performance for Real Talk
Chart (2005)	Position
US Top R&B/Hip-Hop Albums (Billboard)	70

== Certifications ==
Sales and certifications for Real Talk
Region	Certification	Certified units/sales
United States (RIAA)	Gold	500,000^{^}
^{^} Shipments figures based on certification alone.
