= 2012 (It Ain't the End) =

2010 single by Jay Sean

Single by Jay Sean featuring Nicki Minaj

from the album Hit the Lights
- B-side: "Your Love – Remix (featuring Jay Sean)"
- Released: 3 August 2010
- Recorded: 2010
- Genre: Dance-pop; synthpop
- Length: 3:41; 3:19 (without Minaj)
- Label: Cash Money; Republic
- Songwriters: Kamaljeet Singh Jhooti; Onika Maraj; J-Remy; Bobby Bass; Jared Cotter; J. Perkins
- Producers: J-Remy; Bobbybass

Jay Sean singles chronology
"Each Tear" (2010)	"2012 (It Ain't the End)" (2010)	"Hit the Lights" (2011)

Nicki Minaj singles chronology
"Bottoms Up" (2010)	"2012 (It Ain't the End)" (2010)	"Letting Go (Dutty Love)" (2010)

"2012 (It Ain't the End)" is a song by British singer Jay Sean taken from the compilation album, Hit the Lights. It features rapper and labelmate Nicki Minaj and is the album's lead single. The song was produced by OFM production team J-Remy and Bobby Bass. It was released to US radio stations and made available for digital download on 3 August 2010. The title is a reference to the 2012 phenomenon.

The song originates its meaning from the popular post the world was going to end in 2012 due to the Mayan calendar ending in 2012.

According to his interview on MTV News, the song was inspired by the science fiction movie 2012 and theories about the world ending. In addition, he wanted to inspire fans to jam like the world is ending but also to remember that it's not. "Sometimes you need to remind people to let go of all the heaviness they're carrying through the day. Yes, you had a stressful day but it ain't the end there. That's why it's called '2012 (It Ain't the End)'", Sean explained.

== Critical reception ==
Bill Lamb from About.com rated the single 4 out of 5 stars, commenting on "The powerful vocal kickoff", "expansive world party atmosphere" and "Nicki Minaj on guest raps". Lamb also noted that the song was similar to that of "Down" and concluded that "2012 (It Ain't the End) feels like a wise move for Jay Sean capitalizing on the party success of his two prior hits "Down" and "Do You Remember" while moving into an even more expansive sound". Robert Copsey from Digital Spy rated the song 3 out of 5 stars, also noting its similarity to "the USA-slaying synthpop/R&B sound of his breakthrough".

== Chart performance ==
"2012 (It Ain't the End)" debuted at number 50 on the Billboard Hot 100 for the chart week of 13 August 2010, later peaking at number 31. It peaked at number 34 on the US Pop Songs chart and climbed for a few weeks from its debut at number 92 to its ultimate height at number 23 on the Canadian Hot 100 . The single also debuted at number 40 on the ARIA Charts for the chart week of 26 August 2010 and at number 9 on the UK Singles Chart, on the issue of 24 October 2010.

== Track listing ==
Digital Download
No.	Title	Length
1.	"2012 (It Ain't the End)" (featuring Nicki Minaj)	3:42

UK iTunes Remixes EP Digital Download
No.	Title	Length
1.	"2012 (It Ain't the End) [WestFunk & Steve Smart Radio Edit]" (featuring Nicki Minaj)	3:45
2.	"2012 (It Ain't the End) [WestFunk & Steve Smart Club Remix]" (featuring Nicki Minaj)	7:26
3.	"Your Love" (featuring Nicki Minaj)	3:33

== Music video ==
The music video for "2012 (It Ain't the End)" was shot in Los Angeles on 19 July 2010, with Nicki Minaj. The video is set to many flashing lights and a typical hip-hop club scene environment. But in post-production, Sean said the music video's director Erik White would be zooming out to show parties in three cities around the world. "There's all these wonderful ideas the director Erik White has been telling me [about]." 'They are gonna zoom out, and it's gonna zoom into Tokyo! And the world is gonna spin around!' And I'm like, 'Really? That's amazing!' So for me, I'm looking forward to seeing those effects." "The concept of the video is basically all about throwing the biggest party, celebrating life. It's basically going around the world, from London to Tokyo to New York, seeing people celebrating good times." The video should have premiered on 8 August 2010 on MTV, however, the same day Sean confirmed on Twitter that the premiere had been rescheduled. The video was leaked on 14 August 2010, but Jay Sean confirmed that the leaked version of the video wasn't the final version.

The video features cameo appearances from former Spice Girl Melanie Brown, Cash Money Records CEO Birdman, writer Jared Cotter, producers J-Remy and Bobby Bass, and Thara. On 24 August 2010, the final version of the video was released to VEVO. The prelude and the music video of his song "Break Your Back" can be heard and seen in the end of the music video, but the full version is yet to be released.

The video won Best Video in the 2011 UK Asian Music Awards.

== Charts ==
=== Weekly charts ===
Chart (2010)	Peak position
Australia (ARIA)	40
Belgium (Ultratip Bubbling Under Flanders)	22
Canada Hot 100 (Billboard)	23
Canada CHR/Top 40 (Billboard)	20
Canada Hot AC (Billboard)	32
Euro Digital Song Sales (Billboard)	14
Ireland (IRMA)	44
New Zealand (Recorded Music NZ)	9
Scottish Singles Sales (Official Charts)	8
UK Asian Chart (The Official Charts Company)	1
UK Singles (Official Charts)	9
US Billboard Hot 100	31
US Pop Airplay (Billboard)	20

=== Year-end charts ===
Chart (2010)	Position
UK Singles (Official Charts Company)	184

== Certifications ==
Region	Certification	Certified units/sales
New Zealand (RMNZ)	Gold	7,500^{*}
United Kingdom (BPI)	Silver	200,000^{‡}
United States (RIAA)	Gold	500,000^{^}
^{*} Sales figures based on certification alone.^{^} Shipments figures based on certification alone.^{‡} Sales+streaming figures based on certification alone.

== Release history ==
Country	Date	Format	Label
United States	3 August 2010	Mainstream radio	Cash Money Records, Universal Republic
United States	3 August 2010	Digital download	Cash Money Records, Universal Republic
Canada	3 August 2010	Digital download	Cash Money Records, Universal Republic
United Kingdom	24 October 2010	Digital download	Jayded, 2Point9 Records
