= Dance Central =

- Genre: Rhythm
- Developers: Harmonix; Backbone Entertainment (2012)
- Publishers: MTV Games (2010); Microsoft Studios (2011–2014); Oculus Studios (2019)
- Platforms: Xbox 360, Xbox One, Oculus Rift, Oculus Rift S, Oculus Quest
- First release: Dance Central; November 4, 2010
- Latest release: Dance Central; April 30, 2019

Dance Central is a series of rhythm games developed by Harmonix, creators of the Guitar Hero and Rock Band video game series.

== Series ==
=== Dance Central (2010) ===
Dance Central was released exclusively for the Xbox 360 and was a launch title for its Kinect peripheral. The game was officially announced at E3 2010 and later released in October of that year.

=== Dance Central 2 ===
A direct sequel to the previous game, Dance Central 2 was officially announced at E3 2011 during Microsoft's press conference and was released in October of that year.

=== Dance Central 3 ===
Dance Central 3 was co-developed by Harmonix and Backbone Entertainment. It was announced at E3 2012 during Microsoft's press conference. The game was released on October 16, 2012 in the Americas, and on October 19, 2012 in Europe, Asia, Australia, and Japan.

=== Dance Central Spotlight ===
Dance Central Spotlight was announced at E3 2014 for Xbox One, and was released on September 2, 2014. Unlike previous installments, it is distributed digitally via the Xbox Games Store; the initial purchase includes 10 songs, with additional songs available as downloadable content on a near-monthly basis. For Spotlight, Harmonix emphasized quicker production of DLC, with a goal of having new DLC songs released while they are still on the music charts.

=== Dance Central (2019) ===
Dance Central (originally titled Dance Central: Unplugged) was published by Oculus Studios. Announced at PAX East 2019 for the Oculus Rift, it was released on April 30, 2019, as a launch title for the Quest and Rift S. Unlike previous installments, it's a virtual reality title that allows head and hand movement, using the headset and Oculus Touch controllers. The tracklist contains 32 songs as well as avatar customization and online multiplayer lounges.
