= Jeff Panzer =

American record producer

Jeff Panzer is a music producer, music video producer and record label executive. He has produced over 3,000 music videos in his career and has worked with The Rolling Stones, John Mellencamp, Paul McCartney, Alabama, John Secada, Lil Wayne, Godsmack, Wilson Phillips, Smokey Robinson, Stevie Wonder, Erykah Badu, The Grateful Dead, Nelly, The Moody Blues, Billy Idol, 98 Degrees, Brian McKnight, 3 Doors Down and many others.

== Career ==
In the 1970s, Panzer was the music producer for 20/20. He helped launch CNN's Showbiz Today, where he was the West Coast Entertainment Head Of Production for the show. He then moved to EMI where he served as Vice President of video development. Later he became VH-1's first Head Of Production on the west coast. Most recently, he was the Senior Vice President of the video department for Universal Records, for over a decade in Los Angeles, CA.

Panzer was the Executive Producer and Director of "The Crying Game" by Boy George and was nominated for an MTV Award for Best Movie Video. In addition, he was the Executive Producer and Director for "500 Miles" by The Proclaimers, which was also nominated for a MTV Award for Best Movie Video.

The video documentary titled The William Lee Golden Story; The Golden Oak, was produced and directed by Jeff Panzer.

Panzer currently oversees all Cash Money Records (YMCMB) music videos for artists such as Lil Wayne, Drake, Nicki Minaj and Glasses Malone.
