= So High (Jay Sean song) =

Single by Jay Sean

from the album Neon
- Released: 17 October 2012
- Genre: Electro house, dance-pop
- Length: 3:40
- Label: Cash Money, Universal Republic
- Producer(s): Afrojack, Orange Factory Music

Jay Sean singles chronology
"I'm All Yours" (2012)	"So High" (2012)	"Where You Are" (2013)

"So High" is a hit song by British recording singer Jay Sean. The song serves as the second single from his fourth studio album, Neon. It was produced by Afrojack, who also features in the song but is uncredited.

== Background ==
In July 2012, during an interview with MTV, Jay Sean revealed about the collaboration with Afrojack. He said "Afrojack was working in the same studio that I was in when I was recording the album, and I happened to bump into him. We recognized each other, so we checked out. He played me a couple of his songs; I played him a couple of my songs. We were like, 'Yo, let's do something together.'"

He added that "The song 'So High' is just ridiculous. Afrojack is such an amazing producer." He also commented on Afrojack, saying that "Again, he lives in the clubs. He knows what works. So when it comes to actually producing, he knows what's gonna have an impact in the club."

Sean further added "So, the production on this is just incredible," "It sounds insane 'cause, again, the songwriting here was the same team who were behind 'Down,' 'Do You Remember' — myself and Jared Cotter. When we write songs, it just works. So that plus Afrojack's unbelievable production skills ... it sounds phenomenal."

== Promotion ==
On 8 October 2012, Jay tweeted via his Official Twitter account "Yo peeps! I'll be premiering my brand new single, "So High" on XFactor in Australia on 16 October!!! @Thexfactor_au #xfactorau #YMCMB".

== Release ==
The song was first released via iTunes in Australian, New Zealand & Japan Market on 17 October 2012 as an EP. The EP included 4 tracks plus 1 unreleased bonus track.

== Music video ==
The still from the Music Video showing Jay Sean sitting on a chair, Tied with ropes, in the middle of the pool.

The video for the song first premiered on the Jay Sean's Vevo account on 5 October 2012. The video's length is 3 minutes 58 seconds.

=== Synopsis ===
The video opens with Jay escaping from a rope that ties him to a chair. The scenes then show what happens to him earlier and who ties him up. Clad in a black suit, Jay is mesmerized by a sexy lady he meets at a party. After they get together, they make out on a chair afloat a pool, before the blonde beauty ties him up to the chair and leaves him alone.

== Track listing ==
- Australia, New Zealand & Japan iTunes EP Digital download
1. "So High" – 3:40
2. "Sex 101" (feat. Tyga) - 3:58
3. "Patience" - 3:43
4. "I'm All Yours" (feat. Pitbull) - 3:38
5. "I'm All Yours" (feat. Pitbull) [R3hab Full Vocal Remix] - 4:35
- USA Promo CD
1. "So High" (Ralphi Rosario Vocal) - 6:53
2. "So High" (Ralphi Rosario Dub) - 6:53
3. "So High" (Ralphi Rosario Radio) - 3:41
4. "So High" (Papercha$er Vocal) - 5:39
5. "So High" (Papercha$er Dub) - 6:08
6. "So High" (Papercha$er Radio) - 4:05

== Charts ==
=== Charts ===
Chart (2012–13)	Peak position
Australia (ARIA)	47
Germany (GfK)	100
US Hot Dance Club Songs (Billboard)	3
