= I'm All Yours =

Single by Jay Sean featuring Pitbull

from the album Neon (Japanese edition)
- Released: 22 May 2012
- Recorded: April 2010 – January 2012
- Genre: Dance-pop
- Length: 3:38 3:29 (solo version)
- Label: Cash Money; Universal Republic
- Songwriters: K. Jhooti; A. Pérez; Atozzio Towns; Hookman Marlin Bonds; Ryan Taylor
- Producer: Orange Factory Music

Jay Sean singles chronology
"Where Do We Go" (2011)	"I'm All Yours" (2012)	"So High" (2012)

Pitbull singles chronology
"Dance Again" (2012)	"I'm All Yours" (2012)	"There She Goes" (2012)

"I'm All Yours" is an R&B-hip-hop song by British artist Jay Sean. The song was released in North America as the first single from his second album there, Neon. In other markets, including the UK, the song serves as Jay Sean's lead single from his fourth studio album. The single features American rapper Pitbull and is produced by Orange Factory Music.

"I'm All Yours" had its radio premiere on 18 April 2012. The track was officially released to US radio on 22 May 2012 and digital retailers on 29 May 2012. It performed modestly on the charts, peaking at number 85 on the Billboard Hot 100 in the United States. Internationally, it saw greater success in countries like New Zealand, where it peaked at number 22, and Australia, where it reached number 13.

== Background ==
In February 2012, Jay Sean revealed at the Cash Money’s pre-Grammy party in Hollywood that a brand new single, I'm All Yours featuring Pitbull, is coming. He told Rap-Up, "It’s gonna be a smash and I’m saying it right now because the video is insane". He further added "We shot it in Miami—yachts, helicopters, speed boats, all of that good stuff".

Speaking in May 2012 to MTV News Jocelyn Vena, Jay explained the background to the track, "Well, you know, people who know my music, especially when I first came over to America, one of the first things that people noticed with my songs is I like to do feel-good songs. And when it comes to the singles, that's what I like to give them. And 'I'm All Yours' is really the epitome of all that". He further added, "So it's still got that element of romance, which is what I like to bring to music. So it's high-energy and romantic. And the Pitbull collaboration actually happened in Australia, where we were on tour together, and you know, we're all fans of each other. We got talking, like, 'Man, we should do something.' So we laid it out right there and then". Further he said "I think the thing is, you got someone like Pit and myself, we share similar fanbases, but also, as I said, it's that high-energy music that really blends well together," he said. "And I think sometimes certain voices and certain vibes and certain styles just work together on a record, so it was just nice the way it came out"

=== Leak ===
The song along with the artwork was leaked on 20 April, but it was soon taken down by IFPI. However, Jay uploaded the artwork on his Facebook account later that day.

== Composition ==
"I'm All Yours"
This 29-second sample shows Jay Sean's first verse from the song. The lyrics of the song were praised by many critics.

"I'm All Yours" is a dance-pop influenced track that lasts for three minutes and thirty eight seconds. It includes the elements of club beats. The song starts with Jay Sean singing "I'm all yours tonight, got a feeling that I can't deny, everything about you gets me high, girl I want this for the rest of my life, I'm all yours". When this ends, Pitbull starts his verses.

== Music video ==
The music video for "I'm All Yours" was shot with Pitbull in Miami in February 2012 as a high budget video. Jay Sean tweeted about the video shoot and gave a sneak peek photograph as well. The video features Colombian model Nawal Ayoub, five exotic cars (worth almost a half a million dollars each), a yacht party and cameo from American rapper and co-founder of Cash Money Records, Birdman. The video was directed by Gil Green, who had previously directed the video for Jay Sean's 2009 hit single, "Do You Remember".

The video was premiered on 21 May 2012, during BET's 106 & Park, and had its online premiere on Vevo two days later.

== Promotion ==
Jay Sean gave numerous Stage performances in Countries like US, Lebanon, Indonesia, Japan etc. for the promotion of the song and the album. He even appeared on The Tonight Show with Jay Leno telecasted on 24 July 2012 and performed the solo version of the track.

Later Jay Sean announced "I'm All Yours Tour" for Australia and New Zealand. The Tour included 6 shows in Australia and 1 show in New Zealand.

== Confirmed track listing ==
Digital download

1. "I'm All Yours" (featuring Pitbull) – 3:38

== Credits and personnel ==
- Lead vocals – Jay Sean, Pitbull
- Producers – OFM
- Lyrics – Jay Sean, Hookman Marlin Bonds, Atozzio Towns, Ryan Taylor, Armando Perez
- Label: Cash Money Records, Universal Republic

== Charts and certifications ==
=== Weekly charts ===
Chart (2012)	Peak position
Australia (ARIA)	13
Austria (Ö3 Austria Top 40)	57
Belgium (Ultratip Bubbling Under Flanders)	25
Belgium (Ultratop Flanders Dance)	37
Belgium (Ultratop Flanders Urban)	44
Belgium (Ultratip Bubbling Under Wallonia)	6
Belgium (Ultratop Wallonia Dance)	27
Canada Hot 100 (Billboard)	53
France (SNEP)	107
Germany (GfK)	40
New Zealand (Recorded Music NZ)	22
Romania (Romanian Top 100)	41
US Billboard Hot 100	85

=== Year-end charts ===
Chart (2012)	Peosition
Australia (ARIA)	88

=== Certifications ===
Region	Certification	Certified units/sales
Australia (ARIA)	2× Platinum	140,000^{^}
New Zealand (RMNZ)	Gold	7,500^{*}
^{*} Sales figures based on certification alone.^{^} Shipments figures based on certification alone.

== Release history ==
Region	Date	Format	Label
United States	18 April 2012	Radio Premiere	Cash Money Records, Universal Republic
United States	22 May 2012	Top 40/Mainstream and Rhythmic radio	Cash Money Records, Universal Republic
United States	29 May 2012	Digital Download	Cash Money Records, Universal Republic
Germany	6 July 2012	Digital Download	
