= Orange Factory Music =

American production team

- Also known as: OFM, JRemy & Bobby Bass
- Origin: Burlington, Vermont, U.S.
- Genres: Dance; R&B; pop
- Years active: 1999–present
- Members: JRemy (owner/founder); BobbyBass (owner/founder); Jonathan Perkins (writer); Kiana Ledé (artist); Shaylen (artist/writer)

Orange Factory Music (also known as OFM) is an American production team formed in 1999 by record producers and songwriters Jeremy "JRemy" Skaller and Robert "Bobby Bass" Larow. OFM also has one writer signed under its corporate umbrella; Jonathan 'Perky Rain' Perkins. Most noted for their discovery and development of Jay Sean, the duo met at the University of Vermont, before moving to New York to pursue their musical career. Skaller and Larow, professionally known as "J Remy" and "Bobby Bass" also continued to produce, write, and remix songs for Fabolous, Monrose, Eva Avila, Ricki-Lee and Jay Sean.

The duo first charted with the No. 1 Billboard Dance song "Don't Want Another Man" by Tina Ann. In the next few years OFM consistently charted on the Billboard charts with production, remixer, and writers credits with Britney Spears, Justin Timberlake, Beyoncé, Kelly Rowland, Seal, Usher, Blue Cantrell, Backstreet Boys, Birdman, Alanis Morissette, Janet Jackson, Annie Lennox, Dolce, Tina Ann, Fabolous, Bone Crusher, Shakira, and Jessica Simpson.

In September 2013, OFM writer/composer Jonathan Perkins expanded the company's operations to Nashville in a joint publishing venture with OFM Publishing and Reach Music Publishing. In 2015, Skaller signed singer/actor Kiana Ledé. Since then she has signed a recording deal with Republic Records and a publishing deal with SonyATV.

They have produced, remixed and or written for Jay Sean, Britney Spears, Justin Timberlake, Beyoncé, Seal, Usher, Birdman, Blue Cantrell, Backstreet Boys, Alanis Morissette, Annie Lennox, Fabolous, Janet Jackson, and Shakira. Most recently they produced the No. 1 Aria Chart hit, "Boom Boom", by Justice Crew.

== Career ==
=== Discography ===
Artist	Song	Album	Label	Release	Credit	Performance
Ashley Ring	TBD	TBD		Cash Money/Universal Republic	5 songs on upcoming album	Producer; Unreleased
Big Time Rush	"Nothing Even Matters"	B.T.R.	Columbia	Album cut	Producer	-
Big Time Rush	"Superstar"	Elevate	Columbia	Album cut	Producer	
Big Time Rush	"24/Seven"	24/Seven	Columbia	Album cut	Producer	
Big Time Rush	"Confetti Falling"	24/Seven	Columbia	Album cut	Producer	
Big Time Rush	"Crazy for U"	24/Seven	Columbia	Album cut	Producer	
Big Time Rush	"In the Future"	TBD	Columbia	Album cut	Producer	Unreleased
Birdman	"Written on Her"	Priceless	Cash Money/Universal Republic	Single	Producer	Billboard Rap No. 17
Charice Pempengco	"Breathe You Out"	Charice	Warner Bros.	Album cut	Producer	-
Cody Simpson	"Round of Applause"	4 U	Atlantic	Album cut	Producer	-
Cover Drive	"Headphones"	Bajan Style	Geffen UK	TBD	Producer	Writer
Eva Avila	"Got a Feelin'"	Somewhere Else	Sony BMG (Canada)	Album cut	Producer	-
Fabolous	"Baby" ft. Mike Shorey	Real Talk	Desert Storm/Def Jam	Single	Producer	Billboard Rap No. 17
Fabolous	"What Should I Do"	From Nothin' to Somethin'	Desert Storm/Def Jam	Album cut	Producer	-
Israel Cruz	"Killing Me"	The Legacy	Nufirm Records/Sony BMG (Australia)	-	Producer	-
Israel Cruz	"Party Up"	TBD	Nufirm Records/Sony BMG (Australia)	Single	Producer	(Gold)
Jay Sean	"Down"	All or Nothing	Cash Money/Universal Republic	Single	Producer	Billboard Hot 100 No. 1 (5× Platinum)
Jay Sean	"Do You Remember"	All or Nothing	Cash Money/Universal Republic	Single	Producer	Billboard No. 9 (2× Platinum)
Jay Sean	N/A	All or Nothing	Cash Money/Universal Republic	Full album	Executive producer	-
Jay Sean	"2012 (It Ain't the End)" ft. Nicki Minaj	So High (Japan Edition)	Cash Money/Universal Republic	Single	Producer	Platinum worldwide, cert. Gold in the US
Jay Sean	"Hit the Lights" ft. Lil Wayne	So High (Japan Edition)	Cash Money/Universal Republic	Single	Producer	Billboard No. 17
Jay Sean	"Like This Like That" ft. Birdman	So High (Japan Edition)	Cash Money/Universal Republic	Single	Producer	-
Jay Sean	"I'm All Yours" ft. Pitbull	So High (Japan Edition)	Cash Money/Universal Republic	Single	Producer	-
Jay Sean	N/A	Neon	Cash Money/Universal Republic	Full album	Executive producer	-
Jessica Mauboy	"What Happened to Us" ft. Jay Sean	Get 'Em Girls	Sony BMG (Australia)	Single	Producer	ARIA No. 14 (Platinum)
Jessica Mauboy	"Kick up Your Heels" ft. Pitbull	Beautiful	Sony BMG (Australia)	Album cut	Writer	
JLS	"That's My Girl"	Outta This World	Epic	Album cut	Producer	-
JLS	"So Many Words"	TBD	Epic	Album cut	Producer	Unreleased
JLS	"Don't Look Down"	TBD	Epic	Album cut	Producer	Unreleased
Kevin Rudolf	"I Made It"	To the Sky	Cash Money/Universal Republic	Single	Producer	Platinum
Monrose	"Push Up on Me"	Temptation	Starwatch/Warner Bros.	Album cut	Producer	Album 4× Platinum in Europe
Priyanka Chopra	"Don't Call It Love"	TBD	DesiHits/Interscope	TBD	Producer	Unreleased
Priyanka Chopra	"Universal Party Lover"	TBD	DesiHits/Interscope	TBD	Producer	Unreleased
Priyanka Chopra	"My Kinda Show"	TBD	DesiHits/Interscope	TBD	Producer	Unreleased
Priyanka Chopra	"Close to You"	TBD	DesiHits/Interscope	TBD	Producer	Unreleased
Priyanka Chopra	"Everybody"	TBD	DesiHits/Interscope	TBD	Producer	Unreleased
Ricki-Lee Coulter	"Being Human"	Ricki-Lee	Sony BMG (Australia)	Album cut	Producer	-
Ricki-Lee Coulter	"Vibe Is Right"	Ricki-Lee	Sony BMG (Australia)	Album cut	Producer	-
Tank	"If You Want It (Say Yes)"	TBD	Atlantic	Album cut	Producer	Unreleased
Tinashe	"Artificial People"	TBD	OFM	Single	Producer	Non-album single
Timomatic	"Moment to Love"	Timomatic	Sony Music Australia	Album cut	Producer	
Tynchy Stryder	"Famous"	Third Strike	Island/Universal	Album cut	Producer	-

=== Remixes ===
Artist	Song	Performance
Britney Spears	Womanizer	-
Chris Brown	Forever	-
Danity Kane	Damaged	-Billboard Dance No. 1
Usher	Moving Mountains	-
Justin Timberlake/Beyoncé	Until The End Of Time	Billboard Dance No. 20
Seal	Crazy	-
Lindsay Lohan	Rumors	-
Janet Jackson	Old School	-
Jessica Simpson	With You	-
Kylie Minogue	Slow	Billboard Dance No. 1
Britney Spears	Toxic	Billboard Dance No. 1
Esthero	O.G. Bitch	Billboard Dance No. 1
Alanis Morissette	8 Easy Steps	-
Blu Cantrell	Make Me Wanna Shout	-
Tina Ann	Don't Want Another Man	Billboard Dance No. 1
Tina Ann	In My Dreams	Billboard Dance No. 20
Tina Ann	Too Late	Billboard Dance No. 9
Kristine W	Save My Soul	Billboard Dance No. 1
Orange Factory	White Horse	Billboard Dance No. 10
Dolce	Fire	Billboard Dance No. 2

== Artists ==
=== Jay Sean ===
OFM discovered British artist Jay Sean and helped to develop his sound, stage show, and story leading to a multi-album, multimillion-dollar record deal with Cash Money Records/Universal Republic. OFM then produced his internationally successful album My Own Way (No. 1 R&B Album on the UK Charts).

OFM produced and co-wrote the five times worldwide Billboard No. 1 single "Down" (Featuring Lil Wayne) as well as the second single, "Do You Remember" (featuring Sean Paul and Lil Jon), peaking at No. 10 on the Hot 100 and rapidly selling over a million units, itself. These two platinum selling singles charted in the Billboard top 10 and the Billboard hot 100 at the same time, which had not been accomplished by a male artist since 2003. OFM is currently involved with touring, sponsorships, TV appearances, and clothing lines with Jay Sean, as well.

=== Kiana Ledé ===
Kiana Ledé is signed to Republic Records. Her first single is due in early 2017

=== Thara ===
Former Desert Storm artist Thara.

=== Israel ===
Australian R&B singer, songwriter and producer Israel.

== Other Orange Factory Music related ventures ==
=== Silverbridge Media ===
Silverbridge Media is a music licensing and supervisor company. They have worked with MTV/Viacom on such shows as Room Raiders, Cribs, and Sweet 16. They have scored three mini-movies for Fabolous. In 2010, their writer/producer Jonathan "PerkyRain" Perkins won an Emmy for his documentary scoring work in 2010.

=== Orange Factory Publishing initiatives ===
Orange Factory Music (under the name Orange Factory Repertoire) has a publishing JV with Primary Wave/BMG, for the producer/songwriter, Khaled Rohaim (a member of the production team Twice As Nice).
