= Tempted to Touch =

2004 single by Rupee

Single by Rupee

from the album 1 on 1
- Released: 9 August 2004
- Genre: Soca; reggaeton (remix)
- Length: 3:42
- Label: Atlantic; Boomtunes
- Songwriters: Rupert Antonio Clarke; Darron Sean Grant
- Producer: Darron Sean Grant

"Tempted to Touch" is a song by Barbadian soca musician Rupee. The song was first released in 2002 on the VP Records sublabel Waist Line Muzik, backed with the song's riddim, "The Grippa Riddim". It also appeared on the compilation album Soca Gold 2003 before getting a slightly different sound for its 2004 single release. Upon its release, the song reached number 44 on the UK Singles Chart, number 39 on the US Billboard Hot 100, and number five on the Romanian Top 100.

A reggaeton remix of the song features Daddy Yankee. The song was included on Billboard's "12 Best Dancehall & Reggaeton Choruses of the 21st Century" at number five.

== Charts ==
=== Weekly charts ===
Chart (2004–2005)	Peak position
Australia (ARIA)	74
Australian Urban (ARIA)	18
France (SNEP)	32
Germany (GfK)	53
Netherlands (Single Top 100)	73
Romania (Romanian Top 100)	5
Sweden (Sverigetopplistan)	32
UK Singles (Official Charts)	44
US Billboard Hot 100	39
US Dance Club Play (Billboard) Lenny B./Ford/DJ Volume/Eric S. mixes	42
US Dance Radio Airplay (Billboard)	4
US Dance Singles Sales (Billboard) Remixes	1
US Hot R&B/Hip-Hop Singles & Tracks (Billboard)	26
US Rhythmic Top 40 (Billboard)	27

=== Year-end charts ===
Chart (2005)	Position
Romania (Romanian Top 100)	11
US Dance Radio Airplay (Billboard)	39
US Dance Singles Sales (Billboard)	3

== Certifications ==
Region	Certification	Certified units/sales
United States (RIAA)	Gold	500,000^{‡}
^{‡} Sales+streaming figures based on certification alone.

== Release history ==
Region	Date	Format(s)	Label(s)	Ref.
United States	9 August 2004	Rhythmic contemporary; urban radio	Atlantic; Boomtunes	
United Kingdom	11 October 2004	12-inch vinyl; CD	Atlantic; Boomtunes	
Australia	14 February 2005	CD	Atlantic; Boomtunes	
