= Rupee (musician) =

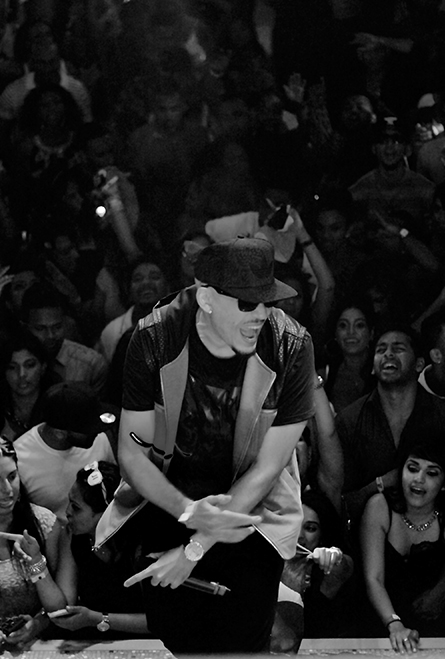
- I Love Soca 2014 - Mangos, South Beach

Background information
- Also known as: Rupee
- Born: Rupert Antonio Clarke; September 10, 1975 (age 50); Germany
- Origin: Barbados
- Genres: Soca
- Occupations: Musician, producer, songwriter
- Instrument: Vocals
- Years active: 1997–2000 (group); 2000–present (solo)
- Label: Independent

Rupert Antonio Clarke (born September 10, 1975), best known by his stage name Rupee, is a soca musician from Barbados. He was born in the military barracks in Germany to a German mother and a Bajan father, who was serving in the British Armed Forces at the time. He later migrated to Barbados. He was signed to Atlantic Records.

== Early life ==
By the age of nine, Rupee had lived in three different countries - Germany, England, and Barbados.

Spending his first years in England, he was exposed to a contrast of sounds which reflected his parents' diverse backgrounds: calypso on the side of his West Indian father, pop and rock and roll from his mother. He and his siblings would often perform on stage, coming up with all sorts of chants, rhymes and antics to tease the audience. Rupee eventually moved to Barbados in 1985. He had his first major break after winning the Richard Stoute Teen Talent Competition in 1993, when he was a schoolboy at Harrison College.

== Career ==
=== 1997–2000: Coalishun ===
Rupee emerged on the local soca scene after being invited to join the then popular Bajan band, Coalishun, along with singers like Terencia Coward and Adrian Clarke in 1997. Though initially more dancehall oriented, Rupee would find himself settling into the soca genre, a genre indigenous to the English speaking Caribbean, also known as the West Indies. This was marked by the release of his first hit single, "Ice Cream".

=== 2000–present: Solo ===
"Ice Cream" was followed by a string of hit songs from three self-released solo albums. "Jump", from his first album, won Rupee repeated Road March titles at carnivals in Barbados, New York City, Miami, Boston and Toronto. "Tempted to Touch", from his second album, enjoyed over two years of international club play, spreading to urban and pop radio in Toronto and Miami. It became the catalyst for Rupee’s worldwide deal with Atlantic Records, as well as the first single from his 1 on 1 album released in December 2004. The album itself introduced elements of flamenco and gospel into soca music.

Before deciding to pursue music full-time, Rupee explored other careers. After completing an associate degree in Graphic Arts from the Barbados Community College, he remained in that field for some time, working with two public relations/advertising agencies in Barbados.

== Discography ==
=== Albums ===
- 2001: Blame On It de Music
- 2002: Leave a Message
- 2003: Thisisrupee.com
- 2004: 1 on 1

=== Singles ===
- 2004: "Tempted to Touch"
- 2004: "What Happens in de Party"
- 2005: "Hands Up"
- 2006: "Massage"
- 2006: "Frenzy"
- 2007: "Slow Motion"
- 2008: "Magnet to Steel"
- 2008: "Living Lies"
- 2008: "Feet Don't Fail Me Now"
- 2009: "Standing Up Against the Law"
- 2009: "Single Ladies"
- 2010: "All Night Long"
- 2010: "Everybody"
- 2011: "I Am a Bajan"
- 2011: "How High"
- 2012: "Snake in the Grass"
- 2013: "My Day"
- 2013: "Nothing Sweeter"
- 2014: "Ah Playin Mas"
- 2015: "Footprints"
- 2015: "M.I.A (Missing in Action)"
- 2016: "Counting My Blessings"
- 2016: "I'll Be OK"
- 2016: "Tipsy"
- 2018: "Dip Down"
- 2018: "I've Got You Girl"
- 2018: "Perfect Fit"
- 2019: "Think Twice"
- 2019: "Most Wanted"

=== Collaborations ===
- 2003: "Enjoy Yourself" feat. Red Rat
- 2003: "If You Only Knew" feat. Destra Garcia
- 2004: "Tempted to Touch" feat. Daddy Yankee
- 2005: "Do the Damn Thing" feat. Lil' Kim
- 2006: "Hurricane" feat. Rihanna
- 2007: "Hey Mami" feat. Wisin & Yandel
- 2007: "Game of Love and Unity" feat. Shaggy & Fay-Ann Lyons
- 2008: "Push Up on Me" feat. Thara
- 2008: "No te veo" with Jowell & Randy feat. Pitbull, Nina Sky & Swizz Beatz
- 2013: "On Parade" feat. Nikita
- 2013: "Vamos a bailar" feat. Calero
- 2016: "No Name" Rupee x Ricardo Drue
- 2018: "Tempted to Touch" feat. Zaeden

== Achievements ==
Apart from dominating the charts in the Caribbean, Rupee has also gone gold in Japan and in most of Europe. Furthermore, "Do the Damn Thing", a bonus track from his album 1 On 1, recently featured in an episode of the American TV series, Desperate Housewives.

Over the years, Rupee has amassed a number of Party Monarch and Road March titles not only in Barbados, but also at West Indian Carnivals in the United States and Canada. His most popular hits have included "Ice Cream", "Jump" and the internationally released "Tempted to Touch" and "What Happens in de Party".

In 2007, Rupee along with Jamaican Shaggy and Trinidadian Fay-Ann Lyons recorded the official song for the 2007 Cricket World Cup - "The Game of Love and Unity" - written by Rupee.

He has worked with artists such as Rihanna, Shaggy, Thara Prashad, Fay-Ann Lyons, Alison Hinds, Lil' Kim, Daddy Yankee, Wisin & Yandel, Red Rat, Destra Garcia.

In 2011 during the Crop Over festival season, Rupee won the Starcom Network group of radio station's title of "People's Monarch" with his song "I Am a Bajan".

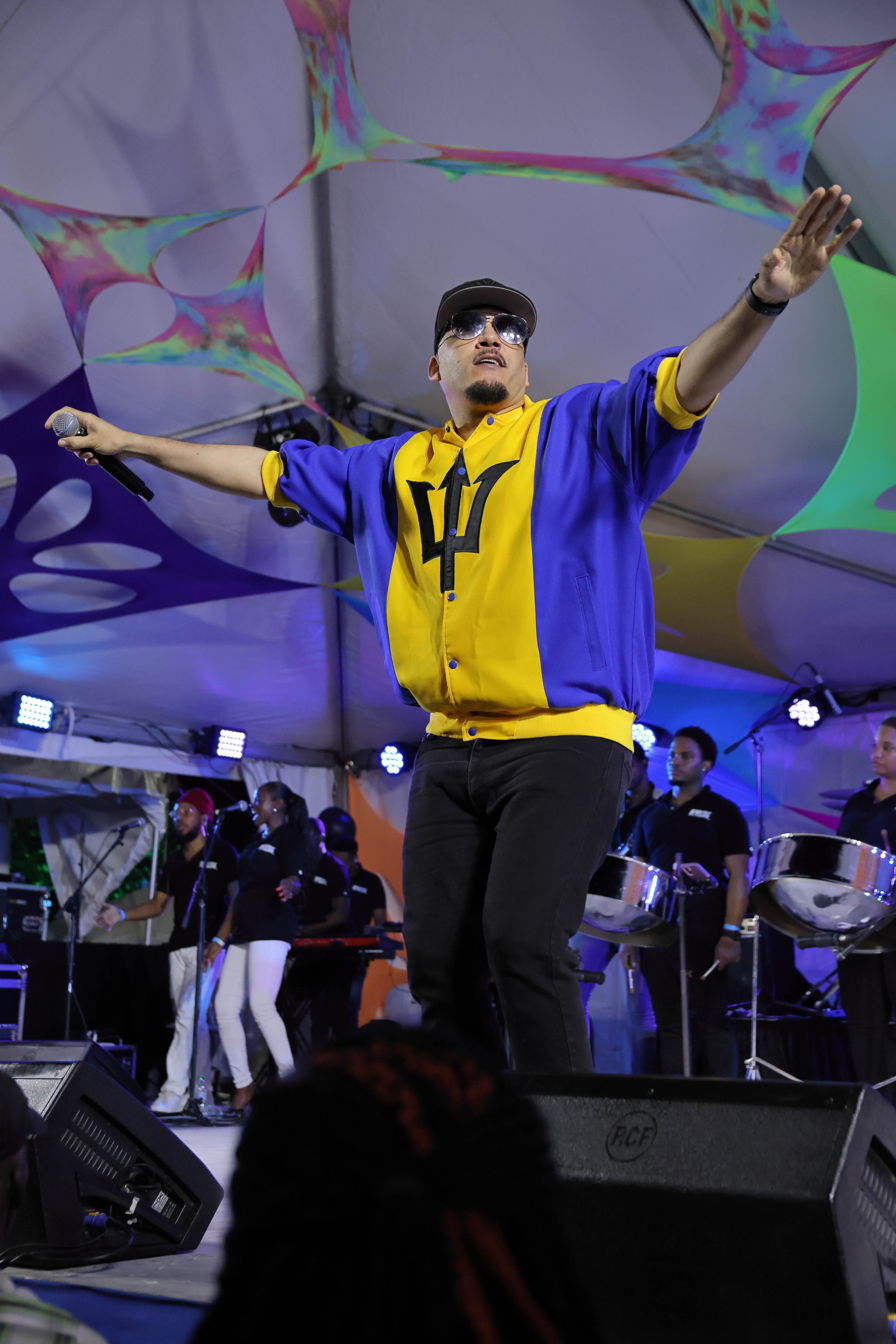
Rupee performing in Barbados
