= Hit the Lights (Jay Sean song) =

Single by Jay Sean featuring Lil Wayne
- Released: 4 February 2011
- Recorded: January 2011
- Genre: R&B; electropop
- Length: 3:41
- Label: Cash Money; Universal Republic
- Songwriters: K. Jhooti; Dwayne Carter; Jared Cotter; Jeremy Skaller; Robert Larow; Khaled Rohaim
- Producers: J-Remy & Bobbybass

Jay Sean singles chronology
"2012 (It Ain't the End)" (2010)	"Hit the Lights" (2011)	"Every Little Part of Me" (2011)

Lil Wayne singles chronology
"Look at Me Now" (2011)	"Hit the Lights" (2011)	"Bow Chicka Wow Wow" (2011)

"Hit the Lights" is the second single by English recording artist Jay Sean, featuring American rapper and labelmate Lil Wayne and produced by OFM production team J-Remy and Bobby Bass. It was released to UK as a digital download to iTunes on 4 February 2011, and to US radio stations and as a digital download to iTunes on 8 February 2011. It was released as a CD single in the United Kingdom on 24 April 2011.

== Background ==
Jay Sean told MTV, "I'm so excited about this song, 'cause, for me, it's the first time I felt like I did a huge club record, I always wanted to write a song that could be batted across all the clubs and on radio. And I think this is that song. It doesn't need any remixes or anything like that." He said also "I'm feeling mad excited about "Hit the Lights". It's a club banger that's gonna get everyone movin! I'm looking forward to watching another one of my songs grow! That's the most fun part!”

Of the collaboration he told MTV News, "It's inspirational, I learn off of people who have achieved greatness. There's something about them -- their work ethic, their mentality -- that resonates and strikes a chord. So when I watch him to see what he does, in my head I'm looking at it going, 'This is why he got to where he is.' And I like to learn that." Lil Wayne previously contributed a verse to the British artist's US breakthrough single, "Down". Jay Sean told DesiHits about the difference in dynamic between "Down" and "Hit the Lights" in terms of working with Lil Wayne, "It's different when you hear his interpretation of the song, he has understood that I have taken it to a bit more of a sexy and mature level on this song. "Down" was young and playful while "Hit the Lights" is for a mature audience and it is aimed at the clubs, plus the lyrics of the song. Lil Wayne added his interpretation and of course some things had to get bleeped out."

"I’ve never really had a massive club song, so I wanted a song that I could smash into clubs worldwide. That’s what the lyrics are about: having a good time. Musically it’s progressive for me. It incorporates more of the current music climate. I think you have to move with the times. Michael Jackson and Madonna moved with the times. Music is changing. I wanted to incorporate all the sounds – so we’ve got dance, we’ve got pop, we’ve got R&B, hip-hop all in one song. " Sean told India-West.

Jay Sean sampled the song in another song he made, YMCMB Heroes, featuring Tyga, Busta Rhymes, and Cory Gunz.

"Hit the Lights" was recently featured on Las Vegas, Nevada's tourism campaign "Only Vegas" where a man at his work station was singing along to the song while viewing photos of his vacation in Las Vegas.

== Music video ==
Bille Woodruff directed the music video for "Hit the Lights", which premiered on 22 March 2011 on VEVO. The video has many CGI effects and features women dancing, an appearance from Lil Wayne as well as Birdman and DJ Khaled and plenty of lights.

== Charts ==
Chart performance for "Hit the Lights"
Chart (2011)	Peak position
Australia (ARIA)	18
Belgium (Ultratip Bubbling Under Flanders)	19
Canada Hot 100 (Billboard)	68
Germany (GfK)	62
German Youth Airplay Chart	25
New Zealand (Recorded Music NZ)	24
Slovakia Airplay (ČNS IFPI)	18
UK Singles (Official Charts)	67
UK Hip Hop/R&B (Official Charts)	22
US Billboard Hot 100	18
US Mainstream Top 40 (Billboard)	34

== Release history ==
Release history and formats for "Hit the Lights"
Region	Date	Format	Label
United Kingdom	4 February 2011	Digital download	Cash Money Records, Universal Republic
United States	8 February 2011	Airplay	Cash Money Records, Universal Republic
United States	8 February 2011	Digital download	Cash Money Records, Universal Republic
Canada	8 February 2011	Digital download	Cash Money Records, Universal Republic
