= Thara Prashad =

American singer-songwriter

- Born: Thara Natalie Prashad; January 16, 1982 (age 44); New Jersey, United States
- Genres: R&B; pop; hip-hop
- Instruments: Vocals; piano
- Years active: 2006–present
- Label: Desert Storm

Thara Natalie Prashad (born January 16, 1982), also known as Thara, is an American R&B singer and model. Her father is Indo-Guyanese while her mother is part Irish and part African-American. Formerly signed to the Desert Storm label most known for rapper Fabolous.

== Early life ==
Born and raised in New Jersey, Thara started singing at 16 and began taking modeling jobs in the hopes of getting closer to the music industry. She landed a Reebok commercial campaign followed by a Verizon campaign. Shortly after the Verizon commercial, she met Jeremy Skaller, then an up-and-coming producer, who would eventually become a close friend and business partner.

== Career ==
Thara would go on to appear in more music and commercials videos, including Jay Z’s “Excuse Me Miss” in 2003. From there, she did a commercial for MTV 2 and met La La Vasquez, who was then a VJ for the network. La La introduced Thara to DJ Clue, to whom she gave her demo CD and after listening to it, he had Thara meet with the rest of his team, and then signed her to his label, Desert Storm. While working on her debut album, with Jeremy Skaller as the producer, Thara worked with Fabolous, John Legend, Kanye West, Rodney Jerkins, and The Neptunes among others. In 2007, she released her self-titled debut album Thara, which featured the hits “Jump On” with Fatman Scoop, and a duet she co-wrote with John Legend called “Maybe".

Following the release of the album, Thara toured throughout Australia, the UK, and Germany, enjoying international success. When she returned to the States, Jeremy Skaller booked her for a show in Miami as the opening act for the British-Asian, R&B/pop sensation Jay Sean. The two instantly clicked and their magnetic chemistry as artists led them to collaborate on the single “Murder", and travel across the globe performing the song. "Murder" was also included on Jay Sean's second album My Own Way in 2008. She featured in the video for Sean's "Stay" on his second album. She collaborated with Sean again on the song "Love Goes" that leaked in January 2010.

She was featured with Desert Storm rapper Fabolous on the song "Ghetto", produced by Scott Storch. "Ghetto" and the album Real Talk went on to sell over a million copies since its release in 2006.

== Personal life ==
She married singer Jay Sean in August 2009. Thara gave birth to their daughter, Ayva Loveen Kaur Jhooti, on December 13, 2013. They had a boy named Aaryan on August 15, 2018.

== Discography ==
=== Studio albums ===
- Thara (2007)

=== Extended plays ===
- The H Is Silent (2008)

=== Other appearances ===
Title	Year	Album
"Ghetto" (Fabolous featuring Thara)	2004	Real Talk
"Murder" (Jay Sean featuring Thara)	2008	My Own Way
