= List of songs written by Jay Sean =

The following are songs written by Jay Sean.

== 2003 ==
- "Dance with You" - #12 at UK top chart

== 2004 ==
- "Stolen" - #4 at UK top chart
- "Eyes on You" - #6 at UK top chart

== 2008 ==
- "Ride It" - #11 at UK top chart
- "Maybe"
- "Tonight"

== 2009 ==
- "Down" - #1 at Billboard Hot 100

== 2010 ==
- "Do You Remember" - #10 at Billboard hot 100
- "I Made It" - #21 at Billboard hot 100
- "2012 (It Ain't the End)" - #31 at Billboard hot 100

== 2011 ==
- "Hit the Lights" - #18 at Billboard hot 100

== 2012 ==
- "I'm All Yours" - #85 at Billboard hot 100
