= UK Asian Music Awards =

Music Award held in the United Kingdom

- Logo
- Awarded for: South Asian music
- Country: United Kingdom
- Presented by: B4U Music
- First award: 2002; 24 years ago
- Final award: 2012; 14 years ago
- Website: www.theukama.com

The UK Asian Music Awards, also known by the abbreviation UK AMA, was an awards show that was held annually in the United Kingdom from 2002 to 2012. The awards show has been produced and broadcast by B4U Music since 2008. Awards winners were decided by public voting at a website, from a list of nominees presented by the event organizers, except for the special category awards "Outstanding Achievement" and "Commitment to Scene" which are decided by the organizers. Desimag called the event "The most prestigious Asian music awards ceremony in the UK".

== History ==
The UK Asian Music Awards were founded by Abs Shaid in 2002 as "The Asian DJ and Music Awards". They were held on 6 March 2002 at the Aquarium nightclub in London. The event was filmed by BBC2 and Zee TV, and was aired on BBC2s Network East.

Following the success of the 2002 event, the UK Asian Music Awards (UKAMA) was formed. In 2003, Abs Shaid teamed with Br-Asian Media, managed by managing director Moiz Vas, to produce the 2003 event. The event took place in London at Hammersmith Palais on the 22 October 2003. It was filmed and broadcast by ITV, who reported viewing figures of one million in the UK. B4U Music broadcast two exclusive versions during prime time slots in 80 countries over the Christmas period. Other sources give the viewing figures of 2 million in the UK and 500 million worldwide. A 2003 review by Tom Horan in The Telegraph said: "This was a hugely inspiring night for new British music... The freshest most innovative and exciting sounds this year have come from the Asian club world. Here, with the first ever AMAs, the scene celebrated its gate crashing of the pop mainstream... there was something in the event's familial warmth and celebration that spoke of a thousand wedding receptions". Award winners were decided via online, SMS and interactive television voting. The voting process was criticized, claiming that the event turned out to be a popularity contest.

After the show, both parties claimed rights to continuing the show. This resulted in both parties issuing their own announcements for the next event, with Shaid's group keeping the name "UK Asian Music Awards" and Br-Asian's group calling it the British Asian Music Awards (BrAMA). ITV chose to side with BrAMA. and on 7 October 2004 Br-Asian made a launch party, planning for the 23 February 2005 at Ocean in London, which was later changed to 24 March 2005.

The 2005 UKAMA was held on 3 March 2005 at Hammersmith Palais, London, in front of a packed audience. To avoid some of the voting controversy, most awards were decided by a judges panel, out of a short list which was created by public voting. The winners of the Best Asian Radio, Best Asian Publication and Best Asian Website were determined by online and SMS voting.

The 2005 BrAMA were supposed to be held on 24 March 2005 at Cirque, in London. The event was supposed to be broadcast on Channel 4 on 27 March 2005 and shown on B4U Music a week later. However, to avoid confusion with the UKAMA, the event was postponed on 11 March 2005, and tickets were reimbursed. The event never took place, and finally, Br-Asian bowed out.

The 2006 event was held on 6 December 2006 at Hammersmith Palais, London, and was sponsored by Ary Digital. Two new categories were introduced, "Best Female Act" and "Best Unsigned Talent". Nominations were announced in November 2006.

2008 marked the big year for the UK Asian Music Awards, as they moved from the Hammersmith Palais to the Royal Festival Hall and were first presented by B4U Music. Royal Festival Hall for three years (2008 / 2009 / 2010) and moved to the Roundhouse, Camden in March 2011. It has previously been broadcast on ITV, B4U Music and most recently on the BBC red button (2010 and 2011). The UK AMAs celebrated its 10th anniversary on 25 October at Wimbley Arena, with a show headlined by international music star Ustad Rahat Fateh Ali Khan and was attended by music producer naughty boy.

== Award winners ==
=== 2003 ===
The 2003 event was held on the 22 October 2003 at Hammersmith Palais, London. Award winners were:

- Outstanding Achievement Award: Bally Sagoo
- Best Group: B21
- Best Club DJ Hip Hop/R&B: Smooth-D
- Best Club DJ Bhangra: RDB
- Best Club DJ House/Garage: Deejay 'S'
- Best Album: Gubi Sandhu - Dil Karda
- Best Single R&B: Rishi Rich Project ft. Jay Sean & Juggy D - "Dance With You"
- Best Single Bhangra: Punjabi MC - "Mundian To Bach Ke"
- Best Asian Underground Act: Shaanti
- Best Producer: Rishi Rich
- Best MC: Metz & Trix
- Best International Success: Apache Indian
- Best Asian Magazine: Snoop
- Best Asian Website: was-up.com & wwwsoasians.com
- Best Asian Radio Station: BBC Asian Network
- Commitment to the Scene: Markie Mark
- Best Newcomer: Indy Sagu
- Best Radio DJ: Panjabi Hit Squad

=== 2005 ===
The 2005 event was held on 3 March 2005 at Hammersmith Palais, London. The award winners were:

- Best Single: 2Play ft. Raghav - "So Confused"
- Best Album: Jay Sean - Me Against Myself
- Best Group: DCS
- Best Underground: Asian Dub Foundation
- Best International Artist: Taz - Stereo Nation
- Best Club DJ: Hanif
- Best Urban Act: Jay Sean
- Best MC: E=MC
- Best Newcomer: Raghav
- Best Producer: Swami
- Best Asian Radio: BBC Asian Network
- Best Radio DJ: Panjabi Hit Squad
- Best Asian Publication: Asiana Magazine
- Best Asian Website: was-up.com & wwwsoasians.com
- Best Video: Jay Sean - "Stolen"
- Outstanding Achievement: Apache Indian
- Commitment to Scene: Malkit Singh
- Legends: Nusrat Fateh Ali Khan

=== 2006 ===
The 2006 event was held on 6 December 2006 at Hammersmith Palais, London. The award winners were:

- Best Female Act: Veronica
- Best Act: Juggy D
- Best Producer: Aman Hayer
- Best International Act: Gurdas Maan
- Best Unsigned Talent: 3 Mix
- Best Single: Kray Twinz
- Best Newcomer: Sef
- Best Urban Act: Sef
- Best Album: Sukshinder Shinda
- Best Video: Sukshinder Shinda
- Best Asian Underground: Niraj Chag
- Commitment to Scene: Farook - Joi
- Best Radio Station: Club Asia

=== 2008 ===
The 2008 event was the first to be presented by B4U Music. Nominees were announced in January 2008, and the event was held on 6 March 2008 at the Royal Festival Hall, London. The award winners were:

- Best Act: Sukshinder Shinda
- Best Album: Sukshinder Shinda - Living the Dream
- Best Club DJ: Jags Klimax
- Best Female Act: Hardkaur
- Best Newcomer: H-Dhami
- Best Producer: Swami
- Best Radio Show: Adil Ray - BBC Asian Network
- Best Urban Act: Jay Sean
- Best International Act: Adnan Sami
- Best Asian Underground Act: Shaanti
- Best Video: Jay Sean - "Ride It"
- Best Website: Desi Hits
- Commitment to Scene: Nitin Sawhney
- Outstanding Achievement: Shin - DCS
- Lifetime Achievement: Heera

=== 2009 ===
Nominees for the 2009 event were announced in January 2009. The 2009 event was held on 5 March 2009 at the Royal Festival Hall, London. The award winners were:

- Best Producer: Rishi Rich - Sadke Java
- Best Club DJ: DJ Vix
- Best Female Act: M.I.A.
- Best Male Act: Jay Sean
- Best Act: H Dhami
- Best International Act: Miss Pooja
- Best International Album: Gurdas Mann - Boot Polishan
- Best Alternative Act: Nitin Sawhney
- Best Newcomer: Jaz Dhami
- Best Video: Jazzy B - "Rambo"
- Best Album: Jay Sean - My Own Way
- Best Urban Act: Jay Sean
- Best Radio Show: Bobby Friction - BBC Asian Network
- Commitment to the Scene: Rishi Rich
- Outstanding Achievement: A.R. Rahman

=== 2010 ===
Nominees for the 2010 event were announced on 2 February 2010 at the Gatecrasher Nightclub, Birmingham. The event was held on March 11 at the Royal Festival Hall, London, and was sponsored by Lebara Mobile. The award winners were:

- Best Album: Jay Sean - All Or Nothing
- Best Female Act: Amar
- Best Male Act: Jay Sean
- Best Alternative Act: Natasha Khan (Bat For Lashes)
- Best Club DJ: DJ H
- Best Newcomer: JK
- Best Producer: Sukshinder Shinda
- Best International Act: Rahat Fateh Ali Khan
- Best Urban Act: Jay Sean
- Best Radio Show: Nihal - Radio 1
- Best Video: Jay Sean - "Down"
- Best International Album: Miss Pooja - Romantic Jatt
- Outstanding Achievement: Biddu
- Commitment to Scene: Talvin Singh

=== 2011 ===
The press & media launch party for the 2011 event was held on 25 November 2010 at Club Alto, London. The nomination party took place on 1 February 2011 at the Gatecrasher Nightclub, Birmingham. The event was held on 10 March 2011 at The Roundhouse, London and was sponsored by Lebara Mobile. The award winners were:

- Best Album: Punjabi By Nature – Crowd Pleaser
- Best Female Act: Preeya Kalidas
- Best Male Act: Jay Sean
- Best Alternative Act: Rumer
- Best Club DJ: DJ Kayper
- Best Newcomer: Jernade Miah
- Best Music Producer: Sukshinder Shinda - Jadoo
- Best International Act: Miss Pooja
- Best International Album: DJ Sanj – American Desi
- Bestselling British Single: Punjabi By Nature ft. The Dhol Foundation - "Kaun Nee Jaandah"
- Best Desi Act: Jaz Dhami
- Best Urban Act: Mumzy Stranger
- Best Radio Show: Bobby Friction – BBC Asian Network
- Best Video: Jay Sean ft. Nicki Minaj – "2012 (It Ain't the End)"
- Commitment to Scene: Cornershop
- Lifetime Achievement Award: Apache Indian

=== 2012 ===
The events of the 10th anniversary edition of the award, in 2012, were launched on 6 December 2011 in a voting launch party at the Merah club in London. The event was hosted by Sarah-Jane Crawford and Tommy Sandhu and included performance by Mumzy Stranger, among other. The 2012 event took place at Wembley Arena and was headlined by a special performance by Rahat Fateh Ali Khan. Award winners were:

- Best Club DJ: Panjabi Hit Squad
- Unsigned Newcomer: Amanjot Sangha
- Best Alternative Act: Raghu Dixit
- Best Radio Show: Kiss 100 (DJ Neev)
- Best Selling Download: Rahat Fateh Ali Khan for Teri Meri
- Best International Album: Honey Singh for International Villager
- Best International Act: Rahat Fateh Ali Khan
- Best Producer: Dr Zeus
- Best Album: JK with Gabru Panjab Dha
- Best Desi Act: RDB
- Best Video: Bad Girls by M.I.A
- British Artist of the Decade: Jay Sean
- International Artist of the Decade: Rahat Fateh Ali Khan
- Best Urban Act: Arjun
- Best Newcomer: Shide Boss
- Best Female Act: Preeya Kalidas
- Commitment to the Scene: RDB
