= Make My Love Go =

Single by Jay Sean featuring Sean Paul
- Released: 5 February 2016
- Genre: Dancehall; tropical house
- Length: 3:31
- Label: Sony
- Songwriters: Kamaljit Jhooti; Sean Paul Henriques; Jeremy Skaller; Marty James; Louis Bell; Harry Hyams; Max Elliott; Winston Sela
- Producer: J-Remy OFM

Jay Sean singles chronology
"Freak" (2015)	"Make My Love Go" (2016)	"Thinking About You" (2016)

Sean Paul singles chronology
"Dangerous Love" (2014)	"Make My Love Go" (2016)	"Cheap Thrills" (2016)

"Make My Love Go" is a song by English singer Jay Sean, and the lead single from his upcoming studio album. It is Jay Sean's first single release in three years. The song features Jamaican rapper Sean Paul, who previously collaborated with Jay Sean on the 2009 single "Do You Remember". The song was produced by J-Remy and also features vocals from Kiana Ledé. The single was released on 5 February 2016, by Sony Music.

== Background ==
Sean collaborated with Sean Paul on his second single, "Do You Remember", from his third album overall (and his first studio album in the United States) All or Nothing. The single received positive reviews from critics, and reached number nine on the US Billboard Hot 100 on 9 January 2010, becoming Sean's second most successful single in the US, after his multi-platinum hit, "Down".

It contains a sample of lyrics from Maxi Priest's song "Close to You" (1990).

== Release ==
The single was released worldwide on 5 February 2016.

== Music video ==
The music video for the song featured Jay Sean, Sean Paul and Candice Craig, who has also featured Sean's "All I Want" music video. It was released on 12 February 2016.

== Chart performance ==
The song reached number 16 on the Dutch Top 40 chart and number 24 on the Single Top 100 chart.

The Song reached No.1 on the UK Asian Music Charts.

The song has reached number 49 on the UK Singles Chart.

== Track listing ==
- Digital download
1. "Make My Love Go" (featuring Sean Paul) – 3:31
- iTunes download
1. "Make My Love Go" (Remix) (featuring Sean Paul and Maluma) – 3:41

== Credits ==
- Jay Sean – lead vocals
- Sean Paul – lead vocals
- Kiana Ledé - background vocals (chorus)

== Charts and certifications ==
=== Weekly charts ===
Chart (2016)	Peak position
Austria (Ö3 Austria Top 40)	52
Belgium (Ultratip Bubbling Under Flanders)	16
Belgium (Ultratip Bubbling Under Wallonia)	33
Germany (GfK)	22
Ireland (IRMA)	65
Netherlands (Dutch Top 40)	14
Netherlands (Single Top 100)	22
Poland Airplay (ZPAV)	79
Slovakia Airplay (ČNS IFPI)	9
Sweden (Sverigetopplistan)	78
Switzerland (Schweizer Hitparade)	48
UK Singles (Official Charts)	49
UK Asian (Official Charts Company)	1
UK Hip Hop/R&B (Official Charts)	7

=== Year-end charts ===
Chart (2016)	Position
Netherlands (Dutch Top 40)	66
Netherlands (Single Top 100)	79

=== Certifications ===
Region	Certification	Certified units/sales
Germany (BVMI)	Gold	200,000^{‡}
Netherlands (NVPI)	Platinum	30,000^{‡}
Sweden (GLF)	Gold	20,000^{‡}
United Kingdom (BPI)	Silver	200,000^{‡}
^{‡} Sales+streaming figures based on certification alone.
