= Stay (Jay Sean song) =

Single by Jay Sean

from the album My Own Way and All or Nothing
- Released: 30 June 2008
- Recorded: 2007
- Genre: R&B; pop
- Length: 3:39
- Label: Jayded; 2Point9
- Songwriter(s): Jay Sean; Alan Sampson
- Producer(s): Alan Sampson

Jay Sean singles chronology
"Maybe" (2008)	"Stay" (2008)	"Tonight" (2009)

"Stay" is a song by Jay Sean, released as the third single from his second album My Own Way. It was also included on his third album, All or Nothing. The single was released on 30 June 2008 digitally and on 7 July 2008 physically in the UK. It became his lowest-charting official UK single to date, peaking at number 59.

== History ==
The video was shot alongside the "Maybe" video.

A remix has been made with Boy Better Know members: Skepta, Jammer and Frisco, along with Chip

A Hindi version of the song was also included in the Indian release of the album My Own Way. It is also known as "Tu Rahe".

== Music video ==
On 5 May 2008, the video was exclusively available to watch on YouTube. On 12 May 2008 the music video premiered on the music channel The Box. The music video for the song has an appearance from Thara, who worked with Jay on Murder and has done several shows with him.

The video for the Boy Better Know remix features the members Frisco, Skepta, Chipmunk and Jammer. The video also features MC Zani.

== Formats and track listings ==
#	Title	Time
Digital CD1: Island
1.	"Stay" [Album version]	3:39
2.	"Stay" [Boy Better Know Remix] (featuring Frisco, Skepta, Chipmunk & Jammer)	3:37
Maxi CD/Digital CD2: Island
1.	"Stay" [Album version]	3:39
2.	"Never Been in Love"	3:21
3.	"Stay" [Boy Better Know Remix]	3:41
4.	"Stay" [Soundbwoy Remix]	3:37
5.	"Stay" [Dj Shadow Dubai Official Desi Remix] (featuring Anushka Manchanda)	4:03

== Charts ==
Chart performance for "Stay"
Chart (2008)	Peak position
UK Singles (OCC)	59
