= All or Nothing (Jay Sean album) =

Studio album by Jay Sean
- Released: 23 November 2009
- Recorded: November 2008 – October 2009
- Genre: R&B
- Length: 51:45 (US edition)
- Labels: Jayded; 2Point9; Cash Money; Universal Republic
- Producers: J-Remy; Bobby Bass; Alan Sampson

Jay Sean chronology
My Own Way (2008)	All or Nothing (2009)	Neon (2013)

Singles from All or Nothing
- 1. "Down" Released: 30 June 2009; 2. "Do You Remember" Released: 3 November 2009

All or Nothing is the third studio album by British R&B singer Jay Sean, released in the United States on 23 November 2009 through Cash Money Records and Universal Republic as the singer's international debut album and a week later on 30 November 2009 with Jayded Records and 2Point9 Records. The album was also released in international markets from December 2009.

The album was preceded by the lead single, "Down" featuring label-mate Lil Wayne which was released in the US on 30 June 2009 and eventually peaked at number one on 17 October 2009. The song was also Sean's highest UK chart entry reaching number three. Following the album's release, "Do You Remember" was released as the second single and in January 2010 peaked at number ten in the US and subsequently making him the first male artist in seven years to have his first two charting singles appear in the Hot 100 simultaneously.

According to aggregated music reviews site Metacritic, the album received mixed reviews by critics who scored the album 59/100. Despite success with the two lead singles from the album, the album itself only debuted at No. 37 on the US Billboard 200 albums chart. It was also his lowest-charting entry on the UK Albums Chart, debuting there at No. 62. Despite this, it has become his highest-charting album in Japan, reaching No. 11 on the Oricon Albums Chart.

== Background and conception ==
Jay Sean has been active in the British Asian and Global South Asian markets since 2003, and put out his second studio album, My Own Way in 2008 throughout Europe and Asia independently via his own Jayded Records. Success with R&B/urban singles like "Ride It" and "Maybe" made him a frequent appearance on the UK R&B Chart. Eventually, that success caught the attention of Ronald "Slim" Williams, the CEO of Cash Money Records, who said

Ten million views and this kid is not in America? I want to help this kid, and he needs our engine, that is Cash Money Records to take him to the next level.

On 15 October 2008 at the MOBO Awards, Sean announced that he had signed with the American record label. He explained, "It's always been a dream for me to sign to an American label. And it's great to be accepted by the best in the game."

With regards to the album title, in February 2010, Sean was intervied by writer Pete Lewis of the award-winning Blues & Soul. Sean commented that, "I don't do things by halves, because there's no point! So I don't want mediocrity. I wanna be the best that I can be. I want it all. And that's what the title and theme of this album is all about!"

== Recording and production ==
After signing with Cash Money, Sean announced through an interview with MTV IGGY that he was recording five new songs for the album. Initial reports suggested that a remix was produced for his single "Tonight" with Lil Wayne, as the record label intended to use the song to introduce Sean to the American market. However, it proved to be an unfounded rumour and instead "Down" was announced as the lead single from the album.

The album was originally intended to be released during the Summer of 2009, then an October release date was confirmed however the final release date, 23 November 2009 was confirmed. Later announcement confirmed that a whole new set of songs was recorded, where some would feature other artists from the Cash Money Records roster.

He discussed a possible collaboration with Akon during the Grammy Awards in 2009, and recorded a song with Nadine Coyle of Girls Aloud and another with Keisha Buchanan of the Sugababes. On 28 October 2009, Sean posted a Twitter message referring to a collaboration with a legendary UK artist. Later he confirmed the artist to be Craig David who would feature on a previous album song.

He was also in the studio with Jive Records recording artist Livvi Franc and Jared Cotter writing new songs, and label mate, Kevin Rudolf. The song with Kevin Rudolf was later confirmed to be "I Made It (Cash Money Heroes)" and released as the first single from Rudolf's second album; and the theme song for the upcoming WWE pay-per-view WrestleMania XXVI. Prior to the release of the album, "Down" was confirmed to feature Lil Wayne with the rest of the track listing uncertain. Sean described "Down" as "a fun, very easy track something to pump in your car or be played in the clubs". Another song, "War" is about "battling with anybody, whether it's your girl, family or another country never solved anything, the song is about real life". Sean also confirmed the appearance of Drake on "If I Ain't Got You". Unfortunately, Drake was unable to commit and the second single-release was replaced by "Do You Remember".

== Release and promotion ==
Jay Sean released the deluxe edition of My Own Way exclusively in the UK and initially, the Deluxe Edition was set for release in the US, but Cash Money Records executives insisted on the release on a new album." The album contains a mix of new material and songs from Sean's previous studio album My Own Way, specifically the singles "Ride It" and "Stay" along with "Cry" and the album's title track, "All Or Nothing". A new remixed version of "Stuck in the Middle" with new vocals from both Sean and Jared Cotter is also featured, and for the UK edition, a new version with Craig David was produced.

He was invited to perform with Justin Timberlake at "The Justin Timberlake and Friends Concert Benefiting Shriners Hospitals For Children" on 17 October 2009 where he performed an acoustic version of "Down". Other artists performing there included Taylor Swift and Alicia Keys. It became one of the highest-earning charity events of the year, raising more than $9 million. On 11 December 2009, Sean became the first South Asian origin artist since Freddie Mercury to perform at Madison Square Garden, as part of the Jingle Ball concert, alongside fellow British beatboxer MC Zani. Sean's performance "had the entire crowd - parents and children, teens and twenty-somethings - dancing." Jay Sean returned to his roots on 14 February 2010 as he prepares to spend Valentine's Day at London's Wembley Arena, alongside American R&B star Ne-Yo.

=== Launch parties ===
Jay Sean had a launch party for the album at the Royal Exchange, London. Sean, along with his Cash Money Records family, was in London to celebrate the milestone. Pop artist Rihanna stepped into the building. Alesha Dixon, Alexandra Burke and Craig David was on the party too. One week after the party in London, Jay Sean had a launch party in Hollywood, Los Angeles, for the album, with dancehall artist Sean Paul and rapper Drake showing up to support Sean.

=== Tour ===
Jay Sean went on a small tour to promote the album.

=== Singles ===
"Down" was chosen as the lead single for the album. It was released on iTunes on 30 June 2009 and to U.S. radio on 27 July 2009. The song debuted at No. 72 on the Billboard Hot 100 before it started to climb the chart. After several weeks of remaining within the top five, "Down" reached number one, overtaking the long run of The Black Eyed Peas' record-setting single, "I Gotta Feeling". "Down" is the seventh-best selling song of 2009, having sold more than three million digital copies in the United States alone. It also received a large airplay of two billion listener impressions on radio worldwide. The song also charted inside the top 3 of the UK Singles Chart, becoming Sean's highest charting single to date there. "Down" is Sean's third top 10 and sixth top 20 hit in his home country.

The album's second single "Do You Remember" features Sean Paul with additional ad-libs by Lil Jon. The single was released to US radio stations on 20 October 2009 and released as a digital download on iTunes on 2 November 2009. It has also entered the top ten of the Hot 100 chart, during the week end of 9 January 2010. That same week, "Down" was also at No. 7, thus doubling Sean's presence within the top ten. Like the first single, "Do You Remember" has also sold more than a million copies in the United States.

== Critical reception ==
Professional ratings
Review scores
Source	Rating
AllMusic	3.5/5 stars
Billboard	72/100
BBC Music	favourable
DesiHits	4/5 stars
The Guardian	3/5 stars
The Independent	favourable
OK!	4/5 stars
Slant Magazine	2/5 stars
The Telegraph	3/5 stars
Yahoo! Music	4/10 stars

The album received mixed reviews on Metacritic, earning a score of 59 out of 100, based on 5 reviews. In North America, Billboard gave the album a score of 72 out of 100, concluding that "The saying goes: If it isn't broken, don't fix it." David Jeffries of AllMusic gave the album 3.5 out of 5 stars, stating that "All or Nothing is a strong U.S. debut for this Akon-meets-Chris Brown-styled singer, one that takes advantage of his suave back catalog and the hip new possibilities now possible via Cash Money." DesiHits gave the album 4 out of 5 stars, stating that "Jay Sean's smooth vocals and emotional lyrics make his album a treat for all." Spartanburg Herald-Journal, owned by The New York Times Company, also gave the album a largely positive review, stating that "Sean demonstrates a flair for harmonious R&B that will undoubtedly continue the success he has already achieved." In the Netherlands, FOK! also gave the album a positive review, giving it a rating of 4 out of 5 stars.

In the United Kingdom, Caroline Sullivan of The Guardian gave the album 3 out of 5 stars, stating, "The only signs of Britishness are the drum'n'bass foundations of If I Ain't Got You and a duet with ex-Sugababe Keisha Buchanan on Far Away – a performance of such weediness that it could only be by two Brits. A collaboration with Craig David, Stuck in the Middle, is much more vigorous. The rest is glossy, super-catchy R&B that should finally establish him in the UK." Neil McCormick of The Telegraph also gave the album 3 out of 5 stars, stating, "You'll find no evidence of his London or Punjabi roots on Jay Sean's formulaic third album, but his sleekly effective R’n’B pop has made him arguably the most successful British urban artist ever. His single Down topped US charts this year. Sean specialises in structurally concise, melodic, romantic songs delivered in a clear, sweet voice to a gushing, synthetic backdrop. Bland but effective." Mike Diver of BBC Music stated that the album is a mainstream, "polished, chart-conquering affair," reminiscent of "the slick RnB/soul of numerous US pop stars", but that it is detached from his British Asian Underground roots (alongside the Rishi Rich Project) that had characterized his debut album Me Against Myself (2004) and, to a much lesser extent, his second album My Own Way (2008).

== Commercial performance ==
The first week sales of All or Nothing in the United States were 32,000 copies. It debuted at No. 37 on the Billboard 200 and at No. 22 on the Digital Albums chart. It dropped to No. 87 on the Billboard 200 the following week, selling over 13,000 copies. As of 5 August 2013, the album has so far sold over 225,000 copies in the United States.

In the UK, where the album was released independently by Jayded Records, it debuted at No. 62 on the UK Albums Chart, No. 11 on the UK R&B Chart, and No. 2 on the UK Indie Albums Chart. It is his lowest charting album in the UK to date, largely due to many of its tracks already being available in the UK as part of his previous album My Own Way. Three songs from All or Nothing which were not released as official singles in the UK entered the UK Indie Singles Chart independently, based on downloads from the album, on the week of release: "Do You Remember" at No. 6, "Far Away" (featuring Keisha Buchanan) at No. 16, and "Stuck in the Middle" (featuring Craig David) at No. 20. "Ride It" also re-entered the UK Indie Singles Chart at No. 24, based on downloads from the All or Nothing album.

In Australia, the album has reached No. 67 on the ARIA Australian Albums Chart, on the week ending 15 February 2010. In Japan, the album debuted on the Japan Oricon Albums Chart at No. 13 on the week dated 1 March 2010. It rose to No. 11 the following week, dated 8 March 2010, making it Sean's highest-charting album in Japan.

== Track listing ==
US edition
No.	Title	Writer(s)	Producer(s)	Length
1.	"Do You"	Jay Sean; J. Cotter; Jeremy Skaller; Robert Larow; J. Perkins	J-Remy; Bobby Bass	4:05
2.	"Fire"	Sean; Cotter; Skaller; Larow	J-Remy; Bobby Bass	3:20
3.	"Down" (featuring Lil Wayne)	Sean; Cotter; Skaller; Larow; Perkins; Dwayne Carter, Jr.	J-Remy; Bobby Bass	3:32
4.	"Do You Remember" (featuring Sean Paul and Lil Jon)	Sean; Cotter; Frankie Storm; Skaller; Larow; Sean Paul Henriques; Jonathan Smith; Perkins	J-Remy; Bobby Bass	3:31
5.	"Ride It"	Sean; Alan Sampson	Sampson	3:01
6.	"Love Like This (Eternity)"	Sean; Cotter; Skaller; Larow; Perkins	J-Remy; Bobby Bass	3:38
7.	"If I Ain't Got You"	Sean; Cotter; Skaller; Larow; Perkins	J-Remy; Bobby Bass	3:18
8.	"War"	Sean; Cotter; Skaller; Larow; Perkins	J-Remy; Bobby Bass	3:45
9.	"Cry"	Sean; Cotter; Skaller; Larow; Perkins	J-Remy; Bobby Bass	4:35
10.	"All or Nothing"	Sean; Cotter; Skaller; Larow; Perkins	J-Remy; Bobby Bass	4:23
11.	"Stuck in the Middle" (featuring Jared Cotter)	Sean; Cotter; Skaller; Larow; Perkins	J-Remy; Bobby Bass	3:37
12.	"Stay"	Sean; Sampson	Sampson	3:39
13.	"Lights Off"	Sean; Cotter; Skaller; Larow; Claude Kelly	J-Remy; Bobby Bass	4:13
14.	"Down" (Candle Light Remix)	Sean; Cotter; Skaller; Larow; Perkins	J-Remy; Bobby Bass	3:15

US iTunes Store bonus track
No.	Title	Writer(s)	Producer(s)	Length
15.	"Down" (featuring Lil Wayne; Jason Nevins Remix)	Sean; Cotter; Skaller; Larow; Perkins	J-Remy; Bobby Bass; Jason Nevins^{[a]}	3:39

International edition
No.	Title	Writer(s)	Producer(s)	Length
1.	"Down" (featuring Lil Wayne)	Sean; Cotter; Skaller; Larow; Perkins; Carter	J-Remy; Bobby Bass	3:32
2.	"Fire"	Sean; Cotter; Skaller; Larow	J-Remy; Bobby Bass	3:20
3.	"Do You Remember" (featuring Sean Paul and Lil Jon)	Sean; Cotter; Storm; Skaller; Larow; Henriques; Smith; Perkins	J-Remy; Bobby Bass	3:31
4.	"Love Like This (Eternity)"	Sean; Cotter; Skaller; Larow; Perkins	J-Remy; Bobby Bass	3:39
5.	"Do You"	Sean; Cotter; Skaller; Larow; Perkins	J-Remy; Bobby Bass	4:04
6.	"War"	Sean; Cotter; Skaller; Larow; Perkins	J-Remy; Bobby Bass	3:45
7.	"If I Ain't Got You"	Sean; Cotter; Skaller; Larow; Perkins	J-Remy; Bobby Bass	3:19
8.	"Ride It"	Sean; Sampson	Sampson	3:00
9.	"Far Away" (featuring Keisha Buchanan)	Sean; Buchanan; Sampson; K. Jhooti	Sampson	3:32
10.	"Stuck in the Middle" (featuring Craig David)	Sean; Cotter; Skaller; Larow; Perkins	J-Remy; Bobby Bass	3:36
11.	"Lights Off"	Sean; Cotter; Skaller; Larow; C. Kelly	J-Remy; Bobby Bass	4:13
12.	"All or Nothing"	Sean; Cotter; Skaller; Larow; Perkins	J-Remy; Bobby Bass	4:22
13.	"Stay"	Sean; Sampson	Sampson	3:38
14.	"Cry"	Sean; Cotter; Skaller; Larow; Perkins	J-Remy; Bobby Bass	4:36

UK bonus tracks
No.	Title	Writer(s)	Producer(s)	Length
15.	"Down" (Candle Light Remix)	Sean; Cotter; Skaller; Larow; Perkins	J-Remy; Bobby Bass	3:15
16.	"Stay" (Boy Better Know Mix; featuring Chipmunk, Skepta, Frisco & Jammer)	Sean; Sampson	Sampson; Boy Better Know^{[a]}	3:37

Japan bonus tracks
No.	Title	Writer(s)	Producer(s)	Length
15.	"I'm Gone"	Sean; Tim Woodcock; Paul Meehan	Woodcock; Meehan	3:15
16.	"Walking Alone"	Sean; Mikkel S. Eriksen; Hallgeir Rustan; Tor Erik Hermansen	StarGate	3:37
17.	"Down" (Candle Light Remix)	Sean; Cotter; Skaller; Larow; Perkins	J-Remy; Bobby Bass	3:15
18.	"Down" (featuring Lil Wayne; Jason Nevins Remix)	Sean; Cotter; Skaller; Larow; Perkins	J-Remy; Bobby Bass; Nevins^{[a]}	3:39

Notes

- ^{^[a]} signifies additional producer(s)

== Personnel ==
Credits for All or Nothing adapted from AllMusic.

- Amit – photography
- Jared Cotter – background vocals
- Brian "Big Bass" Gardner – mastering
- Claude Kelly – background vocals
- Naroop – photography
- Alan Sampson – instrumentation
- Jay Sean – vocals, additional production
- Ronald "Slim" Williams – executive producer

== Charts ==
=== Weekly charts ===
Weekly chart performance for All or Nothing
Chart (2009–2010)	Peak position
Australian Albums (ARIA)	67
Belgian Albums (Ultratop Flanders)	85
French Albums (SNEP)	168
Japanese Albums (Oricon)	37
Scottish Albums (Official Charts)	92
UK Albums (Official Charts)	62
UK Independent Albums (Official Charts)	2
UK R&B Albums (Official Charts)	11
US Billboard 200	37

=== Year-end charts ===
Year-end chart performance for All or Nothing
Chart (2010)	Position
US Billboard 200	182

== Certifications ==
Certifications for All or Nothing
Region	Certification	Certified units/sales
New Zealand (RMNZ)	Platinum	15,000^{‡}
^{‡} Sales+streaming figures based on certification alone.

== Release history ==
All or Nothing release history
Region	Date	Label	Ref(s)
United States	23 November 2009	Cash Money; Universal Republic	
Canada	23 November 2009	Cash Money; Universal Republic	
United Kingdom	30 November 2009	Jayded; 2Point9	
Japan	17 February 2010	Universal Music Group	
Various	28 February 2010	Universal Music Group	
