= My Own Way (album) =

Studio album by Jay Sean
- Released: 12 May 2008
- Recorded: 2006–2008
- Genre: R&B
- Length: 52:24 (standard edition); 77:02 (deluxe edition)
- Labels: Jayded; 2Point9
- Producers: Jay Sean; Alan Sampson; The Underdogs; JRemy; Bobby Bass; Duro; DJ Swivel; Claude Kelly; Edwin 'Lil Eddie' Serano; Jared Cotter

Jay Sean chronology
Me Against Myself (2004)	My Own Way (2008)	All or Nothing (2009)

Singles from My Own Way
- 1. "Ride It" Released: 21 January 2008; 2. "Maybe" Released: 14 April 2008; 3. "Stay" Released: 30 June 2008; 4. "Tonight" Released: 18 January 2009

My Own Way is the second studio album by British contemporary R&B singer Jay Sean, released 12 May 2008 on Jayded Records and 2Point9 Records. Recording sessions took place from 2006 to 2009. Production was handled by Jay Sean and several other recording producers, including Jared Cotter, JRemy and DJ Swivel, including others. The album peaked at number six on the UK Albums Chart. It produced three singles and the deluxe edition had one more single. Upon its release, My Own Way received mixed reviews from critics.

== Background ==
The album was initially named after the title track "Deal with It", but the song ended up being given to Corbin Bleu. However, Sean's background vocals remain on Bleu's version of the track. The song "Deal with It" earned Sean a BMI Songwriter Award and was later covered by South Korean band Shinee who released it as the 2009 single "Juliette".

The album was renamed My Own Way and was originally slated for a 3 December 2007 release. However, due to a majority of the tracks being leaked it was pushed back numerous times to 31 March 2008 and again to 28 April 2008. Eventually it was released on 12 May 2008.

Speaking in March 2008 to noted UK R&B writer Pete Lewis - Deputy Editor of the award-winning Blues & Soul - Jay explained the thinking behind the album's title: "It's pretty much self-explanatory really. This whole entire project has been like my little baby - in terms of me nurturing it, making it, watching it grow, and having really hands-on creative control. You know, 'I wannt work with this person... I want to write a song like this... I want this to be the single... I want these video directors'... And everyone around me in my team has been amazing and has just trusted me to call the shots."

The album features production by J Remy, Jose E Duran, Robert Larow, Bobby Bass and Alan Sampson. It was recorded in New York and London and mixed by "Supa Engineer Duro" with Jordan "DJ Swivel" Young in New York City. Jared Cotter co-wrote six songs on the album.

== Singles ==
- The first single from the album, "Ride It", released on 21 January 2008 and debuted on the UK Singles Chart at No. 11. It was successful in Eastern Europe, especially in Russia, Turkey and Romania, where it became one of the three best-selling singles of the year. Sean released a Hindi version of the song for the Indian release of My Own Way. In 2019, the song was remixed by Kosovan DJ Regard and became a viral hit on the TikTok app.
- "Maybe", the album's second single, released on 21 April 2008 and debuted on the UK Singles Chart at No. 19. It was also successful in Japan, where it reached No. 7 on the Japan Hot 100 Singles. A Hindi version sung by Sean was released as part of My Own Way in India. A Mandarin Chinese cover version by Coco Lee has also been released in China.
- The album's third single, "Stay", was released on 7 July but failed to enter the UK Top 40. Sean also sung a Hindi version of the song for the Indian release of My Own Way.

Deluxe edition

- "Tonight" was released on 26 January 2009 as the first single off the re-pack of My Own Way.

== Reception ==
=== Commercial performance ===
The album was moderately successful in the UK, reaching No. 6 on the UK Albums Chart and #1 on the UK R&B Chart. A Hindi version of the album was also released in India. Sean's record label stated that the album sold more than 350,000 copies worldwide. It has been certified silver in the United Kingdom.

=== Critical response ===
Professional ratings
Review scores
Source	Rating
AllMusic	2.5/5 stars
The Guardian	3/5 stars

The album received mixed reviews from critics. Paul Clarke of BBC Music noted, "From one angle Ride It – Jay Sean's comeback single from last year – saw the Hounslow-born artist in exactly the same place as he was when he broke through in 2003 with Dance With You: Talking about cruising the clubs and making eyes at the ladies." DesiHits stated that it is "the biggest album to hit the Urban Desi scene of late and just listening to the album stripping away all the hype all the glamour it’s plain to see Jay's created an album that you can sit back, relax and enjoy."

Angus Batey of The Guardian stated, "My Own Way is a decent record, but erroneously titled...He has lost - not for ever, one hopes - the stuff that made him stand out", in comparison to his experimental debut album Me Against Myself (2004). Sean later responded that the reason he gave up on the Indian-R&B fusion music that he helped popularize is because it had eventually become too common in Asian Underground and Indian pop music.

== Track listing ==
Standard edition
No.	Title	Writer(s)	Producer(s)	Length
1.	"Ride It"	Sean; Alan Sampson	Sampson	3:10
2.	"Maybe"	Sampson; Jose Duran	Sampson; J-Remy; Bobby Bass	3:10
3.	"I Won't Tell" (featuring Daytona)	Sean; Cotter; Skaller; Larow; Perkins	J-Remy; Bobby Bass	3:20
4.	"Stay"	Sean; Sampson	Sampson	3:39
5.	"Stuck in the Middle" (featuring Jared Cotter)	Sean; Cotter; Skaller; Larow; Perkins	J-Remy; Bobby Bass	3:38
6.	"Good Enough"	Sean; Skaller; Larow; Nina Woodford; Peter Biker; Karsten Dahlgaard	J-Remy; Bobby Bass	4:02
7.	"Cry"	Sean; Cotter; Skaller; Larow; Perkins	J-Remy; Bobby Bass	4:36
8.	"All or Nothing"	Sean; Cotter; Skaller; Larow; Perkins	J-Remy; Bobby Bass	4:07
9.	"Runaway"	Sean; Skaller; Larow	J-Remy; Bobby Bass	3:48
10.	"Waiting"	Sean; Skaller; Larow; Claude Kelly	J-Remy; Bobby Bass	4:06
11.	"Used to Love Her"	Sean; Skaller; Larow; J. Cotter; Edwin "Lil Eddie" Serano; J. Perkins	J-Remy; Bobby Bass	3:47
12.	"Just a Friend"	Sean; Sampson	Sampson	3:41
13.	"Murder" (featuring Thara)	Sean; DJ Swivel; Serrano; Duran	DJ Swivel	3:59
14.	"Easy as 1,2,3"	Sean; Sampson	Sampson	3:19

Revised pressing
No.	Title	Writer(s)	Length
2.	"Maybe" (JRemy & Bobby Bass Remix)	Alan Sampson, Jose Duran	3:20
3.	"I Won't Tell" (featuring Sway)	J-Remy & Bobby Bass, Jay Sean, J Skaller, R Larow, J Cotter	3:18

Japanese edition bonus track
No.	Title	Writer(s)	Length
15.	"Maybe" (DJ Komori Remix)	Alan Sampson, Jose Duran	4:37

Russian edition bonus tracks
No.	Title	Writer(s)	Length
15.	"Ride It" (Ishi Hip Hop Mix)	Alan Sampson, Jay Sean, Andre Luis Reyes	3:21
16.	"Ride It" (Ishi Desi Mix)	Alan Sampson, Jay Sean, Andre Luis Reyes	3:20
17.	"Maybe" (Panjabi Hit Squad Remix)	Alan Sampson, Jose Duran	3:13
18.	"Maybe" (Guy Robin Edit)	Alan Sampson, Jose Duran	4:15
19.	"Maybe" (Agent X Remix)	Alan Sampson, Jose Duran	4:51
20.	"Ride It" (Ivan Martin Club Mix)	Alan Sampson, Jay Sean, Andre Luis Reyes	5:59

Hindi edition bonus tracks
No.	Title	Writer(s)	Length
1.	"Ride It" (Kya Yehi Pyarr Hai)	Alan Sampson, Jay Sean, Andre Luis Reyes	3:13
2.	"Maybe" (Shayad)	Alan Sampson, Jose Duran	3:31
3.	"Stay" (Tu Rahe)	Alan Sampson, Jay Sean	3:30
4.	"I Won't Tell" (featuring Sway)	J-Remy & Bobby Bass, Jay Sean, J Skaller, R Larow, J Cotter	3:18
15.	"Maybe" (JRemy & Bobby Bass Remix)	Alan Sampson, Jose Duran	3:20
16.	"Stay"	Alan Sampson, Jay Sean	3:39
17.	"Ride It"	Alan Sampson, Jay Sean, Andre Luis Reyes	3:10

2009 deluxe edition
No.	Title	Writer(s)	Length
1.	"Ride It"	Alan Sampson, Jay Sean, Andre Luis Reyes	3:10
2.	"Tonight"	Kamaljit Singh, Claude Kelly, J-Remy, Bobby Bass, J Perkins	3:42
3.	"Maybe" (JRemy & Bobby Bass Remix)	Alan Sampson, Jose Duran	3:20
4.	"I Won't Tell" (featuring Sway) (2009 Remix)	J-Remy & Bobby Bass, Jay Sean, J Skaller, R Larow, J Cotter	3:37
5.	"Stay"	Alan Sampson, Jay Sean	3:39
6.	"Stuck in the Middle" (featuring Jared Cotter)	J-Remy & Bobby Bass, Jay Sean, J Skaller, R Larow, J Cotter	3:38
7.	"All or Nothing"	J-Remy & Bobby Bass, Jay Sean, J Skaller, Jared Cotter, R Larow, J Perkins	4:07
8.	"Never Been in Love"	Jay Sean, Sampson	3:28
9.	"Cry"	J-Remy & Bobby Bass, Jose Duran	4:36
10.	"Good Enough"	J-Remy & Bobby Bass, Jay Sean, Nina Woodford, Peter Biker, Karsten Dahlgaard	4:02
11.	"Used to Love Her"	J-Remy & Bobby Bass, Jay Sean, J Skaller, Jared Cotter, R Larow, Edwin 'Lil Eddie' Serano, J Perkins	3:47
12.	"Waiting"	J-Remy & Bobby Bass, Jay Sean, J Skaller, R Larow, Claude Kelly	4:06
13.	"Runaway"	J-Remy & Bobby Bass, Jay Sean	3:48
14.	"Just a Friend"	Alan Sampson, Jay Sean	3:41
15.	"Murder" (featuring Thara)	DJ Swivel, Edwin "Lil Eddie" Serrano, Jose Duran, Thara, Jay Sean	3:59
16.	"Easy as 1,2,3"	Alan Sampson, Jay Sean	3:19
17.	"I'm Gone"	Jay Sean, K Jhooti, Paul Meehan, Tim Woodcock	3:16
18.	"Ride It" (Ishi Hip Hop Mix)	Alan Sampson, Jay Sean, Andre Luis Reyes	3:21
19.	"Maybe" (Panjabi Hit Squad Remix)	Alan Sampson, Jose Duran	3:13
20.	"Stay" (Boy Better Know Remix) (featuring Chipmunk, Skepta, Frisco & Jammer)	Alan Sampson, Jay Sean	3:37
21.	"Tonight" (FP Radio Edit)	Kamaljit Singh, Claude Kelly, J-Remy, Bobby Bass, J Perkins	3:25

== Charts ==
Chart performance for My Own Way
Chart (2008)	Peak position
Japanese Albums (Oricon)	68
Scottish Albums (Official Charts)	39
UK Albums (Official Charts)	6
UK R&B Albums (Official Charts)	1

== Release history ==
Release history for My Own Way
Region	Date
United Kingdom	12 May 2008; 16 February 2009 (deluxe)
India	18 August 2008
Poland	22 August 2008
