= Abbas Farid =

British freestyle footballer

- Born: 10 October 1983 (age 42); Newport, Wales
- Citizenship: Newport, South Wales
- Occupation: Freestyle Footballer

Abbas Farid (born 10 October 1983) is a British freestyle footballer from Newport, South Wales. Farid is of Pakistani descent.

In June 2003, Abbas was named the Freestyle King on MTV in UK's Nike Freestyle competition, becoming the winner chosen from over 30,000 competitors. He subsequently featured in several music videos for bhangra/desi artists, such as in Jay Sean's music video of Dance with You (Nachna Tere Naal). Abbas has done many performances at football stadiums such as Stamford Bridge, Stade de France, San Siro etc. He still performs at other Sporting/Corporate events and other media promotions around UK and throughout the World. In July 2008 Abbas set a new Guinness World Record of 88 Heel Juggles in 60 seconds.

== See also ==
- Freestyle football
- World Freestyle Football Association
