= Walking Alone =

Walking Alone may refer to:

- "Walking Alone", a 1997 song by Green Day from Nimrod
- "Walking Alone", a 2009 song by Jay Sean from All or Nothing
