= Eyes on You (Jay Sean song) =

2004 single by Jay Sean

Single by Jay Sean featuring the Rishi Rich Project

from the album Me Against Myself
- B-side: "Me Against Myself"
- Released: 21 June 2004
- Length: 3:12
- Label: 2Point9; Relentless; Virgin
- Songwriters: Jay Sean; Hallgeir Rustan
- Producers: Rishi Rich; Stargate

Jay Sean singles chronology
"Dance with You" (2003)	"Eyes on You" (2004)	"Stolen" (2004)

"Eyes on You" is a song by British singer Jay Sean featuring the Rishi Rich Project, released on 21 June 2004 as the second single from Sean's debut album, Me Against Myself (2004). The album's first single, "Dance with You", was released with Sean as part of the Rishi Rich Project, making "Eyes on You" his debut single as a lead artist. The song reached number six on the UK Singles Chart and number 18 in the Netherlands.

== Music video ==
The song's music video is Jay Sean's second, after "Dance with You (Nachna Tere Naal)". It features two Seans, one a singer and the other a rapper. Throughout the music video, Jay Sean is depicted with various British Asians (of South Asian origin). It starts with Jay Sean the rapper trying to enter his locked up studio where Rishi Rich and Juggy D are already there. Jay Sean manages to get the door open. Just before he enters his studio room, a British flag and a Pakistani flag are shown adorning the doorknob. He finds that there is another Jay Sean there, the singer. He follows Jay Sean the singer to a party, where Rishi Rich, Juggy D and Madhu Singh, among others, are present. The two Jay Seans eventually face-off against each other in a rap battle where Jay Sean the singer emerges the victor.

== Track listings ==
UK CD1 and European CD single

1. "Eyes on You" (radio mix) – 3:12
2. "Me Against Myself" (Jay Sean vs Jay Sean) – 3:13

UK CD2

1. "Eyes on You" (radio mix) – 3:12
2. "Eyes on You" (video edit) – 3:40
3. "Eyes on You" (Rishi's Rich club mix) – 3:54
4. "Eyes on You" (Drew's soul remix) – 3:30
5. "Dance with You" (Laxman remix) – 3:04
6. "Eyes on You" (video)

UK 12-inch single

A1. "Eyes on You" (Rishi's Rich club mix) – 3:53
A2. "Eyes on You" (radio mix) – 3:12
B1. "Eyes on You" (Rishi Rich Bouncement remix) – 3:44
B2. "Me Against Myself" (Jay Sean vs Jay Sean) – 3:13

== Charts ==
=== Weekly charts ===
Chart (2004–2005)	Peak position
Netherlands (Dutch Top 40)	32
Netherlands (Single Top 100)	18
Scottish Singles Sales (Official Charts)	28
UK Singles (Official Charts)	6
UK Hip Hop/R&B (Official Charts)	2

=== Year-end charts ===
Chart (2004)	Position
UK Singles (OCC)	102
