= Thinking About You (Hardwell song) =

Single by Hardwell featuring Jay Sean
- Released: 14 October 2016
- Genre: R&B
- Length: 3:11
- Label: Cloud 9 Dance; Epic Amsterdam; Sony
- Songwriters: Robbert van de Corput; Jaap Reesema; Parrish Warrington; Diederik Van Elsas; Joren Van Der Voort; RaajShady
- Producers: Hardwell; Trackside

Hardwell singles chronology
"No Holding Back" (2016)	"Thinking About You" (2016)	"Creatures of the Night" (2017)

Jay Sean singles chronology
"Make My Love Go" (2016)	"Thinking About You" (2016)	"Do You Love Me" (2017)

"Thinking About You" is a song by Dutch DJ and record producer Hardwell, featuring English singer Jay Sean. It was released as a digital download on 14 October 2016 by Sony Music.

== Music video ==
A one-minute snippet preview of the song is released on Hardwell's official YouTube channel on 14 October 2016. The music video for the song was filmed in Amsterdam, Netherlands. The music video was released on 28 October 2016 on Hardwell's YouTube official channel. It features Candice Heiden as the main skater. A lyrics video of the song is also released, it features Amanda Reifer of Cover Drive.

== Track listing ==
Digital download
No.	Title	Length
1.	"Thinking About You"	3:11

Digital download
No.	Title	Length
1.	"Thinking About You" (Hardwell & KAAZE Festival Mix)	5:38

== Credits ==
- Producer – Hardwell, Trackside
- Vocals – Jay Sean
- Lyrics – Jaap Reesema and Joren Van Der Voort
- Label: Sony

== Charts ==
Chart (2016)	Peak position
Belgium (Ultratip Bubbling Under Flanders)	46
Belgium (Ultratip Bubbling Under Wallonia)	40
Czech Republic Airplay (ČNS IFPI)	100
Netherlands (Dutch Top 40)	34
Netherlands (Single Top 100)	64
US Hot Dance/Electronic Songs (Billboard)	40

== Release history ==
Region	Date	Format	Label
United States	14 October 2016	CD; digital download	Sony
United States	14 February 2017	Contemporary hit radio	Epic
