= Down (Jay Sean song) =

2009 song by Jay Sean featuring Lil Wayne

Single by Jay Sean featuring Lil Wayne

from the album All or Nothing
- Released: 30 June 2009
- Recorded: 2008–2009
- Genre: Electropop; R&B
- Length: 3:32 (single version); 3:17 (without rap)
- Label: Jayded; 2Point9; Cash Money; Universal Republic
- Songwriters: Kamaljit Jhooti; Dwayne Carter; Jared Cotter; J-Remy; Bobby Bass; Jonathan Perkins
- Producer: Orange Factory Music

Jay Sean singles chronology
"Tonight" (2009)	"Down" (2009)	"Written on Her" (2009)

Lil Wayne singles chronology
"Maybach Music 2" (2009)	"Down" (2009)	"Every Girl" (2009)

Music video
- "Down" on YouTube

"Down" is a song by British-American singer Jay Sean featuring American rapper and labelmate Lil Wayne. The song was released in North America as his debut single from his first album there, All or Nothing. In other markets, including the United Kingdom, the song serves as Jay Sean's lead single from his third studio album. Produced by J-Remy and Bobby Bass, "Down" is the seventh-best selling single of 2009 and has been certified Platinum in several countries. The song went on to sell ten million copies in the United States.

The track was released to digital retailers on 30 June 2009 and US radio on 27 July 2009. "Down" hit number one on the Billboard Hot 100 chart in the issue dated 17 October 2009, unseating "I Gotta Feeling" by The Black Eyed Peas after their 14-week reign at number one. This made Jay Sean the first British act to score a Billboard Hot 100 number-one single since Coldplay's "Viva la Vida" in 2008, and the fourth British act overall in the 2000s decade. Jay Sean's release of "Down" made him the first solo artist of South Asian origin to top Billboard's Hot 100, and the first British artist of Indian descent to do so since Freddie Mercury. The song also made him "the first UK urban act ever to top Billboard's Hot 100", and the first British act to have reached number one in the United States and not in the United Kingdom with a song since Seal's "Kiss from a Rose" in 1995. It was also the best-selling single by a British and European male artist in North America since Elton John's "Candle in the Wind" in 1997, and the first by a British Asian artist since Freddie Mercury in 1980.

== History ==
=== Development ===
On 15 October 2008, at the MOBO Awards, Jay Sean announced that he had signed with the American hip hop record label Cash Money Records. He explained, "It's always been a dream for me to sign to an American label. And it's great to be accepted by the best in the game."

It was rumoured that his first single in the US would be a remix of the single, "Tonight" featuring Lil Wayne. In fact, a remix had not been produced, but the song "Down" which originally began recording in December 2008. Jay Sean and Lil Wayne co-wrote the song with Jared Cotter, Jonathan Perkins, J-Remy, and Bobby Bass. It was also produced by J-Remy and Bobby Bass. The track was originally for My Own Way: Deluxe Edition without Lil Wayne, alongside "War". The CEO of Cash Money Ronald "Slim" Williams liked the track, played it to Wayne and wanted Wayne to be on the track; Wayne loved it and added a new verse on the track.

Sean told MTV News that he recorded this song in 90 minutes, after which he received a call from Ronald "Slim" Williams. He recalled: "Slim called me up and was like, 'Yo, man, there's something wrong on the second verse that just doesn't sound right.' I was like, 'Really? What?' He played the song. All of a sudden I heard Wayne's Auto-Tune stuff, and I'm like, 'OK. What's going on? Right! That's Lil Wayne on my song right now!' That day was brilliant."

"The news was on, everything was depressing and we were like 'look at this man – everything's so down in the dumps. Why don't we write a song to take everyone's mind away from being down?'" explains Sean about how the track came about during a late night recording session in Miami's Hit Factory studio. According to Sean, "Wayne heard it, fell in love and dropped a verse on it," which resulted in the up-tempo summer record peppered with Wayne's gritty pipes.

=== After the release ===
The BBC reported in 2009 that Jay Sean became "The Most Successful Male U.K. Urban artist in U.S chart history". "I want to do my best to represent the UK in America and let people really understand that it doesn't matter if we're from a little place called Hounslow. As long as you work hard and strive to do you best and make good music, and of course with a bit of luck, it is possible," Jay told the BBC. The success of "Down" has also led to Sean being considered the most successful European urban artist in North America.

When the track topped the Billboard Hot 100, Jay Sean was on stage with labelmate Lil Wayne, on the first night of the US rapper's London concert tour. Before he returned to the US, Jay Sean was asked, "How does it feel to have the top song of the week?", and replied, "This is insane. It's just incredible to have reached number one with my first release in America. It's difficult for me to put into words. My head is spinning. I've been grinding hard for the last seven years releasing records independently and now to have the biggest record in the USA this week. It's just a dream come true." The second time the song hit number one, he was performing at "The Justin Timberlake and Friends Concert Benefiting Shriners Hospitals For Children" on 17 October 2009 with Justin Timberlake.

== Music video ==
The music video for "Down" was produced alongside the video for "Written on Her". The "Down" video was first shot in London on 24 April 2009, with Cash Money crew without Lil Wayne. The video was shot over two days. The Buckinghamshire mansion featured is Hedsor House, an enormous private mansion and park where Mark Ronson hosted his 33rd birthday and where scenes for the feature film The Golden Compass were filmed. The video was completed in Miami, with Jay Sean heading to the US to finish the video with Lil Wayne on 20 May 2009. The video features Hispanic American model Korrina Rico as the lead lady, dancers, bright blue lights and bottles. The video was produced by Shurwin Beckford and directed by Richard Pengelley for Jayded Entertainment/Guerilla Hype/Hey Buddy and edited by Jamie Mac and Adam Wood. During the rap break, Lil Wayne is seen wearing a red T-shirt with the word 'COMMUNIST' in white capitalized letters. The prelude of his previous single "Ride It" can be heard in the music video as the introduction to this song.

On 23 July 2009, the video premiered on Jay Sean's YouTube page; it was the number one most viewed music video on YouTube for its first two weeks and had over 5 million views as of 24 December 2009. During the week of 10 August 2009, the music video was featured as iTunes' Free Music Video of the Week. The video was added to MTV's rotation on 5 August 2009 include MTV Hits and MTV U.S.A. The video was also added to the Universal Music Group's channel where the video had more than 20 million views as of 23 November 2009. The video was added to the Island Records channel where his UK fans can see the video, which had around 5 million views as of 20 December 2009. The video was also added to the Jay Sean Vevo channel, where it has more than 300 million views as of November 2021. Chipmunk and Tinie Tempah make cameo appearances in the video.

== Reception ==
=== Critical reception ===
The song received generally favorable reviews. Ginger Clements from Billboard gave the song a positive review, stating that Jay Sean's "melodic vocals [...] resonate with impressive tonal clarity". Billboard gave the song a score of 91/100. Alex MacGregor of UK Mix gave the song 4 out of 5 stars, stating that it "is actually a creditable offering of world beating R&B-pop that reminds the listener of some of the better moments in Usher's back catalogue."

=== In popular culture ===
The song was in the "Canon" episode of Melrose Place. "Weird Al" Yankovic covered "Down" as part of "Polka Face," the polka medley from his 2011 album Alpocalypse.

"Down" has been used and covered in numerous user videos on YouTube, including a breast cancer awareness video by the Providence St. Vincent Medical Center. A cover version of the song was also performed on the episode 2 of The Sing-Off by the a cappella group Nota. After Nota went on to win the contest during the finale, Sean himself made an appearance, performing "Down" with the group in the show's ending. DJ Bikram Keith and DJ Vix made a "Desi Remix" to "Down". At the Grammy Awards 2010, where Jay Sean was, Taylor Swift stated that "Down" was her favorite song of 2009.

In early December 2009, the song appeared at number 20 on the Billboard Year-End Hot 100 singles of 2009. As a result, the single was also included on DJ Earworm's mash-up of all the top 25 Billboard hits of the year. The song also appeared at number 14 on the Billboard Year-End Pop Songs of 2009. Later in the month, it appeared at number 4 on Z100's Top 100 Songs of 2009. It also appeared on VH1's Top 40 Music Videos of 2009 List at number 20. Having sold more than three million digital copies in the United States alone, "Down" is the seventh-best-selling single of 2009, in a year noted for having the highest record sales of all time.

The song has been made into a playable track on the Kinect game Dance Central for the Xbox 360 which was released on 4 November 2010.

== Live performance ==
After the track was leaked on the Internet on 21 May 2009, Jay Sean performed the "Without Rap" version of the track for the first time live in Chicago. He has also performed the track on Macy's Thanksgiving Day Parade, in Toronto, on Jimmy Kimmel Live!, on Madison Square Garden, alongside "Do You Remember", on The Wendy Williams Show, on BBC 1Xtra Live 2009, an "acoustic version" for Billboard and Yahoo! Music, and the "Candle Light Remix" for BBC Radio 1. On 21 December 2009, he performed the song on The Sing-Off with the winning group Nota.

== Chart performance ==
"Down" debuted at number 72 on the Billboard Hot 100 for the chart week of 6 August 2009, and stayed at number two for three weeks. After fourteen weeks on the chart, the song reached number one for the chart week ending 17 October 2009, making Jay Sean the first Indian-origin solo artist to achieve a number-one single in the US. "Down" ended The Black Eyed Peas' 26-week reign at the number-one spot on the Hot 100. Furthermore, "Down" had managed to top one of the most competitive weeks in the US charts this decade, with the top five titles (Sean's "Down", Miley Cyrus' "Party in the U.S.A.", Jay Z's "Run This Town", Jason Derulo's "Whatcha Say", and Black Eyed Peas' "I Gotta Feeling") being "separated by the tightest point margin in more than six years." After spending a week at the top spot, "Down" was succeeded by Britney Spears' "3", but the following week, it returned to number one. On the Canadian Hot 100, it debuted at number 40 for the week of 17 August 2009, and peaked at number three for the week of 15 October 2009. The song also peaked at number one on Billboard's Pop Songs, Radio Songs (airplay), and Rhythmic Top 40 charts, and number two on the Digital Songs (sales) chart. Since its release, it has sold over 4,000,000 downloads.

Internationally, the song was an instant success. On the Recorded Music NZ, "Down" debuted at number 18, and after six weeks the song peaked at number two (where it spent four weeks) for the week of 5 November 2009. On Sweden's Sverigetopplistan, "Down" debuted at number 52 and, in its second week, and peaked at number 29, beginning on 5 November 2009, where it spent ten weeks at that position. In Switzerland, for the week of 8 October 2009, the song debuted on the Swiss Music Charts at number 65 and peaked at number 57 five weeks later. The single debuted at number nine on 22 October 2009, on the Norwegian Singles Chart and peaked at number five two weeks later. In the UK, "Down" entered and peaked at number three on the UK Singles Chart and spent one week at number one on the UK R&B Chart. It is his highest-charting single in the UK since "Stolen" charted at number four in 2004.

On the Austrian Singles Chart, "Down" debuted at number 70 for the week beginning of 5 November 2009, and peaked at number 52. On the Australian ARIA Charts, the song debuted at number nine that same week and peaked at number two three weeks later. On the Belgian Singles Chart, the song peaked at number two. The song debuted at number nine on the European Hot 100 and number 94 on the Japan Hot 100 during the week dated 9 November 2009, and peaked at number 79 on the week dated 6 March 2010. The song debuted on the French SNEP chart at number 19 on 27 February 2010 then peaked at number 17, becoming Sean's second top twenty and Lil Wayne's fourth in France.

== Track listing ==
iTunes digital download

1. "Down" (featuring Lil Wayne) – 3:32

Promo US CD

1. "Down" (Clean featuring Lil Wayne) – 3:32
2. "Down" (Clean Without Rap) – 3:17
3. "Down" (Instrumental) – 3:32
4. "Down" (Bobbybass Dance Remix) – 4:00

UK single CD

1. "Down" (featuring Lil Wayne) – 3:32
2. "Down" (Jason Nevins Edit) – 3:39
3. "Down" (Roll Deep Mix) – 4:05
4. "Down" (K-Warren Remix) – 5:45
5. "Down" (Chasing Pluto Remix) – 3:47

== Charts ==
Jay Sean's first single with Cash Money Records and Universal Music Group (and his American-debut single), became his first number one single on the Billboard Hot 100 and first single to sell more than two million copies in America, and the second for featured artist Lil Wayne who first topped the chart for five weeks the previous year with "Lollipop" on the Hot 100.

"Down" entered the UK Singles Chart on 1 November 2009 at number 3, and number one on the R&B Chart, becoming Sean's highest-charting positions on both charts.

=== Weekly charts ===
Chart (2009–2011)	Peak position
Australia (ARIA)	2
Australian Urban (ARIA)	1
Austria (Ö3 Austria Top 40)	8
Belgium (Ultratop 50 Flanders)	32
Belgium (Ultratip Bubbling Under Wallonia)	2
Canada Hot 100 (Billboard)	3
CIS Airplay (TopHit)	35
Czech Republic Airplay (ČNS IFPI)	20
Denmark (Tracklisten)	7
Europe (European Hot 100 Singles)	9
France (SNEP)	17
Germany (GfK)	9
Hungary (Rádiós Top 40)	33
Ireland (IRMA)	10
Italy (FIMI)	30
Japan Hot 100 (Billboard)	79
Netherlands (Dutch Top 40)	17
Netherlands (Single Top 100)	31
New Zealand (Recorded Music NZ)	2
Norway (VG-lista)	5
Russia Airplay (TopHit)	22
Scottish Singles Sales (Official Charts)	4
Slovakia Airplay (ČNS IFPI)	1
Sweden (Sverigetopplistan)	25
Switzerland (Schweizer Hitparade)	8
UK Hip Hop/R&B (Official Charts)	1
UK Singles (Official Charts)	3
US Billboard Hot 100	1
US Adult Pop Airplay (Billboard)	26
US Pop Airplay (Billboard)	1
US Rhythmic Airplay (Billboard)	1

=== Year-end charts ===
Chart (2009)	Position
Australia (ARIA)	34
Brazil (Crowley)	46
Canada (Canadian Hot 100)	40
Hungary (Rádiós Top 40)	153
New Zealand (Recorded Music NZ)	12
Russia Airplay (TopHit)	149
UK Singles (Official Charts Company)	64
US Billboard Hot 100	20
US Mainstream Top 40 (Billboard)	14
US Rhythmic (Billboard)	12

Chart (2010)	Position
Australia (ARIA)	66
Brazil (Crowley)	47
France (SNEP)	81
Netherlands (Dutch Top 40)	100
US Billboard Hot 100	41
US Mainstream Top 40 (Billboard)	46

Chart (2011)	Position
Germany (Official German Charts)	97

=== All-time charts ===
Chart (1992–2017)	Position
US Pop Songs (Billboard)	28

Chart (1958–2018)	Position
US Billboard Hot 100	128

== Certifications ==
Region	Certification	Certified units/sales
Australia (ARIA)	2× Platinum	140,000^{^}
Brazil (Pro-Música Brasil)	Gold	30,000^{‡}
Denmark (IFPI Danmark)	Platinum	90,000^{‡}
Germany (BVMI)	Gold	150,000^{‡}
New Zealand (RMNZ)	4× Platinum	120,000^{‡}
Sweden (GLF)	Platinum	20,000^{‡}
United Kingdom (BPI)	2× Platinum	1,200,000^{‡}
United States (RIAA)	Diamond	10,000,000^{‡}
^{^} Shipments figures based on certification alone.^{‡} Sales+streaming figures based on certification alone.

== Release history ==
Region	Date	Format	Label
United States	30 June 2009	Digital download	Cash Money
Canada	30 June 2009	Digital download	Cash Money
United States	27 July 2009	Contemporary hit radio	Cash Money
Norway	18 August 2009	Airplay	Universal Republic
Belgium	24 August 2009	Digital download	Universal Republic
France	24 August 2009	Digital download	Universal Republic
Sweden	24 August 2009	Digital download	Universal Republic
New Zealand	24 August 2009	Digital download	Universal Republic
United Kingdom	10 September 2009	Airplay	Jayded; 2Point9
Switzerland	23 September 2009	Digital download	Universal Republic
Norway	13 October 2009	Digital download	Universal Republic
United Kingdom	25 October 2009	CD; digital download	Jayded; 2Point9
Worldwide	31 October 2009	Digital download	Universal Republic

== Destine version ==
"Down"

Single by Destine

from the album Lightspeed (2011 Japan release)
- Released: 1 October 2010
- Recorded: 2010
- Genre: Pop punk
- Length: 3:19
- Label: Sony
- Songwriters: Kamaljit Jhooti; Dwayne Carter; Jared Cotter; J-Remy; Bobby Bass; Jonathan Perkins

Destine singles chronology
"Spiders" (2010)	"Down" (2010)	"Stay" (2011)

The Dutch pop punk band Destine released a cover version of "Down" as a stand-alone single on 1 October 2010 and as an iTunes download on 4 October. The official music video was meant to debut on EFM on 8 October, but was released through the band official YouTube page three days earlier on 5 October 2010, although it was deleted the next day. Their debut album, Lightspeed, was released on 3 August 2011 in Japan, and included "Down" as a bonus track.

=== Digital single ===
No.	Title	Length
1.	"Down"	3:19
2.	"Down (Instrumental Version)"	3:19

== Breathe Carolina version ==
"Down"

Single by Breathe Carolina

from the album Punk Goes Pop 3
- Released: 16 September 2010
- Recorded: 2010
- Genre: Electronicore
- Length: 3:42
- Label: Fearless
- Songwriters: Kamaljit Jhooti; Dwayne Carter; Jared Cotter; J-Remy; Bobby Bass; Jonathan Perkins
- Producer: Mike Green

Breathe Carolina singles chronology
"I.D.G.A.F." (2010)	"Down" (2010)	"Blackout" (2011)

Music video
- "Down" on YouTube

American electronicore band Breathe Carolina covered the track for the compilation album Punk Goes Pop 3, which was released on 2 November 2010. It was made available for streaming via their Facebook page on 15 September 2010, before it was released for digital download the following day. A music video including live footage of the band performing the song first premiered via AOL Music, before it was released elsewhere on 2 February 2011.

=== Background ===
Singer David Schmitt explained why the group chose the song to cover for the album as it "appealed to the band on a technical level" and how it "struck a chord with the way the duo talks."

=== Critical reception ===
Alternative Press named their version of the song as the 41st best "Top 50 Punk Goes Pop Covers of All Time", stating their version "left a bit to be desired." Substream Magazine placed their cover at number 30 on their "30 Best Punk Goes... Songs" list, writing, "if you take that screaming out, this really isn't that bad of a cover. Is it great? No, maybe not, but when you have to pick a song from Punk Goes X, your options are fairly limited." The Music wrote a negative response to the cover, describing it as "pretty much exactly the same as the original but with some poor Lil Wayne impersonations."

=== Charts ===
Chart performance for "Down"
Chart (2010)	Peak position
US Rock Digital Song Sales (Billboard)	31

== See also ==
- List of number-one R&B hits of 2009 (UK)
- List of Hot 100 number-one singles of 2009 (U.S.)
- List of Mainstream Top 40 number-one hits of 2009 (U.S.)
- List of Billboard Rhythmic number-one songs of the 2000s
