= Jared Cotter =

American singer (born 1981)

- Born: Jared Lincoln Cotter; June 17, 1981 (age 45); Oceanside, New York, U.S.
- Origin: Coram, New York, U.S.
- Genres: Pop; R&B; hip hop
- Occupations: Singer; songwriter; model
- Instrument: Vocals
- Years active: 2007–present
- Spouse: Melanie Fiona (m. 2020)

Jared Lincoln Cotter (born June 17, 1981) is an American R&B singer, songwriter, and model. He was a contestant on the sixth season of American Idol, and co-wrote Jay Sean's 2009 single "Down", which peaked at number one on the Billboard Hot 100.

Cotter has written songs for Carl Thomas, Joe, and Jay Sean.

== Biography ==
Born and raised on Long Island, Cotter grew up in a family of musicians. Cotter's great grandfather, James Reese Europe, was the first African American jazz player to perform at Carnegie Hall. Cotter's father, Robert Cotter, played in the late 1970s with Nile Rodgers and the late Bernard Edwards of the Big Apple Band, later known as Chic.

Cotter's recording career began when he was 15. He performed and released music as JL Cotter, and co-wrote songs such as "Make U Cry", "My Girl", "She Likes It" and the Notorious B.I.G inspired "Somebody's Gotta Go".

In 2004, he graduated from Five Towns College.

In 2005, he independently released "The Album Before the Album". The album was re-released after he appeared on Idol. He released a single "Good Morning" in October 2008.

Cotter released a five-song EP You Me Forever on July 1, 2014.

Cotter has performed on BET's 106 & Park, and opened for Avant. He has also performed at BB King's in Times Square, Village Underground, Soul Café and SOB's.

In 2007, he reached the semi-final stage of American Idol season 6. He sang Stevie Wonder's "Lately" for his audition.

He signed with EMI Music Publishing in 2009.

In 2009, Cotter co-wrote several songs on Jay Sean's album All or Nothing, including the number one song, "Down", which was the seventh-best selling single of 2009. In April 2010, he received an ASCAP award as a writer for one of the "Most Performed Songs" of the year.

Immediately after American Idol, in June 2007, Cotter joined as co-host for a daily show The Sauce on the television network Fuse TV. After The Sauce was cancelled in 2008, he hosted You Rock, Lets Roll, a dating game show, in the same time slot.

He also hosted Fuse's No. 1 Countdown: Pop where he presented videos and conducted interviews.

He has also worked for Fox TV’s Good Day New York as a weekly correspondent during later seasons of American Idol.

He was the host of The Challenge, a New York metropolitan area high school student quiz show on MSG Varsity internet service.

From 2014 to 2015, Cotter was the co-anchor for the syndicated The Daily Buzz program of Florida's Full Sail University.

In January 2017, he joined "The List" as co-host.

As of early 2024, Cotter was the talent manager for Paul Russell and was Shaboozey's co-talent manager. He was promoted to partner at Range Music.

Also in 2024, he started record label 3AM Entertainment with Jay Sean and Jeremy Skaller.

== Influences ==
Cotter has cited Stevie Wonder, Marvin Gaye and Brian McKnight as influences.

== Personal life ==
Cotter began dating Canadian singer-songwriter Melanie Fiona in 2013. On March 14, 2016, their first child was born. On Valentine's Day 2018, the couple became engaged. Originally they planned to marry on Amalfi Coast, Italy; but the COVID-19 pandemic forced them to postpone their wedding three times. The couple eloped on December 12, 2020 in Los Angeles. They welcomed a daughter in December 2021.

== Discography ==
=== Album ===
Title	Album details
The Album Before the Album	Release date: April 21, 2005; Label: On The Grind Entertainment; Format: CD, digital download

=== Extended plays ===
Title	Album details
You Me Forever	Release date: July 1, 2014; Label: Cotter Boy; Format: Digital download

=== Singles ===
Year	Title
2008	"Good Morning"
2011	"Finding Me" ft. Drew Ryan Scott
2012	"Mo'Thangs"
2014	"You Me Forever"

=== Charted songs with song-writing credits ===
Single	Year	Billboard Hot 100
"Down"	2009	1
"Do You Remember"	2010	10
"2012 (It Ain't the End)"	2010	31
"Hit the Lights"	2011	18
"Where Them Girls At"	2011	14

=== As featured artist ===
Song	Year	Album
Stuck in the Middle	2009	All or Nothing

== American Idol performances ==
Week #	Song Choice	Original Artist	Order #	Result
Top 24 (12 Men)	"Back at One"	Brian McKnight	10	Safe
Top 20 (10 Men)	"Let's Get It On"	Marvin Gaye	2	Safe
Top 16 (8 Men)	"If You Really Love Me"	Stevie Wonder	4	Eliminated
