= Me Against Myself =

Studio album by Jay Sean
- Released: 8 November 2004
- Recorded: 2003–2004
- Genres: Bhangra; R&B
- Length: 56:52
- Labels: 2Point9; Relentless; Virgin
- Producers: Rishi Rich; Jay Sean; Mentor; Iceman J; Stargate; Paul Brown; Fitzgerald Scott; Peter Biker; Karsten "Delgado" Dahlgaard

Jay Sean chronology
Me Against Myself (2004)	My Own Way (2008)

Singles from Me Against Myself
- 1. "Dance with You" Released: 8 September 2003; 2. "Eyes on You" Released: 21 June 2004; 3. "Stolen" Released: 25 October 2004

Me Against Myself is the debut studio album by Jay Sean, released on 8 November 2004 in the United Kingdom, by 2Point9 Records, Relentless Records, and Virgin Records.

== Commercial performance ==
The album includes three UK top-20 hit singles: "Dance with You" (No. 12), "Eyes on You" (No. 6), and "Stolen" (No. 4).

Despite initially failing to reach the top 20 on the UK Albums Chart (where it peaked at No. 29), the album gradually managed to sell 100,000 copies in the UK and went on to become a substantial hit in Asia. "Dance with You" and "One Night" were included on the soundtracks for the Bollywood films Boom (2003) and Kyaa Kool Hai Hum (2005), with Sean making an appearance in the latter, while the Bollywood actress Bipasha Basu made an appearance in the music video for the song "Stolen". This helped Me Against Myself sell over two million copies and become five-times platinum in India. Beyond India, the album sold over 300,000 copies across other parts of the world, including Europe, the Middle East, Southeast Asia, and Hong Kong. His performance of tracks from Me Against Myself on MTV Asia (alongside the Rishi Rich Project) had a television audience as large as 165 million viewers.

== Critical reception and impact ==
Professional ratings
Review scores
Source	Rating
AllMusic	3.5/5 stars
The Guardian	3/5 stars
Liverpool Daily Post	3/4 stars
Yahoo! Music	8/10 stars
Zambia Post	8/10 stars

Me Against Myself was universally acclaimed by critics across the world, particularly for its experimental, creative fusion of contemporary R&B, hip hop music (including old-school and British hip hop) and Indian music (including Bhangra and Bollywood music), as well as its social commentary. In the UK, Dan Gennoe of Yahoo! Music gave the album 8 out of 10 stars, referring to Me Against Myself as "an album of phenomenally accomplished R&B" and "an album of indisputable quality." He praised the Asian musical influence, social commentary, and "well adjusted sense of humour", particularly the "hysterical crisis of integrity" shown in the title track "Me Against Myself" where "rapper Sean mercilessly derides his “pansy” singing alter ego". Antony Hatfield of BBC Music praised the album, stating that it "is of major league significance" and, with "influences that enter from all angles," it is "an album by gifted people with a vision beyond boundaries and a simple devotion to music." In particular, he also praised the title track "Me Against Myself", where Sean's singer and rapper personae go into battle, for its honesty and self-awareness.

Tareck Ghoneim of Contactmusic.com also praised the album, referring to Sean as an "Asian sensation" who is breaking barriers "making pop songs that include sounds from Sean’s cultural background and with potential mass appeal." He stated that the "album is progressive in that it shows a fusion of Asian sounds with r’n’b and pop music." Caroline Sullivan of The Guardian gave the album 3 out of 5 stars, praising "the Bollysoul arrangements that underscore his vocals", in reference to the fusion of Bollywood and soul music, especially in the song "Stolen". The Liverpool Daily Post gave the album a score of 3 out of 4 stars. Peter Culshaw of The Telegraph referred to the album as "highly accomplished R&B, with minor Indian musical elements", but considered the best tracks in the album to be the hip hop tracks "You Don't Know Me" and "Me Against Myself" for their social commentary which deal with Sean's inner conflicts and the difficulties in "trying to make it as an Asian in the hip-hop arena." Culshaw praised Sean's talent and stated that, "currently attracting the attention of demi-god producer Timbaland, it will be fascinating to see how Sean resolves his musical schizophrenia."

The album received similarly positive reviews in Asia, where its British-Asian fusion sounds were also seen as a novelty. In India, A. Vishnu of The Hindu stated that, "After having kick-started the `British sound with an Indian flavour' concept, Sean has created a cutting-edge formula, which appeals to Hip-hop fans and Bhangra enthusiasts alike." He concluded that the "album previews the future of Brit-Bhangra music, which sure is here to stay. It's time to take Bhangra to the next level." The Statesman stated, "A mixture of R & B, hip hop and rap, it has desi flavours as well. With bhangra influences in the background, this album is one of the most popular UK Asian crossover offerings till date." In Malaysia, Kiren Kaur of New Straits Times also praised the album, referring to the songs "Eyes On You" and "Dance With You" in particular as "dance-floor favourites with the fusion of Desi rhythms with R&B tones." In the African country of Zambia, Candice Soobramoney of the Zambia Post gave the album a rating of 8/10.

=== Impact ===
Noted for its experimental, creative fusion of contemporary R&B, British hip hop and Indian music, as well as its social commentary, the album was universally acclaimed by critics and sold more than two million copies worldwide, remaining Sean's most successful album to date. Me Against Myself was influential in pioneering and popularizing Bhangra-R&B fusion music among the worldwide South Asian diaspora. The album helped establish Sean as a major recognized artist across Asia and among the worldwide desi diaspora.

The creativity and experimentalism of his debut album Me Against Myself later became a point of criticism towards Sean's more mainstream follow-up albums, My Own Way (2008) and All or Nothing (2009), for lacking the experimental British-Asian fusion sounds (alongside Rishi Rich) and the social commentary that had characterized his debut album Me Against Myself, in favour of mainstream American-influenced R&B pop music in his later albums. In his review of My Own Way, Angus Batey of The Guardian stated that Sean "has lost - not for ever, one hopes - the stuff that made him stand out" in Me Against Myself. Sean later responded that the reason he gave up on the Indian-R&B fusion music that he helped popularize is because it had eventually become too common in Asian Underground and Indian pop music.

== Track listing ==
Me Against Myself track listing
No.	Title	Producer(s)	Length
1.	"Intro" (Balcony skit)	Jay Sean, Rishi Rich	0:59
2.	"Eyes on You"	Rishi Rich, StarGate	3:11
3.	"One Night"	Rishi Rich	4:08
4.	"Don't Rush"	Rishi Rich	3:49
5.	"On & On"	Peter Biker, Karsten "Delgado" Dahlgaard	3:39
6.	"Stolen"	StarGate, Rishi Rich	4:04
7.	"Come with Me"	Paul Brown, Rishi Rich	4:11
8.	"Holding On"	Rishi Rich	4:37
9.	"Interlude" (Irony skit)	Jay Sean, Mentor	1:01
10.	"Dance with You" (featuring Rishi Rich and Juggy D)	Iceman J, Rishi Rich	2:56
11.	"Man's World (Ramta Jogi)"	Paul Brown, Rishi Rich, A. R. Rahman	3:44
12.	"I Believe in You"	Fitzgerald Scott	3:23
13.	"One Minute"	Jay Sean, Rishi Rich	4:04
14.	"Meri Jaan" (featuring Juggy D)	Rishi Rich	3:11
15.	"Me Against Myself"	Jay Sean, Mentor	3:11
16.	"You Don't Know Me" (hidden track)	Jay Sean, Rishi Rich	3:00
17.	"Who Is Kamaljit" (hidden track)	Jay Sean, Mentor	3:44
Total length:			56:52

== Charts ==
Chart performance for Me Against Myself
Chart (2004)	Peak position
Scottish Albums (Official Charts)	70
UK Albums (Official Charts)	29
UK R&B Albums (Official Charts)	3

== Certifications ==
Certifications for Me Against Myself
Region	Certification	Certified units/sales
United Kingdom (BPI)	Silver	100,000
^{‡} Sales+streaming figures based on certification alone.
