= Tonight (Jay Sean song) =

Single by Jay Sean

from the album My Own Way: Deluxe Edition
- B-side: "I'm Gone" (acoustic version)
- Released: 18 January 2009
- Recorded: 2008
- Genre: R&B; pop
- Length: 3:42 (album version); 3:26 (radio edit)
- Label: Jayded; 2Point9
- Songwriters: Kamaljit Singh; Claude Kelly; Jeremy Skaller; Robert Larow; J Perkins.
- Producers: J-Remy; Bobby Bass

Jay Sean singles chronology
"Stay" (2008)	"Tonight" (2009)	"Down" (2009)

"Tonight" is a single by British R&B singer Jay Sean. The single was released on 18 January 2009 (iTunes) and 26 January 2009 (CD single), but the music video for the single was released several months earlier, on 17 November 2008. The single is the fourth and final single from his second album My Own Way.

== History ==
On 15 October 2008, Jay Sean announced that he had signed with American hip-hop label Cash Money Records, on the back scene at MOBO Awards. Jay explained, "It's always been a dream for me to sign to an American label. And it's great to be accepted by the best in the game".

The single includes a remix featuring rapper Lil Wayne, as Cash Money Records is releasing a remix in order to introduce Jay Sean to the American market. However the remix was canceled, and Sean recorded a new single for the American market called "Down" featuring Lil' Wayne.

My Own Way: Deluxe Edition was released on 16 February 2009 in the UK was set for release in the US, however the idea has been shelved and Jay Sean is working on a new album for the American market. The lead single is "Tonight", which was released on 26 January 2009. The album also has two additional songs, "Never Been in Love" and "I'm Gone", and four additional remixes.

On 21 April 2009, Harj D released a remix for "Tonight", called "Tonight (XS-Bass Remix)". The remix is the first remix after XS-Bass' album Amplified, which was released in 2008.

== Formats and track listings ==
#	Title	Time
Digital CD1: Island
01.	"Tonight" (Josh Harris Remix)	3:39
02.	"Tonight" (Crazy Cousinz Remix)	5:06
03.	"Tonight" (DJ Shadow Dubai Remix)	4:50
Maxi CD/Digital CD2: Island
01.	"Tonight" (Radio Edit)	3:25
02.	"Tonight" (FP Radio Edit)	3:24
03.	"Tonight" (Crazy Cousinz Radio Edit)	3:22
04.	"Tonight" (Punjabi Hit Squad Remix)	4:16
05.	"I'm Gone" (Acoustic Version)	4:08

== Charts ==
=== Weekly charts ===
Weekly chart performance for "Tonight"
Chart (2008–2011)	Peak position
CIS Airplay (TopHit)	44
Russia Airplay (TopHit)	10
Scotland Singles (OCC)	15
UK Singles (OCC)	23

=== Year-end charts ===
2009 year-end chart performance for "Tonight"
Chart (2009)	Position
CIS (Tophit)	169
Hungary (MAHASZ)	98
Russia Airplay (TopHit)	27

2010 year-end chart performance for "Tonight"
Chart (2010)	Position
Russia Airplay (TopHit)	190

2011 year-end chart performance for "Tonight"
Chart (2011)	Position
Russia Airplay (TopHit)	197

=== Decade-end charts ===
Decade-end chart performance for "Tonight"
Chart (2000–2009)	Position
Russia Airplay (TopHit)	150
