= Alan Sampson =

British record producer

Alan Sampson is a British record producer, songwriter and musician. He has written and produced many songs with Jay Sean, including "Ride It," "Maybe, "Far Away" (featuring Keisha Buchanan), and "Stay". He also co-wrote and co-produced "She" and "Drunk" on Zayn's debut studio album, Mind of Mine. Alan is currently signed to BMG UK.

Sampson has also produced music for Alesha Dixon, Parade, Craig David, Idris Elba, and Chasing Abbey.
