= Maybe (Jay Sean song) =

Single by Jay Sean

from the album My Own Way
- B-side: "Ghetto Bruv!"
- Released: 14 April 2008
- Recorded: 2007
- Genre: Pop, R&B
- Label: Jayded, 2Point9
- Songwriters: Jay Sean, Alan Sampson
- Producers: Alan Sampson, J remy & Bobby Bass

Jay Sean singles chronology
"Ride It" (2008)	"Maybe" (2008)	"Stay" (2008)

"Maybe" is the second single from Jay Sean's second album My Own Way. It was originally scheduled to be released on 7 April 2008 but was postponed. The digital download was available on iTunes from 20 April 2008 and for wider release on 20 April 2008, the song physically came out on 28 April 2008.

The song reached the top 20 on the UK Singles Chart, peaking at No. 19 on the week dated 4 May 2008. It was also Sean's most successful song in East Asia, where it reached No. 7 on the Japan Hot 100 Singles chart. It also reached #1 on the Japanese Airplay Charts. A Hindi version sung by Sean was released as part of My Own Way in India. A Mandarin Chinese cover version by Coco Lee has also been released in China.

== Background ==
Speaking in March 2008 to noted UK R&B writer Pete Lewis of the award-winning Blues & Soul, Jay Sean explained how the song first came about: "I'd been listening to some old skool R&B in my car when I first happened to come up with the melody! As soon as it came into my head, I went to the studio. And, once I got in there, I literally told the producer 'Don't speak to me! Let me just hum this melody to you quickly before I forget it!'... And, once I'd started singing, he straightaway began playing some guitar around it. So it was all very organically written, there was no 'Oh, what a cool beat - where's the sample from?'. Instead of being based on production, it was purely about the song, the melody and the lyrics."

== History ==
"Maybe" was originally planned to be released in the United Kingdom on 7 April 2008 followed by the album My Own Way on 14 April 2008. However, for unknown reasons both the single and album release dates were pushed back to 21 April 2008 and 12 May 2008 respectively. Later, a Hindi version of the song was also released on YouTube. It's also known as Shayad.

On 14 August 2009, Coco Lee's Mandarin Chinese album East to west contains a cover versions of Jay Sean's "Maybe", called "Love Right Now". Jay Sean has become #1.

== Formats and track listings ==
#	Title	Time
CD1: Island / 1748515 (UK)
1.	"Maybe" [Radio Edit]	3:26
2.	"Ghetto Bruv!"	3:21
CD2: Island / 1748657 (UK)
1.	"Maybe" (The Beep Beep Song)	3:30
2.	"Maybe (J remy & Bobby Bass Remix)"	3:09
3.	"Maybe (Agent X Edit)"	3:59
4.	"Maybe (Panjabi Hit Squad Remix)"	3:17
5.	"Maybe (Reelsoul Sole Channel Remix)"	4:05
6.	"Maybe (Tigerstyle Remix)"	3:22
7.	"Ghetto Bruv!"	3:21

== Music video ==
On 22 February 2008, the video was exclusively available to watch on YouTube. On 7 March 2008 the music video premiered on the music channel The Box and BBC.

== Charts ==
Chart (2008)	Peak position
European Hot 100 Singles (Billboard)	64
Japan Hot 100 (Billboard)	7
UK Singles (OCC)	19
