= Do You Remember (Jay Sean song) =

2009 single by Jay Sean

Single by Jay Sean featuring Sean Paul and Lil Jon

from the album All or Nothing and The Odyssey Mixtape
- Released: 3 November 2009
- Recorded: December 2008
- Length: 3:30
- Label: Jayded; 2Point9; Cash Money; Universal Republic
- Songwriters: Kamaljit Jhooti; Sean Henriques; Jonathan Smith; Jared Cotter; Frankie Storm; Jeremy Skaller; Robert Larow; Jonathan Perkins
- Producers: J-Remy; Bobby Bass

Jay Sean singles chronology
"Written on Her" (2009)	"Do You Remember" (2009)	"I Made It (Cash Money Heroes)" (2010)

Sean Paul singles chronology
"Hold My Hand" (2009)	"Do You Remember" (2009)	"Got 2 Luv U" (2011)

Lil Jon singles chronology
"Shots" (2009)	"Do You Remember" (2009)	"I Do" (2009)

Music video
- "Do You Remember" on YouTube

"Do You Remember" is the second single from British R&B singer Jay Sean's third studio album All or Nothing. The song features Jamaican dancehall musician Sean Paul and American rapper Lil Jon.

The song was released to U.S. radio stations on 20 October 2009 and released as a digital download on iTunes on 3 November 2009. It is Sean's second single to enter the top ten on the Billboard Hot 100, making him the first male act since Chingy in 2003 to "simultaneously appear in the Hot 100 top 10 with his first two charting singles from a debut release." The single has sold more than a million digital copies in the United States alone. It was later released in the UK on 22 February 2010.

The song was also featured at the start of the 2010 film remake of The Karate Kid.

== Background ==
Speaking in February 2010 to noted UK R&B writer Pete Lewis of the award-winning Blues & Soul, Jay explained the background to the track:

"Basically I'd written this song 'Do You Remember', which I wanted to be a very positive anthem that would spark off nostalgia. Then, when I met Sean Paul at the MTV VMA's, he came up to me saying how he keeps hearing my song 'Down' on the radio and wants to do something together. So, being a big Sean Paul fan, I went back, went through my songs that I'd just recorded... And, when I heard 'Do You Remember', for some reason I could really hear his vibe on it! So I sent it to him, saying 'Listen, I've cut this song which I think you'd be perfect for'... And literally the next day, he sent it back to me with his vocals on it! Then, because we felt we wanted some energy on it, we called up Lil Jon – and that was it! The song was done! Simple as that."

== Composition ==
"Do You Remember" is recorded in the key of B major in common time at a tempo of 126 beats per minute. The song follows a chord progression of B–F♯–C♯m–E, while the vocals span from E_{3} to F♯_{4}. This song is structurally similar to Chris Brown's 2008 song "Forever."

== Variations ==
There are two versions of the song.

- First was recorded with Sean Paul, and was chosen as the radio version.
- The second version is the single and album version with Sean Paul and Lil Jon and was completed in September 2009 where Lil Jon provides additional ad-libs.

== Track listing ==
iTunes digital download

1. "Do You Remember" (featuring Sean Paul & Lil Jon) – 3:31

UK Single CD

1. "Do You Remember" (featuring Sean Paul & Lil Jon) – 3:31
2. "Do You Remember" (Ruff Loaderz Remix)
3. "Do You Remember" (Hitty Remix)

== Official versions ==
- "Do You Remember" (Album Version) (featuring Sean Paul & Lil Jon) – 3:31
- "Do You Remember" (Hitty Remix)
- "Do You Remember" (Ruff Loaderz Remix)

== Music video ==
The video was shot in Los Angeles on 11 November 2009 with Sean Paul and Lil Jon and was directed by Gil Green. It features Sean, Paul and Lil Jon in a New York City block party setting and features cameos from DJ Paul of Three 6 Mafia, Tyga, Birdman and Kevin Rudolf. The lead girl in the video is the model Jessica Vilchis, who plays the role of Jay Sean's love interest in the music video.

The video was also somewhat of a homage to Michael Jackson's "The Way You Make Me Feel" video.

On 3 December 2009, the video premiered on BET. It later had an online world premiere on VEVO on 13 December 2009, and it has nearly 35 million views as of 23 August 2010. As of 2022, the video has over 192 million views.

== Reception ==
DJBooth commented, "like 'Down', this jam has undeniable club/radio appeal – thanks in large part to J remy & Bobby Bass' upbeat, string-led instrumental – which sounds a lot like their boardwork on Down. "Do You Remember" may not be a drastic departure from its predecessor, but Sean's recipe for number-one success yields an equally appetising result the second time around."

"Do You Remember" was the VIP track on UK music channel 4Music on the week commencing 17 January 2010.

== Airplay ==
On 25 January 2010, "Do You Remember" reached a peak of number 1 on the Hot30 Countdown.

== Chart performance ==
In the United States, "Do You Remember" debuted at No. 27 on the Billboard Hot 100 for the chart week of 21 November 2009, making it Sean's highest debut charting single on the Hot 100. On the issue dated 9 January 2010, the song entered the top ten of the Hot 100 at No. 10, thus doubling Sean's presence on the top ten with "Down" also being at No. 7 that same week. On the Pop Songs chart, which measures airplay on U.S. Mainstream pop radio stations, the song peaked at No. 5 for the chart week ending 13 February 2010. On the Canadian Hot 100, it debuted at No. 55 for the chart week of 12 November 2009, so far peaking at No. 11 two months later for the chart week of 23 January 2010.

On the New Zealand Singles Chart, the song debuted at No. 23 on the week ending 30 November 2009, and has so far peaked at No. 11 on the week ending 8 February 2010. Despite the song not being officially released as a single in the United Kingdom until 22 February 2010, the song debuted on the UK Singles Chart at No. 83 and on the UK Indie Chart at No. 6. It has so far peaked at No. 14 on the UK Singles Chart on the week dated 13 February 2010. On the Australian ARIA Charts, the single debuted at No. 43 on the week ending 4 January 2010, when it was the only new entry to enter the Australian Top 50 that week. It went on to peak at No. 7 on the week ending 15 February 2010. The song has also debuted on the European Hot 100 chart, at No. 75, on the chart week dated 6 February 2010, and has so far peaked at No. 39 on the chart week dated 27 February 2010. The song has also reached No. 11 on the Japan Hot 100 on the chart week dated 6 March 2010. That same week on Billboard Japan, it reached No. 10 on the Adult Contemporary chart and No. 8 on the Hot Top Airplay chart.

== Charts ==
=== Weekly charts ===
Chart (2009–2010)	Peak position
Australia (ARIA)	7
Australian Urban Chart	2
Belgium (Ultratop 50 Flanders)	22
Belgium (Ultratip Bubbling Under Wallonia)	12
Canada Hot 100 (Billboard)	11
European Hot 100 Singles (Billboard)	39
France (SNEP)	13
Ireland (IRMA)	23
Japan Hot 100 (Billboard)	11
Netherlands Urban Chart	2
New Zealand (Recorded Music NZ)	11
UK Singles (Official Charts)	13
US Billboard Hot 100	10
US Pop Airplay (Billboard)	5
US Rhythmic Airplay (Billboard)	10

=== Year-end charts ===
Chart (2010)	Position
Australia (ARIA)	62
Canada (Canadian Hot 100)	52
Japan Adult Contemporary (Billboard)	91
US Billboard Hot 100	53
US Mainstream Top 40 (Billboard)	37
US Rhythmic (Billboard)	40

== Certifications ==
Region	Certification	Certified units/sales
Australia (ARIA)	Platinum	70,000^{^}
New Zealand (RMNZ)	2× Platinum	60,000^{‡}
United Kingdom (BPI)	Platinum	600,000^{‡}
United States (RIAA)	2× Platinum	2,000,000^{‡}
^{^} Shipments figures based on certification alone.^{‡} Sales+streaming figures based on certification alone.

== Release history ==
Region	Date	Format	Label
United States	3 November 2009	Digital download	Cash Money Records, Universal Republic
Canada	3 November 2009	Digital download	Cash Money Records, Universal Republic
United Kingdom	22 February 2010	CD single; digital download	Jayded Records; 2Point9 Records
