= Stolen (Jay Sean song) =

2004 single by Jay Sean

Single by Jay Sean

from the album Me Against Myself
- B-side: "Who Is Kamaljit?"
- Released: 25 October 2004
- Length: 4:08
- Label: Relentless; Virgin
- Songwriters: Jay Sean; S.D. Burman; Veronica
- Producers: Rishi Rich; Stargate

Jay Sean singles chronology
| "Eyes on You" (2004) | "Stolen" (2004) | "Ride It" (2008) |

"Stolen" is a song by British singer Jay Sean, released as the third and final single from his debut album, Me Against Myself (2004), on 25 October 2004. The song peaked at number four on the UK Singles Chart, making it Sean's highest-charting UK single until "Down" in 2009, which reached number three. The song contains a sample from the classic Bollywood song "Chura Liya Hai" sung by Asha Bhosle from the 1973 film Yaadon Ki Baaraat.

== Music video ==
Bollywood actress Bipasha Basu makes an appearance in the video.

== Track listings ==
UK CD1

1. "Stolen" (radio edit)
2. "Who Is Kamaljit?"

UK CD2

1. "Stolen" (original full length version)
2. "Stolen" (Syklone remix)
3. "Stolen" (Rishi Rich remix)
4. "Stolen" (video)

UK 12-inch single

A1. "Stolen" (original full length version) – 3:40
A2. "Stolen" (radio edit) – 3:40
B1. "Stolen" (Rishi Rich remix) – 3:48
B2. "Stolen" (Syklone remix) – 3:40

== Charts ==
=== Weekly charts ===
| Chart (2004) | Peak position |
|---|---|
| CIS Airplay (TopHit) | 194 |
| Europe (Eurochart Hot 100) | 14 |
| Scotland Singles (OCC) | 20 |
| UK Singles (OCC) | 4 |
| UK Hip Hop/R&B (OCC) | 2 |

=== Year-end charts ===
| Chart (2004) | Position |
|---|---|
| UK Singles (OCC) | 157 |
