= Dance with You (Nachna Tere Naal) =

Single by Rishi Rich Project featuring Jay Sean and Juggy D

from the album Me Against Myself
- Released: 8 September 2003
- Length: 3:44
- Label: Relentless
- Songwriters: Jay Sean; Juggy D
- Producers: Rishi Rich; Iceman J

Rishi Rich Project singles chronology
"Dance with You (Nachna Tere Naal)" (2003)	"Push It Up (Aaja Kuriye)" (2006)

Jay Sean singles chronology
"Dance with You (Nachna Tere Naal)" (2003)	"Eyes on You" (2004)

"Dance with You (Nachna Tere Naal)" is the debut single of Rishi Rich Project, which consisted of Jay Sean, Juggy D, and Rishi Rich. Produced by Rich, the song was released on 8 September 2003 and peaked at number 12 on the UK Singles Chart. It was later included on Sean's debut album, Me Against Myself (2004), and on Rich's album Rishi Rich Project.

== Background ==
The lyrics are in both English and Punjabi, with Sean singing the English lyrics and Juggy singing the Punjabi lyrics.

== Music video ==
The music video for the song features Sean, Juggy and Rich setting up a block party in a London neighbourhood. In a small scene, the British Asian football freestyler Abbas Farid is also featured juggling with a soccer ball.

== Track listings ==
UK CD and 12-inch single

1. "Dance with You (Nachna Tere Naal)" (original version)
2. "Dance with You (Nachna Tere Naal)" (dancehall Diwali remix)

UK 12-inch single (Wayne Wonder remixes)

A. "Dance with You (Nachna Tere Naal)" (Relentless remix)
B. "Dance with You (Nachna Tere Naal)" (Joe Bongo refix)

== Charts ==
Chart (2003)	Peak position
Scottish Singles Sales (Official Charts)	37
UK Singles (Official Charts)	12
UK Hip Hop/R&B (Official Charts)	5
