= Ride It (Jay Sean song) =

2008 single by Jay Sean

Single by Jay Sean

from the album My Own Way and All or Nothing
- B-side: "Just a Friend"
- Released: 21 January 2008
- Genre: Bhangra; hip hop soul; R&B
- Length: 3:11
- Label: Jayded; 2Point9
- Songwriters: Jay Sean; Alan Sampson
- Producer: Alan Sampson

Jay Sean singles chronology
"Stolen" (2004)	"Ride It" (2008)	"Maybe" (2008)

"Ride It" is a song by British singer-songwriter Jay Sean, released as the first single from his second album, My Own Way. It is also featured on his US debut album, All or Nothing. It was written by Sean himself and Alan Sampson, and produced by the latter. It was released on 21 January 2008. The song reached the top 20 in the UK Singles Chart, peaking at number 11. The single was also very successful and one of the most played songs in Eastern Europe, particularly in Russia, Bulgaria and Romania, where it became one of the top three best-selling singles of the year. A Hindi version of the song was also included in the Indian release of the album My Own Way.

In 2019, a reworked version by Kosovo-Albanian DJ Regard was officially released and became a viral hit on the TikTok app. It reached number one in Ireland, number two on the UK Singles Chart and also peaked at number three in Australia.

== Background ==
"Ride It" was originally planned to be released in the United Kingdom on 5 November 2007 followed by the album My Own Way on 3 December 2007. However, music channels were unwilling to play it at the time and eventually reached an agreement to play it extensively from December onwards. Consequently, Sean pushed back the single's release date as well as the album's release date.

The song, produced by Alan Sampson, became Song of the Week on London's Kiss FM on 10 December 2007 and was also playlisted on Capital FM, Choice FM, Galaxy, BBC Radio 1Xtra, and being featured on BBC Radio 1's B-list. It reached the number one spot on MTV's The Base Chart Show. Later, a Hindi version of the song was added to YouTube.

The intro and the epic melody background was based on the Hero soundtrack by Tan Dun. Some of the scenes in the video were shot in Manhattan.

== Music video ==
The video for the single was shot on 12 August 2007 in the central London nightclub Mo*Vida. On 28 September 2007, the video was exclusively available to watch on 3G mobile handsets and on 9 October 2007 was officially released to the internet by 2Point9 Records. The new video featured Sean with a new style after being out of the limelight for nearly three and a half years.

On 28 September 2007, the video was exclusively available to watch on 3G mobile handsets. A clip of the video was added to the 2Point9 YouTube Channel on 29 September 2007.

By 9 October 2007, the full video was added onto the 2Point9 YouTube Channel. The video premiered on The Box and other music channels in December. It starts off with Sean arriving outside a club, the video is interspersed with a scene of Jay in a dark hallway. He flirts with a woman played by the British Victoria's Secret model, Anara Atanes and then a dance ensues, the video ends with the girl arriving by his side.

== Formats and track listings ==
#	Title	Time
CD1: Island / 1748515 (UK)
1.	"Ride It" (radio edit)	3:09
2.	"Just a Friend"	3:03
CD2: Island / 1748657 (UK)
1.	"Ride It" (radio edit)	3:32
2.	"Ride It" (Desi remix)	4:48
3.	"Ride It" (Sunship remix)	5:51
4.	"Ride It" (Ishi remix)	3:26
5.	"Ride It" (Video plus extras)	3:26

== Charts ==
=== Weekly charts ===
2008–2009 weekly chart performance for "Ride It"
Chart (2008–2009)	Peak position
CIS Airplay (TopHit)	3
CIS Airplay (TopHit) Sunship Remix	186
European Hot 100 Singles (Billboard)	41
Romania (Romanian Top 100)	25
Russia Airplay (TopHit)	3
Russia Airplay (TopHit) Sunship Remix	168
Scottish Singles Sales (Official Charts)	10
Ukraine Airplay (TopHit)	22
UK Singles (Official Charts)	11
UK Hip Hop/R&B (Official Charts)	1

2009–2010 weekly chart performance for "Ride It"
Chart (2009–2010)	Peak position
CIS Airplay (TopHit)	127
Russia Airplay (TopHit)	113

2020 weekly chart performance for "Ride It"
Chart (2020)	Peak position
Hungary (Single Top 40)	27

2025 weekly chart performance for "Ride It"
Chart (2025)	Peak position
Moldova Airplay (TopHit)	77
Romania Airplay (TopHit)	66

=== Monthly charts ===
2008–2009 monthly chart performance for "Ride It"
Chart (2008)	Peak position
CIS Airplay (TopHit)	5
Russia Airplay (TopHit)	2
Ukraine Airplay (TopHit)	37

2025 monthly chart performance for "Ride It"
Chart (2025)	Peak position
Romania Airplay (TopHit)	81

=== Year-end charts ===
2008 year-end chart performance for "Ride It"
Chart (2008)	Position
CIS Airplay (TopHit)	4
Romania (Romanian Top 100)	3
Russia Airplay (TopHit)	3
Ukraine Airplay (TopHit)	84

2009 year-end chart performance for "Ride It"
Chart (2009)	Position
CIS Airplay (TopHit)	197
Ukraine Airplay (TopHit)	115

2023 year-end chart performance for "Ride It"
Chart (2023)	Position
Romania Airplay (TopHit)	179

2024 year-end chart performance for "Ride It"
Chart (2024)	Position
Romania Airplay (TopHit)	145

2025 year-end chart performance for "Ride It"
Chart (2025)	Position
Romania Airplay (TopHit)	129

=== Decade-end charts ===
2000–2009 decade-end chart performance for "Ride It"
Chart (2000–2009)	Position
CIS Airplay (TopHit)	15
Russia Airplay (TopHit)	14
Ukraine Airplay (TopHit)	114

2020–2024 decade-end chart performance for "Ride It"
Chart (2020–2024)	Position
Romania Airplay (TopHit)	193

== Certifications ==
Region	Certification	Certified units/sales
United Kingdom (BPI)	Gold	400,000^{‡}
^{‡} Sales+streaming figures based on certification alone.

== Regard remix ==
"Ride It"

Single by Regard
- Released: 26 July 2019
- Length: 2:38
- Label: Ministry of Sound
- Songwriters: Jay Sean; Alan Sampson
- Producer: Regard

Regard singles chronology
"Ride It" (2019)	"Secrets" (2020)

Music video
- "Ride It" on YouTube

Kosovo-Albanian DJ Regard officially released a reworked version of the song on 26 July 2019, though earlier versions of the song were available as early as 2017. It became a viral sensation on the TikTok app shortly after release, with over four million clips being posted by people using snippets of the song on the app. Due to the sudden success of the song, Regard subsequently signed to the label Ministry of Sound. The song was a global success, reaching number one in Ireland and Mexico, number two in the UK and peaked within the top 20 in various other European and Oceanian countries. It was certified triple platinum by the BPI. As of 26 August 2023, the track has received over 1.22 billion streams on Spotify.

Neither Regard nor Sean appear in the music video, directed by Meji Alabi. The music video was shot in Ukraine; its cast includes English dancer and actor Harry Parr, and the vehicle used also features in the music video for Rosa Linn's 2022 viral hit "Snap".

=== Live performances ===
Regard performed the song with Sean at the 2019 Jingle Bell Ball held by Capital FM at The O2 Arena in London on 7 December 2019.

=== Charts ===
==== Weekly charts ====
2019–2023 weekly chart performance for "Ride It"
Chart (2019–2023)	Peak position
Australia (ARIA)	3
Australia Dance (ARIA)	1
Austria (Ö3 Austria Top 40)	5
Belarus Airplay (TopHit)	99
Belgium (Ultratop 50 Flanders)	2
Belgium (Ultratop 50 Wallonia)	3
Bulgaria Airplay (PROPHON)	3
Canada Hot 100 (Billboard)	29
Canada AC (Billboard)	38
Canada CHR/Top 40 (Billboard)	25
Canada Hot AC (Billboard)	34
CIS Airplay (TopHit)	4
Colombia Airplay (National-Report)	95
Croatia International Airplay (Top lista)	2
Czech Republic Airplay (ČNS IFPI)	1
Czech Republic Singles Digital (ČNS IFPI)	8
Denmark (Tracklisten)	6
Finland (Suomen virallinen lista)	6
France (SNEP)	13
Germany (GfK)	4
Germany Airplay (BVMI)	1
Global 200 (Billboard)	86
Greece International Streaming (IFPI)	9
Hungary (Dance Top 40)	2
Hungary (Rádiós Top 40)	2
Hungary (Single Top 40)	3
Hungary (Stream Top 40)	9
Ireland (IRMA)	1
Italy (FIMI)	50
Latvia Streaming (LaIPA)	5
Lithuania (AGATA)	7
Luxembourg (Billboard)	2
Mexico Airplay (Billboard)	6
Mexico Ingles Airplay (Billboard)	1
Moldova Airplay (TopHit)	1
Netherlands (Dutch Top 40)	6
Netherlands (Single Top 100)	9
New Zealand (Recorded Music NZ)	8
Norway (VG-lista)	23
Poland Airplay (ZPAV)	2
Portugal (AFP)	52
Romania (Airplay 100)	16
Romania Airplay (Media Forest)	3
Russia Airplay (TopHit)	3
Scottish Singles Sales (Official Charts)	2
Slovakia Airplay (ČNS IFPI)	1
Slovakia Singles Digital (ČNS IFPI)	6
Slovenia Airplay (SloTop50)	2
Spain (PROMUSICAE)	94
Sweden (Sverigetopplistan)	25
Switzerland (Schweizer Hitparade)	2
Ukraine Airplay (TopHit)	38
UK Singles (Official Charts)	2
UK Dance (Official Charts)	1
US Billboard Hot 100	62
US Hot Dance/Electronic Songs (Billboard)	3
US Pop Airplay (Billboard)	17

==== Monthly charts ====
2019–2020 monthly chart performance for "Ride It"
Chart (2019–2020)	Peak position
CIS Airplay (TopHit)	5
Czech Republic (Rádio Top 100)	1
Czech Republic (Singles Digitál Top 100)	9
Latvia Airplay (LaIPA)	1
Russia Airplay (TopHit)	4
Slovakia (Rádio Top 100)	1
Slovakia (Singles Digitál Top 100)	8

2023 monthly chart performance for "Ride It"
Chart (2023)	Peak position
Lithuania Airplay (TopHit)	95
Moldova Airplay (TopHit)	1
Ukraine Airplay (TopHit)	41

==== Year-end charts ====
2019 year-end chart performance for "Ride It"
Chart (2019)	Position
Australia (ARIA)	49
Belgium (Ultratop Flanders)	51
Denmark (Tracklisten)	56
CIS Airplay (TopHit)	75
France (SNEP)	165
Germany (Official German Charts)	74
Hungary (Single Top 40)	96
Ireland (IRMA)	31
Latvia Streaming (LaIPA)	61
Netherlands (Dutch Top 40)	71
Netherlands (Single Top 100)	96
Poland (ZPAV)	68
Russia Airplay (TopHit)	70
Switzerland (Schweizer Hitparade)	63
UK Singles (OCC)	38
US Hot Dance/Electronic Songs (Billboard)	22

2020 year-end chart performance for "Ride It"
Chart (2020)	Position
Australia (ARIA)	18
Austria (Ö3 Austria Top 40)	15
Belgium (Ultratop Flanders)	9
Belgium (Ultratop Wallonia)	10
Canada (Canadian Hot 100)	42
CIS Airplay (TopHit)	28
Denmark (Tracklisten)	42
France (SNEP)	21
Germany (Official German Charts)	9
Hungary (Dance Top 40)	13
Hungary (Rádiós Top 40)	4
Hungary (Single Top 40)	7
Hungary (Stream Top 40)	8
Ireland (IRMA)	37
Italy (FIMI)	64
Netherlands (Dutch Top 40)	43
Netherlands (Single Top 100)	27
New Zealand (Recorded Music NZ)	31
Poland (ZPAV)	80
Romania (Airplay 100)	69
Russia Airplay (TopHit)	25
Switzerland (Schweizer Hitparade)	8
UK Singles (OCC)	38
US Hot Dance/Electronic Songs (Billboard)	7

2021 year-end chart performance for "Ride It"
Chart (2021)	Position
Australia (ARIA)	90
CIS Airplay (TopHit)	87
France (SNEP)	102
Global 200 (Billboard)	106
Hungary (Rádiós Top 40)	55
Portugal (AFP)	141
Russia Airplay (TopHit)	107
Switzerland (Schweizer Hitparade)	65

2022 year-end chart performance for "Ride It"
Chart (2022)	Position
CIS Airplay (TopHit)	178

2023 year-end chart performance for "Ride It"
Chart (2023)	Position
Moldova Airplay (TopHit)	21
Romania Airplay (TopHit)	181
Ukraine Airplay (TopHit)	74

2025 year-end chart performance for "Ride It"
Chart (2025)	Position
Belarus Airplay (TopHit)	186
Hungary (Rádiós Top 40)	71

==== Decade-end charts ====
2020–2024 decade-end chart performance for "Ride It"
Chart (2020–2024)	Position
CIS Airplay (TopHit)	53
Belarus Airplay (TopHit)	43
Romania Airplay (TopHit)	138
Russia Airplay (TopHit)	97
Ukraine Airplay (TopHit)	157

=== Certifications ===
Region	Certification	Certified units/sales
Australia (ARIA)	7× Platinum	490,000^{‡}
Austria (IFPI Austria)	3× Platinum	90,000^{‡}
Belgium (BRMA)	2× Platinum	80,000^{‡}
Canada (Music Canada)	7× Platinum	560,000^{‡}
Denmark (IFPI Danmark)	3× Platinum	270,000^{‡}
France (SNEP)	Diamond	333,333^{‡}
Germany (BVMI)	2× Platinum	800,000^{‡}
Italy (FIMI)	3× Platinum	210,000^{‡}
Mexico (AMPROFON)	Diamond+2× Platinum	420,000^{‡}
New Zealand (RMNZ)	5× Platinum	150,000^{‡}
Poland (ZPAV)	Diamond	100,000^{‡}
Portugal (AFP)	2× Platinum	20,000^{‡}
Spain (Promusicae)	2× Platinum	120,000^{‡}
Switzerland (IFPI Switzerland)	2× Platinum	40,000^{‡}
United Kingdom (BPI)	3× Platinum	1,800,000^{‡}
United States (RIAA)	Platinum	1,000,000^{‡}
Streaming
Greece (IFPI Greece)	2× Platinum	4,000,000^{†}
^{‡} Sales+streaming figures based on certification alone.^{†} Streaming-only figures based on certification alone.
