= Jay Sean =

British singer (born 1981)

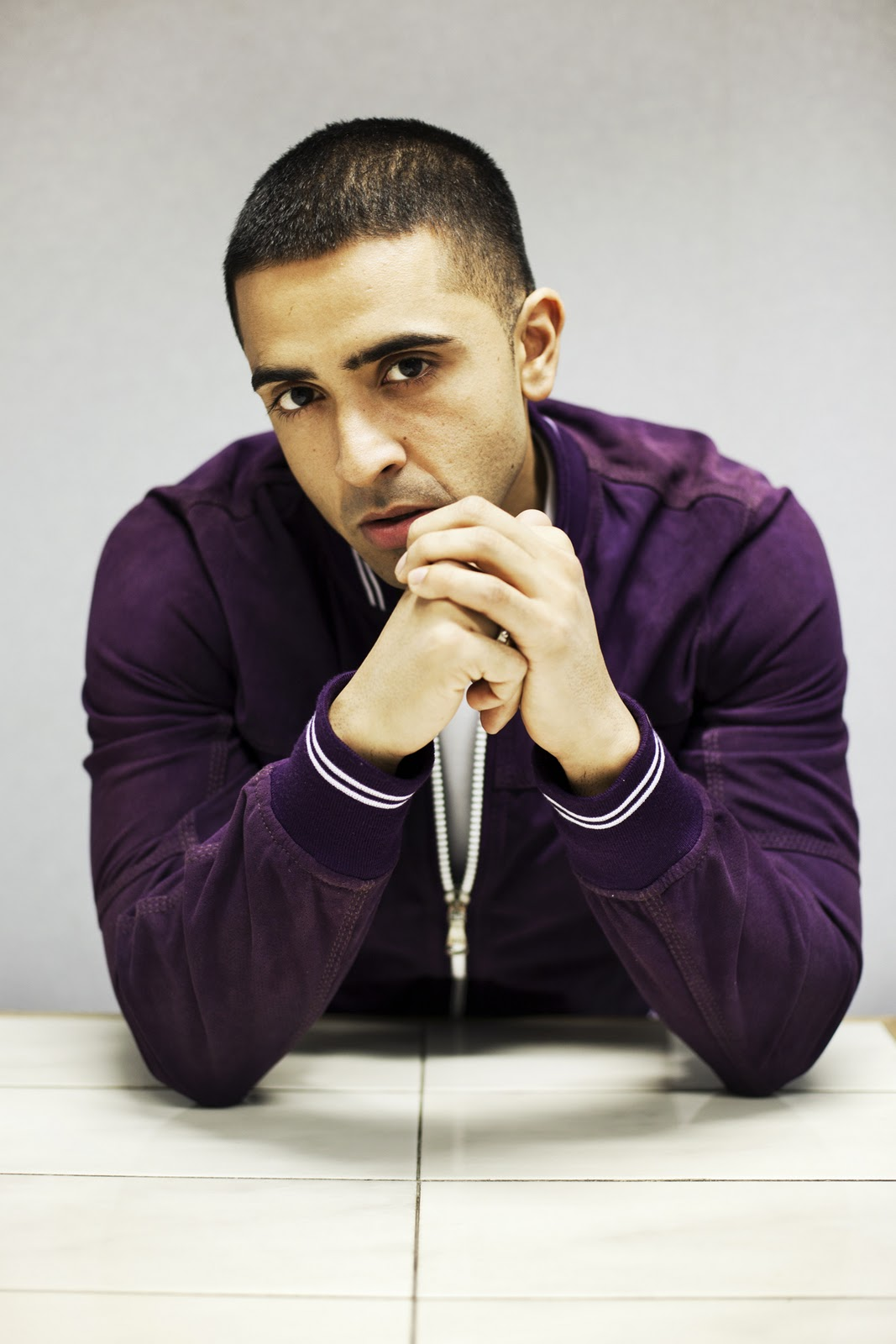
- Sean in 2011
- Born: Kamaljit Singh Jhooti; 26 March 1981 (age 45); London, England
- Other name: MC Nicky J
- Education: Latymer Upper School
- Alma mater: Barts and The London School of Medicine and Dentistry; Queen Mary University of London
- Occupations: Singer; songwriter; record producer; arranger
- Years active: 2002–present
- Spouse: Thara Prashad (m. 2009)
- Children: 2
- Awards: Full list
- Musical career
- Genres: R&B; pop; hip hop; bhangra; British soul
- Instrument: Vocals
- Labels: Jayded; Universal Republic; Universal Motown; Cash Money; 2Point9; Motown; Republic; Def Jam; Virgin
- Formerly of: The Rishi Rich Project
- Website: jaysean.com

Kamaljit Singh Jhooti (born 26 March 1981), known professionally as Jay Sean, is a British singer and songwriter. He debuted in the UK's Asian Underground scene as a member of the Rishi Rich Project with "Dance with You", which reached No. 12 on the UK Singles Chart in 2003. This led to him being signed to Virgin Records and having two UK top 10 hits as a solo artist in 2004: "Eyes on You" at No. 6 and "Stolen" at No. 4. They were included in his critically acclaimed debut album Me Against Myself which, though only moderately successful in the UK, sold more than two million copies across Asia and remains his most successful album to date. Alongside the Rishi Rich Project, Sean was a pioneer of Bhangra-R&B fusion, which his debut album helped popularize among the worldwide South Asian diaspora.

He parted ways with Virgin in 2006 and founded his own label, Jayded Records. After a gap of nearly four years, he returned in 2008 with "Ride It", which peaked at number 11 on the UK singles chart. It was followed by hits such as "Maybe", which peaked at number 7 on the Japan Hot 100, and "Tonight". All three songs were included in his second album, My Own Way (2008). A critical and commercial success, it peaked at number 6 in the UK Albums Chart and topped the UK R&B Chart. At around this time, he began incorporating electropop sounds into his R&B music.

From 2008 up to 2014, he was signed to Cash Money Records. His 2009 single, "Down" (featuring Lil Wayne), topped the Billboard Hot 100, making him the first solo artist of South Asian origin and first UK urban act to top the Hot 100. It was the seventh-best selling song of 2009, having sold more than three million copies in the United States that year, eventually reaching six million sales in the United States, making him the most successful British/European male urban artist in US chart history at the time. As of 2011, it is the fifth best selling song by a British artist in the digital era. Its success was matched with his followed-up hit, "Do You Remember" (featuring Lil Jon and Sean Paul), which has sold more than a million copies in the US, and entered the top ten on the Hot 100, making him the first male act since Chingy in 2003 to "simultaneously appear in the Hot 100 top 10 with his first two charting singles." They were included in his American-debut album All or Nothing, which debuted at No. 37 on the US Billboard 200 and reached No. 11 on the Japan Oricon Albums Chart. Sean has also been a featured artist on several hits including "What Happened to Us" by Australian singer Jessica Mauboy, which charted within the top 20 on the ARIA singles chart and certified platinum by the Australian Recording Industry Association. Sean was ranked No. 35 in Billboard's Hot 100 Artists of 2009.

== Life and career ==
=== Early life and career beginnings ===
Jay Sean was born as Kamaljit Singh Jhooti on 26 March 1981 in Hounslow, West London into an Indian Punjabi Sikh family to parents Sharan Singh Jhooti and Bindi Kaur Jhooti. He was raised in Southall, West London and displayed musical talent at an early age. At age 11, he and his cousin Pritpal Rupra formed a hip hop duo named "Compulsive Disorder". His stage name at the time was MC "Nicky J", with the "J" being derived from the first letter of his last name "Jhooti". He eventually came to be known by the nickname "Jay" among his friends.

He was a student at Latymer Upper School and left the school in 1997. He finished his GCSEs as a "straight-A student" and then completed his A Levels with an A grade in Biology and B grades in Mathematics and Chemistry. He later enrolled in Barts and The London School of Medicine and Dentistry at Queen Mary University of London, to study Medicine before he dropped out in 2003 to pursue a singing career. For his music career, he chose the stage name Jay Sean; "Jay" being his nickname, while "Sean" is derived from "Shaan"—a nickname he was called at home by his grandmother—which means "shining star" or "pride" in the Punjabi language.

=== 2003–2006: Me Against Myself with Relentless Records ===
After Sean's track "One Minute" fell into the hands of producer Rishi Rich, the Rishi Rich Project was formed (consisting of Rich, Sean and Juggy D) in 2003. Their first taste of UK chart success was the Asian underground song, "Dance with You (Nachna Tere Naal)", which became a Top 20 hit, peaking at No. 12. This led to Sean signing a £1m deal with Virgin Records, under their label Relentless Records. His second single, "Eyes on You", was his first solo effort and became a Top 10 hit, peaking at No. 6. His third single, "Stolen", peaked at No. 4, with Bollywood actress Bipasha Basu making an appearance in the video. His debut album, Me Against Myself, was released in 2004 and received much critical praise and acclaim. Sean was referred to as an "Asian sensation" and was praised for his experimental, creative fusion of contemporary R&B, British hip hop and Indian music. The title track in particular was considered innovative, featuring two alter egos of himself, one an R&B singer and the other a rapper, clashing in a rap battle.

Despite initially failing to reach the top 20 on the UK Albums Chart (where it peaked at No. 29), the album gradually managed to sell 100,000 copies in the UK and went on to become a substantial hit in India, selling over two million copies there. He made a brief appearance in the 2005 Bollywood film Kyaa Kool Hai Hum, providing the song "Dil Mera (My Heart)" to the soundtrack, based on "One Night" from his own debut album. Beyond India, the album sold over 300,000 copies across other parts of the world, including Europe, the Middle East, Southeast Asia, and Hong Kong. His performance of tracks from Me Against Myself on MTV Asia (alongside the Rishi Rich Project) had a television audience as large as 165 million viewers. It helped establish Sean as a major recognised artist across Asia and among the worldwide Desi diaspora, and remains his most successful album to date. With his debut album, Sean was influential in popularising Indian-R&B fusion sounds in Asian underground and Indian pop music. He recorded a 16 track album which was scrapped because Virgin felt the market had changed to where it was all about Pop music. In February 2006, after several delays of his second album, he left Virgin Records.

=== 2007–2009: My Own Way and All or Nothing ===
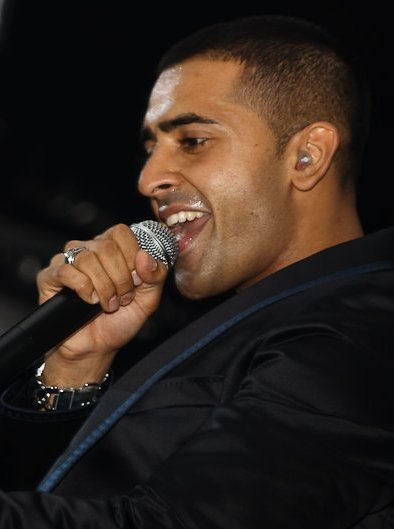
Sean performing

After parting ways with Virgin Records, Sean continued to work on his second album, which was initially named after the title track "Deal With It", but the song ended up being given to Corbin Bleu. Sean's background vocals remain on Bleu's version of the track. The song "Deal With It" earned Sean a BMI Songwriter Award and later inspired the 2009 single "Juliette" by South Korean band Shinee.

Sean returned in late 2007 with the new single "Ride It", which was the first single from his second album My Own Way. It was to be the first album released as a joint-venture between his own label Jayded and 2Point9 Records. The video for "Ride It", released in early 2008, featured Sean with a new style after being out of the limelight for nearly three and a half years. My Own Way debuted at No. 6 in the official UK Albums Chart and generated two more UK top 20 singles, "Ride It" and "Maybe". On the back of this Sean received two MOBO Award nominations, for Best UK Male (alongside Dizzee Rascal, Taio Cruz, Wiley and Sway) and Best R'n'B/Soul (alongside Usher, Estelle, Ne-Yo and Chris Brown). "Ride It" was successful in Eastern Europe, especially in Russia, Turkey and Romania, where it became one of the three best-selling singles of the year. The song was remixed by Kosovan DJ Regard in 2019 and became a viral hit on the TikTok app. "Maybe" was his most successful single in Japan, where it reached No. 7 on the Japan Hot 100 Singles. A Mandarin Chinese cover version of "Maybe" by Coco Lee has been released in China. Sean sang a Hindi version of the album My Own Way for release in India. The album sold more than 350,000 copies across the world.

Touch Magazine in the UK described him as "the UK's answer to Ne-Yo," while The Independent called him "...an urban legend in the making." In August 2008, Sean co-hosted London radio station Choice FM's Breakfast show a week in which he only performed previously unheard tracks, including a song whose title was left to the listeners to decide. The unknown track was later confirmed to be called "Tonight" and is included in My Own Way: Deluxe Edition. Sean was confirmed for the third series of Celebrity Scissorhands in October 2008 but he withdrew before the show was aired for unclear reasons.

On 15 October 2008 during the MOBO Awards, Sean announced that he had signed with the American hip-hop oriented record label Cash Money Records distributed via Universal Republic Records making him the first male British Asian singer to sign with an American label. His American-debut single was "Down" featuring American rapper and label mate Lil Wayne. It topped the Billboard Hot 100, replacing The Black Eyed Peas. This made him the first British artist to top the Hot 100 since Freddie Mercury of Queen in 1980, and the first solo artist of Asian descent to do so. "Down" has sold more than six million copies in the United States, and three million digital copies in the US, making the song the best-selling single by a British/European male artist in North America since Elton John's "Candle in the Wind" in 1997. In addition, "Down" has received a large airplay of two billion listener impressions on radio worldwide. As of November 2011, "Down" has sold 4.1 million copies in the US, which is currently the fifth best-selling song by a British artist in the digital era. In November 2009, Sean's next single from his album, "Do You Remember", was released and featured Jamaican dancehall superstar Sean Paul plus US Southern crunk rapper Lil Jon. It entered the Hot 100 top ten on the week of 9 January 2009, breaking "a three-week streak of no titles moving into the top 10" since December 2009. Like its predecessor, it has sold more than a million copies in the United States.

At the 2009 UK Asian Music Awards (AMA), Sean won three awards, including "Best Male", "Best Urban Act" and "Best Album", the latter for his second album, My Own Way. He met with Rishi Rich, Juggy D and H-Dhami during the ceremony. After the award, he was in America for the first time since signing with Cash Money, he announced through an interview with MTV IGGY that he was recording five new songs for his album, then titled My Own Way (U.S. edition), one of which was his American-debut single with Lil Wayne, later titled "Down". Sean discussed a collaboration with Akon at the 2009 Grammy Awards, in addition to recording a song with Nadine Coyle and told viewers that the album will be released in third quarter of 2009. The album title was later changed to All or Nothing, and featured brand new songs and some of the songs from My Own Way. Despite success with two singles from the album, the album itself only debuted at No. 37 on the US Billboard 200. It was his lowest-charting entry on the UK Albums Chart, debuting there at No. 62. Despite this, it has become his highest-charting album in Japan, reaching No. 11 on the Oricon Albums Chart.

Sean was featured on a song called "Written on Her" alongside Birdman for the CEO's project, released on 23 June 2009 on iTunes. Sean has featured on Skepta's single "Lush" released on 10 June 2009 on iTunes. On 2 February 2010, Kevin Rudolf's single "I Made It (Cash Money Heroes)", featured Sean alongside Birdman and Lil Wayne, was released. In early December 2009, it was confirmed that he has collaborated with Justin Timberlake and Esmée Denters on a song, "Love Dealer". There have been talks of collaborations with other American artists such as Ashley Tisdale, Taylor Swift, Nicole Scherzinger, Rihanna, Usher, and Jay-Z & Beyoncé.

Sean was in early September 2009 nominated for the 30 Under 30 award. At the 2009 UK Urban Music Awards, he won the Best Collaboration award for "Down" alongside Lil Wayne. In early December 2009, he was ranked No. 35 in Billboard's Hot 100 Artists of the year. On 11 December 2009, he became the first South Asian origin artist since Freddie Mercury to perform at Madison Square Garden, as part of the Jingle Ball concert, alongside beatboxer MC Zani. Sean's performance "had the entire crowd – parents and children, teens and twenty-somethings – dancing."

=== 2010–2013: Neon and The Mistress ===
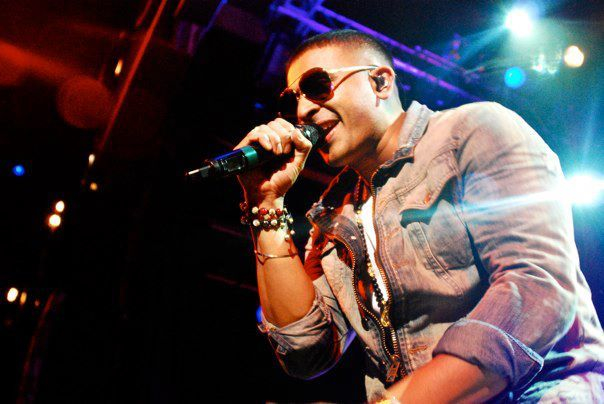
Sean in 2011

Sean began working on his fourth album and second with Cash Money Records, Freeze Time in July 2010. At the time, he stated that he had completed roughly 75 percent of the album and that guests included Lil Wayne, Pitbull, Nicki Minaj and Mary J. Blige. Three singles, "2012 (It Ain't the End)", "Hit The Lights" and "Like This, Like That" were released in support of the album. Sean also co-headlined with Joe Jonas on the Joe Jonas & Jay Sean Tour with JoJo as the opening act. Sean released a mixtape titled The Mistress in September 2011, spawning a single and a music video for "Where Do We Go".

Freeze Time was scrapped due to legal issues in 2011 and Sean began working on a new, be more R&B influenced album altogether. The first official single from the album was announced to be "I'm All Yours", which features American and Latin artist Pitbull. Officially released in May 2012, the song peaked at No. 85 on the Billboard Hot 100. The song's best performance was in Australia where it peaked at 13 and was certified as Gold. The second single of the album "So High", produced by DJ Afrojack, was released in October 2012. Later in the same month, both singles were included in an EP, titled So High, with "Sex 101" featuring Cash Money rapper Tyga (originally included in The Mistress) and an exclusive bonus track "Patience".

In February 2013, Sean announced he would be changing the title of the album from Worth It all to Neon, and his long delayed fourth studio album was released in July 2013. Both of the album singles, "Where You Are" and "Mars" featuring American rapper Rick Ross, failed to break into the Billboard Hot 100.

=== 2014–present: The Mistress II: The Room Service and Collaborations with DJs ===
In January 2014, Sean released the lead song "Take That Off" from his second mixtape The Mistress II. Alongside releasing the first single in October 2014, "Tears in the Ocean" which received acclaimed reviews from audiences, Sean left Cash Money Records, citing that he wanted to go in a different direction artistically. On 14 November 2014, music website Djbooth premiered the second single "All I Want". The Mistress II was released on 18 November with a video for "All I Want" premiered hours later. A video for the third single "Jameson" was released on 23 December, and it was announced that an EP of The Mistress II featuring the original and acoustic remixed versions of each of the third singles from the mixtape would be released on 26 December.

In 2015, Sean reunited with fellow UK artists Rishi Rich and Juggy D, restart the Rishi Rich project, together, they released the single: "Freak".

On 5 February 2016, Sean released his first 'official' single since his departure from Cash Money Records, title Make My Love Go, the single featuring Sean Paul who also featured in Sean's 2010 single Do You Remember, the single marked Sean's first appearance on charts since the 2012 single I'm All Yours. Sean also collaborated with various well-known DJs: DJ Antoine, Hardwell, DJ Prostyle, Alex Gaudino, as well as artists Christian Rich, Stafford Brothers and Seeb. The single "Thinking About You" with Hardwell received favourable and positive reviews from critics and audiences.

In 2017, Sean released the singles "Do You Love Me" and "What You Want" featuring Davido. He followed these in 2018 with the singles "Emergency" and "Say Something".

In February 2018, Sean check for the final draft of The Mistress III.

Towards the end of 2018, Sean released four songs: "Need To Know", "Now Or Later", "Say Something" and "Why Why How Why".

In 2020, Sean collaborated with Indian pop singer Guru Randhawa and released the single "Surma Surma". Also, along with Rishi Rich, Sean released a single "Nakhre", also titled as "Eyes on You 2" which reached No.1 on BBC Asian Chart.

He began 3AM Entertainment to help promote the next generation of South Asian artists.

== Community work ==
Sean has worked with BBC Blast doing Q&A's on tour events in an effort to "give something back". He has supported the Aga Khan Foundation (AKF) in the charity event Partnership Walk and Run by performing in Regent's Park in 2004 and 2009. During this time, he also visited different UK schools to inspire and encourage schoolchildren to get involved in music; at one school, he met a young Zayn Malik and encouraged him to sing on stage for the first time.

In 2009, Sean performed in Justin Timberlake's charity concert to raise funds for the Shriners Hospital for Children, alongside artists such as MC Zani, Taylor Swift and Alicia Keys. It became one of the highest-earning charity events of the year, raising more than $9 million.

In 2012, Sean became a part of Child Hunger Ends Here campaign along with artists Owl City and Jewel. For this purpose he recorded a song named "Here's Hope" which was available from the Child Hunger Ends Here website. He also appeared in a PETA ad campaign, encouraging potential pet owners to adopt from shelters rather than buy from stores.

== Personal life ==
Sean married singer Thara in August 2009. Their daughter, Ayva Loveen Kaur Jhooti, was born on 13 December 2013. They had a son named Aaryan on 15 August 2018.

== Discography ==
- Me Against Myself (2004)
- My Own Way (2008)
- All or Nothing (2009)
- Neon (2013)

== Awards and nominations ==
30 Under 30

- 2009: Nominated (Won)

UK Asian Music Awards (AMAs)

- 2005
  - Best Album (Me Against Myself) (Won)
  - Best Urban Act (Won)
  - Best Video ("Stolen") (Won)
- 2007
  - DesiHits Artist of the Year Award (Won)
- 2008
  - Best Urban Act (Won)
  - Best Video ("Ride It") (Won)
- 2009
  - Best Male Act (Won)
  - Best Album (My Own Way) (Won)
  - Best Urban Act (Won)
- 2010
  - Best Male Act (Won)
  - Best Urban Act (Won)
  - Best Video ("Down") (Won)
  - Best Album (All or Nothing) (Won)
- 2011
  - Best Male Act (Won)
  - Best Urban Act (Nominated)
  - Best Video - ft. Nicki Minaj – "2012 (It Ain't the End)" (Won)

Brit Asia TV Music Awards

- 2010
  - Best UK Urban Act (Won)
  - Best Single ("Down") (Won)
  - Best Male (Nominated)
  - Best Album (All or Nothing) (Nominated)

UK BMI Awards

- 2008: BMI Songwriter Awards ("Deal With It") (Won)

Channel U Best of British Awards

- 2008: Best Video ("Ride It") (Won)

MOBO Awards

- 2008
  - Best UK Male (Nominated)
  - Best R'n'B/Soul (Nominated)

MTV Russia Music Awards

- 2008: Best International Artist (Won)

Rogers Filmi South Asian Film Festival

- 2009: Music Video Award ("Down") (Won)

UK Urban Music Awards

- 2009: Best Collaboration ("Down", featuring Lil Wayne) (Won)

== Concert tours ==
- Joe Jonas & Jay Sean Tour (2011)
- Asia Tour (2018)

== Filmography ==
- Kyaa Kool Hai Hum (2005), himself
- Sesame Street (2011), 1 episode

== See also ==
- List of songs written by Jay Sean
