= 2Point9 Records =

English record label

- Founded: 2003
- Founder: Billy Grant, Rob Stuart
- Status: 2003–2009; 2020–present
- Distributor(s): Amoon Justin & Absolute Marketing
- Genre: R&B, hip hop, bhangra, pop
- Country of origin: United Kingdom
- Location: London, England
- Official website: www.2point9.com

2Point9 Records (DohPointNau) is an independent record label, a subsidiary of an all-in-one entertainment company called 2Point9, that was started in 2003 when Telstar Records A&R manager Billy Grant and Promotions manager Rob Stuart decided to leave the company to set up their own little independent runnings.

== History ==
Credited with breaking Jay Sean, Craig David and Mis-Teeq among others to mainstream audiences, Billy Grant and Rob Stuart gained a reputation for being able to create effective strategies for exposing so called "niche" markets to a mainstream audience.

After leaving Telstar Records in 2003, they formed 2Point9 combining management, record label, music publishing, live agency and consultancy. It quickly established itself as the No. 1 record label for contemporary South Asian-Western crossover music not only in the UK but worldwide. Signing producer Rishi Rich and artists Jay Sean, Juggy D, Mumzy Stranger and Mentor, 2Point9 quickly developed a sound which was to represent the new generation of young western South Asian youth. Ricky Martin and Britney Spears were just two of the international artists who benefited from the 2Point9 sound.

2Point9's first signing, Jay Sean went on to sell over 300,000 copies of his debut album Me Against Myself, going multi-platinum in India, a territory where 2Point9 have enjoyed huge success. As a result, he became the leading icon for South Asian youth around the world.

Getting involved in movies and commercials, 2Point9 also produced tracks for TV ads for a number of brands including McDonald's and Sharwood's. They also were responsible for a number of Bollywood smashes including the title track for Hum Tum - one of the biggest Bollywood movies. Jay Sean’s track "Ride It" was featured in the western movie Fish Tank which got rave reviews at the 2009 Cannes Film Festival.

2Point9 has toured in over 100 cities across four continents including the Middle East, Australia, NZ, Hong Kong, USA, Canada, South East Asia, Kenya and all over Europe. They utilize the internet as a key promotional tool, finding innovative ways to reach new audiences across the globe.

2Point9 also placed and then produced a weekly show on London radio station Kiss FM for three years with Jay Sean being one of the main presenters. The 2Point9 coordinator for the show, Neev, going on to gain a daytime radio slot on the station.

More recently, 2Point9 decided to focus solely for a couple of years on developing the career of Jay Sean. They independently released Jay Sean's second album My Own Way on the Jayded record label (a joint venture between 2Point9 founders Billy Grant and Rob Stuart and Jay Sean himself). The album peaked at Number 6 in the UK album chart and has sold close on 100,000 physical units and in excess of 250,000 mobile and MP3 computer downloads worldwide across all formats. It was the No. 2 album for 6 weeks in UAE behind Coldplay and the singles "Ride It" and "Maybe" were No. 1 airplay records in places as far afield as Russia, Poland, UAE and Japan.

== 2Point9 Publishing Ltd ==
"2Point9" also runs a publishing company (TwoPointNine Publishing Ltd) and an artist booking agency which sources gigs for 2Point9 artists and other artists worldwide. The label is best known for the Rishi Rich Project, an Asian Underground group founded by producer Rishi Rich, and British Asian artists formerly associated with it, particularly Jay Sean and Juggy D.

== Artists ==
2Point9's includes:

- Jernade Miah
- Jay Sean
- Juggy D
- Mentor Kolektiv
- Rishi Rich
- Veronica Mehta
