= UpsideDown (DJ) =

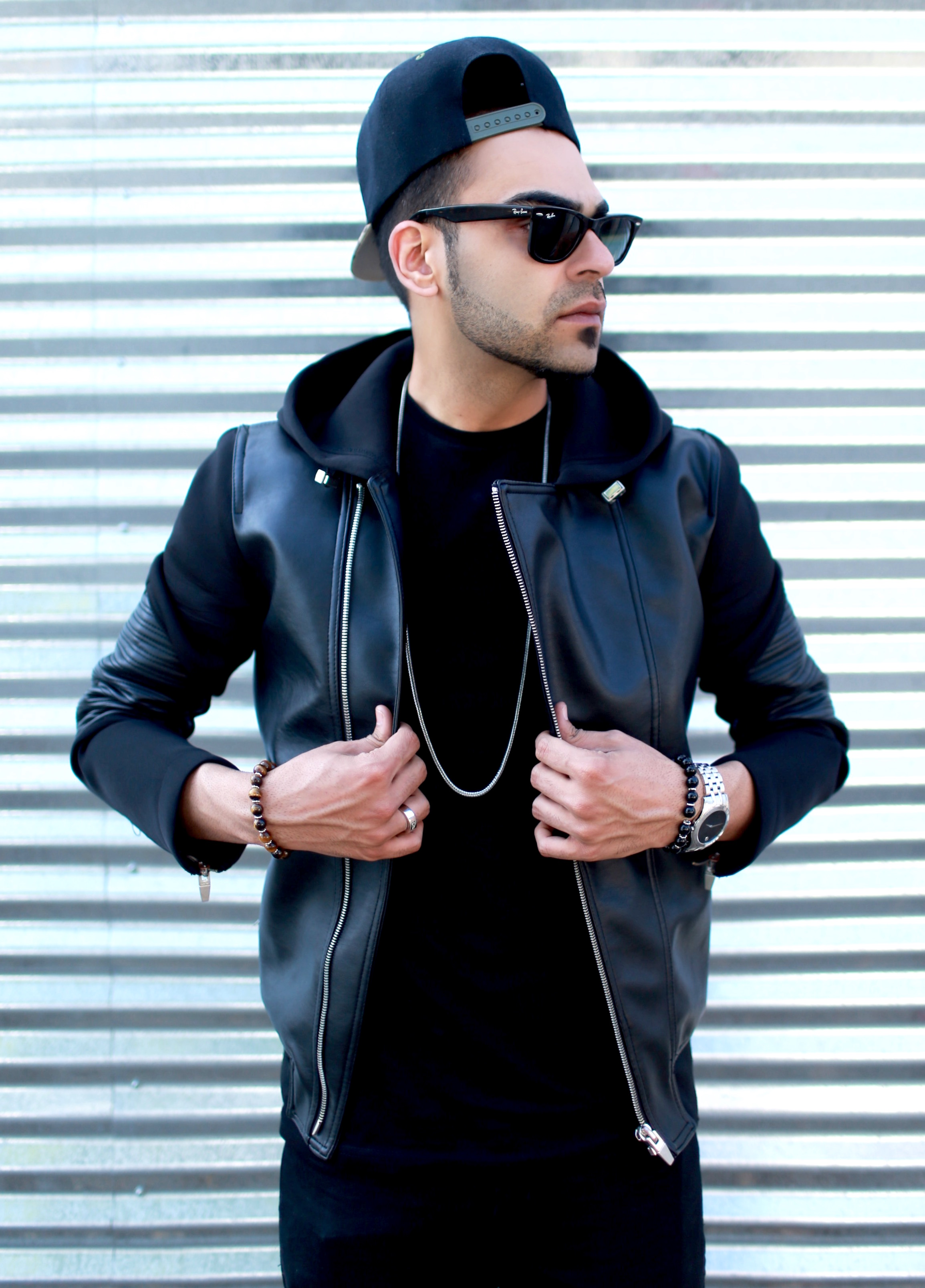
- UpsideDown in 2016

Background information
- Also known as: UpsideDown, DJ UpsideDown
- Born: New Delhi, India
- Origin: Toronto, Ontario, Canada
- Genres: EDM; Hip hop; Pop; World
- Occupations: Musician; DJ; remixer; record producer
- Years active: 2012–present
- Labels: UrbanAsian Music, Speed Records, Tips Music
- Website: djupsidedown.com

UpsideDown is a Canadian producer and DJ of Indian descent. He primarily produces EDM, Hip Hop, R&B, Pop and Fusion Music and is influenced by American producers such as Kanye West, Dr. Dre, Timbaland and others. UpsideDown's style of production consists of combining traditional instruments with modern rhythm and percussion.

== Early life ==
UpsideDown was born in New Delhi, India and raised in Toronto, Ontario, where he produced for underground Hip hop and R&B artists. He attended college and studied Mechanical Engineering to pursue a career in Technology and later moved to Los Angeles to pursue Music.

== Career ==
UpsideDown collaborated with Mickey Singh & Amar Sandhu to produce music for the records "Tonight" and "Rooftop Party" which were released through Speed Records in 2015. He also produced a Dance Version (Remix) of the title track for the movie Ambarsariya featuring vocals by Diljit Dosanjh which was released through Tips Music in 2015.

UpsideDown appeared on BBC Radio 1 hosted by Bobby Friction in 2016. for his track "How Many Shots" featuring vocals by Amar Sandhu. He also released a track on BBC Radio 1 called "Only You" featuring vocals by R&B singer Anthony Lewis.

In 2016, UpsideDown produced the records "Phone" and "Hold Me" for Mickey Singh.

In March 2016, UpsideDown participated in New York's first Urban Music Conference alongside other South Asian artists such as Raghav, Mickey Singh, Raxstar, The Prophec, Amar Sandhu and others.

In 2017, he produced the track 'Temple" for Jasmin Walia alongside Zack Knight.

UpsideDown collaborated with Asim Azhar in 2017 and produced the track "5 AM".

On May 10, 2018, UpsideDown released his first solo single "Got It All" featuring fellow Canadian singer songwriter The PropheC. The music video starred Bollywood actress Sunny Leone.

UpsideDown released another single "Cyclone" on August 2, 2018 which featured UK based artist Jaz Dhami. The track was released through Saavn's Artist Originals.

In December 2018, UpsideDown released an Electronic/Dance EP titled "Ups & Downs".

== Production Discography ==
| Track Title | Artist | Music Producer |
|---|---|---|
| Freak (Remix) | Rishi Rich, Jay Sean, Juggy D, | Rishi Rich, UpsideDown |
| Pagg Waala Munda (Remix) | Diljit Dosanjh, Tarannum Malik, | Jatinder Shah, UpsideDown |
| Tonight | Amar Sandhu | UpsideDown, PRANNA |
| 4AM (AfterHours) | Amar Sandhu | UpsideDown, PRANNA |
| Rooftop Party | Amar Sandhu, Mickey Singh | UpsideDown |
| Switch | Bikram Singh, Samica | UpsideDown |
| Phone | Mickey Singh, UpsideDown | UpsideDown |
| Naina (Remix) | The PropheC, Mickey Singh | UpsideDown |
| Hold Me | Mickey Singh, UpsideDown | UpsideDown |
| Temple | Jasmin Walia | UpsideDown, Zack Knight |
| 5 AM | Asim Azhar, UpsideDown | UpsideDown |
| Only You | UpsideDown, Anthony Lewis | UpsideDown |
| Got It All | UpsideDown, The PropheC | UpsideDown |
| Dunya | Asim Azhar, UpsideDown | UpsideDown |
| Cyclone | UpsideDown, Jaz Dhami | UpsideDown |
| Jaan Di | The PropheC, UpsideDown | UpsideDown |
| 2AM | Rhea Raj, UpsideDown | UpsideDown |
| Nakhra | UpsideDown, Happy Singh | UpsideDown |
| Fallin' | UpsideDown, ICONYK | UpsideDown, ICONYK |
| Senorita | UpsideDown, Studio Pirates | UpsideDown, Studio Pirates |
| Need Me | UpsideDown, Rhea Raj | UpsideDown, Rhea Raj |
| Delete | G Sidhu, Amar Sandhu, UpsideDown | UpsideDown |
| Humraah | Malang - The Movie | The Fusion Project, UpsideDown |
| Burj Khalifa | Laxmii -The Movie | UpsideDown, Shashi-DJKhushi |

== Albums ==
- Ups & Downs (EP)

== Track listing ==
All tracks are written by UpsideDown.

| No. | Title | Length |
|---|---|---|
| 1. | "X Intro" | 1:52 |
| 2. | "Got Dat Juice" | 2:22 |
| 3. | "Wake & Make" | 3:12 |
| 4. | "Wonky Shit" | 2:30 |
| 5. | "Turn Up The Bass" | 2:26 |
| 6. | "Make Beats Not War" | 2:55 |
| 7. | "Flute" | 3:17 |
| 8. | "Bounce" | 2:33 |
