= Amar Sandhu =

American singer

- Born: 6 January 1990 (age 36); Dallas, Texas, United States
- Height: 6'3
- Musical career
- Also known as: @amarsandhumusic
- Born: Amarpal S Sandhu
- Genres: Punjabi, Hip-Hop, R&B, Pop, House
- Occupations: Singer, songwriter, record producer
- Years active: 2007-present
- Label: Independent
- Website: Official Website

Amar Sandhu is an American-born Punjabi and Hindi singer, songwriter, music composer and producer. He is best known for his unique Punjabi/English fusion sound and his 2015 Album "New Era", featuring hits such as "Rooftop Party", "Double Addi", and "Replaceable".

== Early life ==
Sandhu was born in Dallas, Texas, and raised in the Dallas suburb Rockwall, Texas.

Before singing, Sandhu starting his musical journey by creating remixes of popular Punjabi songs which quickly led to him becoming a DJ. He was also a percussionist, playing instruments such as the dhol, dholki, and tabla. His talents were quickly noticed by Houston's popular Dhol Beat International.

== Career ==
=== Early career ===
Sandhu released his first single "Ni Udaleh" in 2011, collaborating with Dhol Beat International. Afterwards in 2012, he released a Punjabi remix of Rihanna's "Birthday Cake" along with Mickey Singh. Due to the large success of the Birthday Cake remix, Amar Sandhu followed up with another collaboration with Mickey Singh titled "Double Addi".

=== Debut ===
Amar Sandhu started gaining a large following throughout North America, touring various singles without the release of a proper studio produced album. It was in 2015 he teamed up with his long time friend, the talented North American producer, Pranna to bring fans the much awaited album, "New Era". The album released with the drop of its first single "Tonight" followed up by "Rooftop Party", which has gone on to become a huge success worldwide accumulating over 11 million views on YouTube.

After the release of his album, Amar Sandhu went on his first official tour with Pranna, that had many stops in North America, notably the first Urban Desi Concert and Conference in New York City.

=== Present ===
Since the release of New Era, Sandhu has been working on his 2nd studio production album titled "Coast.America", which is due to release in 2018. The first single was released on Valentines Day, 14 February 2018, titled "Lovers Island" which was produced by Epic Bhangra.

He has also been featuring on various songs, "Dance Floor" by Sabih Nawab, "15 Minutes" by Fateh, "Speed" by Haji Springer, and "Rewind" by Raxstar.

Though Sandhu has concluded his New Era tour, he has been traveling around the world doing various shows.

Most recently in Aug 2020 Sandhu released his new EP (Extended Play) "Long Weekends" which featured prominent artists like DJ UpsideDown, DJ Harpz, DJ Lyan, etc.

== Discography ==
=== As lead artist ===
Title	Year	Peak chart position		Label	Album
Title	Year	UK Asian	UK Punjabi	Label	Album
Mood	2020	35	20	VIP Records	Long Weekends
Sandhu Takeover	2020	5	2	Collab Creations	

=== As featured artist ===
Title	Year	Peak chart position		Label	Album
Title	Year	UK Asian	UK Punjabi	Label	Album
Armani (Zack Knightfeaturing Amar Sandhu)	2021	4	2	Revolve Records	
Kach Wangu (Navaan Sandhu featuring Amar Sandhu)	2023	—	—	Navaan Sandhu	Naveezy

== Discography ==
- New Era (2015)
- Coast.America (2018)
- Long Weekends (2020)
