= Sonu Ke Titu Ki Sweety (soundtrack) =

2018 soundtrack album

Soundtrack album by Rochak Kohli, Yo Yo Honey Singh, Amaal Mallik, Guru Randhawa, Zack Knight, Saurabh-Vaibhav and Rajat Nagpal
- Released: 14 February 2018
- Recorded: 2015–2018
- Genre: Feature film soundtrack
- Length: 30:13
- Language: Hindi
- Label: T-Series
External audio
- Audio Jukebox on YouTube

Rochak Kohli chronology
| Aiyaary (2018) | Sonu Ke Titu Ki Sweety (2018) | Satyameva Jayate (2018) |

Yo Yo Honey Singh chronology
| Roy (2015) | Sonu Ke Titu Ki Sweety (2018) | Mitron (2018) |

Amaal Mallik chronology
| Shaandaar (2015) | Sonu Ke Titu Ki Sweety (2018) | Badla (2019) |

Zack Knight chronology
| ABCD 2 (2015) | Sonu Ke Titu Ki Sweety (2018) | Till I Met You (2018) |

Guru Randhawa and Rajat Nagpal chronology
| Welcome Back (2015) | Sonu Ke Titu Ki Sweety (2018) | Dil Juunglee (2018) |

Saurabh-Vaibhav chronology
| Dil Dhadakne Do (2015) | Sonu Ke Titu Ki Sweety (2018) | Birbal Trilogy Case 1 (2018) |

Singles from Sonu Ke Titu Ki Sweety
- 1. "Dil Chori" Released: 23 December 2017; 2. "Subah Subah" Released: 4 January 2018; 3. "Chhote Chhote Peg" Released: 15 January 2018; 4. "Tera Yaar Hoon Mein" Released: 31 January 2018; 5. "Bom Diggy Diggy" Released: 8 February 2018

Sonu Ke Titu Ki Sweety is the soundtrack to the 2018 film of the same name. The music of the film has been composed by Rochak Kohli, Yo Yo Honey Singh, Amaal Mallik, Guru Randhawa, Zack Knight, Saurabh-Vaibhav and Rajat Nagpal while lyrics have been penned by Kumaar, Yo Yo Honey Singh, Swapnil Tiwari, Zack Knight, Guru Randhawa, Singhsta and Oye Sheraa. The score is composed by Hitesh Sonik. The album was released under the T-Series label on 14 February 2018.

== Release ==
The soundtrack was preceded with the first song "Dil Chori" is a remake of the Hans Raj Hans' song "Dil Chori Sada Ho Gaya" from his album Chorni (2000). composed, co-written and performed by Yo Yo Honey Singh. Anticipated to be Singh's first song after a two-year hiatus, as he was suffering from bipolar disorder, It was released as a single on 23 December 2017. The song "Subah Subah" was sung by Arijit Singh, Prakriti Kakar and Amaal Mallik was released on 4 January 2018. It was produced by Latvian producer Tobu under the pseudonym 'Candyland'.

The song "Chhote Chhote Peg", which was a remake of the Hans Raj Hans' song "Dil Tote Tote Ho Gaya" from the film Bichhoo (2000) was sung by Yo Yo Honey Singh, Neha Kakkar and Navraj Hans, was released on 15 January 2018. The song "Tera Yaar Hoon Main" was released as a single on 31 January; it was composed by Rochak Kohli, with lyrics written by Kumaar and sung by Arijit Singh.

The song, "Bom Diggy Diggy", which is a party song, is a remake of the 2015 Punjabi-English song "Bom Diggy" by British-Pakistani singer Zack Knight and British-Indian singer Jasmin Walia, and the chorus samples a Bengali folk song. The song was released on 8 February 2018. The music album of the film was released by T-Series on 14 February 2018 on Valentines Day.

== Critical reception ==
Joginder Tuteja of Bollywood Hungama rated 3 out of 5 and wrote "Sonu Ke Titu Ki Sweety is a rather loaded affair with as many as eight songs filling in the proceedings. Majority of songs end up working quite well, hence making it a wholesome winning affair." Devansh Sharma of Firstpost wrote "Sonu Ke Titu Ki Sweety boasts of a lot of music, but most of it is borrowed. Thus, T-Series only traverses tested waters and churns out songs mostly below its unrivaled potential. But the songs are sure to pull audiences into theatres as well as drive the narrative of what seems to be an entertaining romantic comedy."

== Track listing ==
| No. | Title | Lyrics | Music | Singer(s) | Length |
|---|---|---|---|---|---|
| 1. | "Dil Chori" | Yo Yo Honey Singh, Singhsta, Oye Sheraa | Yo Yo Honey Singh | Yo Yo Honey Singh, Simar Kaur, Ishers | 3:46 |
| 2. | "Subah Subah" | Kumaar | Amaal Mallik | Arijit Singh, Prakriti Kakar, Amaal Mallik | 4:37 |
| 3. | "Chhote Chhote Peg" | Yo Yo Honey Singh | Yo Yo Honey Singh | Yo Yo Honey Singh, Neha Kakkar, Navraj Hans | 3:24 |
| 4. | "Bom Diggy Diggy" | Zack Knight, Kumaar | Zack Knight | Zack Knight, Jasmin Walia | 3:58 |
| 5. | "Kaun Nachdi" | Guru Randhawa | Guru Randhawa, Rajat Nagpal | Guru Randhawa, Neeti Mohan | 3:03 |
| 6. | "Lakk Mera Hit" | Kumaar | Rochak Kohli | Sukriti Kakar, Mannat Noor, Rochak Kohli | 3:54 |
| 7. | "Tera Yaar Hoon Main" | Kumaar | Rochak Kohli | Arijit Singh | 4:24 |
| 8. | "Sweety Slowly Slowly" | Swapnil Tiwari | Saurabh-Vaibhav | Mika Singh | 3:07 |
| Total length: | | | | | 30:13 |

== Accolades ==
| Award (Note: Awards, festivals and organizations are in alphabetical order.) | Date of ceremony (Note: Date is linked to the article about the awards held that year, wherever possible.) | Category | Recipient(s) | Result | Ref. |
|---|---|---|---|---|---|
| Filmfare Awards | 23 March 2019 | Best Music Director | Rochak Kohli, Yo Yo Honey Singh, Amaal Mallik, Guru Randhawa, Zack Knight, Saurabh-Vaibhav and Rajat Nagpal | Nominated | |
| Filmfare Awards | 23 March 2019 | Best Lyricist | Kumaar – ("Tera Yaar Hoon Main") | Nominated | |
| Filmfare Awards | 23 March 2019 | Best Male Playback Singer | Arijit Singh – ("Tera Yaar Hoon Main") | Nominated | |
| International Indian Film Academy Awards | 18 September 2019 | Best Music Director | Rochak Kohli, Yo Yo Honey Singh, Amaal Mallik, Guru Randhawa, Zack Knight, Saurabh-Vaibhav and Rajat Nagpal | Won | |
| International Indian Film Academy Awards | 18 September 2019 | Best Male Playback Singer | Arijit Singh – ("Tera Yaar Hoon Main") | Nominated | |
| Mirchi Music Awards | 16 February 2019 | Album of The Year | — | Nominated | |
| Mirchi Music Awards | 16 February 2019 | Listeners' Choice Album of the Year | — | Won | |
| Mirchi Music Awards | 16 February 2019 | Song of The Year | "Bom Diggy Diggy" | Nominated | |
| Mirchi Music Awards | 16 February 2019 | Listeners' Choice Song of the Year | "Dil Chori" | Won | |
| Mirchi Music Awards | 16 February 2019 | Lyricist of The Year | Kumaar – ("Tera Yaar Hoon Main") | Nominated | |
| Mirchi Music Awards | 16 February 2019 | Upcoming Female Vocalist of The Year | Jasmin Walia – ("Bom Diggy Diggy") | Nominated | |
| Screen Awards | 16 December 2018 | Best Music Director | Rochak Kohli, Yo Yo Honey Singh, Amaal Mallik, Guru Randhawa, Zack Knight, Saurabh-Vaibhav and Rajat Nagpal | Nominated | |
| Zee Cine Awards | 19 March 2019 | Best Music Director | Rochak Kohli, Yo Yo Honey Singh, Amaal Mallik, Guru Randhawa, Zack Knight, Saurabh-Vaibhav and Rajat Nagpal | Nominated | |
| Zee Cine Awards | 19 March 2019 | Best Song of the Year | "Bom Diggy Diggy" | Nominated | |
