= Adam Saleh =

American YouTube personality (born 1993)

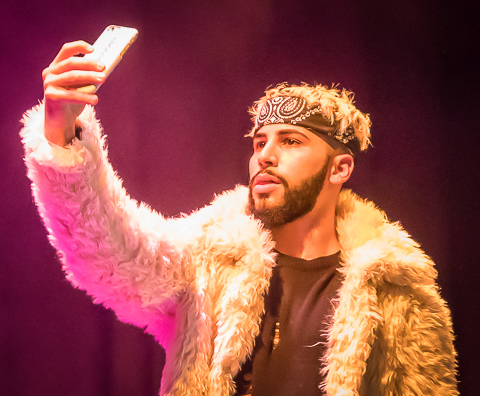
- Saleh in 2016
- Born: Adam Mohsin Yehya Saleh; June 4, 1993 (age 33); New York City, U.S.
- Occupation: YouTuber
- Years active: 2012–present (YouTuber) 2008–present (Boxer)

YouTube information
- Channels: Adam Saleh; Adam Saleh Vlogs
- Genre: Vlogs
- Subscribers: 2.65 million (Adam Saleh); 4.65 million (Adam Saleh Vlogs)
- Views: 260.47 million (Adam Saleh); 1.53 billion (Adam Saleh Vlogs)
- Last updated: February 22, 2026

Adam Mohsin Yehya Saleh (Arabic: آدم محسن يحيى صالح; born June 4, 1993) is an American YouTuber, singer, and crossover boxer. He gained prominence through his various YouTube channels, where he posts vlogs, comedy sketches, and social experiments.

He began his career in 2012 as part of the collaborative YouTube channel TrueStoryASA, before transitioning into solo content creation. He has also ventured into various different industries, most notably in music with the release of his debut album Chapter II in 2017, and boxing where he has fought five different times against different other creators.

His online presence has been marked by both popularity and controversy. He has faced criticism for staging social experiments and making false claims.

== Early life ==
Adam Saleh was born in Brooklyn, New York City, on June 4, 1993, to Muslim Yemeni parents. He is the fifth of six surviving siblings, with three of his elder brothers dying in infancy. He went to Manhattan Center for Science and Mathematics High School for three years, but transferred to Al-Madinah School after being expelled for hitting his dean's computer as a response to him allegedly making racist remarks towards his mother.

His main career aspiration was to become a lawyer. Saleh's uncle had died from a car accident just a few days before his cousin's wedding. Saleh describes his uncle as a very happy person and was an important member of his family and when he died in such circumstances it left their family in grief. The way his uncle had died had left an emotional scar as Saleh's has stated in the past that it is one of the reasons why he refused to have a drivers license. He eventually received a drivers license later on.

== YouTube career ==
=== TrueStoryASA ===
Saleh started making YouTube videos in 2012 as a part of his YouTube channel "TrueStoryASA" with his high school friends Abdullah Ghuman and Sheikh Akbar. His main career aspiration was to become a lawyer. He gained nationwide popularity when he appeared on The Ellen DeGeneres Show for his dancing antics. The day his Ellen show appearance was to happen, he had a final test, but chose to go on Ellen; he later described this as the turning point in his career as a full-time YouTuber. Saleh first released the single "Diamond Girl" on May 3, 2015, featuring Sheikh Akbar and Mumzy Stranger as a part of TrueStoryASA. On August 16, 2015, he released his debut solo single, "Tears" featuring Zack Knight, as a tribute to his cousin and his uncle. After TrueStoryASA ended, Saleh took over both the main and vlog channels and renamed them "Adam Saleh" and "Adam Saleh Vlogs". There was controversy about why the groups had split up. Some rumors say the problem was between Saleh and Akbar, and many of Saleh's fans blame his manager for the split. In September 2017, Saleh released his debut album called Chapter II featuring collaborations with many artists, including "Waynak" (with Faydee),"Tsunami", "All About Love", "The Motto" (with Kennyon Brown), and "All You Can Handle" (with Demarco). On February 18, 2018, he accepted the challenge to be KSI's next boxing opponent.

== Boxing career ==
=== Amateur career ===
==== Saleh vs Stephenson ====
On September 29, 2019, Saleh fought British amateur boxer Marcus Stephenson in a charity event for Yemen at the York Hall in London, England. Saleh won via unanimous decision. Saleh's then manager and Stephenson both later stated the fight was rigged and that Stephenson agreed to lose for a cash sum.

=== Professional career ===
==== Saleh vs. McBroom ====
On September 10, 2022, Saleh made his professional debut against American YouTuber Landon McBroom, younger brother of Austin McBroom, at the Banc of California Stadium in Los Angeles California, U.S. for the ICB International middleweight belt. The bout ended in a unanimous draw. Saleh made a purse of about $100,000 from the fight.

==== Saleh vs Kellogg ====
Saleh faced American TikToker Stuart Kellogg, also known as Evil Hero, on February 26, 2023, featured on the undercard of Jake Paul and Tommy Fury's long anticipated professional bout, at Diriyah Arena in Diriyah, Saudi Arabia. Saleh won via RTD due to Kellogg suffering an arm injury, putting Saleh's record at 1–0–1.

=== Exhibition bouts ===
==== Saleh vs Sharks ====
On July 30, 2021, Saleh fought Iraqi TikToker Walid Sharks as the co-feature bout on the first Social Knockout event at the Coca-Cola Arena in Dubai, UAE. The bout ended in a majority draw. Controversies rose as many questioned how the bout ended as a draw including popular YouTuber FaZe Sensei who stated "it's mathematically impossible for the fight to end in a draw" seeing as the bout was only three rounds.

==== Saleh vs Elshayib ====
On October 15, Saleh fought Jordanian Influencer Anas Elshayb on the second Social Knockout event at the Coca-Cola Arena in Dubai, UAE. Saleh won via unanimous decision.

== Controversies ==
=== Racial profiling social experiment ===
A staged video titled "Racial Profiling Experiment'" uploaded on Saleh's YouTube channel in October 2014 became popular around the world. In the video, Saleh and Sheikh Akbar argued with each other in front of a police officer wearing western outfits but the cop ignored them. Shortly thereafter, they fight again while dressed in traditional clothes but this time the cop stops them and behaves rudely with them. The video received more than 200,000 views on YouTube and it was also picked up by media. Public reaction to the video was against the police officer. Later Saleh said that the video was staged to recreate "previous events that occurred", and it was being shown as an example to others about how these things can happen to people on the streets only if they are dressed in a 'different' way. The New York chapter of the Council on American–Islamic Relations (CAIR), which had previously tweeted out the video as an example of discrimination against Muslims, demanded an apology from Saleh and Akbar stating "Muslims are already under the microscope and to do this just to gain some cheap publicity is totally unacceptable. There should be no attempt to justify it; they should just apologize and ask people to forgive them for their irresponsible actions."

=== Tigerair smuggling video ===
In another YouTube video, Saleh claimed to have flown inside a suitcase in the baggage hold on a Tigerair flight from Melbourne to Sydney. However, Melbourne Airport security footage proved the incident was a hoax after they produced video showing Saleh boarding the plane with the airline noting that a bag of his weight would not be loaded on the plane without investigation nor would a passenger in the plane's unheated cargo hold emerge sweating.

=== EduBird controversy ===
In 2018, Saleh, as well as other YouTubers, were involved in a BBC Trending investigation for promoting the website EduBirdie, which lets users buy essays (promoting cheating).

=== Delta flight controversy ===
In December 2016, Saleh claimed he was removed from a Delta Air Lines flight at Heathrow Airport for speaking Arabic. However, other passengers have spoken out, claiming that Saleh was disturbing other passengers, and Delta's own statement said that Saleh was shouting and provoking others. Saleh's manager also stated this, explaining that Saleh did not sue the airline. Saleh's claim has caused a debate over the "Right to Fly".

=== Antisemitic claims ===
Saleh has instigated multiple incidents that were deemed antisemitic by Zionist sources during the ongoing Gaza war. Incidents include Saleh harassing patrons at a Starbucks and threatening an Israel supporter, attempting to engage in a physical fight, eventually chasing him through Washington Square Park. This led to DAZN suspending Saleh of any involvement with Misfits Boxing. Israeli martial artist Natan Levy challenged Saleh to a fight.

== Boxing record ==
=== Professional ===
2 fights	1 win	0 losses
By knockout	1	0
Draws	1	

No.	Result	Record	Opponent	Type	Round, time	Date	Location	Notes
2	Win	1–0–1	Evil Hero	RTD	1 (4), 3:00	Feb 26, 2023	Diriyah Arena, Diriyah, Saudi Arabia	
1	Draw	0–0–1	Landon McBroom	UD	4	Sep 10, 2022	Banc of California Stadium, Los Angeles, California	

=== Exhibition ===
4 fights	3 wins	0 losses
By decision	3	0
Draws	1	

No.	Result	Record	Opponent	Type	Round, time	Date	Location	Notes
4	Win	3–0–1	Pully Arif	UD	5	Nov 7, 2025	Worldwide Stages, Nashville, Tennessee, U.S.	
3	Win	2–0–1	Pully Arif	SD	4	May 16, 2025	Brand Risk Warehouse, Miami, Florida, U.S.	
2	Win	1–0–1	Anas Elshayib	UD	3	Oct 15, 2021	Coca-Cola Arena, Dubai, UAE	
1	Draw	0–0–1	Walid Sharks	MD	3	July 30, 2021	Coca-Cola Arena, Dubai, UAE	

== Discography ==
=== Studio albums ===
Title	Details
Chapter II	Released: 29 October 2017; Label: Naz Promotions; Format: Digital download, streaming

=== Singles ===
==== As lead artist ====
List of lead singles with year released
Title	Year	Album
"Dimond Girl" (with Sheikh Akbar featuring Mumzy Stranger)	2015	Non-album singles
"Tears" (featuring Zack Knight)	2015	Non-album singles
"Tomorrow's Another Day" (featuring Mumzy Stranger)	2015	Non-album singles
"All You Can Handle" (featuring Demarco)	2017	Non-album singles
"Waynak" (featuring Faydee)	2017	Non-album singles
"Partner in Crime" (with Slim Albaher)	2017	Non-album singles
"Gimmie That" (featuring Zack Knight)	2017	Non-album singles
"The Motto" (featuring Kennyon Brown)	2017	Non-album singles
"Instagram Famous" (with Zack Knight)	2018	Non-album singles
"Ya Gaye"	2020	Non-album singles
"Crash & Burn" (with Zack Knight)	2020	Non-album singles
"Mashallah" (with Fousey)	2021	Non-album singles

==== As a featured artist ====
List of featured singles year released
Title	Year	Album
"On My Way" (James Yammouni with Faydee featuring Adam Saleh)	2017	Non-album singles
