= The PropheC =

Indo-Canadian singer, songwriter, and record producer

- Born: Neal Chatha; September 8, 1991 (age 34)
- Origin: Calgary, Alberta, Canada
- Genres: Punjabi; Urban Desi; Pop; Bhangra
- Occupations: Singer; songwriter; record producer
- Years active: 2010–present
- Labels: PropheC Productions; T-Series; VIP Records; Artist Originals; JioSaavn; Urban Asian Music
- Website: theprophec.com

Neal Chatha (born September 8, 1991), known by his stage name The PropheC, is an Indo-Canadian singer, songwriter, and record producer. His debut album, Forever, was released in 2011, and contained one of his first hit single "Sohni". Since then, he has released five studio albums; Futureproof (2014), The Lifestyle (2016), The Season (2019), Solace (2021), Midnight Paradise (2023) and a mixtape titled The Dream Room (2013). Chatha is the founder of his own record label PropheC Productions.

== Early life ==
Chatha was born on September 8, 1991, in Calgary, Alberta, Canada, to a Sikh family. His father is Daljit Chatha. The PropheC first started singing at age five, and was classically trained soon after. By age of 16, he began producing his own beats and original songs in his basement. After writing his first official song, "Sohni", he decided he could turn his passion into a career. While pursuing his ambitions in music, he also completed his education, earning a degree from Mount Royal University in business marketing.

== Career ==
The PropheC attributes his inspiration to be from all varieties of music, notably figures from both the South Asian music industry such as A. R. Rahman, Nusrat Fateh Ali Khan, and Western music, particularly Drake. Since the launch of his career, he has collaborated with artists such as Ezu, Mickey Singh, Raxstar, Fateh, Jus Reign, Amrit Maan, Sidhu Moose Wala and Ikka. The PropheC has toured in Europe and North America. He has also performed in India. He made his film soundtrack debut with the 2023 Hindi-language film Selfiee. The PropheC also appeared on American DJ KSHMR's 2023 album Karam, on the song "Mere Bina", alongside Talha Anjum.

== Discography ==
=== Studio albums ===
- Forever (2011)
- Futureproof (2014)
- The Lifestyle (2016)
- The Season (2019)
- Solace (2021)
- Midnight Paradise (2023)
- The Remedy (2024)

=== Film soundtrack ===
- Selfiee (2023) - 1 song

=== Mixtapes ===
- The Dream Room (2013)

==== As lead artist ====
Song title	Year	Artist(s)	Album
Sohni	2010	The PropheC, DeepC	Forever
Shine	2013	The PropheC	The Dream Room
Dukh	2013	The PropheC, Mickey Singh	The Dream Room
Sajna	2014	The PropheC, Rashi Sood	Futureproof
Chall Mere Naal	2014	The PropheC, Fateh	
Taur	2015	The PropheC	
Lost	2016	The PropheC	
Hove Mere Naal (featuring Ikka)	2016	The PropheC, Ikka	The Lifestyle
Rumors (with Fateh, Jus Reign)	2016	The PropheC, Fateh, Jus Reign	The Lifestyle
Kina Chir	2016	The PropheC	The Lifestyle
Let Me Live	2016	The PropheC	The Lifestyle
Drama (Be Real)	2016	The PropheC	The Lifestyle
Feelin	2017	The PropheC	
Chakkar (with Bambi Bains, DJ Harpz)	2017	The PropheC, Bambi Bains, DJ Harpz	
Vibe	2018	The PropheC	
Hit Me Up	2018	The PropheC	
Haani	2019	The PropheC	The Season
Where You Been	2019	The PropheC	The Season
Tu Hi Ah	2019	The PropheC	
Vaari	2019	The PropheC	
Yaara Tu (with Ezu)	2019	The PropheC, EZU	Arrival
Kitho	2020	The PropheC	
Questions	2020	The PropheC	
Close	2021	The PropheC	Solace
Kach	2021	The PropheC	Solace
Maula (with Sardool Sikander)	2021	The PropheC, Sardool Sikander	Solace
Sambh	2021	The PropheC	Solace
Solace	2021	The PropheC	Solace
To The Stars	2021	The PropheC	
Nai Chaidi	2021	The PropheC	
Waja	2022	The PropheC	
Secrets	2022	The PropheC	
Mehrma (with DJ Lyan)	2022	The PropheC, DJ Lyan	Midnight Paradise
Dilawara (with Ezu)	2023	The PropheC, Ezu	Midnight Paradise
Dilawara - Acoustic (with Ezu)	2023	The PropheC, Ezu	
Manave (with Mitraz)	2023	The PropheC, Mitraz	Midnight Paradise
Gabru	2023	The PropheC	Midnight Paradise
Mang	2023	The PropheC	Midnight Paradise
Behzubaan	2023	The PropheC	Midnight Paradise
Haq	2023	The PropheC	Midnight Paradise
Jaan (Prod. By MXRCI)	2023	The PropheC	Midnight Paradise
Locket	2023	The PropheC	Midnight Paradise
Stay	2023	The PropheC	Midnight Paradise
Endless & Malang (with Noor Chahal)	2023	The PropheC, Noor Chahal	Midnight Paradise
Tears (Prod. By MXRCI)	2023	The PropheC	Midnight Paradise
Midnight Paradise	2023	The PropheC	Midnight Paradise

=== As songwriter/Producer ===
Title	Year	Artist(s)	Album
Dholna	2013	Raashi Sood, The PropheC	
Udeek	2015	Raashi Sood	
Beparwah	2016	Raashi Sood	
Tere Bina	2016	Gagan Sharma	
Rusiya Na Kar	2016	Bikram Singh, The PropheC	
Ki Kargeyi	2018	Raxstar, The PropheC	Glass Ceiling
Funk	2018	Pav Dharia, Fateh, J-STATIK, The PropheC, Amar Sandhu	
Body Language	2019	Ikka, THEMXXNLIGHT	
Nindra	2020	Ikka	
