= Bader Al-Dherat =

Jordanian boxer (born 2000)

Personal information
- Nickname: The Master
- Born: Bader Osama Majed Al-Dherat; 2 June 2000 (age 26) Amman, Jordan
- Height: 5 ft 7½ in
- Weight: Lightweight

Boxing career
- Stance: Orthodox

Boxing record
- Total fights: 11
- Wins: 11
- Win by KO: 8
Medal record
Men's amateur boxing
Representing Jordan
AIBA Youth World Boxing Championships
Bronze medal – third place	2018 Budapest	Light welterweight

Bader Osama Majed Al-Dherat (Arabic: بدر أسامة ماجد الظهيرات; born 2 June 2000) is a Jordanian professional boxer.

== Early life ==
Bader Osama Majed Al-Dherat was born on 2 June 2000 in Amman, Jordan. Al-Dherat's brother, Hesham Al-Dherat, is an amateur boxer who represented Jordan in the Tokyo Olympics qualifiers. He originally started training football as its unrivalled popularity compared to other sports in Jordan.

== Amateur career ==
Al-Dherat started boxing when he was 12 years old after his brother, Hesham Al-Dherat, suggested it to him.

Al-Dherat partook in the 2018 AIBA Youth World Boxing Championships representing his country Jordan in the lightweight division. Al-Dherat managed to win a bronze metal after reaching third place while having an injured arm.

== Professional career ==
Al-Dherat moved to Dubai once he made his professional debut as his country Jordan didn't have the facilities for professional boxing. Al-Dherat made his professional debut on 12 March 2021 against Joshua Barnor (8–5), defeating him via technical knockout in the second round.

On 28 May 2021, Al-Dherat fought Moaaz Allam (2–1) on the Thor Björnsson vs Simon Vallily undercard at the Concord Hotel in Dubai. Al-Dherat defeated Allam via technical knockout in the first round. On 20 August 2022, Al-Dherat fought Fuad Tarverdi (5–2) on the Oleksandr Usyk vs Anthony Joshua II undercard at King Abdullah Sports City in Jeddah, Saudi Arabia. Al-Dherat defeated Tarverdi via knockout in the first round. On 26 February 2023, Al-Dherat fought Viorel Simion (23–9) on the Jake Paul vs Tommy Fury undercard at the Diriyah Arena in Diriyah, Saudi Arabia. Al-Dherat defeated Simion via technical knockout in the first round.

On 9 September, Al-Dherat fought Mexican boxer Jose Paez Gonzales (16–2–2) as the headliner bout after it was announced on 1 September that Rising Stars Arabia and DAZN had signed a global distribution deal. Al-Dherat defeated Gonzales via technical knockout at the Mubadala Arena in Abu Dhabi. On 25 May 2024, Al-Dherat headlined Rising Stars Arabia on DAZN a second time against Orlando Mosquera (13–2–1) at the Space 42 Arena in Abu Dabi. Al-Dherat defeated Mosquero via split decision.

== Professional boxing record ==
12 fights	12 wins	0 losses
By knockout	9	0
By decision	3	0

No.	Result	Record	Opponent	Type	Round, time	Date	Location	Notes
12	Win	12–0	Charles Chilala	TKO	4 (8), 0:06	6 Dec 2024	World Trade Centre, Dubai, UAE	
11	Win	11–0	Orlando Mosquera	SD	10	25 May 2024	Space 42 Arena, Abu Dhabi, UAE	
10	Win	10–0	Jeff Ofori	MD	10	13 Jan 2024	Yas Golf Links, Abu Dhabi, UAE	
9	Win	9–0	Jose Paez Gonzales	TKO	5 (10), 1:37	9 Sep 2023	Mubadala Arena, Abu Dhabi, UAE	
8	Win	8–0	Viorel Simion	TKO	1 (8), 1:26	26 Feb 2023	Diriyah Arena, Diriyah, Saudi Arabia	
7	Win	7–0	Murodjon Yokubov	TKO	3 (8), 2:12	26 Nov 2022	Hilton Dubai, Dubai, UAE	
6	Win	6–0	Fuad Tarverdi	TKO	4 (4), 1:16	20 Aug 2022	King Abdullah Sports City, Jeddah, Saudi Arabia	
5	Win	5–0	Denis Bartos	TKO	4 (6), 1:14	19 Mar 2022	Duty Free Tennis Stadium, Dubai, UAE	
4	Win	4–0	Digari Mahesh	KO	1 (6), 2:58	26 Nov 2021	Motospace Dubai Investment Park, Dubai, UAE	
3	Win	3–0	Sharobiddin Jurakhonov	UD	6	20 Aug 2021	Concord Hotel, Dubai, UAE	
2	Win	2–0	Moaaz Allam	TKO	1 (4), 2:52	28 May 2021	Concord Hotel, Dubai, UAE	
1	Win	1–0	Joshua Barnor	TKO	2 (4), 2:18	12 Mar 2021	Round 10 Boxing Club, Dubai, UAE	
