= H-Dhami =

Hartinder Dhami
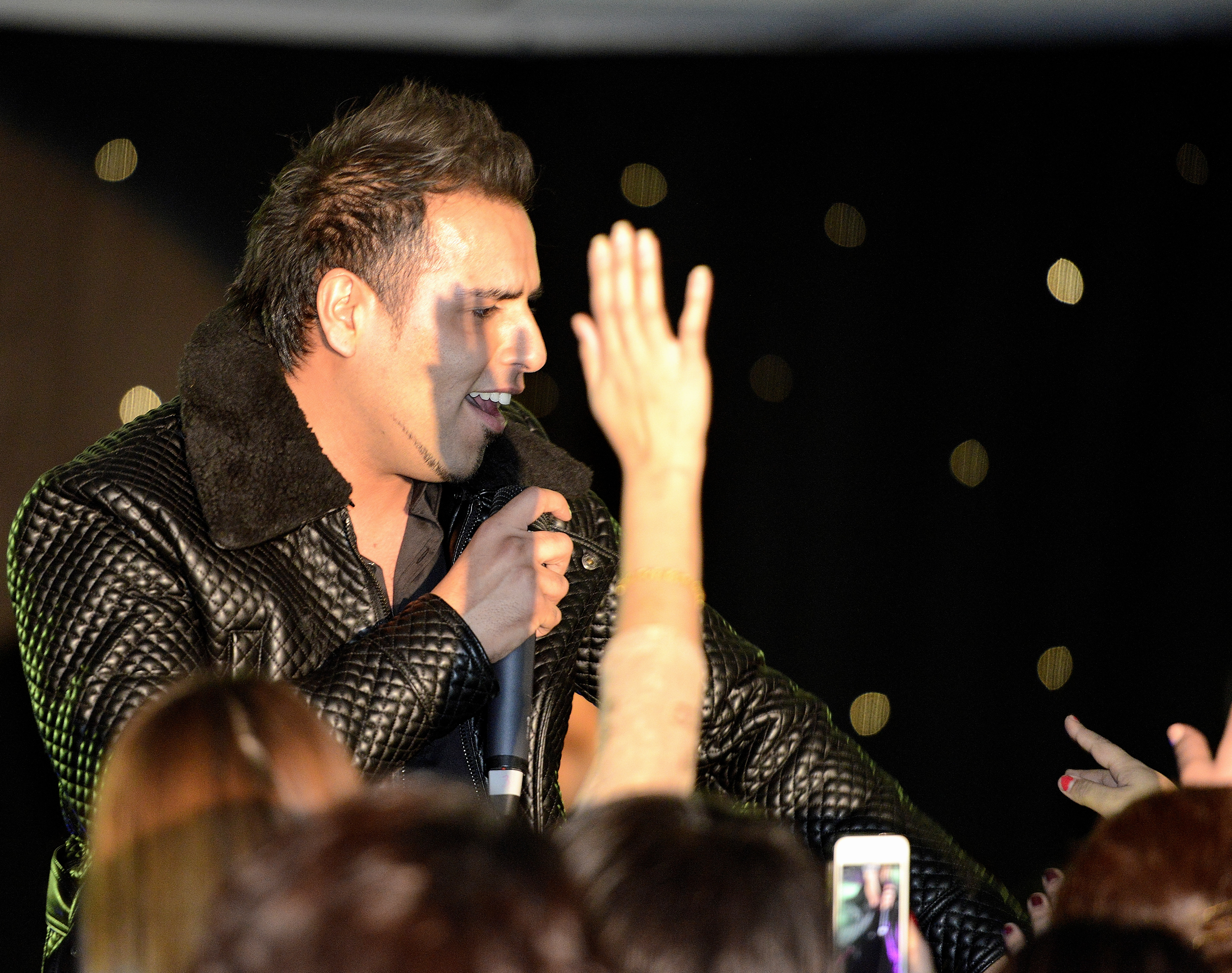
- Dhami in 2013

Background information
- Genres: Bhangra
- Occupation: Singer–songwriter
- Years active: 2007–present
- Labels: Rishi Rich Productions; Sony BMG India
- Spinoff of: Heera Group UK; Palvinder Dhami
- Website: www.hdhami.com

Hartinder Dhami (Punjabi: ਹਰਤਿੰਦਰ ਧਾਮੀ), better known as H-Dhami, is a British Bhangra artist.

== Early life ==
Hartinder Dhami is the son of Palvinder Dhami, the lead singer of the 1980s Bhangra group, Heera Group UK.

== Career ==
Dhami signed in 2007 to Rishi Rich Productions, a joint partnership between Rishi Rich and entertainment entrepreneur Waleed Jahangir. Dhami also signed a deal with Sony BMG India for distribution in India.

Dhami released his debut album Sadke Java in 2008. It includes collaborations with Roach Killa, Anand Sharma Manu, Chaaya and Mumzy Stranger.

In 2010, Dhami was featured on the single "Gereh Kad Dee", the second single from PBN (Panjabi By Nature)'s album Crowd Pleaser. He collaborated with Mumzy Stranger for a Desi-version remix of Stranger's "One More Dance". He also collaborated with the only North-American Bhangra band En Karma on the song "Tere Bina Nahi Nachna". In 2010, he did a Desi mix of Raghav's "So Much" and a remix of Preeya Kalidas' "Shimmy".

In 2019 he won Best Collaboration at Brit Asia TV Music Awards for "Dance", with F1rstman, Juggy D, Mumzy and Raxstar. In the same year he also remixed Heera Group's hit 1988 song Dowain Jaaniya, in which his father Palvinder Dhami sang on.

== Discography ==
=== Albums ===
- 2008: Sadke Java

=== Singles ===
- 2007: "Sadke Java"
- 2008: "Mitran Di Jaan"
- 2008: "Har Gabroo"
- 2012: "Tenu Nachdi Vekna" (Music: PBN) (taken from the album The Story So Far)
- 2016: "Clap It" (PropheC)
- 2017: "Jaan Kad Di Jaave" (Mumzy)
- 2018: "Dance" (F1rstman, Juggy D, Raxstar, Mumzy)
- 2019: "Falling" (Raxstar)
- 2019: "Dowain Janiyaa" (remix of Heera's original song which his father sang in)

== Awards ==
- Won Best Video of Year by Zee TV audience for his debut single "Sadke Java" in 2007.
- Won "Best Newcomer" at the 2008 UK Asian Music Awards
- Won "Best Male Act" at the 2009 UK Asian Music Awards
