= Mumzy Stranger =

British rapper, singer, songwriter and record producer (born 1984)

Mumzy Stranger মুহাম্মদ মুমিথ আহমেদ
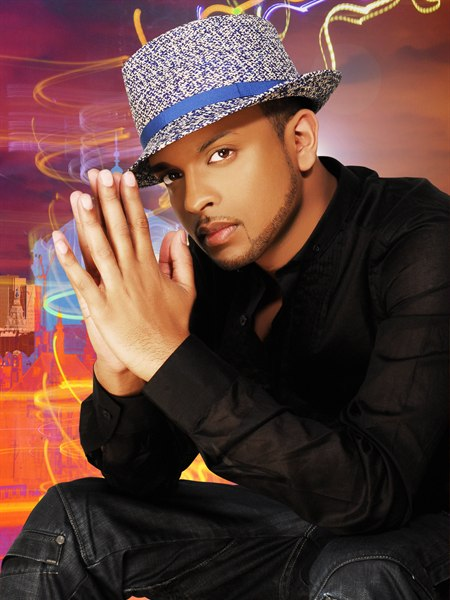

Background information
- Also known as: Mumzy Stranger, SP, Stranger Productions
- Born: Muhammad Mumith Ahmed; 18 January 1984 (age 42); Plaistow, London, England
- Genres: Hip hop; R&B; dancehall
- Occupations: Rapper; singer; songwriter; record producer; dancer
- Instruments: Piano, guitar
- Years active: 2005–present
- Labels: Tiffin Beat Records; Timeless London
- Website: www.mumzystranger.com

Muhammad Mumith Ahmed (Bengali: মুহাম্মদ মুমিথ আহমেদ; born 18 January 1984), known professionally as Mumzy Stranger or his producing name SP (an abbreviation of Stranger Productions), is a British rapper, singer, songwriter and record producer. He made his mainstream recording debut in the summer of 2009 with his debut single "One More Dance" along with follow-up single, "Showgirl". The following year, he released Fly with Me which is the lead single from his debut album, Journey Begins.

He is the first artist of Bangladeshi descent to have entered the mainstream music industry and still remains one of the latest prospects of British-Asian R&B artists in Britain. His style combines reggae, dancehall, R&B and soul, and in different languages including English, Bengali, Punjabi, Hindi and Arabic.

== Early life ==
Mumzy was born in Plaistow, Newham in East London, England on 18 January 1984 to Bangladeshi Muslim parents. He is of Bengali origin and was raised in a traditional Islamic home. He is the second youngest of six in his family.

In 2000, Mumzy started out in the UK garage scene at the age of 16, and was involved in pirate radio until 2003 when he left as he felt like a stranger (from which he derived his stage name).

== Career ==
=== 2005–08: Humble beginnings ===
Mumzy was one of three finalists in BBC Asian Network's Unsung competition in 2005 with his song "Jump Up", after a friend of his submitted his demo tape, which caught the attention of Rishi Rich, a Bhangra-fusion producer who was also one of the judges for the competition. Although he did not win, Mumzy kept in touch with Rishi who would comment on his potential.

Two years later, as a graduate from the University of Westminster, achieving a BA (Hons) in Business Information Technology, and as Rishi Rich's protègè, he released his promo singles, "Let's Party" and "Stranger" as part of the extended play, titled Rishi Rich Productions Presents: The EP which features four tracks in collaboration with H-Dhami and Rishi serving as the producer.

He performed for the UK Asian Music Awards, held at Royal Festival Hall and at the Boishakhi Mela, a concert of Bangladeshi musicians; performing almost annually in both.

=== 2009: Debut single and collaborations ===
Mumzy's debut single "One More Dance" was produced by Rishi Rich and was released in July 2009. The single was set to be titled "One More Chance" but was later changed to "One More Dance", according to Rishi Rich. His second single, "Showgirl", was released in August 2009.

Mumzy is featured on two tracks on The Streets of Bollywood 3, a remix album by Rishi Rich, Hunterz and Kami K which mainly focuses on bringing Indian and urban music together.

Mumzy collaborated with several UK and internationally recognised desi artists, such as H-Dhami, Preeya Kalidas, Abbas Hasan and Malkit Singh.

On 18 November 2010, Ahmed supported Sean Kingston at The O2 Arena.

=== 2010: Debut mixtape and album released ===
Mumzy released his debut mixtape, No Stranger to This, which was put together in the course of seven days and officially released on 11 December, a day before his debut album, Journey Begins.

Mumzy and Stereo Nation are featured on the soundtrack of It's a Wonderful Afterlife. The track is a remix of a hit song by Stereo Nation, "Larl Larl Buleeya". The track is Stranger's debut on a British film soundtrack. He is also featured on the soundtrack of Toonpur Ka Super Hero, making his debut on a Bollywood film soundtrack.

In December 2010, Mumzy's debut album was Journey Begins released on in the UK. Stranger performed songs from the album with a live orchestra to 600 fans and media at a one-off concert on 18 December at Stratford Circus in Stratford, London. The album's lead single is "Fly With Me", produced by himself at his home studio. The single debuted at number 15 on the UK Asian Download Chart and stayed in the top 40 for more than 17 weeks but dropped off the chart at week 18. There are several remixes of "Fly With Me", a Grime Mix featuring Flo Dan, Gods Gift, KID & Roly; a Rishi Rich Kulcha Mix and a Bangla Mix featuring SH8S. Stranger's fourth and final single from the album is "Spaceman" featuring Wiley produced by chart topping producer Steel Banglez.

=== 2011–12: Award nominations and Stranger Family ===
At the UK Asian Music Awards' Nominations Party held at the West Midlands' super-club Gatecrasher, in Birmingham on 1 February, Mumzy was nominated for 4 awards, Best Album (Journey Begins), Best Male Act, Best Urban Act and Best Video (Fly With Me); the most for any solo act at the UK Asian Music Awards 2011. He ended up winning Best Urban Act.

After the release of his debut album, he released his new promotional single titled "Mama Used to Say", a collaboration with Grammy-Award winning British R&B singer, Junior, which was released on 10 March. Stranger performed the single at the UK AMA with Junior.

On 8 April 2011, Mumzy's single "Heartbreaker" was released as a free download.

Much like his mentor Rishi Rich, Mumzy collaborated with his new protègè and the first addition to the Stranger Family, Junai Kaden, on the track "Aaja Mere Naal". The track is Junai Kaden's debut single and produced by Mumzy himself. The single was released on 14 April 2011 and entered the UK Asian Download Chart at no. 7, making it his very first top 10 single.

In 2012, Mumzy officially launched Stranger Family, a music collective with Junai Kaden, Char Avell, Tasha Tah and Ramee. The group released their debut single, "Ghetto Refix" in 2012, which was a new version of Kaden's track "Ghetto" from his album From Me to You.

In November 2012, Stranger Family was scheduled to tour the UK alongside Canadian-South Asian group Culture Shock in the XOXO Tour, with the two groups even collaborating on a single, "XOXO", for promotion of the tour. However, due to poor ticket sales and issues regarding managing from Tiffin Beats Records, the tour was cancelled and would eventually lead to the breaking up of the Stranger Family.

=== 2013–17: Independent success ===
Mumzy is the featured artist on Nafees' song titled "Sazaa", which went to number 1 on The Official Asian Download Chart in its first week of release, the song was written by Yazz Nasir. He has also been to India with Tasha Tah to feature in a song called "Kurbaan". The track was made before, but the song was remade for Bollywood and the video has been shown on B4U Music.

In 2015, as a crossover collaboration between the UK and the U.S., Mumzy featured on two promotional tracks with Adam Saleh and Sheikh Akbar (formerly known as TrueStoryASA), titled Diamond Girl and the other (without Sheikh Akbar), titled Tomorrow's Another Day.

After leaving his previous label, Tiffin Beats Records, Mumzy released a new record, "Love Comfort", as part of his new label he created, Timeless London.

Similar to how Mumzy launched artists as part of his Stranger Family collective in 2012, Mumzy began launching new artists with his comeback with "Love Comfort". "Love Comfort" featured himself and a new female artist he signed, Shayma, and was produced by Lyan Roze, a producer signed to Timeless London who would go on to produce many of Mumzy's future singles. Mumzy then signed Rupika Vaidya, a Sweden-based singer, and was a featured artist on her debut single, "Karle Manmani" in 2015. In 2016, Mumzy signed Nish, who featured in the Bangla Refix of Ahmed's single "Jaan Atki", which was produced by Lyan Roze and would go on to become No. 1 on the UK ITunes World Chart. In late 2015, Mumzy Stranger featured in Iksy's parody music video alongside Corner Shop Show, Humza Arshad, Bengali Blitz, Puremovements and Char Avell.

=== 2018–present: Vertigo and new projects ===
In March 2018, he featured in Humza Arshad's parody of the viral Nike advertisement, known as "Nothing Beats A Londoner", featuring notable Londoners from underrepresented minorities such as Juggy D, H-Dhami, Tasha Tah, Sevaqk, Bobby Friction, Raxstar, Tez Ilyas, Arjun, Steel Banglez, Char Avell, Jay Sean, Corner Shop Show (Islah Abdur-Rahman, Michael Truong, Can Snatchy Kabadayi) and Naughty Boy.

Mumzy Stranger was featured on Dutch-Pakistani F1rstman's collaborative single "Dance" alongside fellow UK South Asian artists Raxstar, H-Dhami & Juggy D. The single, described as starting a "global desi movement", became successful and would go on to feature on Spotify's Global X playlist and win Best Collaboration at the 2019 BritAsia TV Music Awards. The five would also later release a remix featuring Arjun to coincide with the 2019 Cricket World Cup with new lyrics to match the cricket theme.

Mumzy featured on Nish's debut album Identity, co-producing and singing on the lead single "Love Lost" and producing the song "Maa Baba". After Identity, Mumzy was featured on Master-D's summer single "Tumi Jaio Na", both of which are considered part of an "urban Bangla movement".

On 18 October 2019, Mumzy released his second studio album, Vertigo. The album, with hip hop and R&B songs in multiple languages, features Mumzy's previous collaborators Nish, Raxstar, Arjun, F1rstman, and Lyan as well as J Riley, Snap Capone, Corleone and Inkra Dabelle.

In 2020, Mumzy Stranger was featured on "Gallan Kardi", a remix of Jazzy B's hit song "Dil Luteya", from the Bollywood film Jawaani Jaaneman.

In July 2020, Mumzy's 'Habibti' reached #4 on the Billboard 'Top Triller Global' list.

== Charity work ==
Mumzy is an ambassador for Newham Council's anti-violence campaign to prevent gun and knife crime.

On 29 August 2010, Mumzy took part in the Sky Ride Leicester, a free, family-orientated and fun traffic-free mass participation cycling event in Leicester, England.

For Ramadan 2018, Mumzy took part in Barnardo's FastForADay campaign.

== Awards and nominations ==
| Year | Award | Category | Result |
|---|---|---|---|
| 2009 | Urban Music Awards | Best UK Asian Act | Won |
| 2010 | BritAsia TV Music Awards | Best Urban Asian Act | Won |
| 2011 | UK Asian Music Awards | Best Album (Journey Begins) | Nominated |
| 2011 | UK Asian Music Awards | Best Male Act | Nominated |
| 2011 | UK Asian Music Awards | Best Urban Act | Won |
| 2011 | UK Asian Music Awards | Best Video ("Fly With Me") | Nominated |
| 2014 | BritAsia TV Music Awards | Non-Asian Music Producer | Won |
| 2017 | Urban Music Awards | Artist of the Year (Asia) | Won |
| 2019 | BritAsia TV Music Awards | Best Collaboration ("Dance" by F1rstman, Juggy D, H Dhami, Mumzy and Raxstar) | Won |

== Discography ==
=== Albums ===
| Album Title | Album details | Peak chart positions | Certifications |
|---|---|---|---|
| Journey Begins | Released: 12 December 2010; Formats: CD, Digital download | | |
| Vertigo | Released: 18 October 2019; Formats: Digital download | | |

=== Mixtapes ===
- MixTape (DesiDrop.com exclusive, collection of Mumzy's promo songs) (2008)
- No Stranger to This (hosted by DJ Limelight) (2010)
- Now Or Never (mini mixtape, co-produced with JUSZONIN) (February 2015)
- 7even (co-produced with JUSZONIN) (2016)

=== Extended plays ===
- Rishi Rich Productions Presents: The EP (with H-Dhami) (2008)
- 5 Reasons (2020)

== Videography ==
=== Music videos ===
| Year | Song | Artist | Album | Label | Media | Notes |
|---|---|---|---|---|---|---|
| 2008 | "Sadke Java" | H-Dhami | Sadke Java | Moviebox | Moviebox | Cameo |
| 2009 | "One More Dance" | Mumzy Stranger | | Tiffin Beats Records | Tiffin Beats Records | directed by Phil Hawkins/Box Bot |
| 2009 | "Showgirl" | Mumzy Stranger | | Tiffin Beats Records | Tiffin Beats Records | |
| 2009 | "It Can Only Be Love" / "City Guy" | Rishi Rich & Mumzy Stranger | The Streets of Bollywood 3 | Moviebox | Moviebox | |
| 2009 | "Manjave" | Sophie Choudry ft. Mumzy Stranger | Sound of Sophie | | | |
| 2010 | "Fly With Me" | Mumzy Stranger | Journey Begins | Tiffin Beats Records | Tiffin Beats Records | directed by Orson Nava |
| 2010 | "Shimmy" | Preeya Kalidas ft. Mumzy Stranger | Constant Craving | | | |
| 2010 | "Sona" | Abbas Hasan ft. Mumzy Stranger | | | | |
| 2011 | "Nach Billo" | Malkit Singh ft. Mumzy Stranger | Billo Rani | Moviebox | Moviebox | |
| 2011 | "Ha Karde" | Goldkartz ft. Mumzy Stranger | 24 Karaatz | | X1Film | |
| 2011 | "Heartbreaker" | Mumzy Stranger | | Desi Box | | Desi Box exclusive track |
| 2011 | "Aaja Mere Naal" | Junai Kaden ft. Mumzy Stranger | From Me to You | Tiffin Beats Records | Tiffin Beats Records | |
| 2012 | "Ghetto Refix" | Junai Kaden ft. Mumzy Stranger, Char Avell, Tasha Tah & Ramee | | Tiffin Beats Records | Tiffin Beats Records | |
| 2013 | "Runaway" | Mumzy Stranger | | Tiffin Beats Records | Tiffin Beats Records | |
| 2013 | "Let Me In" | Salique ft. Mumzy Stranger | | Black Label | | |
| 2013 | "Sazaa" | Nafees ft. Mumzy Stranger | | | | |
| 2014 | "Love Comfort" | Mumzy Stranger | | Timeless London | Timeless Media | Directed by Mumzy Stranger & Humza Arshad |
| 2014 | "Get to Know" | Mumzy Stranger | | Timeless London | Timeless Media | Directed by Humza Arshad |
| 2014 | "Kuriya" | Rameet Kaur | | | | |
| 2014 | "Got Me Singing" | Raxstar ft. Mumzy Stranger | | | | Directed by Hasinth Pathirana |
| 2015 | "Ash Kardi" | Mumzy Stranger | | Timeless London | Timeless Media | |
| 2015 | "Pray" | Mumzy Stranger | | Timeless London | Timeless Media | |
| 2015 | "Diamond Girl" | Adam Saleh and Sheikh Akbar | | TrueStoryASA | TrueStoryASA | Directed by Waz Islam & Sachin Patel |
| 2015 | "Circles" | Mumzy Stranger | | Timeless London | Timeless Media | |
| 2015 | "Tomorrow's Another Day" | Adam Saleh | | Naz Promotions | Naz Promotions | |
| 2015 | "One Last Time Lyan Roze Mix" | Stevie Hoang & Mumzy Stranger | | Stevie Hoang | Stevie Hoang | |
| 2016 | "Jaan Atki" | Mumzy Stranger | | Timeless London | Timeless Media | Directed by Waz |
| 2016 | "Won't Leave" | Char Avell ft. Mumzy Stranger | | Timeless London XLVI Records | Timeless Media Avell Pictures | |
| 2016 | "Diamond Jewel" | Mumzy Stranger | | Timeless London | Timeless Media | Directed by Sachin Patel |
| 2016 | "Diamond Jewel (Bangla Remix)" | Mumzy Stranger | | Timeless London | Timeless Media | Directed by Sachin Patel |
| 2016 | "Let's Make Love" | Mumzy Stranger & JusZonin | | Timeless London | Timeless Media | |
| 2017 | "Manja" | Nish | | Timeless London | Timeless Media | Cameo |
| 2017 | "Turn Me On" | Nish ft. Mumzy Stranger | | Timeless London | Timeless Media | Directed by Sachin Patel |
| 2017 | "Turn Me On (Remix) | Nish ft. Mumzy Stranger & Raxstar | | Timeless London | Timeless Media | Directed by Sachin Patel |
| 2017 | "Come My Way" | Mumzy Stranger | | Timeless London | Timeless Media | Directed by Rafi Rahman Co-directed by Raju Shamsher |
| 2017 | "Jaan Kad Di Jaave" | Mumzy Stranger ft. H-Dhami & LYAN | | Timeless London | Timeless Media | Directed by Sachin Patel & Rafi Rahman |
| 2017 | "Umaana" | Mumzy Stranger | | Timeless London | Timeless Media | Directed by Sachin Patel |
| 2018 | "Dominoes" | Mumzy Stranger | | Timeless London | Timeless Media | Directed by Nish & Sachin Patel |
| 2018 | "Love Lost" | Nish ft. Mumzy Stranger & LYAN | Identity | Timeless London Backhouse LDN | Timeless Media | Directed by Sachin Patel |
| 2018 | "Lights Low" | Mumzy Stranger | | Timeless London | Timeless Media | Directed by Sachin Patel Co-directed by Raju Shamsher |
| 2018 | "Yaara" | Rupika ft. Mumzy Stranger & Nish | | Timeless London | Timeless Media | Directed by Sachin Patel |
| 2018 | "Dance" | F1rstman ft. H-Dhami, Mumzy Stranger, Raxstar & Juggy D | | At F1rst Music | At F1rst Music | Directed by Denis Majstorovic |
| 2019 | "Know You Wanna" | Mumzy Stranger | | Timeless London | Timeless Media | Directed by Sachin Patel |
| 2019 | "Tumi Jaio Na" | Master-D ft. Mumzy Stranger | | Qinetic Music Bilz Music | Qinetic Music | Directed by PeeZee |
| 2019 | "Xoss" | Nish | | Backhouse LDN | Timeless Media | Cameo |
| 2019 | "Dil Luteya" | Mumzy Stranger | Vertigo | Timeless London | Timeless Media | Directed by Zubby and Zak Timol |
| 2019 | "Broken" | Mumzy Stranger ft. Arjun | Vertigo | Timeless London | Timeless Media | Directed by Capone |
| 2019 | "Hold Up" | Mumzy Stranger ft. Nish & LYAN | Vertigo | Timeless London | Qinetic Music | Directed by Donovan |
| 2019 | "Raani" | Mumzy Stranger | Vertigo | Timeless London | Timeless Media | Directed by Nish |
| 2020 | "Stay With Me" | Mumzy Stranger ft. Inkra Dabelle | Vertigo | Timeless London | Qinetic Music | Directed by Hector Toro |
| 2020 | "Tell Me" | Mumzy Stranger | Vertigo | Timeless London | Timeless Media | Directed by Sachin Patel |
| 2020 | "Lean On Me" | Mumzy Stranger | | Timeless London | Timeless Media | Directed by Tahmid Chowdhury |
| 2020 | "Habibti" | Mumzy Stranger & DJ LYAN | | Timeless London | Timeless Media | Directed by Waz |
| 2020 | "Jugni 2.0" | Kanika Kapoor ft. Mumzy Stranger & DJ LYAN | | Zee Music Company | Zee Music Company | Directed by Luke Biggins |
| 2020 | "Garage Billo" | Mumzy Stranger | 5 Reasons | Timeless London | Timeless Media | Directed by Sachin Patel |
| 2020 | "Korbona" | Mumzy Stranger ft. Nish | 5 Reasons | Timeless London | Timeless Media | Directed by Sachin Patel |
| 2020 | "Faith" | Mumzy Stranger | 5 Reasons | Timeless London | Timeless Media | Directed by Sachin Patel |
| 2021 | "No Going Back" | Mumzy Stranger ft. Dixi | 5 Reasons | Timeless London | Timeless Media | Directed by Sachin Patel |
| 2021 | "Thought It Was Love" | Mumzy Stranger | 5 Reasons | Timeless London | Timeless Media | Directed by Sachin Patel |
| 2021 | "Lost" | Rishi Rich, Mumzy Stranger & Jagtar | 3 Chapters | Break the Noise Records | Break the Noise Records | Directed by Sachin Patel |

== See also ==
- British Bangladeshi
- List of British Bangladeshis
