= Selfiee =

2023 Indian film by Raj Mehta

- Theatrical release poster
- Directed by: Raj Mehta
- Written by: Rishabh Sharma
- Story by: Sachy
- Based on: Driving Licence by Lal Jr.
- Produced by: Hiroo Yash Johar; Aruna Bhatia; Supriya Menon; Karan Johar; Prithviraj Sukumaran; Apoorva Mehta; Listin Stephen
- Starring: Akshay Kumar; Emraan Hashmi
- Cinematography: Rajeev Ravi
- Edited by: Ritesh Soni
- Music by: Songs: Anu Malik; Tanishk Bagchi; Yo Yo Honey Singh; The PropheC; Lijo George-DJ Chetas; Vikram Montrose; Aditya Yadav; Tarun; Background Score: John Stewart Eduri
- Production companies: Dharma Productions; Cape of Good Films; Prithviraj Productions; Magic Frames
- Distributed by: Star Studios
- Release date: 24 February 2023
- Running time: 148 minutes
- Country: India
- Language: Hindi
- Budget: est. ₹100 crore
- Box office: ₹23.63 crore

Selfiee is a 2023 Indian Hindi-language comedy-drama film directed by Raj Mehta and produced by Dharma Productions, Magic Frames, Prithviraj Productions and Cape of Good Films. The film stars Akshay Kumar and Emraan Hashmi.

A remake of the 2019 Malayalam film, Driving Licence, the film revolves around a rivalry between an RTO Inspector and a prominent actor. The film was officially announced in January 2022, while principal photography commenced in March 2022. It was theatrically released on 24 February 2023. The film received mixed reviews from critics, and was a box-office disaster, earning ₹23.63 crore (US$2.5 million) worldwide.

== Plot ==
Vijay Kumar, a popular film actor, plans to leave for the United States, for the birth of his child abroad via surrogacy. With a week left in the pregnancy, he needs to obtain a driver's license for a pending shoot for his upcoming film Falak Tak, which has already incurred a budget overrun and is taking place in Bhopal. The film's producer cannot wait for Vijay to return from the US, so they arrange for a local RTO Inspector, Om Prakash Aggarwal, to expedite the process, giving Vijay his licence while skipping required tests. Om and his son are diehard fans of Vijay, and Om's only request is for Vijay to take a selfie with him and his son in return.

Vijay discretely arrives at the local RTO, but is shocked to find it swarming with reporters, who catch him on-camera, driving without a valid licence. Following a private showdown between Vijay and Om wherein the former heavily berates the latter in his son's presence, the situation escalates into a national scandal involving Vijay and Om, who decides his son's respect for him cannot be any lesser than their own love for the star; amidst this, Vijay's wife, Naina, leaves for the US as he delays his trip to deal with this mess. Vijay and Om publicly trade insults, and Om challenges Vijay to obtain his licence by due process. To appease his producer, who cannot delay his film any more, Vijay agrees. He suggests the test be televised and broadcast live, to allay suspicions that he is peddling influence.

The test has three components - a theoretical test, followed by two driving tests the next day. For TV audiences, the theoretical test is made into a live Q&A, with Om interrogating Vijay ‘on-air’ about rules of the road. Vijay scrapes by, but his driving tests are delayed by Om for petty reasons. Vijay purchases a car from a driving school to clear the first driving test, but Om announces Vijay will have to come back for the last test, as all appointments are taken. Not wishing to miss his child's birth, Vijay publicly forgoes getting his licence. He offers to reimburse the film producer for his losses as well.

An angry mob of Vijay's fans attacks Om, forcing Vijay to pull him into his car to save him from being lynched. En route to pick up Om's family, lest they be attacked as well, both Vijay and Om apologise to each other. It is discovered that a rival actor, Suraj, orchestrated an occult attack on Om's family, while the local corporator, Vimla, was the one who gave away details of his visit, both seeking a boost to their respective careers. Their feud now settled, with Suraj and Vimla being reprimanded for their actions, Om's family take a selfie with Vijay in his car, and Om gives him his licence. His career and reputation restored, Vijay flies off to the US to witness his child's birth.

== Cast ==
- Akshay Kumar as Vijay Kumar
- Emraan Hashmi as RTO Inspector Om Prakash Aggarwal
- Nushrratt Bharuccha as Minty Aggarwal, Om's wife
- Diana Penty as Naina Kumar, Vijay's wife
- Abhimanyu Singh as Suraj Diwan
- Adah Sharma as Meera
- Mahesh Thakur as Naveen
- Meghna Malik as Corporator Vimla Tiwari
- Akashdeep Sabir as Dheeraj Jaiswal
- Kusha Kapila as Tara
- Jacqueline Fernandez as dancer in song "Deewane" (special appearance)
- Mrunal Thakur as dancer in song "Kudiyee Ni Teri" (special appearance)
- Yo Yo Honey Singh as himself in song "Kudi Chamkili" (special appearance)

== Production ==
The film was announced in January 2022 with a motion poster by Dharma Productions. Principal photography commenced in March 2022 in Mumbai and wrapped in December 2022.

Selfiee became the first Dharma film to be shot and based in Bhopal, following the announcement of shooting-friendly initiatives by the Madhya Pradesh government. It is also the second Star Studios film to be shot and based in Bhopal after Panga (2020), and to observe a theatrical release after Brahmāstra: Part One – Shiva (2022).

== Music ==
The music of the film is composed by Anu Malik, Tanishk Bagchi, Yo Yo Honey Singh, The PropheC, Lijo George-DJ Chetas, Vikram Montrose, Aditya Yadav and Tarun. The first song, "Main Khiladi" was released on 1 February 2023. It is the remixed version of the title song from the 1994 blockbuster, Main Khiladi Tu Anari. The second single titled "Kudiyee Ni Teri" was released on 9 February 2023. The third single titled "Kudi Chamkeeli" was released on 19 February 2023.

Selfiee

Soundtrack album by Tanishk Bagchi, Anu Malik, Yo Yo Honey Singh, The PropheC, Vikram Montrose, Lijo George-DJ Chetas, Aditya Yadav & Tarun
- Released: 2023
- Recorded: 2022–2023
- Genre: Feature film soundtrack
- Length: 26:51
- Label: Play DMF

Track listing
No.	Title	Lyrics	Music	Singer(s)	Length
1.	"Main Khiladi 2.0"	Maya Govind	Anu Malik, Tanishk Bagchi	Udit Narayan, Abhijeet Bhattacharya	3:07
2.	"Kudiyee Ni Teri"	The PropheC Tanishk Bagchi	Tanishk Bagchi, The PropheC	The PropheC, Zahrah S Khan	3:39
3.	"Kudi Chamkeeli"	Yo Yo Honey Singh	Yo Yo Honey Singh	Yo Yo Honey Singh	4:07
4.	"Selfiee Title Song"	Shabbir Ahmed, Azeem Dayani	Lijo George-DJ Chetas	Nakash Aziz, Akasa Singh, Nikhita Gandhi, Lijo George-DJ Chetas	3:34
5.	"Sher"	Abhinav Shekhar	Vikram Montrose	MC Square	2:36
6.	"Selfiee Theme"		Lijo George	Nakash Aziz	0:57
7.	"Selfiee (Aggressive Theme)"		Tanishk Bagchi		2:03
8.	"Vaar"		Vikram Montrose	Abhinav Shekhar, Ali Aslam Shah	2:51
9.	"Deewane"	Kunaal Vermaa	Aditya Yadav, Tanishk Bagchi	Aditya Yadav, Stebin Ben	3:57
Total length:					26:51

== Release ==
At a promotional event for the film, Akshay Kumar clicked 184 selfies with fans in three minutes, breaking the Guinness World Record for the most number of selfies clicked in three minutes.

=== Theatrical ===
The film released on 24 February 2023.

=== Home media ===
The film was premiered on Disney+ Hotstar on 21 April 2023.

== Reception ==
=== Critical response ===
On the review aggregator website Rotten Tomatoes, 18% of 11 critics' reviews are positive, with an average rating of 4.7/10.

The Times of India gave the film 3.5 out of 5 stars and wrote "Overall, Selfiee is an easy-breezy watch, with some good performances and several laugh-out-loud moments. If you're looking for a rib-tickling comedy over the weekend, this one could be a good pick." Bollywood Hungama gave 3 out of 5 stars and wrote " SELFIEE works due to the plot, direction, dialogues and faceoff between the actors. At the box office, the film will have to rely on strong word of mouth and spot bookings to make a mark."

Zinia Bandyopadhyay of India Today gave 3 out of 5 stars and wrote "Akshay Kumar-Emraan Hashmi roll out a good remake that's genuinely fun". Monika Rawal Kukreja of Hindustan Times wrote "Akshay Kumar gets up, close and personal with his superstardom in this mass entertainer". Anna MM Vetticad of Firstpost gave 2.25 out of 5 stars and wrote "A reasonably entertaining Akshay Kumar starrer after a long time".

=== Box office ===
As of 16 March 2023, the film has grossed ₹20.06 crore (US$2.1 million) in India and ₹3.57 crore (US$370,000) overseas for a worldwide gross collection of ₹23.63 crore (US$2.5 million).
