= Journey Begins =

Studio album by Mumzy Stranger
- Released: 12 December 2010
- Recorded: 2009 – 2010
- Genre: R&B; hip hop; bashment; reggae
- Length: 51:54
- Language: English
- Label: Tiffin Beats
- Producer: Mumzy Stranger; Rax Timyr; Rishi Rich; Diligent; Steel Banglez; THE ALiBI; Vee

Singles from Journey Begins
- 1. "Fly with Me" Released: 10 October 2010

Journey Begins is the debut studio album by British-Bangladeshi singer Mumzy Stranger, released on 12 December 2010 by Tiffin Beats Records.

== Background ==
Journey Begins features a mix of dancehall, reggae, bashment, hip hop and R&B and consists of tracks produced by Mumzy Stranger, Rishi Rich and Steel Banglez. The album also features a collaboration with Wiley.

== Singles ==
The first single from Journey Begins is "One More Dance". It topped the UK Asian Charts and was the first mainstream music single released by an artist of Bangladeshi descent. The second single "Fly with Me" debuted at number 15 on the UK Asian Download Chart and stayed in the top 40 for more than 17 weeks but dropped off the chart at week 18. There are several remixes of "Fly with Me", a Grime Mix featuring Flo Dan, Gods Gift, KID & Roly; a Rishi Rich Kulcha Mix and a Bangla Mix featuring SH8S. Stranger's fourth and final single from the album is "Spaceman" featuring Wiley.

== Promotion ==
Journey Begins was released on 12 December 2010 by Tiffin Beats Records. Stranger performed songs from the album with a live orchestra to 600 fans and media at a one-off concert on 18 December at Stratford Circus in Stratford, London.

== Critical response ==
Professional ratings
Review scores
Source	Rating
DesiHits	3/5 stars

DesiHits rated Journey Begins 3/5 and commented, "Despite high expectations and many memorable collaborations and features, "Journey Begins" doesn't impress us. But we know how what a great singer Mumzy Stranger is and we are hoping he snatches them awards."

== Track listing ==
No.	Title	Writer(s)	Producer(s)	Length
1.	"Fly with Me"	Mumzy Stranger	Mumzy Stranger, Rax Timyr	3:53
2.	"Superwoman"	Mumzy Stranger	Rax Timyr	3:33
3.	"Drop It"	Mumzy Stranger, THE ALiBI	Diligent	3:35
4.	"Positive Vibe"	THE ALiBI	Diligent	3:58
5.	"Spaceman" (featuring Wiley)	Mumzy Stranger	Steel Banglez	4:38
6.	"Schizophrenic"	Mumzy Stranger, THE ALiBI	Diligent	3:23
7.	"Left with None"	Mumzy Stranger	Diligent	3:22
8.	"Rainfall"	Mumzy Stranger	Diligent, THE ALiBI	4:01
9.	"Can I Love Again"	Mumzy Stranger	Mumzy Stranger, THE ALiBI	4:10
10.	"Genesis" (featuring Yasmin)	Mumzy Stranger	Rax Timyr, Mumzy Stranger	3:32
11.	"Promises"	Mumzy Stranger	Rishi Rich, Rax Timyr	4:58
12.	"Fatal Attraction"	Mumzy Stranger	Rax Timyr	4:33
13.	"Sexy Mama/Take Away My Breath (Bonus Snippet)"	Mumzy Stranger	Rax Timyr, THE ALiBI	4:18
Total length:				60:45

== Awards and nominations ==
Year	Award	Category	Result
2010	UK Asian Music Awards	Best Album	Nominated
