= Jasmin Walia =

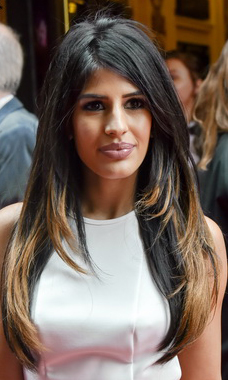
- Walia in 2015

Background information
- Born: 23 May 1990 (age 36); Essex, England
- Genre: Pop
- Occupations: Singer and television personality
- Years active: 2012–present
- Labels: T-Series; Virgin EMI
- Website: www.jasminwalia.me

Jasmin Walia (born 23 May 1990) is a British singer and former television personality. She rose to prominence in 2017 with the single "Bom Diggy" with Zack Knight, which peaked at number one on the BBC Asian Network's Official Asian Music Chart. Walia was nominated for the Mirchi Music Award for Upcoming Female Vocalist of The Year at the 11th Mirchi Music Awards for the song, and it was also nominated for the Mirchi Music Award for Song of The Year.

== Career ==
=== Childhood singing and career beginnings ===
Walia started singing at the age of around 7–8, and was the first in her family to sing. While watching television, she used to imitate the actors in the lounge. She said in a Q&A session, "I used to sit there every Saturday night, performing "Over The Rainbow" to my dad, and I think that he picked up the fact that I loved singing and enrolled me into singing classes." She demonstrated a vehemence for stage at a very young age. She started attending theatre school at the age of 10. She used to listen to Indian music and watch Bollywood movies.

She did four A levels and got three As and a B, and subsequently applied to the University of Cambridge to study philosophy, but did not get accepted. She worked for Natwest Bank as a Customer Adviser for a few years. She also enrolled with the ACCA for an accountancy course, but later decided to drop out.

=== 2012–2015: TOWIE and The X Factor ===
Walia first worked as an extra in the British reality TV series, The Only Way Is Essex in 2010, and was promoted to a full cast member in 2012. She was part of series 7–14 (September 2012 – April 2015). While series 7 to 12 were released by ITV2, ITVBe has the original release rights for series 13 and 14. She also recorded The Only Way Is Las Vegas, with shooting beginning in September 2013.

She started a YouTube channel in February 2014 and began uploading song covers alongside artists including Zack Knight, intens-ti and Ollie Green Music. Popular tracks like "Rather Be", "Dark Horse" and "All of Me" were among her first covers.

In September 2014, Walia auditioned for the eleventh series of the singing talent show, The X Factor, but all four judges rejected her, leaving her devastated. She said in an interview, "I was completely shattered. You're waiting around, getting more and more nervous watching everyone around you."

In May 2015, she confirmed that she would be quitting the TOWIE show on Twitter: "I can confirm that I am taking a break from filming #TOWIE but would like to thank everyone involved with the show, Producers, Crew & Cast x [sic]."

Walia then appeared in the British television show Desi Rascals 2, streamed by Sky One from July to September 2015. The show also featured her then-boyfriend Ross Worswick. Before shooting for the show began, she said, "This is the opportunity I've been looking for that will allow me to explore my cultural roots whilst still maintaining all the glitz and glamour that I love." The structured reality TV series delved deeper into the lives of a diverse set of West Londoners in their quests to fulfil their dreams and overcome challenges.

=== 2016 to present: Career as a singer ===
Walia released her first single, "Dum Dee Dee Dum", in April 2016 as a collaboration with Zack Knight. The song, written by Knight, P Cruz Michaela, and Reesa/Shide, and composed by Zack Knight and P Cruz, was released via T-Series. Her second single, "Girl Like Me", was released on her YouTube channel in November 2016 and was made available for digital download on iTunes, Google Play, Spotify and Amazon Music. The track was written by Zack Knight and Harley Nixon, and the music video was directed by Roger Russell.

In December 2016, Walia appeared in the theatre show Aladdin at the Aylesbury Waterside Theatre alongside Michelle Collins.

She partnered with T-Series once again in March 2017 for the release of her third song, "Temple". Composed by Zack Knight, Walia and Knight wrote the song. The music video was directed by Luke Biggins and Roger Russell. In May 2017, Walia released her fourth single, "Go Down". Its music video was shot in Dubai. Saavn LLC released her fifth song, "Bom Diggy", with her long-term music partner, Zack Knight, who also wrote and composed the track. The music video, published in August 2017 on Knight's official YouTube channel, was directed by Knight and Luke Biggins. It was shot in the London nightclub, Café de Paris. The video received over 8,630,000 YouTube views in less than two months.

She debuted in Bollywood with the song "Bom Diggy" in the 2018 film Sonu Ke Titu Ki Sweety. The song peaked at number one on the Indian pop charts for several weeks.

In July 2020, Walia became the first British Indian female singer to be featured on the Times Square Billboard - One Times Square - in New York City for her single, "Want Some".

== In the media ==
Walia was named in the Top 50 Sexiest Asian Women List by Eastern Eye in 2014 alongside Zayn Malik and 2015 with Sanaya Irani.

== Discography ==
=== Singles ===
Year	Track Name	label	Ref.
2016	"Dum Dee Dum"	T-Series	
2016	"Girl Like Me"	T-Series	
2017	"Bom Diggy" (with Zack Knight)	Saavn	
2017	"Temple"	T-Series	
2017	"Go Down	BMI	
2018	"Bom Diggy Diggy" (for Sonu Ke Titu Ki Sweety)	T-Series	
2018	"Sahara"	Revolve	
2019	"Mañana"	Virgin EMI	
2020	"Want Some"	Virgin EMI	

== Television ==
Year	Name	Role	Notes	Ref
2005	Casualty	Jessica Farquer		
2009	The Bill	Aisha Khatri		
2010	Doctors	Sunita Desai		
2010–2015	The Only Way Is Essex	Herself		
2014	The X Factor	Contestant		
2015	Desi Rascals	Herself		
2017	Dinner Date	Contestant		
