= Jake Paul vs Tommy Fury =

2023 professional crossover boxing match

The Truth
- Date: February 26, 2023
- Venue: Diriyah Arena, Diriyah, Saudi Arabia

Tale of the tape
Boxer	(United States) Jake Paul	(United Kingdom) Tommy Fury
Nickname	The Problem Child	TNT
Hometown	Cleveland, Ohio, U.S.	Manchester, England
Pre-fight record	6–0 (4 KO)	8–0 (4 KO)
Age	26 years, 1 month	23 years, 9 months
Height	6 ft 1 in (1.85 m)	6 ft 0 in (1.83 m)
Weight	183.6 lb (83 kg)	184.5 lb (84 kg)
Style	Orthodox	Orthodox

Result
- Fury wins via 8-round split decision (74–75, 76–73, 76–73)

Jake Paul vs Tommy Fury, billed as The Truth, was a cruiserweight professional crossover boxing match contested between American YouTuber Jake Paul and English professional boxer Tommy Fury. The bout took place at Diriyah Arena in Diriyah, Saudi Arabia on 26 February 2023. Fury won by split decision.

== Background ==
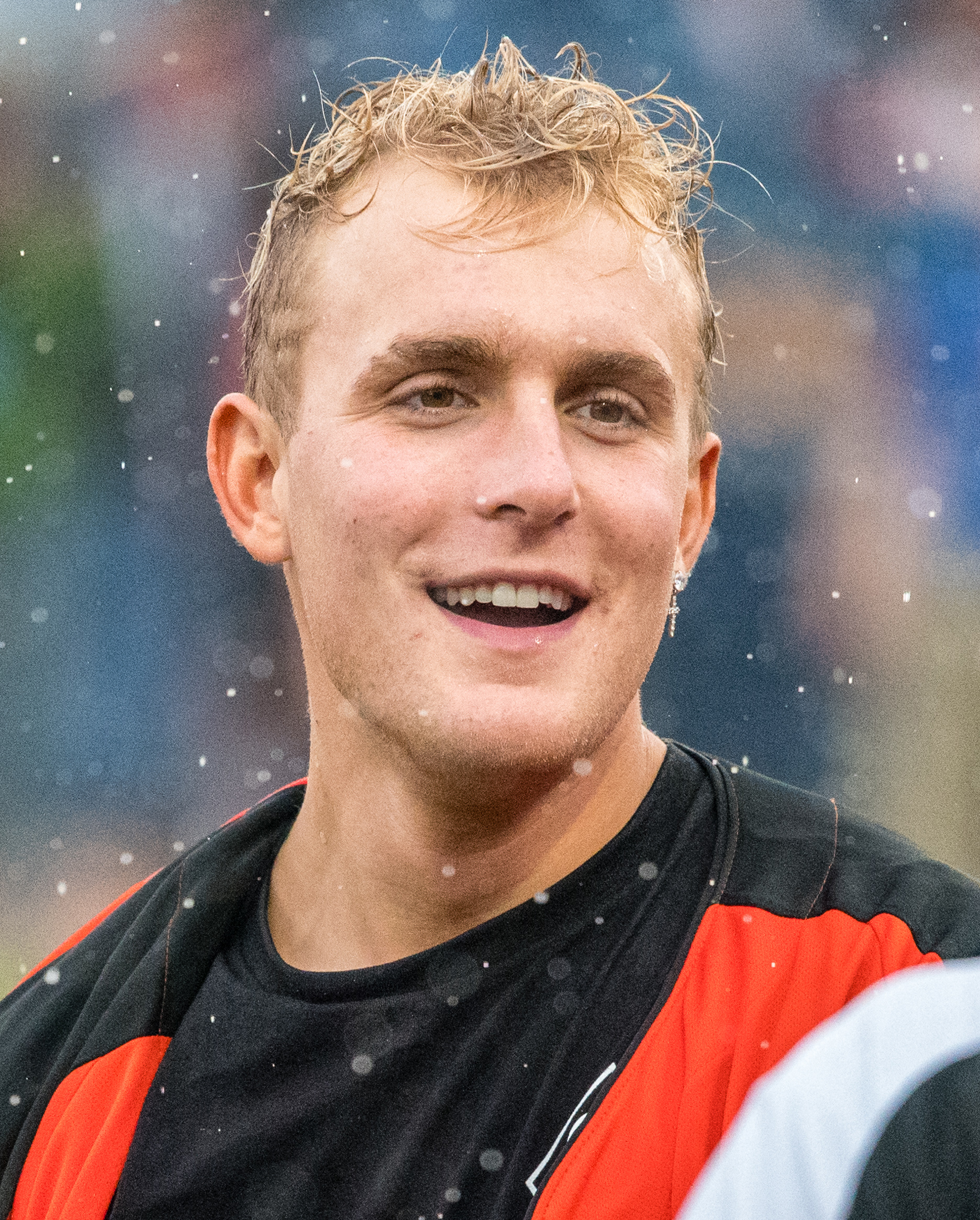
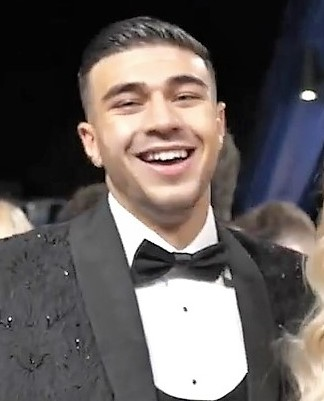
Jake Paul (left) and Tommy Fury (right).

Originally, Paul was scheduled to fight Tommy Fury on 18 December 2021. However, due to an injury, Fury pulled from the fight and was replaced by former UFC Welterweight Champion Tyron Woodley instead in a rematch billed as Leave No Doubt.

Paul was scheduled to fight Fury again on 6 August 2022. However, Fury pulled out of the bout due to travel issues. It was announced on 7 July 2022, that Hasim Rahman Jr. would replace Fury in the fight. This bout was also cancelled due to "weight-issues" (Rahman Jr. coming in overweight), and that all sales towards that fight would be refunded.

== Fight summary ==
On February 26, 2023, Jake Paul fought British Boxer Tommy Fury in an eight-round cruiserweight fight. The fight took place in Diriyah, Saudi Arabia and resulted in a split decision victory in favor of Tommy Fury. Fury threw nearly double the amount of Paul's thrown punches (302 to 157) and landed a higher percentage (88 to 49), though Paul scored a knockdown.

Two judges scored the bout 76–73 for Fury, while a third favored Paul by 75–74.

== Fight card ==
Weight Class		vs.		Method	Round	Time	Notes
Main Card (PPV)
Cruiserweight	Tommy Fury	def.	Jake Paul	SD	8 (8)		^{Note 1}
Cruiserweight	Badou Jack	def.	Ilunga Makabu (c)	TKO	12 (12)	0:54	^{Note 2}
Welterweight	Ziyad Almaayouf	def.	Ronald Martinez	UD	4 (4)
Cruiserweight	Muhsin Cason	def.	Taryel Jafarov	RTD	1 (8)	3:00
Super lightweight	Bader Samreen	def.	Viorel Simion	TKO	1 (8)	1:26
Preliminary Card (Boxing Arabia's YouTube channel)
Super lightweight	Adam Saleh	def.	Stuart Kellogg	RTD	1 (4)	3:00
Heavyweight	Salman Hamada	def.	Philip Samson	TKO	1 (3)	3:00
Heavyweight	Ragad Al Naimi	def.	Perpetual Okaijah	TKO	3 (3)	2:00
Heavyweight	Ziad Al Majrashi	def.	Philip Quansah	PTS	3	1:19

^Note 1 For the ceremonial WBC Diriyah title
^Note 2 For WBC cruiserweight title

== Broadcasting ==
Country/Region	Broadcaster			
Country/Region	Free	Cable TV	PPV	Stream
Middle East: Bahrain; Cyprus; Egypt; Iran; Iraq; Israel; Jordan; Kuwait; Lebanon; Oman; Palestine; Qatar; Saudi Arabia; Syria; United Arab Emirates; Yemen	—N/a		Shahid VIP	
United States	—N/a		ESPN+ FITE	
United Kingdom	—N/a		BT Sport Box Office	
Ireland	—N/a		BT Sport Box Office	
Australia	—N/a		Main Event; Kayo Sports	
New Zealand	—N/a		Sky Arena	
Canada	—N/a		DAZN	
Brazil	—N/a		DAZN	
Belgium	—N/a		HLN	
Germany	—N/a		Bild+	
Netherlands	—N/a		AD	
Latin America	—N/a		ESPN Knockout	
Finland	—N/a		Iltalehti Plus	
Sweden	—N/a		Sportbladet	
Norway	—N/a		VG+ Sport	
