= Desi Rascals =

2015 British television series

- Genre: Reality television
- Starring: Jasmin Walia; Ross Worswick
- Opening theme: TBC
- Country of origin: United Kingdom
- Original language: English
- No. of series: 2
- No. of episodes: 20 (list of episodes)

Production
- Executive producers: Gurinder Chadha; Tony Wood; Sharyn Mills
- Production location: London
- Running time: 60 minutes
- Production company: Buccaneer Media

Original release
- Network: Sky Living (Series 1); Sky 1 (Series 2)
- Release: 20 January – 9 September 2015

Desi Rascals is a reality television series broadcast by Sky 1 and Sky Living in the United Kingdom. Desi Rascals chronicled the lives of a multi-generational cast living within the British Asian community of London. The show was created by former producer of The Only Way Is Essex, Tony Wood, and Bend It Like Beckham director, Gurinder Chadha. Desi Rascals was cancelled on 15 October 2015 after disappointing ratings in the second series.

== History ==
The show was first commissioned by Celia Taylor, head of non-scripted at Sky, in September 2014. Sky Living director Antonia Hurford-Jones told Broadcast that the "way into" Desi Rascals would be through the eyes of a group of British Asian thirty-somethings. The first series began on 20 January 2015, continuing for twelve episodes, with two episodes broadcast each week (on Tuesday and Friday at 8pm). The show's title is a play on the name of British rapper, Dizzee Rascal, and Desi, a term for people from the Indian subcontinent.

After a successful first series, a second was commissioned by Sky and began broadcasting on Sky 1 on 22 July 2015. Unlike the debut series, the second failed to attract much of an audience and on 15 October 2015 it was revealed that a third series would not be commissioned.

=== Filming ===
Filming took place just days before broadcast in the West London areas of Gerrards Cross, Harrow, Hounslow, Wembley and Pinner.

== Main cast ==
Cast member	Occupation/role	Series
Adam Michaelidies	Businessman	2
Jason Lowe	Businessman	2
Farha Rai	Appeared on Take Me Out	2
Solomon Akhtar	Young entrepreneur, appeared on the tenth series of The Apprentice. He attended the University of Exeter.	2
Ross Worswick	Boyfriend to Jasmin. Appeared on the first series of Ex on the Beach	2
Jasmin Walia	Reality TV participant, appeared on The Only Way Is Essex from 2012 to 2015, Singer	2
Wajma Baig	Wife to Anj Baig	2
George Pigott	Personal assistant to Yasmin Karimi	2
Vaneeta Chapaneri	One of Shreena's best friends	2
Amita Patel	Beautician	1–2
Anj Baig	Owner of Pure Muscles Gym and Wembley's Anjees Dessert Lounge, older brother of Moses	1–2
Moses Baig	Gym worker and aspiring DJ, younger brother to Anj	1–2
Nusrat "Uncle Nuss" Beg	Bodybuilder and gym owner	1–2
Jay Vara	Builder, property developer, husband to Anita Vara, father of Sunjay Vara and Prakash Vara	1–2
Anita Vara	Hospital worker, wife to Jay Vara	1–2
Sunjay Vara	Mechanic, older brother to Prakash Vara	1–2
Shreena Vara	Online digital manager, wife to Prakash Vara	1–2
Prakash Vara	Head of business intelligence, son to Jay and Anita Vara and husband to Shreena Vara	1–2
Owais Khan	Property developer, personal trainer and model	1–2
Yasmin Karimi	Make-up artist	1–2
Ravi Gurtata	Works for family business	1–2
Blake Goodman	Financial consultant	1–2
Manoj Shah	Senior bank manager, husband to Celia Shah and father to Natalie and Jo. Famous for "meddling" and drinking tea.	1–2
Celia Shah	Healthcare assistant and phlebotomist, wife to Manoj Shah and mother to Natalie and Jo	1–2
Natalie Shah	Assistant supermarket manager/supervisor, sister to Jo Shah	1–2
Jo Shah	Performer and Bollywood dancer, sister to Natalie Shah	1–2
Arshina Trivedi	Co-owner of dance company Angels	1–2
Rita Siddiqui	Estate agent	1–2

== Episodes ==
=== Series 1 (2015) ===
The first series of Desi Rascals, with a total of twelve episodes, began showing on Tuesday 20 January 2015. It was broadcast on Sky Living and had an average of 105,000 viewers. Bollywood actor Amitabh Bachchan made a special appearance in the fourth episode broadcast on 30 January 2015.

No. overall	No. in series	Title	Original release date	UK viewers
1	1	"Episode 1"	20 January 2015	88,000
2	2	"Episode 2"	23 January 2015	65,000
3	3	"Episode 3"	27 January 2015	106,000
4	4	"Episode 4"	30 January 2015	74,000
5	5	"Episode 5"	3 February 2015	179,000
6	6	"Episode 6"	6 February 2015	123,000
7	7	"Episode 7"	10 February 2015	134,000
8	8	"Episode 8"	13 February 2015	90,000
9	9	"Episode 9"	17 February 2015	118,000
10	10	"Episode 10"	20 February 2015	70,000
11	11	"Episode 11"	23 February 2015	156,000
12	12	"Episode 12"	27 February 2015	59,000

=== Series 2 (2015) ===
Immediately after the finale of the first series, Sky commissioned a second series. On 6 July 2015, it announced that former The Only Way Is Essex cast member Jasmine Walia, her boyfriend Ross Worswick (Ex on the Beach), The Apprentice star Solomon Akhtar and Farah Rai of Take Me Out will all be starring in the second series. The second series trailer was released on 10 July 2015 and unlike the first series, will be broadcast on the main Sky channel Sky 1 rather than Sky Living. The second, and last series, began on 22 July 2015 and lasted eight episodes.

No. overall	No. in series	Title	Original release date	UK viewers
13	1	"Episode 1"	22 July 2015	161,400
14	2	"Episode 2"	29 July 2015	TBA
15	3	"Episode 3"	5 August 2015	TBA
16	4	"Episode 4"	12 August 2015	TBA
17	5	"Episode 5"	19 August 2015	TBA
18	6	"Episode 6"	26 August 2015	TBA
19	7	"Episode 7"	2 September 2015	TBA
20	8	"Episode 8"	9 September 2015	TBA
