= Bom Diggy =

Single by Zack Knight and Jasmin Walia
- Language: Punjabi, English
- Released: 24 August 2017
- Genre: Electro-R&B; Indi-pop
- Label: Saavn; Artist Originals; T-Series
- Songwriter: Zack Knight
- Producer: Aydin Vance

Zack Knight singles chronology
"Cry for Me" (2017)	"Bom Diggy" (2017)	"Galtiyan" (2017)

Jasmin Walia singles chronology
"Go Down" (2017)	"Bom Diggy" (2017)	"Bom Diggy Diggy" (2018)

Music video
- "Bom Diggy" on YouTube

"Bom Diggy" is a song by British singers Zack Knight and Jasmin Walia. It was released on 24 August 2017 through the Artist Originals subsidiary of Saavn Music and YouTube. The main verses are sung in Punjabi and English, while the sampled chorus is in Bengali. The single was serviced to iTunes, Spotify and SoundCloud at the same day. A remix version by Dillon Francis was released on 31 January 2018.

Later, Zack Knight made a remake of this song as "Bom Diggy Diggy" for the Indian film Sonu Ke Titu Ki Sweety, which was released on 8 February 2018 through T-Series, and music produced by Aditya Dev. As of April 2025, both versions of the song have over 1.6 Billion combined views on YouTube.

== Background ==
On 15 August 2017, Zack Knight released a trailer for the single. Described as "The US police team was searching Zack Knight and Jasmin Walia for stolen money from the bank. Later, seem they was counting the money." The video background was at party club. Background music was composed by Zack Knight. The music tune was made with unique bits, with some English rap. A remake version of this song had changed some lyrics with Knight's vocals and made more Punjabi bits with heavy EDM. The chorus of the song samples vocals from a Bengali folk song, found in a Voice of India sample pack. Barbadian singer Rihanna is name-dropped in the song.

== Critical reception ==
Kat Bein of Billboard wrote: "This track is a super-catchy tune that already featured some great electro elements over its Indian influence." Dillon Francis said, "It's great to see that the original 'Bom Diggy' single was one of the biggest tracks of last year. The remix is a great way to be involved in something with cross-cultural appeal and it's exciting to be involved with a platform that supports independent artists."

== Music video ==
The Bom Diggy official music video was released on 24 August 2017 on YouTube. The video was directed by Luke Biggins, Roger Russell and Knight himself. The music video starred Knight and Jasmine Walia. The video is about dancing, where Knight and Walia had performed to this song. The official music video has over 150 million views on YouTube as of April 2021.

The version of the song in Sonu Ke Titu Ki Sweety has a quite different music video, used in the film. Both music videos, along with the lyric video, have received over 1.5 billion views on YouTube as of October 2024.

== Track listing ==
Digital download
No.	Title	Length
1.	"Bom Diggy"	3:27

Digital download - Dillon Francis Remix
No.	Title	Length
1.	"Bom Diggy" (Dillon Francis Remix)	3:25

Digital download - Sonu Ke Titu Ki Sweety
No.	Title	Length
1.	"Bom Diggy Diggy" (from Sonu Ke Titu Ki Sweety)	3:58

== Charts ==
Original version only
Chart (2017)	Peak position
India (Shazam)	2
UK Asian (Official Charts Company)	1
UK Asian (BBC Asian Network)	1
