= Raxstar =

British rapper

- Born: 21 November 1983 (age 42); Luton, Bedfordshire, England
- Origin: Luton, United Kingdom
- Genres: Hip hop; R&B
- Occupations: Rapper; singer
- Instrument: Vocals
- Years active: 2005–present
- Labels: T-Series; Saavn; E3UK; DesiHipHop; DesiTrill; Timeless London; SB.TV
- Website: raxstardw.com

Raxstar (born 21 November 1983) is a British rapper and singer from Luton. Raxstar came into popularity after the release of "Keep It Undercover" in 2005. Following up with tracks like "Jaaneman", "Ego", "Poison" and "Balwant", he gained more mainstream attention, and has become one of the most popular artists in Desi hip hop.

== Early life ==
Raxstar was born and raised in Luton, Bedfordshire, East of England into a working class family of Indian Punjabi Sikh descent. Raxstar has two brothers, one older and one younger.

== Career ==
=== Early career ===
Before the release of his first single, Raxstar created mixtapes in cassettes and CDs and passed them out to his peers in high school and college. After releasing music online on his website, Raxstar became a featured artist on one of Rishi Rich's projects.

== Discography ==
=== Extended Play ===
- Fulfilling Ambition EP (2007)
- sadboihours (2022)

=== Mixtapes ===
- Lost Ones (2008)
- Spring Cleaning (2010)
- About A Girl (2011)
- Late on Time (2012)
- Dream Warriors Live Session (2014)

=== Studio albums ===
- Glass Ceiling (2018)
- Artbreak (2019)
- Threats (with KALY) (2019)
- Content (2022)
- Not Again (2024)

=== Singles ===
Year	Song	Music	Reference(s)
2005	Keep It Undercover	Sunit	
2005	SH1	Sunit	
2005	In Perspective	Sunit	
2010	Name On The Poster	Sunit	
2010	Fading	Sunit & S-Lyne	
2011	Jaaneman	SunitMusic	
2011	The Other Man (featuring RKZ)	SunitMusic	
2011	Dhalsim	June 25	
2011	Ex Games	Substeppers	
2011	What's Inside	Young Archie	
2012	Flirt	DJ Surinder Rattan	
2012	I Am (featuring Humble the Poet)	Tazzz	
2013	Ego	SunitMusic	
2013	Dream Warriors	SunitMusic	
2013	Cold World	SunitMusic	
2014	Got Me Singing (featuring Mumzy Stranger)	SunitMusic & Lyan	
2014	Brand New Swag (Remix)	Haji Springer	
2014	Tear Drops	Tazzz	
2015	Desi Hip Hop (Manj Musik featuring Raxstar, Roach Killa, Humble the Poet, Big Dhillon, Badshah, Sarb Smooth & Raftaar)		
2015	Poison	DJ Harpz	
2015	Ego (Remix) (featuring Fateh, Tazzz, Badshah, Kaly, Humble the Poet & RKZ)	SunitMusic	
2015	Bandook (featuring Badshah)	SunitMusic	
2015	Four Seasons	SunitMusic	
2016	Ya Baba (Remix)	Zack Knight & Rami Beatz	
2016	Nothing	Dj Harpz	
2016	Ankhiyaan (with Kanika Kapoor)	Ezu	
2016	Signs (with Rajeev B featuring Mickey Singh)	Rajeev B	
2016	Nashanebaaj (PAM featuring Raxstar)	PAM	
2016	Queen (featuring Zack Knight)	Zack Knight	
2016	GameTime (featuring Various Artists)	Bohemia	
2016	4 Desis (featuring Haji Springer & Pardhaan)	Haji Springer	
2017	Shudai (Neha Bhasin featuring Raxstar)		
2017	Balwant (featuring SunitMusic)	SunitMusic	
2017	Nothing (Remix) (featuring Bohemia)	Dj Harpz	
2017	King Midas (with SunitMusic)	SunitMusic	
2017	Turn Me On (Remix) (Nish featuring Mumzy Stranger & Raxstar)	SP	
2017	Driving School (Man Like Malik & Raxstar)	Sonna Rele and Sauce	
2017	Sun Raha (featuring Shreya Goshal)	SunitMusic	
2018	Rewind (featuring Amar Sandhu)	DJ Lyan	
2018	Kehndi Mainu (Raves featuring Raxstar)	Producer X	
2018	SBTV Neglect & Feeling Invisible	Nihle Robbins	
2018	Lost Our Way (featuring Arjun)	DJ Lyan	
2018	Glass Ceiling	Haji Springer	
2018	Ki Kargeyi (featuring The PropheC)	The Prophec	
2018	ROTI (Pav Dharia featuring Raxstar)	Rokitbeats	
2018	Love	Ezu and Shayal	
2018	Pearls (Rubal Sikka featuring Raxstar)	Producer X	
2018	Yamla Jat (featuring Pav Dharia)	Shayal	
2018	Scorpio SZN	Haji Springer	
2018	Dance (F1rstman featuring Mumzy, H-Dhami, Raxstar & Juggy D)	Harun B	
2018	Temptation (featuring Samica)	Rimshox	
2019	More	Myze	
2019	Pressure	Mr Kam	
2019	Remember (Nish featuring Raxstar)	Nish	
2019	Full Tank (featuring RKZ)	Luke Masih	
2019	Friends (The Ex Mix)	Luke Masih	
2019	The Future (Raxstar and Kaly)	Ghauri	
2019	Pray (Raxstar and Kaly)	Ghauri	
2019	Falling (H-Dhami featuring Raxstar)	DJ Lyan	
2019	Time (featuring F1rstman)	Morry	
2019	Say Less	Harun B	
2019	London (featuring Amar Sandhu)	Rimshox	
2020	Dil Vaaja Maarda	DJ Lyan	
2020	Kaun Tujhe	Ezu	
2020	Quarantine	Ezu	
2020	Airplane Mode	Enco	
2020	Airplane Mode (Runaway Remix)	Byro	
2020	2020	Byro	
2021	Forever Jaaneman	SunitMusic	
2021	Chemistry (featuring H-Dhami)	SP	
2021	Fix This (featuring Raashi Sood)	Shri Gadhvi & Stranger Productions	
2021	Shining	Rimshox	
2021	Never Thought (featuring Arjun and Ahmed Khan)	Byro	
2022	Edible	Byro	
2022	Mundra (featuring S-Jay)	Myze	
2022	Ask (Teri Khair Mangdi) (featuring Shweta Pandya)	Myze	
2022	Yes or No	Bajaj	
2023	Kinni Soni	DJ Lyan	
2023	Questions (featuring Fateh DOE)	Stranger Productions	
2023	Kehta Hai (featuring STYM)	STYM	
2023	NZR	Rimshox	
2024	Saari Raat (featuring Tasha Tah)	SunitMusic	

== Awards ==
- Brit Asia TV Music Awards 2014 "Best Urban Asian Act"
- Eastern Eye 2014 Best Independent Act "
- Brit Asia TV Music Awards 2019 Best Collaboration for "Dance" by F1rstman, Juggy D, H Dhami, Mumzy and Raxstar
