= Manj Musik =

British-Indian music producer

- Born: Manjeet Singh Ral; 24 August 1984 (age 42); Bradford, UK
- Citizenship: UK
- Occupations: Rapper; Singer; Music Producer; Songwriter
- Years active: 2014–present
- Spouse: Single
- Musical career
- Genres: Bollywood; Desi Hip Hop; R&B; Pop; Urban; Hip hop; Punjabi rap

Manjeet Singh Ral (Punjabi: ਮਨਜੀਤ ਸਿੰਘ ਰਾਲ, born 24 August 1984), better known by his stage-name Manj Musik, is a British Indian composer, singer and Filmi scorer. He was one of the music composer for the bhangra music group RDB, which was formed with his two brothers Surjeet Singh (SurjRDB) and Kuldeep Ral in 2001.

== Career ==
Manj Musik started his musical journey with RDB group singing at their local gurudwara.

After the death of his older brother Kuljeet Ral, Manj Musik decided to leave RDB. Beginning his solo career in 2014, he was awarded "Best Urban Single" at the Brit Asia TV Music Awards for "Swag Mera Desi", which was performed by himself and Raftaar.

Manj Musik began producing his own singles and also began to produce music in Bollywood, and has worked with established actors such as Saif Ali Khan, Shahrukh Khan and Akshay Kumar, among others. In 2014, Manj founded his own music label Muzik ONE Records.

== Muzik ONE records ==
Muzik ONE Records
- Founded: 2014
- Founder: Manj Musik
- Status: Active
- Country of origin: India
- Location: Mumbai, Maharastra

Muzik ONE Records is a Mumbai-based record label founded by British Indian singer, music director, and producer Manj Musik in 2014. Later renamed as Muzik ONE Global, Manj described that the label is built to give full marketing, promotions and financial support to up and coming independent artists and not the label itself. Previously, the roster included Vee Music, Abeer Arora, the Indian hip-hop crew KKG (Kala Kurta Gang), consisting of rappers Sikander Kahlon, Sady Immortal and Rob C, Moyur, O2 & SRK, Mr. Richi, Sarb Smooth, Nindy Kaur, Manj Musik, and Raftaar.

=== Discography ===
| Singles | Release date | Artist(s) |
|---|---|---|
| Goli | 25 August 2014 | Manj Musik, Raftaar |
| Desi Hip Hop | 8 January 2015 | Manj Musik, Raftaar, Raxstar, Badshah, Humble The Poet, Big Dhillon, Sarb Smooth, Roach Killa |
| Shut Your Mouth | 25 February 2015 | Sarb Smooth, Manj Musik, Raxstar |
| Stand Up | 16 April 2016 | Manj Musik, Raftaar, Big Dhillon, O2SRK |
| Billo Hai | 25 September 2015 | Herbie Sahara, Raftaar, Manj Musik |
| You Can't Stop This Party | 31 July 2017 | Noopsta, Humble The Poet, Raftaar |
| KITN | 28 August 2017 | Sikander Kahlon |
| Only You | 31 October 2017 | Mr. Richi, Manj Musik |
| Swag On 100 | 21 January 2018 | Sikander Kahlon, Sady Immortal |
| Drunk On You | 28 January 2018 | Abeer Arora, Hardybazy |

== Artist Discography ==
=== Singles ===
| Year | Title | Artist(s) | Album(s) | Ref. |
|---|---|---|---|---|
| 2014 | "Swag Mera Desi Hai (MTV Spoken Word)" | Raftaar feat. Manj Musik | | |
| 2014 | "Fukra Flow" | Feat. Raftaar | | |
| 2014 | "Goli" | Feat. Raftaar | | |
| 2014 | "Shera Di Kaum (Remix)" | Feat. Raftaar | | |
| 2014 | "Party Like A Punjabi" | Feat. Gippy Grewal | | |
| 2015 | "Desi Hip Hop (MTV Spoken Word)" | Feat. Various Artists | | |
| 2015 | "Don't Do It" | Feat. Sarb Smooth | | |
| 2015 | "Stand Up (MTV Spoken Word)" | Feat. Raftaar, BIG Dhillon | | |
| 2015 | "Billo Hai" | Sahara & Raftaar | | |
| 2015 | "Mombatiye" | Zohaib Amjad Feat: Raftaar | | |
| 2016 | "Chal Chaliye" | Sikander Kahlon | | |
| 2016 | "Hasna" | Feat. Ammy Virk | | |
| 2016 | "Lak Hilaade" | Feat. Raftaar | | |
| 2017 | "Kudi Baeymaan" | Manj Musik | | |
| 2017 | "High Rated Gabru" | Guru Randhawa | | |
| 2017 | "Gangster Look" | L-Kay | Punjabi Billboard | |
| 2018 | "Make Some Space" | Manj Musik | Punjabi Billboard | |
| 2018 | "Time" | Manj Musik, Ranjit Bawa | Punjabi Billboard | |
| 2018 | "Gallan" | Manj Musik | Punjabi Billboard | |
| 2018 | "Shehar Vich Gallan" | Manj Musik, Sikander Kahlon, Jaz Dhami | Punjabi Billboard | |

=== Film soundtracks ===
| Year | Song | Film | Notes |
|---|---|---|---|
| 2013 | "Tamanchey Pe Disco" | Bullet Raja | composed by RDB |
| 2014 | "Whistle Baja" | Heropanti | composed by Manj Musik |
| 2014 | "The Puppy Song" | Heropanti | composed by Manj Musik |
| 2014 | "Dal Makhni" | Dr. Cabbie | composed by Manj Musik |
| 2015 | "Warna Gabbar Aa Jaega" | Gabbar is Back | composed by Manj Musik |
| 2015 | "Singh And Kaur" | Singh Is Bling | composed by Manj Musik |
| 2015 | "Aaja Mahi" | Singh Is Bling | composed by Manj Musik |
| 2015 | "Aaja Mahi (Unplugged)" | Singh Is Bling | composed by Manj Musik |
| 2016 | "Let's Talk About Love" | Baaghi | composed by Manj Musik |
| 2016 | "Mar Gaye" | Beiimaan Love | composed by Manj Musik |
| 2017 | "Go Pagal" | Jolly LLB 2 | composed by Manj Musik |
| 2019 | "Mukhda Vekh Ke" | De De Pyaar De | composed by Manj Musik |
| 2019 | "Laal Ghaghra" | Good Newwz | composed by Manj Musik |
