= Mickey Singh =

American-Indian singer-songwriter, producer, actor and model

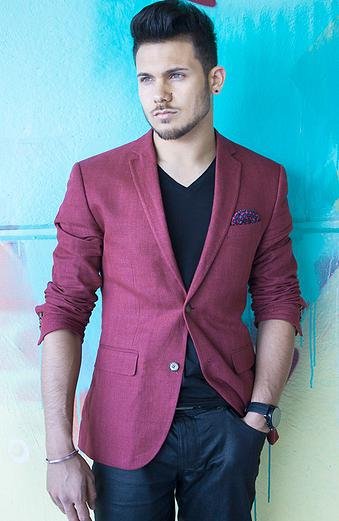
- Singh in 2014

Background information
- Born: Harmanjit Singh
- Genres: Bhangra; pop; R&B; fusion
- Occupations: Singer-songwriter; record producer; social media personality
- Years active: 2012–present
- Labels: TreeHouse V.H.T; MathOne Ent; Speed Records; Eros International

Harmanjit "Mickey" Singh (born December 21, 1990) is an Indian-American singer, songwriter, producer, dancer, model and actor. He gained widespread popularity through his first mixtape of Punjabi and English music, Mick's Tape. It was released for free download on July 22, 2013, and included the tracks Bad Girl, In Love and Rani Mehlan Di. His music combines American and Punjabi music, and epitomizes the Urban Desi genre; it has also been influenced by jazz.

His recent singles have included Rooftop Party, Ho Gaya Pyaar, Body, Hold Me, Lost, Phone and Yarri Yeah, Na Na, 4AM, Nachle 101.

== Career ==
=== 2012–2014 ===
In 2012, he released a Punjabi remix of "Birthday Cake", with vocals by Singh and Amar Sandhu. Shortly after, in December 2012, he released a remake of Rahat Fateh Ali Khan's Akhiyan with his own blend of western music and Punjabi vocals. On July 22, 2013, he released the mixtape Mick's Tape which included ten songs that incorporated a blend of western sounds and Indian vocals. His Mick's Tape Tour spread across 50 cities in North America.

Bad Girl was the first music video from the mixtape. At present, it has received over 22 million views breaking Mickey Singh into the Urban Desi scene. The single was recognized as a must have in your Punjabi workout playlist by Women's Health magazine in December 2014.

The second song from the EP which has a music video is titled "In Love" featured Mickey Singh alongside Pakistani teenage artist Asim Azhar.

=== 2014–present ===
His first official single was through his own label MathOne Ent. The track is titled "Double Addi" and it features vocals from Singh, Amar Sandhu, and DJ Ice. The music for the song is also produced by Singh along with 2 NyCe. It now has over 10 million + views.

His first official release in India and also through an Indian-based record label occurred on February 9, 2015, when he released the single "Ho Gaya Pyar" through Speed Records. He won "Best North American Act" at the Brit Asia TV Music Awards 2015.

Singh collaborated with Diljit Dosanjh on romantic song titled "Ishq Haazir Hai" for whom Singh wrote the lyrics and produced the music. The song reached No. 1 on the BBC Asian Network download chart the first week.

Singh has performed alongside the Bollywood singers Shaan, Sunidhi Chauhan, Ali Zafar, Manj Musik, Raftaar, Badshah, Imran Khan, Jay Sean and also with actors like Parineeti Chopra, Aditya Roy Kapoor and Harjot Dhillon.

In 2018 Singh appeared in the Zee 5 show Lockdown along with Monali Thakur which was produced by Badshah's production house Afterhours.

In January 2019, Singh performed the half-time show for the NBA basketball game, Golden State Warriors vs. Sacramento Kings, at Golden 1 Center arena in Sacramento, CA.

== Discography ==
Year	Title	Singer-songwriter	Music director
2012	Birthday Cake Bake	Mickey Singh, Amar Sandhu	Mickey Singh
2012	Akhiyan (Remake)	Mickey Singh	Mickey Singh
2013	Snap Back	Mickey Singh, Amar Sandhu	Mickey Singh
2013	Kali Behke	Mickey Singh	Mickey
2013	Baichen	Mickey Singh	Mickey Singh
2013	Bad Girl (Single)	Mickey Singh, Waseem Stark	Irene Mahmud
2013	Rani Mehlan Di (Micks' Tape)	Mickey Singh	Mickey Singh
2014	Bullet (Single)	Kay V Singh	Mickey Singh, Epic Bhangra
2014	Double Addi (Single)	Mickey Singh, Amar Sandhu, DJ Ice	Mickey Singh, 2 NyCe
2014	Galliyan (Remix)	Mickey Singh	Mickey Singh
2015	Ho Gaya Pyar (Single)	Mickey Singh, DJ Ice	Mickey Singh, 2 NyCe
2015	Ishq Haazir Hai (Single)	Diljit Dosanjh	Mickey Singh
2015	Bad Girl (Single)	Mickey Singh & Waseem Stark	Mickey Singh
2015	Cheerleader ReMick's	Mickey Singh	Mickey Singh
2015	Dil Kafiraa (For Movie "Shareek")	Mickey Singh	Jaidev Kumar
2015	Rooftop Party (Single)	Mickey Singh, Amar Sandhu	UpsideDown
2015	Body (Single)	Mickey Singh, Sunny Brown, Fateh Doe	Mickey Singh, Fateh Doe
2016	Tujhse (Single)	Mickey Singh	Palash Muchhal
2016	Signs (Single)	Mickey Singh, Raxstar	Rajeev B
2016	Phone	Mickey Singh	UpsideDown
2016	Lost	Mickey Singh	Sanjoy
2016	Hold Me	Mickey Singh	UpsideDown
2018	I am Urban Desi	Mickey Singh & Friends	Mickey Singh
2018	YTL (Yaar Tera Lit)	Mickey Singh	Mickey Singh, Pam Sengh
2018	TU	Mickey Singh	Mickey Singh
2018	Magic	Mickey Singh	Tedi Pagg
2019	Name On It	Mickey Singh	Tedi Pagg
2019	Tu Hi Das De	Simar Panag ft. Mickey Singh	Tedi Pagg
2019	Kand	Mickey Singh ft. Dana Alexa	Mickey Singh
2019	Yarri Yeah	Mickey Singh ft. Anjali	Mickey Singh, Tedi Pagg, Khawaja
2019	Summer Luv	Simar Panag	Mickey Singh, Tedi Pagg
2019	Closer	Mickey Singh ft. Dilpreet Dhillon	Tedi Pagg
2019	Tingo	Mickey Singh & Arjun	Tedi Pagg
2019	Ptola	Mickey Singh & Pam Sengh	Tedi Pagg
2020	Left to love	Mickey Singh & Rika	Mickey Singh
2020	Teri Meri	Mickey Singh	Mickey Singh
2020	Black Suit	Mickey Singh	Mickey Singh
2020	All By Myself	Mickey Singh	Mickey Singh
2020	Crowd	Mickey Singh	Mickey Singh
2021	Na Na	Mickey Singh & Jonita	Mickey Singh, DJ Lyan
2021	4 AM	Mickey Singh & Jonita	Mickey Singh
2021	Sorry	Mickey Singh	
2022	Let Me Be	Mickey Singh	Pacific
2022	Feels Like	Mickey Singh	Jess Loco
2022	Missing Me	Mickey Singh	Jess Loco
2022	Nachle 101	Mickey Singh	DJ Ice

== See also ==
- List of American musicians
- List of dancers
- List of songwriters
- List of record producers

== Concert tour(s) ==
=== Live performances ===
1. Straight Up Punjab (2019)
2. BBCAsianNetwork (2019)
3. Vancouver (2018)
