= Diriyah Arena =

Outdoor arena in Diriyah, Saudi Arabia

- Interactive map of Diriyah Arena
- Address: Diriyah; Saudi Arabia
- Coordinates: 24.73809°N 46.58611°E
- Capacity: 15,000

Construction
- Built: 2019

The Diriyah Arena is an outdoor arena in Diriyah, Saudi Arabia. It has a capacity of 15,000.

== History ==
The arena was first used for the mega fight between Anthony Joshua and Andy Ruiz. (Clash on the Dunes) The bout took place in December 2019 where Anthony Joshua avenged his defeat in New York by Unanimous Decision. In February 2023, YouTube star Jake Paul took on Tommy Fury which he lost by Split Decision. Built up as (The Truth) the event brought in over 800 thousand PPV buys. The arena has also hosted tennis events and has been renovated. The arena will host more sporting events in future years.

== Events ==
Andy Ruiz Jr. vs Anthony Joshua II was held at the venue on December 7, 2019.

Jake Paul vs Tommy Fury was held at the venue on February 26, 2023.

== See also ==
- Diriyah
- Sport in Saudi Arabia
