= Zack Knight =

British-Pakistani singer-songwriter

- Also known as: Zeekay (until 2011)
- Born: Grimsby, Lincolnshire, England
- Genres: R&B; pop; Asian Underground; hip hop
- Occupations: Singer, Songwriter
- Years active: 2011–past
- Labels: T-Series; Saavn; Revolve Records
- Website: iamzackknight.uk

Zack Knight is a British-Pakistani singer, songwriter and music producer. Formerly known by the stage name Zeekay until 2011, he has released several popular songs, including "Bom Diggy", "Ya Baba", "Galtiyan", "Nakhre", " Rula Diya", and "Enemy".

== Life and career ==
Knight was born in Grimsby, Lincolnshire, England, to a Pakistani Punjabi mother and a Pakistani father. He moved to Haywards Heath, West Sussex, in 1999, studying at Oathall Community College. He describes his music as having an R&B infused style with a crossover sound which is influenced by Bollywood and Middle-Eastern music. He cites Michael Jackson, Boyz II Men, and Usher as his main inspirations. Knight produces, composes, and engineers his own music. He is multilingual, writing lyrics in English, Urdu, Punjabi, and Hindi and incorporating elements of Arabic and Bengali.

=== 2007–10: The Zeekay years ===
Using the stage name Zeekay or Zee Kay, Knight began his career primarily as a songwriter for such artists as Tinie Tempah, Ginuwine, Stylo G, IYAZ, and various X Factor contestants. In 2007, he wrote the single "Baby (Dil Deewana)" for the US R&B artist Ginuwine. Shortly afterwards, he started producing R&B and hip-hop singles. His debut single, "My Moment" (produced by Pcru, Flipnotez), released in 2008, reached #3 in the Myspace R&B charts. This success led to a production deal with "Mr Skills", creator of Big Brova's, with whom he had been working on his debut album. From here, Knight produced several other singles across the span of 2 years, including "In Denial" (which he performed at various Live shows), "Love U Right" ft Tinie Tempah, "Save It", and "Inspiration".

Knight performed in concerts with Taio Cruz, Mario, and Jessie J in live concerts and shows. During this time, he was studying to obtain a degree in economics. Knight postponed his studies to concentrate on his musical aspirations, though he did eventually graduate. After 2010, he updated his stage name from Zeekay to his real name, Zack Knight, which he still uses today.

=== 2011–14: Re-branding, covers and albums ===
After 2010, Knight, now operating without his stage name/alias, produced several singles and albums. As a result of his re-branding, he began working with different artists and producers. His musical style also changed, shifting focus from a hip-hop inspired sound to a pop music influence. He attained regional and national support for his debut single, "All Over Again", in 2012, and his second single, "Who I Am", was featured as one of iTunes "New & Noteworthy" picks of the month. This was then followed by his third single, "When I'm Gone." (These three singles were later incorporated into his 2016 album, On Repeat.) He was also active in producing his own covers and remixes of popular songs on his YouTube channel. During this period, Knight produced two further albums, "Poison In My Sleep" (2014), and "On Repeat" (2016, but with songs dating back to 2011–12).

=== 2014–present ===
In 2014, Knight signed a deal with T-Series. Under this record label, he made several singles, including "Dheere", "Nakhre", "Enemy", "Looking For Love", and "Tere Naam", most of which topped the BBC Asian Network Charts. He worked with various artists within the BBC Asian Network Industry, including Raxstar and Jasmin Walia. He also collaborated with artists outside the United Kingdom, including rapper Badshah, playback singer Mohammad Irfan, and American YouTube personality Adam Saleh. He was appointed BBC Music Ambassador in 2017.

During this period, Knight also wrote and produced "Bom Diggy" featuring Jasmin Walia, amassing over 1.3 billion views on YouTube (as of August 2025). This track appeared in the Bollywood comedy Sonu Ke Titu Ki Sweety (2018) and was accompanied by two Top 5 peaking singles in the UK R&B iTunes charts ("Ya Baba", "Tears"), one Top 10 UK Dance iTunes chart ("Love Controller"), three Consecutive Number ones on the BBC Asian Network Download Chart ("Nakhre", "Lamhe", "Enemy"), and ten top Top 5 singles in the World/Asian Charts.

Knight's musical production ranges from independent creations to remixes, mashups, and medleys of other songs. His remixes typically combine various Bollywood songs with English R&B, acoustic-type covers remixed with popular songs, or his own music.

On 28 February 2021, in collaboration with Jernade Miah and Kayes Rashid, Knight released a new song named "Para Rum Pa" on YouTube. The song reached over 200k+ views on its release day, and over 1M views within 2 weeks.

On 14 October 2021, Knight released a 3-track album titled 'Dear Dad' in memory of his father, who died in August 2021. His most recent album, 'iamzackknight', was released in 2022. His latest cover is Kahani Suno 2.0 and Bollywood Medley 9.

In 2022, Knight collaborated with Nora Fatehi for the song "Dirty Little Secret".

== Discography ==
=== Singles ===
Title	Year	Featuring	Label	Ref.
"Runaway Now"	2013		Prestige Records	
"Smoke & Mirrors"	2013		Prestige Records	
"Pyaas"	2014	Khiza	Hi-Tech Music Ltd	
"Tere Naal"	2014	Khiza, Soni J	Hi-Tech Music Ltd	
"Dheere"	2014	Khiza, Kumar Sanu	T-Series	
"Makin 'em Mad"	2014	Shad Star	Nasty Beatmakers	
"Who You Are"	2014	Kirk Norcross	Quantize Music	
"Superhuman Lovers"	2014	Juvey, Erlando	Quantize Music	
"Women"	2015	Shide Boss	Merci Records	
"Lamhe"	2015		Hi-Tech Music Ltd	
"Green Eyes"	2015	SCALES	Mixmash Records	
"Snap"	2015		Quantize Music	
"MVP"	2015	Jernade Miah	?	
"Looking for Love (Main Dhoondne)"	2015	Arijit Singh	T-Series	
"Nakhre"	2015		T-Series	
"Main Aur Tum"	2015		T-Series	
"Queen"	2015	Raxstar	T-Series	
"Your Name (Tujhe Bhula Diya)"	2015	Mohit Chauhan	T-Series	
"Tears"	2015	Adam Saleh	Naz Promotions	
"Dum Dee Dum"	2016	Jasmin Walia	T-Series	
"Ishq Mubarak (Refix)" (for Tum Bin II)	2016	Arijit Singh	T-Series	
"Enemy"	2016		T-Series	
"Tere Naam"	2016		T-Series	
"BomBae"	2016	Fuse ODG, Badshah	Off Da Ground	
"Ya Baba"	2016	Rami Beatz	Quantize Music	
"Chahat"	2016		Quantize Music	
"Love Controller"	2016	Dayne S	Revolve Records	
"General"	2017	Joe Killington	Revolve Records	
"Cry for Me"	2017		Revolve Records	
"Bom Diggy"	2017	Jasmin Walia	Saavn	
"Gimme That"	2017	Adam Saleh	Naz Promotions	
"Galtiyan"	2017		Quantize Music	
"Bom Diggy Diggy" (for Sonu Ke Titu Ki Sweety)	2018	Jasmin Walia	T-Series	
"Till I Met You"	2018		Revolve Records	
"Need Your Love"	2018	Nicolina	?	
"Instagram Famous"	2018	Adam Saleh	Naz Promotions	
"Thumka"	2018	Ayesha Mughal	Revolve Records	
"Bills"	2018		Revolve Records	
"Gotta Go"	2019		Revolve Records	
"Angel"	2019		Revolve Records	
"Tumhari Jagga"	2019		Revolve Records	
"Dua"	2020		Revolve Records	
"Dil Diya Laya"	2020		Revolve Records	
"Crash and Burn"	2020	Adam Saleh	Revolve Records	
"Beautiful To Me"	2020		Revolve Records	
"Adhura"	2020		Revolve Records	
"Para Rum Pa"	2021	Jernade Miah	Revolve Records	
"Armani"	2021	Amar Sandhu	Revolve Records	
"Ego"	2021		Revolve Records	
"Stand With You"	2021		Revolve Records	
"Yaar Tu"	2022		Revolve Records	
"Dirty Little Secret"	2022	Nora Fatehi	Nora Fatehi	

== Awards ==
Year	Award Name
2015	Best Breakthrough Act, Brit Asia TV Music Awards
2015	Pakistan Music Media Awards
2017	Best Urban Asian Act, Brit Asia TV Music Awards
2018	Best Music Director, International Indian Film Academy
2018	Album of the Year, Mirchi Music Awards, IN
