= JioSaavn =

Indian music streaming service

- JioSaavn music on Android version 8.6.1 (March 2022), showcasing the app's Home tab.
- Developer: Bodvod Network (2006–2018); Jio Platforms (2018–present)
- Key people: Sahas Malhotra (CEO; 2022–present)
- Launched: 2007; 19 years ago (as Saavn); 2018; 8 years ago (as JioSaavn)
- Platforms: Android; iOS; watchOS; Alexa; Google Home; Windows
- Pricing model: ₹99 per month on Android / ₹119 per month via iTunes on iOS; ₹749 per year on Android and iOS
- Availability: Worldwide
- Website: www.jiosaavn.com

JioSaavn is an Indian Freemium music streaming service and a digital distributor of music in Hindi, Marathi, English, Konkani, Malayalam, Bengali, Kannada, Tamil, Telugu, Bhojpuri, Punjabi, Chhattisgarhi and other regional languages of India. Since it was founded in 2007 as Saavn, the company has acquired rights to over 80 million music tracks in 16 languages. JioSaavn is a freemium service; basic features are free with advertisements or limitations, while additional features, such as improved streaming quality and music downloads for offline listening, are offered via paid subscriptions.

On 23 March 2018, Saavn announced merger with JioMusic in a deal worth more than $1 billion. The merger was completed in December 2018, with Saavn being rebranded JioSaavn.

== History ==
Saavn was founded in 2006 as BODVOD Network and initially distributed Hindi Cinema content in North America in a B2B offering. Saavn later shifted its core focus to become a music destination for fans of Bollywood and other Indic music in 2009, re-launching its flagship product, Saavn.com, to become a B2C product. As of today, Saavn is one of the largest distributors of Bollywood and other Indian entertainment in the world.

On March 23, 2018, Reliance Industries acquired a Controlling interest in Saavn and its digital music service, JioMusic. The combined entity is valued at over US$1 billion and renamed as JioSaavn.

== Products and services ==
JioSaavn's products are JioSaavn Pro, its music service that offers offline listening without advertisements, with improved music quality and its mobile apps, JioSaavn for Android and iOS.

Saavn also integrated a social networking feature with its music streaming service in April 2015. Saavn Social allows users to follow the profiles and playlists of their friends as well as celebrities. Users can share any song, album or playlist with their friends and chat about music in real time.

=== Revenue model ===
JioSaavn's business model is based on digital advertising services (offers service with advertisements) and a subscription-based business model (JioSaavn Pro, offers ad-free and offline streaming).

=== Partnerships ===
==== Amazon ====
JioSaavn was one of the first music streaming services in India to be made available on Amazon's voice assistant, Alexa, which shipped nationwide in October 2017.

==== Shazam ====
In 2013, Shazam, a media engagement company, entered into an exclusive partnership with Saavn. As a part of this, Saavn's music library was incorporated in Shazam's music database. Saavn aims to provide its users with an enhanced listening experience with Shazam's music engagement tools especially in popular genres like bhangra, devotional, ghazals, Carnatic, Indipop and regional language music like Hindi, Punjabi, Kannada, Malayalam, Tamil, Telugu, Gujarati, Marathi, Bengali, Urdu and Bhojpuri.

==== Twitter ====
Saavn launched its radio model in 2013 and later partnered with Twitter to crowd-source song requests via the custom handle @SaavnRadio.

==== Apps for iOS, Android and Windows 10 ====
In 2010, Saavn introduced its first mobile app - Saavn Music for Android. This was followed up with Saavn Music for iPhone. Saavn for iOS has received 9,000+ ratings with an average rating of 4.5 Stars. In mid-2011, Saavn added its latest app, Saavn Music for Chrome, to the Chrome Web Store and later on Microsoft Store running Windows 10.

==== Facebook ====
Saavn was selected in December 2011 to be Facebook's first global partner and Indian partner on the Open Graph platform. This integration with Facebook allows users to stream any of Saavn's millions of tracks using their Facebook logins and to listen to music from Facebook. In the first three days of launch, Open Graph doubled the total number of visitors to Saavn.com, and increased the number of visitors from Facebook to Saavn by 15 times. Nearly half of Saavn's user base uses Facebook Connect.

==== Sony Music ====
Saavn partnered with Sony Music to acquire Sony's entire database of music catalog in 2012.

==== Other partners ====
Saavn has 900+ label partnerships including Universal Music Group, Sony Music, T-Series, Tips, YRF, Saregama, Zee Music Company, Eros Music, Warner Music Group and Independent record label. Saavn's brand partners include global names like AT&T, Bose, Lay's, General Motors, Nokia, Samsung, and Western Union.

=== Creative collaborator ===
Saavn teamed up with popular Bollywood actor Ranbir Kapoor in 2014. He joined Saavn to collaborate on consumer marketing ideas and business development. The actor was reportedly interested in working at a more business-oriented level at Saavn. He has expressed his desire to help "guide the brand, influence programming, connect with the next generation of music listeners and ultimately help build the best music product in India and potentially the world." The partnership led to a number of ad campaigns that were launched in India and select international networks and generated more than 7 million combined YouTube views. Ranbir Kapoor is also co-owner / part-owner of Saavn.

=== Corporate social responsibility ===
In February 2015, Saavn partnered with philanthropy non-profit Akshaya Patra Foundation for the launch of #MusicForMeals. For every hour of music streamed on Saavn, the company helps provide mid-day meals to school-going children through Akshaya Patra's network of schools.

Saavn also works with the Internet and Mobile Association of India (IAMAI), a not-for-profit industry body that represents the interests of mobile and online value added services in India. In May 2015, Saavn co-founder and president Vinodh Bhat was named as vice-chairman of IAMAI.

=== Switch to subscription-only service ===
Beginning November 2016, Saavn started moving to a paid-only model (except India), initially offering listening for free for 30 days and after that a monthly subscription fee of $4.99.

=== Saavn original programs ===
==== Saavn Artist in Residence ====
In 2016, Saavn launched its Artist In Residence (AiR) program with indie artist Nucleya.

==== Saavn Originals ====
Saavn later expanded its content offering into Saavn Original Programming, a slate of original, non-music audio programs that range from Bollywood to comedy and storytelling to cricket. Saavn's audio shows include No Filter Neha, Qisson ka Kona with Neelesh Misra, Trial by Error: The Aarushi Files, and Kahaani Express.

==== Saavn Verified Artists ====
Saavn verifies their authentic artists by providing a verification badge on their profiles.

==== Artist Originals ====
In early 2017, JioSaavn introduced Artist Originals (AO), an original music program releasing and marketing tracks and albums by South Asian artists, songwriters and producers from around the world. JioSaavn was the first streaming app to offer original audio programming in India. Indian hip-hop star Naezy, Toronto-based DJ Sickick, singer-songwriter Prateek Kuhad, U.K.-based independent artists Zack Knight and Jasmin Walia, electronic artist Sandunes, Canadian artist The PropheC, contemporary classical duo Shadow and Light and UK musician Raxstar have also launched songs under the Artist Originals program.

==== Spotted ====
Warner Music India and JioSaavn announced the launch of 'Spotted'- an artist discovery program. The program is designed to bring together the ecosystem that enables artists to reach their optimum potential. JioSaavn will collaborate with Warner Music India, to be able to release audio and video content. This partnership will create a stimulating environment for creators.

== See also ==
- Gaana
- Spotify
- Apple Music
- YouTube Music
