= Vaaste =

Single by Dhvani Bhanushali and Nikhil D'Souza
- Released: 6 April 2019
- Studio: Future Sound of Bombay
- Genre: Indian pop
- Length: 4:06
- Label: T-Series
- Composer: Tanishk Bagchi
- Lyricist: Arafat Mehmood
- Producer: Bhushan Kumar

Dhvani Bhanushali singles chronology
"Main Teri Hoon" (2019)	"Vaaste" (2019)

Music video
- "Vaaste" on YouTube

"Vaaste" is a Hindi song composed by Tanishk Bagchi with lyrics by Arafat Mehmood, performed by Dhvani Bhanushali and Nikhil D'Souza.

The song was released by T-Series on 6 April 2019 and produced by Bhushan Kumar. Its music video was directed by Radhika Rao and Vinay Sapru; features Siddharth Gupta.

== Reception ==
The song became popular within days of its release, and Dhvani Bhanushali claimed that it had had over 50 million views on YouTube in a week. It had been viewed 115 million times on YouTube by the end of April 2019.

It was declared the 10th most liked music video worldwide on YouTube for 2019 and was also featured in YouTube Rewind 2019.

== See also ==
- Bhula Dunga
- Lahore (song)
- Pasoori
