= DJ Shadow Dubai =

Indian disc jockey

- Also known as: Satheerth Kunneth
- Born: India
- Genres: Pop, Electronic dance music, Bollywood
- Occupations: Music Producer, DJ, Sound engineer,
- Years active: 2010–present
- Labels: Sony Music India, Zee Music Company, T-Series (company), Yash Raj Films
- Website: djshadowdubai.com

Satheerth Kunneth, better known by his stage name DJ Shadow Dubai, is a disc jockey and record producer currently residing in Dubai. He received recognition after his song Slowly Slowly, in collaboration with Guru Randhawa and Pitbull became popular on YouTube with 200+ million views on YouTube.

== Career ==
Shadow began his career at the early age, by Producing Tracks and performing in clubs, and later he started remixing official tracks for different Bollywood artists like Yo Yo Honey Singh, Arijit Singh, Diljit Dosanjh and many others across India which gained him popularity.

== Discography ==
=== Official Remixes ===
Year	Title	Artist
2007	Sona Family – Taali(DJ Shadow Dubai & Zoheb Remix)	
2008	Jay Sean – Tonight(DJ Shadow Dubai Remix)	Jay Sean
2008	Jay Sean ft Anushka Manchanda – Stay(DJ Shadow Dubai & Zoheb Remix)	Jay Sean
2008	Tigerstyle ft Raghav – Tired Of Love(DJ Shadow Dubai & DJ Dev Remix)	Tigerstyle
2008	Bharat Goel – Club Vich(DJ Shadow Dubai & DJ Dev Remix)	DJ Dev
2009	The Bilz & Kashif – Turn the Music up(DJ Shadow Dubai & DJ Dev Remix)	DJ Dev
2012	Ramji Gulati – Haseena Jeena(DJ Shadow Dubai & DJ Dev Remix)	Ramji Gulati
2016	Move Your Body ft Badshah / DJ Shadow Dubai	Badshah (rapper), Sean Paul
2016	Tumka ft.Flint J and Kay T / DJ Shadow Dubai	Flint J & Kay T
2016	Champagne Train - DJ Shadow Dubai feat Juggy D	Juggy D and D-Sync
2017	Jaan - DJ Shadow Dubai Remix	Alee Houston
2018	HDhami ft Rishi Rich – Sadke Java(DJ Shadow Dubai & Zoheb Remix)	H-Dhami, Rishi Rich
2018	Khwahishein	Bikram Singh (musician)
2018	Yaari Ve - Remix / Meet Bros feat. 'DJ Shadow Dubai, Prakriti, Lauren	Meet Bros
2018	Sanam Mennu (Remix)	Dj Shadow Dubai
2018	Bom Diggy / DJ Shadow Dubai Official Remix / Zack Knight X Jasmin Walia	Zack Knight, Jasmin Walia
2018	Harrdy Sandhu - Naah / DJ Shadow Remix	Harrdy Sandhu
2018	KAR HAR MAIDAAN FATEH / Sanju / Ranbir Kapoor / DJ Shadow Dubai	Ranbir Kapoor
2018	Lahore (song) Remix / Guru Randhawa / DJ Shadow Dubai	Guru Randhawa
2018	Thug Ranjha-DJ Shadow Dubai Remix	DJ Shadow Dubai
2018	Nazar Lag Jayegi DJ Shadow Dubai Remix	DJ Shadow Dubai
2018	Aaja Ni Aaja	Bohemia (rapper)
2019	Apna Bana Le Na	Shahzeb Tejani
2019	Space Train feat. Gaggan Mudgal	Gaggan Mudgal
2019	Slowly Slowly	Guru Randhawa, Pitbull (rapper)
2020	Kaise Hua DJ Shadow Dubai Remix (Kabir Singh)	Vishal Mishra (composer)

== Awards and recognition ==
- In the year 2018 Dj shadow won the Best Dj award at the Masala Award
- Got mentioned in the Guinness Book of World Records for having participated in the World's Biggest DJ Rally.
