= Siddharth Gupta =

Indian actor (born 1990)

- Born: 4 November 1990 (age 35); Dehradun, Uttarakhand, India
- Education: Engineering
- Occupations: Actor; Model
- Years active: 2014–present
- Notable work: Krishna in Krishnavataram Part 1: The Heart
- Height: 1.83 m (6 ft 0 in)
- Family: Vikas Gupta (brother)

Siddharth Gupta (born 4 November 1990) is an Indian actor and model. He is known for his role as lord "Krishna" in the film Krishnavataram Part 1: The Heart. He also appeared in the music video "Vaaste".

== Early life ==
Gupta grew up in Dehradun, Uttarakhand. His brother Vikas Gupta is a producer, screenwriter and creative director in the Hindi television industry. He initially studied engineering in Dubai; later relocated to Mumbai for an acting career, developing his skills in theatre.

== Career ==
In 2014, Gupta made his Hindi film debut in the comedy Kuku Mathur Ki Jhand Ho Gayi. He also hosted the show Pyaar Tune Kya Kiya season 7, alongside Niti Taylor. In 2017, he starred in ALTBalaji's Ragini MMS: Returns.

Gupta signed a three-film contract with Balaji Telefilms; however, due to the COVID-19 pandemic, it did not materialize. He was initially cast in Heeramandi but was replaced before production. Amid a series of shelved projects and fewer roles, he focused on modelling and appeared in multiple music videos. In 2019, he featured in Dhvani Bhanushali's music album "Vaaste"; the song has surpassed over 1.5 billion views on YouTube.

In 2026, Gupta achieved a breakthrough with his portrayal of the lead role lord "Krishna" in Hardik Gajjar's Hindi film directorial debut Krishnavataram Part 1: The Heart, which received positive reviews from critics.

== Filmography ==
=== Films ===
Year	Title	Role	Notes	Ref.
2014	Kuku Mathur Ki Jhand Ho Gayi	Kuku Mathur		
2020	Coffee	Siddharth	Short film	
2026	Krishnavataram Part 1: The Heart (Hridayam)	Krishna		
2027	Untitled next †	TBA	Filming	

=== Television ===
Year	Title	Role	Notes	Ref.
2014	MTV Jhand Hogi Sabki	Host	TV shows	
2016	Pyaar Tune Kya Kiya	Host	TV shows	
2017	Ragini MMS: Returns	Rahul	Web series	

=== Music videos appearances ===
Year	Title	Singer(s)	Ref.
2019	Vaaste	Dhvani Bhanushali; Nikhil D’Souza	
2020	Besharam Bewaffa	B Praak	
2020	Dil Na Todunga	Abhi Dutt	
2021	Kaise Juda Rahein	Stebin Ben; Sonna Rele	
2021	Dekhe Saare Khwaab	Ishaan Khan	
2021	Ek Bewafa	Sameer Khan	
2021	Is Tarah Aashiqui Ka	Dev Negi	
2023	Sexy In My Dress	Nora Fatehi	
2023	Mal Mal	B Praak	
2023	Kabhi Shaam Dhale	Mohammad Faiz	
2024	Main Yaad Aaunga	Stebin Ben	
