= Tara Mira =

Punjabi language romantic drama film

- First look poster
- Directed by: Rajiev Dhingra
- Screenplay by: Dheeraj Rattan
- Story by: Rajiev Dhingra
- Produced by: Guru Randhawa; Ashok Yadav; Rajiev Dhingra; Jyoti Sekhon; Shilpa Sharma
- Starring: Ranjit Bawa; Nazia Hussain
- Cinematography: Shani Bhushan Roy
- Edited by: Rohit Dhiman
- Music by: Guru Randhawa; Gurmeet Singh
- Production companies: 751 Films; Rapa Nui's Films; Yadu Production; Red Eyes Productions
- Distributed by: T-Series
- Release date: 11 October 2019
- Country: India
- Language: Punjabi

Tara Mira is a 2019 Indian Punjabi-language romantic drama film written and directed by Rajiev Dhingra and produced by Guru Randhawa, Ashok Yadav, Rajiev Dhingra, Jyoti Sekhon and Shilpa Sharma, under banners 751 Films, Rapa Nui's Films, Yadu Production and Red Eyes Productions. It stars Ranjit Bawa and Nazia Hussain in lead roles. It was released on 11 October 2019.

== Plot ==
Tara lives a modest life in Punjab with his father, a lighthearted and supportive figure. Tara falls in love with Mira, the daughter of Shingara Singh, a wealthy and politically powerful man known for his rigid views on social status and caste divisions. Shingara Singh is actively involved in a regional campaign to "purify" the culture and preserve traditional values, including opposing intercaste marriages.

Tara and Mira begin seeing each other in secret, aware that Shingara Singh would never approve of their relationship due to Tara's lower social and economic standing. With the help of his friend Ranjit, Tara devises a plan to win Shingara's approval: he disguises his background and pretends to be the son of an NRI businessman with strong political connections.

Initially, the plan works, and Shingara Singh considers Tara a suitable match for his daughter. However, as the façade begins to unravel, Tara finds himself in a moral conflict—torn between continuing the lie or coming clean to earn Mira's love through honesty. Meanwhile, Mira starts sensing something is amiss and struggles with the realization that her love might be built on deception.

As tensions rise, Tara's identity is exposed, leading to a dramatic confrontation with Shingara Singh. Mira must choose between her family's expectations and her feelings for Tara. In the end, after witnessing Tara's genuine character, honesty, and love for his daughter, Shingara Singh undergoes a change of heart and reluctantly gives the couple his blessing.

== Cast ==
- Ranjit Bawa as Tara Sing Brar
- Nazia Hussain as Mira Yadav
- Gurpreet Ghuggi as Advocate Tiwana
- Sudesh Lehri as Mira's father
- Yograj Singh as Sulakkhan Singh Brar
- Jhumma Mitra as Mira's mother
- Rajiv Thakur as Tara's friend Sharma
- Anita Devgan
- Shawindra Mahal
- Ashok Pathak as Kisna
- Mahavir Bhullar
- Guru Randhawa (cameo appearance)

== Production ==
Tara Mira was officially announced on 30 June 2019, with Ranjit Bawa and Nazia Hussain cast in the lead roles. It was directed by Rajiev Dhingra and produced by Guru Randhawa, Ashok Yadav, Rajiev Dhingra, Jyoti Sekhon, and Shilpa Sharma.

== Release ==
Tara Mira was released on 11 October 2019.

== Soundtrack ==
Tara Mira

Soundtrack album by Gurmeet Singh, Guru Randhawa, Vee, Balli Kassi, Ikwinder Singh, & Jay K (Jassi Katyal)
- Recorded: 2019
- Genre: Feature film soundtrack
- Length: 19:18 (Album Version = 16:16)
- Language: Punjabi
- Label: T-Series

The soundtrack of the film was composed by Gurmeet Singh, Guru Randhawa, Balli Kassi, Ikwinder Singh, Jay K (Jassi Katyal), and Vee. The lyrics were written by Bunny Johal, Money K, Ravi Raj, Happy Raikoti, and Guru Randhawa.

Track listing
No.	Title	Lyrics	Music	Singer(s)	Length
1.	"Kalgi"	Bunny Johal	Gurmeet Singh	Mannat Noor	3:13
2.	"Ik Gera (Promotional song)"	Guru Randhawa	Guru Randhawa, Vee	Guru Randhawa	3:02
3.	"Tara Mira (Title Track)"	Bunny Johal, Money K	Balli Kassi	Nabeel Shaukat Ali	3:54
4.	"Jattan Wali"	Happy Raikoti	Ikwinder Singh	Ranjit Bawa	3:27
5.	"Viyah Di Cha"	Ravi Raj	Jay K (Jassi Katyal)	Ranjit Bawa	3:36
6.	"Main Tera Tara Tu Meri Mira"	Guru Randhawa	Vee	Guru Randhawa	2:04
