= Saiee Manjrekar =

Indian actress (born 2001)

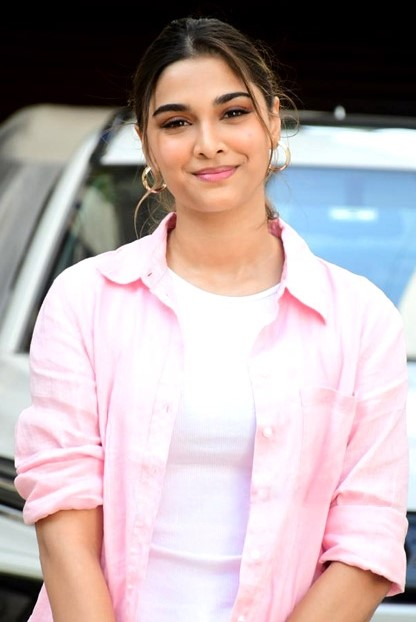
- Manjrekar in 2025
- Born: 24 December 2001 (age 24); Mumbai, Maharashtra, India
- Education: University of Mumbai
- Occupation: Actress
- Years active: 2019–present
- Parent(s): Mahesh Manjrekar (father); Medha Manjrekar (mother)

Saiee Manjrekar (born 24 December 2001) is an Indian actress who works in Telugu and Hindi films. The daughter of actors Mahesh Manjrekar and Medha Manjrekar, she made her acting debut with Dabangg 3 (2019). Manjrekar has since appeared in the Telugu films Ghani (2022), Major (2022) and Skanda (2023).

== Early life ==
Manjrekar was born 24 December 2001 to film actors Medha and Mahesh Manjrekar.

== Career ==
Manjrekar made her film debut with a brief appearance as Kushi Damle in the Marathi film Kaksparsh (2012). She did her first leading role as Khushi Chautala in the 2019 Hindi action-comedy Dabangg 3 opposite Salman Khan. The film received negative reviews from critics, and its commercial prospects were affected by the CAA protests. It earned her a nomination for Filmfare Award for Best Female Debut. In 2020, she appeared in the music video for the song "Manjha", alongside Aayush Sharma.

In 2022, Manjrekar made her Telugu film debut alongside Varun Tej in Ghani, which ended up being a commercial failure. She was next featured in the Telugu-Hindi bilingual biographical action film Major, a biopic of Sandeep Unnikrishnan (played by Adivi Sesh), in which she played the role of Isha Agarwal who is Unnikrishnan's love interest. The film received critical acclaim and became one of the highest grossing Telugu films of 2022.

Manjrekar was next appeared in Kuch Khattaa Ho Jaay opposite Guru Randhawa.

== In the media ==
Manjrekar was ranked 47th in the Times Most Desirable Women List in 2019.

== Filmography ==
=== Films ===
Key
†	Denotes film or TV productions that have not yet been released

Year	Title	Role	Language	Notes	Ref.
2012	Kaksparsh	Kushi Damle	Marathi	Child artist	
2019	Dabangg 3	Khushi	Hindi		
2022	Ghani	Maya	Telugu		
2022	Major	Isha	Telugu; Hindi	Bilingual film	
2023	Skanda	Parineeta	Telugu		
2024	Kuch Khattaa Ho Jaay	Ira Mishra	Hindi		
2024	Auron Mein Kahan Dum Tha	Young Vasudha	Hindi		
2025	Arjun Son of Vyjayanthi	Chitra	Telugu		

=== Music videos ===
Year	Title	Singer(s)	Ref.
2020	"Manjha"	Vishal Mishra	
2022	"Duniya"	B Praak	

== Awards and nominations ==
Year	Award	Category	Work	Result	Ref.
2020	Filmfare Awards	Best Female Debut	Dabangg 3	Nominated	
2020	Zee Cine Awards	Best Female Debut	Dabangg 3	Nominated	
2020	ETC Bollywood Business Awards	Highest Grossing Debut Actress	Dabangg 3	Won	
2023	Bollywood Hungama Style Icons	Most Stylish Breakthrough Talent (Female)	—N/a	Nominated	
2023	South Indian International Movie Awards	Best Female Debut – Telugu	Ghani	Nominated	

== See also ==
- List of Hindi film actresses
