= Stebin Ben =

Indian singer (born 1993)

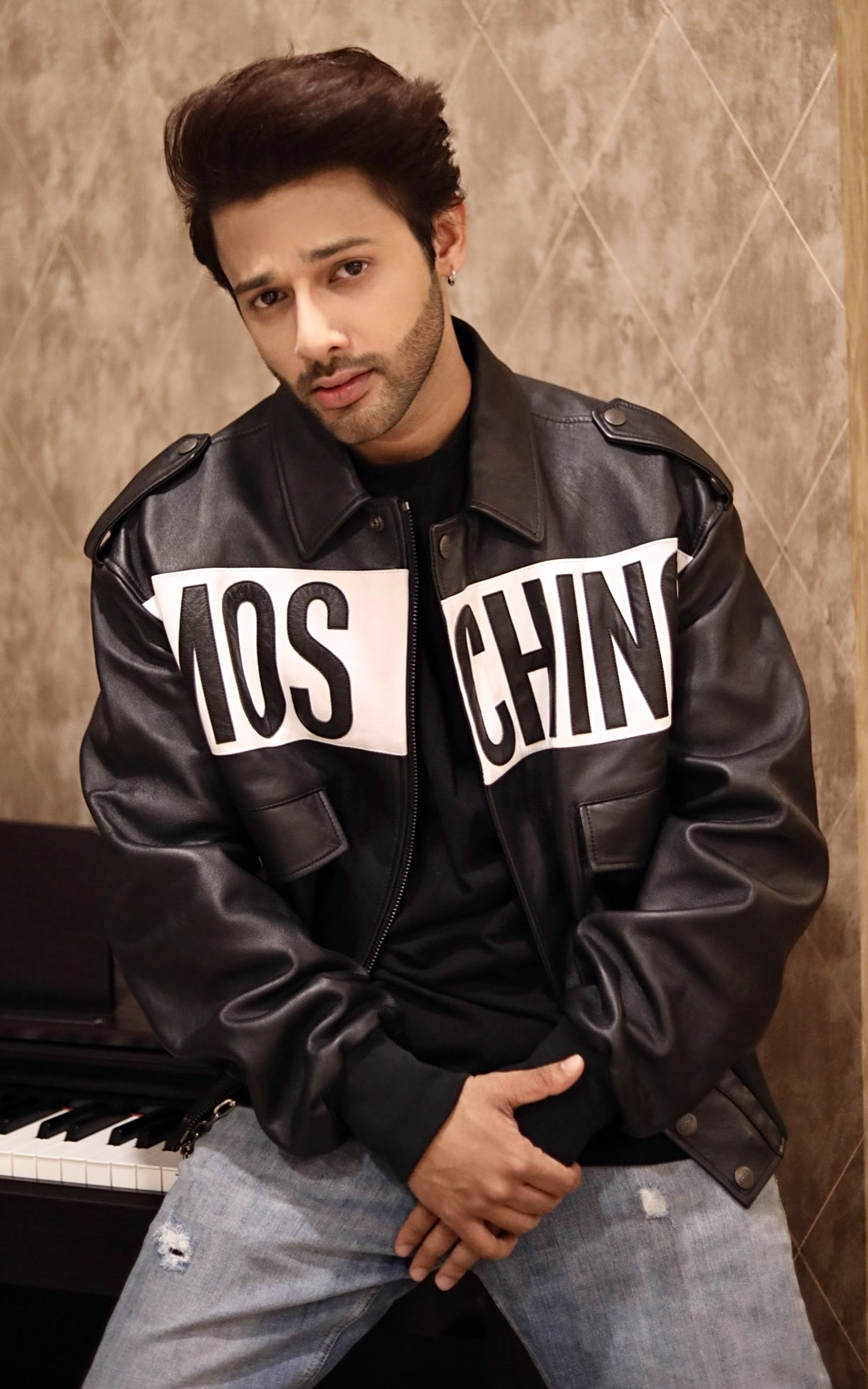

Background information
- Born: 9 March 1993 (age 33); Bhopal, Madhya Pradesh, India
- Genres: Pop, Indie Rock
- Occupations: Playback Singer; POP Singer; Live Performer
- Instruments: Vocals, guitar, piano
- Labels: T-Series; Hitz Music; Zee Music Company; Desi Music Factory; Sony Music India; Desi Melodies; Tips Music; Venus Music; VYRL Originals
- Spouse: Nupur Sanon (m. 2026)

Stebin Ben (born 9 March 1993) is an Indian playback singer, pop singer and live performer. He is recognised for his versatile singing and melodious voice and has worked with some of the notable music directors and actors in Bollywood. Stebin Ben reached the masses with his viral songs Sahiba, Thoda Thoda Pyaar, Rula Ke Gaya Ishq and few more. He performed at Anant Ambani's pre-wedding celebrations and sangeet ceremony, which created a lot of buzz.

He is a popular wedding performer with more than 1,000 shows all across the world.

== Career ==
Stebin Ben got his breakthrough in the year 2021 with his first ever viral song Thoda Thoda Pyaar featuring Sidharth Malhotra in 2021 which became the most streamed Hindi song of 2021. He collaborated with lot of film stars and gave voice to Vijay Deverakonda, Akshay Kumar, Emraan Hashmi, Shahid Kapoor, Siddharth Malhotra and many more. Stebin's song Sahiba not just became the number 1 song on Spotify India but also entered the global Top charts.

Stebin also collaborated with Shreya Ghoshal, Sachin-Jigar, Himesh Reshammiya, Meet Bros for various singing projects.

Along with Playback Singing, Stebin regularly performs Live at various wedding events, corporate shows, college festivals and more throughout the year, across the globe.

== Early life ==
Stebin Ben was born on 8 March 1993 to Malayali Christian family settled in Bhopal. Stebin Ben belongs to a middle-class family and he decided to pursue his dream of becoming a singer from school itself. Completing his education from Carmel Convent Co-Ed School, Ben later moved to Mumbai in the year 2017 to pursue his career in singing.

== Personal life ==
Ben has been in a relationship with Indian actress Nupur Sanon since 2021. In January 2026, the couple announced their engagement after Ben proposed to Sanon. The couple married in Udaipur on 10 January 2026 in Christian and Hindu ceremonies.

== Discography ==
=== Singles and covers ===
Year	Track	Artist(s)	Music composer(s)	Lyricist	Label
2018	Mera Dil Bhi Kitna Pagal Hai	Himself			
2019	Sajda Karu	Asad Khan			Zee Music Company
2019	Mera Mehboob	Kausar Jamot			Zee Music Company
2019	Humein Bharat Kehte Hai	Sunny Inder			Zee Music Company
2019	Rula ke Gaya Ishq	Sunny Inder			Zee Music Company
2019	Tik Tok	Sunny Inder			Zee Music Company
2020	Bhula Na Teri Baatein	Anjjan Bhattacharya			Zee Music Company
2020	Baarish	Himself and Payal Dev	Payal Dev		VYRL Originals
2020	Afsos Karoge	Himself	Sanjeev-Ajay		Desi Music Factory
2020	Juda Kar Diya	Himself	Himself		Desi Music Factory
2021	Naina Tu Behna Tu	Himself	Jeet Gannguli		Zee Music Company
2021	Qatra	Himself	-		Sony Music India
2021	Kaise Juda Rahein ft. Sonna Rele	Himself	Prem & Hardeep		Sony Music India
2021	Thoda Thoda Pyaar	Himself	Nilesh Ahuja		Zee Music Company
2021	Tum Bewafa Ho	Himself and Payal Dev	Payal Dev		DRJ Records
2021	Baarish Ban Jaana	Himself and Payal Dev	Payal Dev		VYRL Originals
2021	Jannat Ve Darshan raval	Himself, Danish Sabri and Aishwarya Pandit	Meet Bros		Zee Music Company
2021	Jabb Se Tumko Dekhaa (from the album Himesh Ke Dil Se)	Himself	Himesh Reshammiya		Himesh Reshammiya Melodies
2021	Mehendi Lagi	Himself	Nilesh Ahuja		Zee Music Company
2021	Leja Leja Re Mahi	Himself	Kausar Jamot		Zee Music Company
2021	Farq Nahi Padta	Himself	Avvy Sra		Orrange Studioz
2021	Pyaar Karte Ho Na	Himself and Shreya Ghoshal	Javed-Mohsin		VYRL Originals
2021	Sirf Tu	Himself and Danish Sabri	Raees, Zain		Zee Music Company
2021	Mohabbat Hai	Himself	Jeet Gannguli		VYRL Originals
2021	O Dilbar Yaara	Himself	Harish Sagane		NAV Records
2021	Samajh Na Paaogey	Himself	Anjjan Bhattacharya		Zee Music Company
2022	Mohabbat Main Toh Karta Hoon	Himself and Srishti Bhandari	Amjad Nadeem Aamir		Zee Music Company
2022	Jiye Toh Jiye Kaise 2.0	Himself	Sanjeev-Ajay		Venus Records & Tapes
2022	Humnava	Himself	Sanjeev-Ajay		Voilà! Digi
2022	Ek Tu Hi Toh Hai	Himself	Aman Pant		Sony Music India
2022	Yaar Ki Mehfil	Himself	Kunaal Vermaa		White Hill Beats
2022	Tutt Gaya	Himself	Gourov Dasgupta		Saregama
2022	Jaana	Himself and Kamya Chaudhary	Jaani		Desi Melodies & Azeem Dayani
2022	Dua Karo	Himself	Siddharth Kasyap	Kumaar	SK Music Works
2022	Tujme Main Saans Loon	Himself	Sadhu.S.Tiwari		Panorama Music
2023	Teri Yaadein	Himself and Jasmin Bhasin	Sunny Inder		Zee Music Company
2023	Tu Mile Dil Khile	Himself and Asees Kaur	Lijo George-Dj Chetas		Saregama Music
2023	Kaash	Himself	Aslam Keyi		Venus Originals
2023	Majbooriyaan	Himself	Salim-Sulaiman		Merchant Records
2023	Pyaar Mein	Himself	Bharat Goel		T Series
2023	Rista Rista	Himself	Gourov Dasgupta		Saregama Music
2023	Ishq Da Dariyaa	Himself	Prem & Hardeep		Jjust Music
2023	Barsaat Aa Gayi	Himself and Shreya Ghoshal	Javed-Mohsin		VYRL Originals
2023	Sanam Aa Gaya	Himself and Payal Dev	Payal Dev		DRJ Records
2023	Ishq Ka Asar	Himself and Yogita Bihani	Zain-Sam & Raees	Vishu Srivastava	Hitz Music
2023	Jaane Jaa	Himself & Asees Kaur	Sooraj Pancholi and Nimrit Ahluwalia	Vishu Srivastava	VYRLOriginals
2024	Tumhari Mohabbat	Himself and Chinmayi Sripada	Javed-Mohsin		DRJ Records
2024	Chahun	Himself and Neeti Mohan	Sunny Vik		VYRL Originals

=== Films ===
Year	Title	Song	Composer	Co-singer	Lyricist	Language
2018	Race 3	"Selfish (Solo)"	Vishal Mishra	Solo	Salman Khan	Hindi
2019	Hotel Mumbai	"Humein Bharat Kehte Hain"	Sunny and Inder Bawra	Solo		Hindi
2020	Shimla Mirchi	"Ishq Di Feeling"	Meet Bros Anjjan		Kumaar	Hindi
2021	Sanak	"O Yaara Dil Lagana"	Chirantan Bhatt	Deeksha Toor	Sameer, Manoj Yadav	Hindi
2022	Jersey	"Baliye Re"	Sachet–Parampara	Sachet Tandon, Parampara Tandon	Shellee	Hindi
2022	Nikamma	"Nasha Ishq Ka"	Vipin Patwa	Neha Karode	Kumaar	Hindi
2022	Judaa Hoke Bhi	"Judaa Hoke Bhi"	Puneet Dixit	Solo	Shweta Bothra	Hindi
2022	Judaa Hoke Bhi	"Mera Naseeb Ho"	Amjad-Nadeem Amir, Chote Baba	Solo	Shakeel Azmi	Hindi
2022	Raksha Bandhan	"Raksha Bandhan (Reprise)"	Himesh Reshammiya	Shreya Ghoshal	Irshad Kamil	Hindi
2022	Toke Chhara Banchbo Na	"Title Track"	Jeet Gannguli	Solo	Prasenjit Mukherjee (Prasen)	Bengali
2023	Selfiee	"Deewaane"	Tanishk Bagchi, Aditya Yadav	Altamash Faridi, Aditya Yadav	Kunaal Verma, Aditya Yadav	Hindi
2023	Mission Raniganj	"Jeetenge (Reprise)"	Arko Pravo Mukherjee		Kumar Vishwas	Hindi
2024	Dedh Bigha Zameen	"Zidd Na Karo"	Rochak Kohli, Sohail Rana	Solo	Manoj Muntashir, Faiyaz Hashmi	Hindi
2025	Fateh	"Ruaa Ruaa"	Haroon–Gavin	Rupali Moghe	Mandeep Khurana	Hindi
2025	Baaghi 4	"Tera Khayal"	Siddhaant Miishhraa	Solo	Sameer Anjaan	Hindi
2025	Mannu Kya ? Karegga	Gulfam	Lalit Pandit	Solo		Hindi
2025	Mastiii 4	"Daga"	Meet Bros	Meet Bros, Saaj Bhatt, Danish Sabri	Danish Sabri	Hindi
2026	Hai Jawani Toh Ishq Hona Hai	"Tera Ho Jaun"	White Noise Collectives	Jonita Gandhi	Vayu Shrivastav	Hindi

== Awards and recognition ==
In September 2018, he was awarded Best Bollywood Artist of the year at India Nightlife Awards 2018. He is the winner of T-Series StageWorks's singing contest The Stage in 2016. In October 2014, Stebin Ben won the Best Performance Award at MTV Asia's Project Aloft Star India (season 1).

- 2014: Stebin Ben won the Best Performance Award at MTV Asia's Project Aloft Star India (season 1)
- 2016: Winner of T-Series StageWorks's singing contest The Stage in 2016
- 2018: Best Bollywood Artist of the year at India Nightlife Awards 2018
- 2021: Best Playback Singer for International Iconic Awards
- 2021: Iconic Voice of the year at Iconic Gold Awards
- 2021: Best Live Entertainers for weddings at WeddingSutra Influencer Awards 2021
- 2021: Best Voice of the year at Universal India Awards
- 2021: Most Replayed Indie Artist at Jio Saavn's Replayer Awards
- 2022: Iconic singing sensation of the year Male at Iconic Gold Awards
- 2022: Most popular singing sensation of the year at India Influencer Iconic Awards 2022
- 2023: MTV Beats Artist of the Month in August 2023
- 2023: Most stylish performer at Lokmat Awards 2023
- 2024: Star of the night at EMIGALA Awards Dubai
- 2024: Best live performer at Iconic Gold Awards 2024
- 2024: Best playback singer critic choice at International Iconic Awards

== See also ==
- List of people from Madhya Pradesh
