= Tere Te =

Single by Guru Randhawa ft.Ikka

Single by Guru Randhawa ft.Ikka
- Genre: Punjabi pop
- Length: 3:13 (Music video); 3:08 (Audio)
- Label: T-Series
- Composers: Guru Randhawa & Ikka
- Lyricist: Ikka
- Producers: Guru Randhawa, Vee Music, Abhijit Vaghani

Music video
- "Tere Te" on YouTube

"Tere Te" is a Punjabi pop single by Guru Randhawa featuring Ikka Singh, released on 26 November 2018 by T-Series.

== Background ==
The song is sung by Guru Randhawa and Ikka Singh, penned by Ikka Singh and Music by Guru Randhawa, Vee Music & Abhijit Vaghani. Music video also features Zaara Yesmin, Released on 26 November 2018 by T-Series via YouTube and other music streaming services. Song Assisted by Vatsal Chevli @headroom Studio.

In an interview; Guru Randhawa reveals: “We shot this song in a Mumbai studio with special VFX for the first time.”

== Reception ==
The song's music video got 33 million views in 24 hours of its release.
