= Ishare Tere =

Single by Guru Randhawa and Dhvani

Single by Guru Randhawa and Dhvani Bhanushali
- Language: Punjabi; Hindi; English
- Released: 24 July 2018
- Studio: T-Series Recording Studio
- Genre: Indian pop; Bhangra; Indian hip-hop
- Length: 3:20 (Music video); 3:09 (Audio)
- Label: T-Series
- Songwriters: Guru Randhawa; Apeksha Dandekar
- Producer: Guru Randhawa

Music video
- "Ishare Tere" on YouTube

"Ishare Tere" (transl. Your gestures) is a Punjabi song by Guru Randhawa and debutant Dhvani Bhanushali, which was released as a single by T-Series on 24 July 2018.

== Music video ==
The music video of the song was released on 24 July 2018 by T-Series on YouTube. It crossed 15 million views in 24 hours of its release. The song was assisted by Vatsal Chevli @Headroom Studio. It is another hit song by Guru Randhawa and has crossed 800 million views.

== Reception ==
The song was well received by the audience and both singers were praised. Song was cited in media as Party anthem of the year. The Song reached No.3 On UK Asian Music Charts
