= Major (film) =

2022 film directed by Sashi Kiran Tikka

- Theatrical release poster
- Directed by: Sashi Kiran Tikka
- Written by: Adivi Sesh
- Dialogues by: Abburi Ravi Akshat Ajay Sharma
- Based on: The life of Major Sandeep Unnikrishnan
- Produced by: Mahesh Babu; Namrata Shirodkar; Anurag Reddy; Sharath Chandra
- Starring: Adivi Sesh; Prakash Raj; Revathi; Saiee Manjrekar; Sobhita Dhulipala; Murali Sharma; Anish Kuruvilla
- Cinematography: Vamsi Patchipulusu
- Edited by: Vinay Kumar Sirigineedi; Kodati Pavan Kalyan
- Music by: Sricharan Pakala
- Production companies: Sony Pictures International Productions; G. Mahesh Babu Entertainment; A+S Movies
- Distributed by: Sony Pictures Releasing International
- Release dates: 24 May 2022 (Limited); 3 June 2022
- Running time: 146 minutes
- Country: India
- Languages: Telugu; Hindi
- Budget: ₹32 crore
- Box office: ₹64−66 crore

Major is a 2022 Indian biographical action drama film directed by Sashi Kiran Tikka and written by Adivi Sesh. Based on the life of Major Sandeep Unnikrishnan who was martyred in action in the 26/11 attacks, it stars Sesh in the titular role as Unnikrishnan with Prakash Raj, Sobhita Dhulipala, Saiee Manjrekar, Revathi, Murali Sharma, and Anish Kuruvilla. Major is produced by G. Mahesh Babu Entertainment, Sony Pictures International Productions, and A+S Movies.

Produced as a Telugu film, it was shot simultaneously in Telugu and Hindi languages, and follows the personal and professional life of Sandeep Unnikrishnan. Principal photography began in February 2020 and ended in December 2021. Filming experienced delays owing to the COVID-19 pandemic. Made on a budget of ₹32 crores, it was shot in 120 days and was filmed in over 75 locations.

Major had limited theatrical release on 24 May 2022 in selected cities across India and it was released worldwide on 3 June 2022. The film received critical acclaim from critics praising the direction, screenplay, writing, emotional weight, score, cinematography, action sequences, and cast performances (particularly that of Sesh) and eventually became a commercial success grossing ₹64−66 crore worldwide, emerging as one of the highest grossing Telugu films of 2022. The Hindi version is featured at the 53rd International Film Festival of India in the Indian Panorama section. In addition to being filmed in Telugu and Hindi, the film was also dubbed in Malayalam. It also won the Gaddar Telangana Film Award for Third Best Feature Film.

== Plot ==
Major Sandeep Unnikrishnan enters Azad Jammu and Kashmir, which the Pakistani Army considers a threat and so orders him to retreat. When questioned by the Indian Army officials on why he did it and that the area belongs to Pakistan, he replies, "it is ours". Young Sandeep grows up with his sister, Sandhya, and his parents Unnikrishnan and Dhanalakshmi, in Yelahanka, Bangalore. As a child, he was very curious about the world around him. When Unnikrishnan took him to see a Navy ceremony with military airplanes flying in the sky Sandeep developed an early fascination with the life of a soldier. In his later years as a secondary school student, Sandeep falls in love with his classmate, Isha. Sandeep applied to join the Indian Navy without telling his parents, much to the fury of Unnikrishnan. However, the Navy rejected Sandeep's application, causing Sandeep to train at the National Defence Academy and ultimately join the Indian Army. As the years progressed, Sandeep rises through the ranks to become an NSG training officer.

In 2008, Sandeep is well established in his career as a training officer for the 51 Special Action Group of the NSG and is married to Isha, but their marriage is in trouble. Sandeep asks for leave to try and save his marriage. On the same day as Sandeep's leave though, Pakistani terrorists arrive in Mumbai by boat and they proceed to orchestrate deadly attacks in the city. Desperately crowds start heading to the Taj Hotel for safety but the terrorists also enter the hotel and start shooting at staff and guests spontaneously. The local police are called to the scene but they are ill-equipped to deal with the threat. Upon discovering the terrorist attacks in Mumbai, Sandeep requests Commander Shera to allow him to participate in the NSG mission to neutralize the terrorist threat. They leave for Mumbai and commence the military counterterrorism operation: Operation Black Tornado, but the NSG encounters numerous obstacles and problems upon arriving at the scene. They lack surveillance cameras to discover the number of people inside the building.

The terrorists have installed deadly booby traps and tripwires with bombs throughout the premises. Several hotel staff and guests end up crowded together in a locked room, all bound and gagged on the floor. To make matters worse there is an intrusive media circus swarming outside the hotel reporting the NSG's known operations and movements, information which the terrorists use. Meanwhile, a guest named Pramoda Reddy, who is trapped on the fifth floor, manages to keep herself hidden from the gunmen. She ultimately takes responsibility to rescue a British tourist's young daughter, named Shirley. Sandeep talks to Isha over the phone. She is applying for divorce and scolds Sandeep for not being there with her when she had a miscarriage, but she is horrified when she discovers that Sandeep is at the Taj Hotel. As the NSG rescue more hostages (several of whom remain tied up inside a locked banquet hall) and starts closing in on the remaining terrorists, Pramoda calls the downstairs lobby using a walkie-talkie from one of the dead security guards.

Sandeep ultimately decides to go to the 5th floor to save them, saying that he would never be able to forgive himself if he did not save her. His colleagues subsequently use tear gas and Sandeep races up to the 5th floor. He ultimately rescues Pramoda and Shirley and heroically kills almost all of the terrorists single-handedly but is shot and stabbed multiple times in the process. However, when Shera asks him whether he needs reinforcement or not, he refuses. His last words are "do not come up, I will handle them." But as fate would have it, he finally dies from his wounds, all alone, laying down his life for his country. Major Sandeep's parents watch in horror as the news coverage shows that Sandeep was killed in action. They had thought that since Sandeep was a training officer he was not involved in the rescue mission at the Taj Hotel. After his death, there is a large military funeral and a crowd of well-wishers gather to mourn Sandeep's passing. Isha is devastated at Sandeep's death and discovers that he never signed the divorce papers. Later, a 10-year commemoration ceremony in 2018 honoring the lives taken during the attack is held at the Taj Hotel. During the commemorations, Pramoda is reunited with Shirley whose life she had saved. Mr. Unnikrishnan gives an impassioned speech in which he says that Sandeep should be remembered not for how he died, but for how he lived.

As Unnikrishnan recalls during his speech, a flashback shows the continuation of the beginning of the film. It is shown that Sandeep was playing cricket with the children from PoK, and when he was called back, he waves goodbye and promises the children that he would come to play another time.

== Cast ==
- Adivi Sesh as Major Sandeep Unnikrishnan
  - Amancharla Rama Kausik as young Sandeep
- Prakash Raj as K. Unnikrishnan
- Revathi as Dhanalakshmi Unnikrishnan
- Sobhita Dhulipala as Pramoda Reddy
- Saiee Manjrekar as Isha, Sandeep’s wife (technically because he died before court proceedings) (based on Neha, Maj. Sandeep Unnikrishnan's wife) (Note: A critic credited her full name as "Isha Agarwal", though her though her last name is never mentioned in the narrative.)
- Murali Sharma as Colonel and Team Commander Shera
- Anish Kuruvilla as Rodriguez
- Greeshma Prudhivi as Sandhya Unnikrishnan
- Chanakya Tejas as NSG Captain Aakash
- Abhinav Singh Raghav as NDA batchmate Harsh
- Veeru Madimetla as NDA batchmate Veer
- K Vineet Chandra as terrorist Kasab
- Rocky Gondle as terrorist Ali
- Varun Gyanchandani as Zaki
- Gaurav Manak as terrorist leader Hafeez
- Rajnish Sharma as TV News Reader

== Production ==
=== Development ===
Sony Pictures Entertainment has registered two titles, Major and Major Sandeep with the producers' association, in their endeavour to make a biopic on his life. The studio entered talks with the family of Major Sandeep in January 2019 to get the rights with an aim to pay tribute to the soldier's life. The film was announced in February 2019, with Adivi Sesh in the lead role. The film is produced by actor Mahesh Babu under his studio G. Mahesh Babu Entertainment, in collaboration with Sony Pictures International Productions and A+S Movies. Major is shot simultaneously in Telugu and Hindi languages. Despite consisting of a predominantly Telugu cast and crew, director Sashi Kiran Tikka said that they opted to shoot the film in Hindi as well since the film is set in North India where Hindi is the dominant language.

=== Filming ===
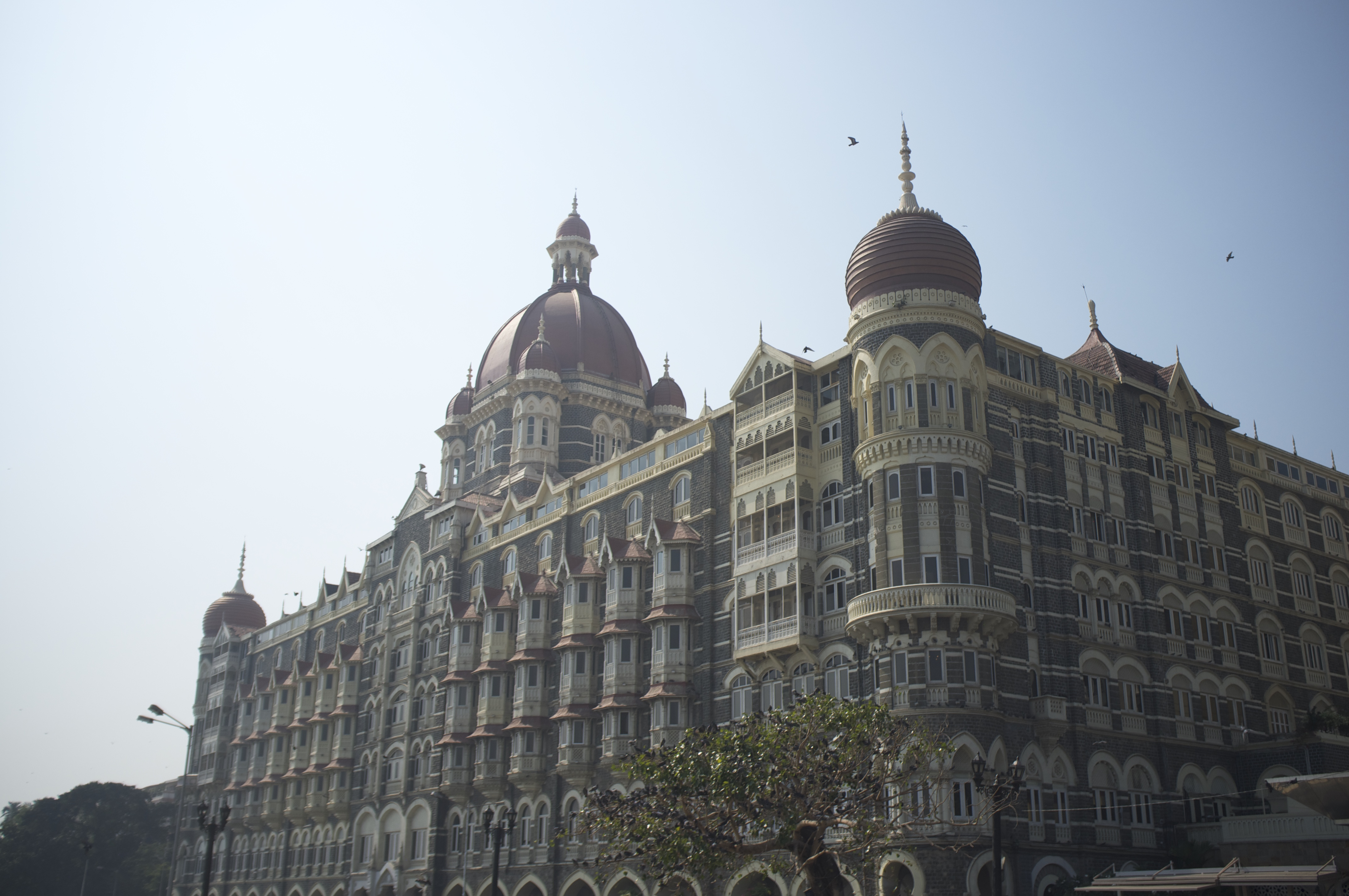
Part of the film was shot at Taj Mahal Palace Hotel, Mumbai

Principal photography began in February 2020. But the filming was put on hold in March 2020 due to the COVID-19 pandemic in India. By September 2020, more than 50% of the film had been shot, and further shooting planned to take place in Hyderabad in October 2020. Sobhita Dhulipala filming completed her portions in November 2020. In August 2021, Sesh began filming the final schedule of the film. In December 2021, the shooting of the film was completed and the post-production work began with Sesh dubbing for the Hindi version. Major was shot in 120 days and was filmed in over 75 locations.

== Music ==
Major

Soundtrack album by Sricharan Pakala
- Released: 6 June 2022
- Recorded: 2020–2022
- Genre: Feature film soundtrack
- Length: 14:27
- Languages: Telugu; Hindi
- Label: Zee Music Company
- Producer: Sricharan Pakala

Sricharan Pakala chronology
DJ Tillu (2022)	Major (2022)	Itlu Maredumilli Prajaneekam (2022)

The film score and soundtrack album of the film is composed by Sricharan Pakala. The music rights were acquired by the Zee Music Company. The first single titled "Hrudyama" was released on 6 January 2022. The second single titled "Oh Isha" was released on 18 May 2022.

Telugu
No.	Title	Lyrics	Singer(s)	Length
1.	"Hrudayama"	Krishna Kanth, V.N.V. Ramesh Kumar	Sid Sriram	3:34
2.	"Oh Isha"	Rajiv Bharadwaj	Armaan Malik, Chinmayi	3:06
3.	"Jana Gana Mana"	Rajiv Bharadwaj	Tojan Toby	4:04
4.	"Kanna Kanna"	Ramajogayya Sastry	K. S. Chithra	3:42
Total length:				14:27

Hindi
No.	Title	Lyrics	Singer(s)	Length
1.	"Saathiya"	Ritesh Rajwada	Javed Ali	3:34
2.	"Oh Isha"	Poojan Kohli	Armaan Malik, Chinmayi	3:06
3.	"Jana Gana Mana"	Yash Eshwari	Amit Mishra, Sricharan Pakala	4:04
4.	"Mere Laalna"	Ritesh Rajwada	K. S. Chithra	3:42
Total length:				14:27

== Release ==
=== Theatrical ===
Major had limited theatrical release starting from 24 May 2022 with special pre-release screenings in selected cities across India including Delhi, Lucknow, Jaipur, Ahmedabad, Mumbai, Pune, Hyderabad, Vishakapatnam, Bangalore, and Kochi. Major was theatrically released worldwide on 3 June 2022 in Telugu, Hindi, and Malayalam languages. Earlier, it was supposed to release on 2 July 2021 but was deferred to the COVID-19 pandemic. Later, the release was rescheduled for 11 February 2022, but the release date was postponed due to uncertainty prevailing about the reopening of cinemas due to the Omicron variant spread. Later in February 2022, the film was rescheduled to release on 27 May 2022 before being pushed back to 3 June.

Major has undergone pre-release theatrical business of 15 crore excluding the Hindi belt.

=== Home media ===
The digital distribution rights were acquired by Netflix in all languages and the film was digitally streamed on Netflix from 3 July 2022. and the satellite rights of the Hindi and Telugu version were sold to Sony Max and Gemini TV respectively.

== Reception ==
=== Critical reception ===
Major received positive reviews from critics. On the review aggregator website Rotten Tomatoes, 75% of 8 critics' reviews are positive, with an average rating of 5.9/10.

Neeshita Nyayapati of The Times of India rated the film 3.5 out of 5 stars and wrote: "Major might be an action drama for the most part where guns and bombs become the norm after a certain run-time, but the film does a good job of opting for a personal tone instead of a jingoistic one." Swati Chopra of The Quint rated the film 3.5 out of 5 stars and wrote, "Adivi essays the role of a Major almost effortlessly. The screenplay and direction work for the film. This action-drama is not preachy, and the film does not lead with a patriotic tone." A critic for Deccan Chronicle rated the film 3.5 out of 5 stars and wrote, "Major movie is a fitting tribute to Major Sandeep Unnikrishnan. It's a classic film version of a story that deserves to be told!" Manoj Kumar R of The Indian Express rated the film 3 out of 5 stars and wrote, "Major is far from being perfect. Nevertheless, it's an effective homage to the hero of 26/11."

Leslie Felperin of The Guardian rated the film 3 out of 5 stars and wrote, "A hero of the 2008 Mumbai hotel siege gets a relentlessly entertaining biopic, going all-out with the hagiographic bells and whistles." Mayank Shekhar of Mid-Day rated the film 3 out of 5 stars and wrote, "It recreates 26/11 with just enough creative liberties to remain believable still. It moves you, with a fine measure of empathy and patriotism." Sukanya Verma (Suku) of Rediff rated the film 2.5 out of 5 stars and wrote, "Major is in a perennial state of exaggeration. The sighs, the misty eyes, the mushy speeches, its details are invested in highlighting all things in-your-face."

=== Box office ===
Major grossed ₹64–66 crore gross worldwide. The film amassed a distributor share of ₹33.35 crore and emerged a blockbuster at the box office.

On its opening day, Major grossed ₹13.10 crore with a distributor's share of ₹7.12 crore. According to trade analyst Taran Adarsh, the film made a net collection of ₹4.66 crore domestically from the Hindi version in its first weekend. As of 10 June 2022 the film grossed ₹50.7 crore (US$5.3 million). After 13 days of its release, the film grossed ₹60 crore worldwide as reported by The Times of India.

== Accolades ==
Ceremony	Award	Category	Nominee	Result	Ref.
2023	South Indian International Movie Awards	Best Actor Critics – Telugu	Adivi Sesh	Won	
2023	South Indian International Movie Awards	Best Debut Producer	A+S Movies (Sharath Chandra, Anurag Mayreddy)	Won	
2023	South Indian International Movie Awards	Gaddar Telangana Film Awards	Best Feature Film	Won	
2023	South Indian International Movie Awards	Best Film – Telugu	G. Mahesh Babu Entertainment; Sony Pictures International Releasing	Nominated	
2023	South Indian International Movie Awards	Best Director – Telugu	Sashi Kiran Tikka	Nominated	
2023	South Indian International Movie Awards	Best Supporting Actress – Telugu	Sobhita Dhulipala	Nominated	
2023	South Indian International Movie Awards	Best Cinematographer – Telugu	Vamsi Patchipulusu	Nominated	
