= Life Is Beautiful (2014 film) =

- Promotional Poster
- Directed by: Manoj Amarnani
- Produced by: M.A.A. Productions
- Distributed by: Shotformats Digital Production
- Release date: 22 August 2014
- Country: India
- Language: Hindi

Life Is Beautiful is a 2014 Bollywood film that was directed by Manoj Amarnani, who also starred in the movie. The film was released in India on 22 August 2014 and stars Nancy Brunetta as Amarnani's co-star.

== Plot ==
Raj works in Toronto on a temporary visa and is living with his friend Prem, who resents Raj for invading what little living space he has. When Raj's application for permanent residency in Canada is denied, he decides to marry a complete stranger in hopes of getting approved. The woman, Pia, finds that she has to move in with Raj to make everything look legitimate, but as time passes the two find themselves becoming friends. However all of Raj's plans are potentially ruined when he meets Linda, a woman who makes him doubt his previous actions.

== Cast ==
- Manoj Amarnani for Raj
- Nancy Brunetta for Linda
- Anokhi Dalvi for Pia
- Parth Naik for Prem
- Master Aaryan for Rahul
- Jayiesh Singh for Rohit
- Sunaina Verma for Meghina
- Arjun Jasuja for Keswani
- Shaibal Datta for Jai
- Munish Kumar Joshi
- Kuldip Kumar Joshi

== Singers ==
All music is composed by John T. Hunt.

No.	Title	Singer(s)	Length
1.	"Kya Sunaoon"	Sonu Nigam, Shreya Ghoshal
2.	"Manzilein Raaste Sab Tere Vaaste"	Udit Narayan, Alka Yagnik
3.	"Sajna Ve"	Rahat Fateh Ali Khan
4.	"Bezubaan"	Nikhil D'Souza
5.	"Soniye Heriye"	Richa Tirupati, Farhad
6.	"Kya Bataoon" (Reprise)	Shreya Ghoshal, Sonu Nigam
7.	"Mann Bawra"	Naushad Ali

== Reception ==
The Times of India rated the film at 2 stars, writing "Actor Manoj Amarnani juggles the multiple roles of director, background score composer, choreographer and stylist for the film. He dabbles in almost everything and in spite of being a newcomer, manages to make a film that is watchable if not memorable."
