= Kuku Mathur Ki Jhand Ho Gayi =

- Directed by: Aman Sachdeva
- Written by: Vijay Kapoor; Aman Sachdeva
- Produced by: Ekta Kapoor; Shobha Kapoor; Bejoy Nambiar
- Starring: Siddharth Gupta; Simran Kaur Mundi; Ashish Juneja
- Cinematography: Uday Singh Mohite
- Music by: Songs: Mikey McCleary; Palash Sen; Anand Bajpai; Score: Amar Mohile
- Production company: Getaway Films
- Distributed by: Balaji Motion Pictures
- Release date: 30 May 2014
- Running time: 111 minutes
- Country: India
- Language: Hindi

Kuku Mathur Ki Jhand Ho Gayi (transl. Kuku Mathur was screwed) is a 2014 Indian Hindi-language romantic comedy-drama film directed by Aman Sachdeva and produced by Ekta Kapoor and Bejoy Nambiar. The film stars Siddharth Gupta, who plays the title role.

== Cast ==
- Siddharth Gupta as Kuku Mathur
- Ashish Juneja as Ronnie
- Simran Kaur Mundi as Mitali
- Amit Sial as Prabhakar Sala
- Brijendra Kala as Babaji
- Sidharth Bhardwaj as Himanshu
- Alok Chaturvedi as Suresh
- Roopa Ganguly as Suresh's wife
- Pallavi Batra as Rosy
- Mohit Sinha as Student (Babaji)
- Kumar Anuj Sharma as Yogesh
- Tanvi Kishore as Sunaina
- Rajshree Seem as Ronnie's Mother
- Neha Ahuja as Chhota

== Production ==
After much discussion Ekta Kapoor finalized that the film's title would be as quirky as the concept of the film and it was titled Kuku Mathur Ki Jhand Ho Gayi.The film's quirky title has been chosen through a survey by the youth of Delhi. While deciding on its title, the makers took inputs from Delhi students from various colleges. "We zeroed in on the word "jhand", which is very popular in the city. The word describes the hilarious crisis situation that the actor is in," Bejoy Nambiar said in a statement.

== Controversy ==
A resident of Bhopal, NL Mathur has filed a Public Interest Litigation (PIL) against Balaji Motion Pictures, claiming that the film's title has hurt sentiments of the Kayastha community. In his petition, Mathur claims that the word "Jhand" is derogatory and it will hurt the sentiments of Mathurs from the Kayastha community. Further the complainant has also asked the filmmakers to change name of the film or remove the offensive word from the title. However, Tanuj Garg, CEO of Balaji Motion Pictures, states that they have received no such PIL, further adding that the film's title relates to normal and standard nomenclature used in the country.
