= Nikhil D'Souza =

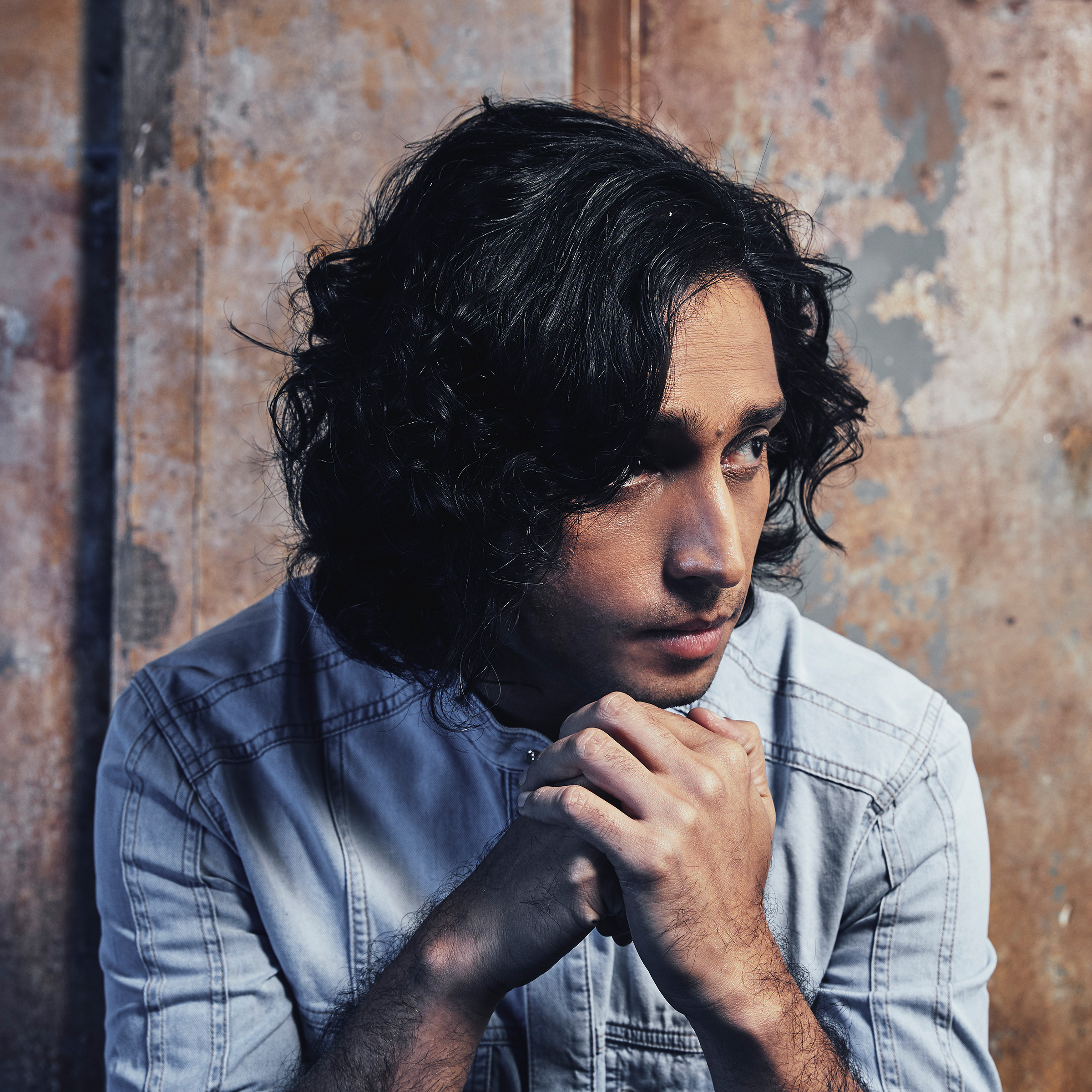

Background information
- Born: 21 November 1981 (age 44)
- Origin: Mumbai, India
- Genres: Filmi; Indie pop; Alternative rock
- Occupations: Singer, songwriter
- Instruments: Vocals, acoustic guitar
- Labels: East West Records; T-Series

Nikhil D'Souza (born 21 November 1981) is a singer, songwriter and guitarist from Mumbai, India, and is signed to East West Records of Warner Music UK.

== Early life ==
Nikhil D'Souza was born and brought up in Mumbai and majored in Geology from St. Xavier's College, Mumbai but returned to his musical roots after an encounter with a friend.

== Career ==
Nikhil's major musical influences are Sting and Jeff Buckley. He was the South Asia Soloist Winner at SUTASI '09.

Nikhil has released four songs with East West Records, a label owned by Warner Music UK. These include Silver and Gold and Beautiful Mind.

Neha Sharma from Rolling Stone India said his "strength as a songwriter is well established in his numerous gripping compositions. Most of his songs shiver with this arresting melancholy as his falsetto glides over twangy guitar riffs”. India Today also included Nikhil as part of their "Faces of the Future," and he has featured on MTV's COKE Studio series and Sofar Sounds.

== Discography ==
Denotes films that have not yet been released

Year	Song	Film	Composer(s)	Co-singer(s)
2010	Shaam	Aisha	Amit Trivedi	Amit Trivedi, Neuman Pinto
2010	Mere Bina	Crook	Pritam	–
2010	Anjaana Anjaani Ki Kahani	Anjaana Anjaani	Vishal–Shekhar	Monali Thakur
2010	Main Jiyunga	Break Ke Baad	Vishal–Shekhar	
2011	I'm The One	Ishaan		
2011	Khwaab Ye Kal Ke	Ishaan		Rajiv Sundaresan
2011	Khwab (Rock)	Kucch Luv Jaisaa	Pritam	–
2011	Khwab (Raghav's Confession)	Kucch Luv Jaisaa	Pritam	–
2011	Hello Hello Laila	Dhada	Devi Sri Prasad	Neha Bhasin
2011	You're So Beautiful	Haunted	Chirantan Bhatt	
2011	Lamha Lamha	Ye Stupid Pyar	Vipin Patwa	
2012	Gubbare Gubbare	Ek Main Aur Ekk Tu	Amit Trivedi	
2012	Dil Ye Bekarar Kyun Hai – Reprise	Players	Pritam	Priyani Vani
2012	"Dil Ye Bekarar Kyun Hai - Remix"	Players	Pritam	Mohit Chauhan, Shreya Ghoshal
2012	Jannatein Kahan (Power Ballad)	Jannat 2	Pritam	
2012	Sang Hoon Tere	Jannat 2	Pritam	
2012	Tera Naam Japdi Phiran	Cocktail	Pritam	Javed Bashir, Shefali Alvares
2012	Tera Naam Japdi Phiran - Remix	Cocktail	Pritam	Javed Bashir, Shefali Alvares
2012	Anu Vidhaiththa Boomiyile (Tamil)	Vishwaroop	Shankar–Ehsaan–Loy	Kamal Haasan
2012	Koi Kahin (Hindi)	Vishwaroop	Shankar–Ehsaan–Loy	Kamal Haasan
2012	Dooriyan	Cigarette Ki Tarah	–	–
2013	Out of Control	David	Mikey McCleary	Preeti Pillai
2013	Bas Main Aur Tu	Akaash Vani	Hitesh Sonik	Vasudha Sharma
2013	"Bas Main Aur Tu (Reprise)"	Akaash Vani	Hitesh Sonik	Vasudha Sharma
2013	Jaata Hai Tujh Tak	Murder 3	Anupam Amod	–
2013	Jaata Hai Tujh Tak (Film Version)	Murder 3	Anupam Amod	–
2013	"Close to You" (Extended Play)	Yeh Jawaani Hai Deewani	Pritam	-
2013	"Suno Na" (Extended Play)	Yeh Jawaani Hai Deewani	Pritam	-
2013	Thu Hi Rey	Gunde Jaari Gallanthayyinde	Anoop Rubens	Nithya Menen
2013	Alvida	D-Day	Shankar–Ehsaan–Loy	Sukhvinder Singh, Shruti Hassan, Loy Mendonsa
2013	Har Kisi Ko	Boss	Chirantan Bhatt	
2013	Ninne Ninne Chusthunte	Adda		
2014	O Gujariya	Queen	Amit Trivedi	Shefali Alvares
2014	Bebaak	Filmistaan	Arijit Datta	–
2014	Waakeyi	Amit Sahni Ki List	Raghu Dixit	Shruti Pathak
2014	Bezubaan	Life is beautiful!	John Hunt	–
2014	Love Me Thoda Aur	Yaariyan	Pritam	Arijit Singh, Monali Thakur
2015	Lip to Lip	Katti Batti	Shankar–Ehsaan–Loy	Ritu Pathak
2015	Tu Mila	Timepass 2	Vishal–Shekhar	Shamali Kholgade
2016	You and Me	Befikre	Vishal–Shekhar	Rachael Vergese
2016	"Dil Yeh Khamakha (Revisited)"	Saansein	Vivek Kar	
2017	Parinda (Search)	Jab Harry Met Sejal	Pritam	Tochi Raina
2017	Aate Jaate Hanste Gaate	Golmaal Again	Abhishek Arora	Anushka Manchanda
2018	Phir Se Title Track	Phir Se...	Jeet Gannguli	Shreya Ghoshal
2018	Phir Se Title Track (Sad Version)	Phir Se...	Jeet Gannguli	Shreya Ghoshal
2018	Phir Se Title Track (Remix)	Phir Se...	Jeet Gannguli	Shreya Ghoshal
2019	Vaaste Single		Tanishk Bagchi	Dhvani Bhanushali
2019	Dil Hi Toh Hai	The Sky Is Pink	Pritam	Arijit Singh, Antara Mitra
2019	Dil Hi Toh Hai (Reprise)	The Sky Is Pink	Pritam	Sreerama Chandra, Antara Mitra
2020	People	Single:EP	-	
2020	Waqt	EP	-	
2020	Aadatein		Gaurav Dagaonkar	
2021	Tu Hi Hai Meri Zindagi		Jubair Muhammed	
2021	Mauja			
2022	"Saathiya"	Cuttputlli	Tanishk Bagchi	Zahrah S Khan
2023	"Kya Hume Socha Tha"	Starfish	OAFF	OAFF, Tulsi Kumar
