= Kuch Khattaa Ho Jaay =

2024 Indian Hindi film

- Theatrical release poster
- Directed by: G. Ashok
- Written by: Raj Saluja; Niket Pandey; Vijay Pal Singh
- Screenplay by: Raajj Salluja; Niket Pandey; Vijaypal Singh; Shobhit Sinha
- Produced by: Amit Bhatia; Laveena Bhatia
- Starring: Guru Randhawa; Saiee Manjrekar
- Cinematography: R M Swamy
- Edited by: Dhiraj Kumar Wadhwa
- Music by: Guru Randhawa; Sachet-Parampara; Meet Bros; Sadhu Tiwari; Nilesh Ahuja
- Production company: Mach Films
- Distributed by: AA Films
- Release date: 16 February 2024
- Running time: 125 minutes
- Country: India
- Language: Hindi

Kuch Khattaa Ho Jaay (transl. Let's get something sour) is a 2024 Indian Hindi-language romantic comedy directed by G. Ashok. Produced under Mach Films, the film is written by Raj Saluj, Niket Pandey and Vijay Pal Singh and stars Guru Randhawa and Saiee Manjrekar.

== Plot ==
Heer and Iraa, deeply in love, decide to marry to escape pressure from their families. Heer promises to support Iraa's ambition to become an IAS officer. However, their plans are disrupted when both families mistakenly believe that Heer is pregnant. The misunderstanding triggers chaos, resulting in a series of comedic and dramatic situations. As they deal with their families' reactions, Heer and Iraa must clear up the misunderstanding while pursuing their dreams and maintaining their relationship amid the turmoil.

== Cast ==
- Guru Randhawa as Heer
- Saiee Manjrekar as Iraa
- Brahmanandam as Lucky Bhalla
- Anupam Kher as Heer's grandfather
- Ila Arun
- Atul Srivastava
- Paresh Ganatra
- Paritosh Tripathi

== Soundtrack ==
The music of the film is composed by Guru Randhawa, Meet Bros, Star Boy LOC, Zahrah S Khan, Sachet–Parampara, Sadhu S. Tiwari, Niket Pandey and Nilesh Ahuja, while the lyrics are written by Kumaar, Sadhu S. Tiwari, Niket Pandey and Ravi Kumar Mishra.

| No. | Title | Singer(s) | Composer(s) | Lyricist(s) |
|---|---|---|---|---|
| 1 | Bottley Kholo | Guru Randhawa, Meet Bros, Star Boy LOC | Guru Randhawa, Meet Bros, Star Boy LOC | Kumaar |
| 2 | Ishare Tere | Guru Randhawa, Zahrah S Khan | Guru Randhawa, Zahrah S Khan | Kumaar |
| 3 | Jeena Sikhaya | Sachet–Parampara, Guru Randhawa, Parampara Tandon | Sachet–Parampara | Kumaar |
| 4 | Raja Rani | Guru Randhawa | Guru Randhawa | Kumaar |
| 5 | Jhol Jhal | Sadhu S. Tiwari, Niket Pandey | Sadhu S. Tiwari, Niket Pandey | Sadhu S. Tiwari, Niket Pandey |
| 6 | Happy Birthday | Sadhu S. Tiwari, Niket Pandey | Sadhu S. Tiwari, Niket Pandey | Sadhu S. Tiwari, Niket Pandey |
| 7 | Iss Baar Jo Chale Gaye | Nilesh Ahuja, Ravi Kumar Mishra | Nilesh Ahuja | Kumaar, Ravi Kumar Mishra |

== Release ==
The film was released on 16 February 2024.
