= Dhvani Bhanushali =

Indian pop singer and actress (born 1998)

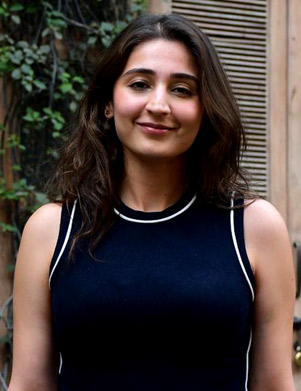
- Bhanushali in 2024

Background information
- Born: 22 March 1998 (age 28); Mumbai, Maharashtra, India
- Genres: Bollywood; I-pop
- Occupation: Singer
- Years active: 2018–present
- Labels: T-Series, Hitz Music

Dhvani Bhanushali (born 22 March 1998) is an Indian singer and actress. Born in Mumbai, she gained recognition with her single "Vaaste" (2019), which has received over 1.7 billion views on YouTube.

She began her music career in 2017 with an acoustic version of the song Humsafar from Badrinath Ki Dulhania. Her first film song was Ishtehaar from Welcome To New York (2018). In the same year, she appeared in the music video "Ishare Tere" alongside Guru Randhawa and performed "Dilbar" from Satyameva Jayate.

== Early life and career ==
Bhanushali was born in a Gujarati Hindu family in Mumbai to father Vinod Bhanushali and mother Rinku Bhanushali. Her father was the President of Global Marketing and Media Publishing for T-Series for 27 years until he quit the company in August 2021 to start his own venture Bhanushali Studios Limited. She has a younger sister named Diya Bhanushali.

Bhanushali, who made her debut with the songs "Humsafar Acoustic" from Badrinath Ki Dulhania, "Tere Mere Reprise" from Chef, "Veere" from Veere Di Wedding, and "Ishtehaar" from the film Welcome To New York, later worked with Neha Kakkar on the song "Dilbar" and Guru Randhawa on the song "Ishare Tere". Her debut song was "Ishtehaar" from the film Welcome To New York, in which she sang with Rahat Fateh Ali Khan. Her song, "Dilbar", was the first Hindi language song to enter the Billboard Top Ten. She has released a carpool mashup of "Gulabi Aankhen" and "Shape of You". She has released the singles "Leja Re" and "Main Teri Hoon". She has sung "Duniya" from the movie Luka Chuppi along with Akhil. She has also sung the song "Laila" for the film Notebook. Her super hit single "Vaaste" along with Nikhil D'Souza, starring herself and Siddharth Gupta, gained 2 billion views and counting in June 2020 making her the fastest and youngest star to reach this mark. Next in cue was "Dariyaganj" along with Arijit Singh from the film Jai Mummy Di. She then sang "Nachi Nachi" from the movie Street Dancer 3D along with Neeti Mohan and Millind Gaba. She also sang "Jeetenge Hum" which was composed by DJ Chetas and Lijo George and penned by Manoj Muntashir and "Gallan Goriyan" composed by Taz and written by Kumaar during the Coronavirus lockdown in India. Later on, she sang "Baby Girl" along with Guru Randhawa which is composed and written by him too. The last song sung by her in 2020 is "Nayan" with Jubin Nautiyal which is composed by DJ Chetas and Lijo George and written by Manoj Muntashir. She released her new single "Radha" on her 23rd birthday. She also released a Gujarati song on the occasion of Navaratri 2021 Mehendi with 65 million views on her channel. Her Mera Yaar was released on 1 December 2021 with more than 50 million views. Her latest song, 'Candy' with Yuvan Shankar Raja released on Hitz Music's official YouTube channel.

On working with Tanishk Bagchi, she commented that he is her mentor. She said, "He has guided me really well. My career is mostly made because of him."

She graduated from the University of Mumbai with Bachelor of Commerce in September 2019. She also has done a BME (Business Management & Entrepreneurship) from the Indian School of Management & Entrepreneurship, Mumbai.

== Discography ==
Denotes films that have not yet been released

=== Film songs ===
Year	Title	Film	Co-singer(s)	Composer(s)	Lyricist(s)	Label	Notes	Language
2018	"Ishtehaar"	Welcome to New York	Rahat Fateh Ali Khan	Shamir Tandon	Charanjeet Charan	Pooja Music/Sony Music India		Hindi
2018	"Smiley"	Welcome to New York	Boman Irani	Shamir Tandon	Kumaar, Varun Likhate	Pooja Music/Sony Music India		Hindi
2018	"Veere"	Veere Di Wedding	Vishal Mishra, Aditi Singh Sharma, Payal Dev, Nikita Ahuja, Iulia Vântur, Sharvi Yadav	Vishal Mishra	Anvita Dutt	Zee Music Company		Hindi
2018	"Dilbar"	Satyameva Jayate	Neha Kakkar, Ikka Singh	Tanishk Bagchi	Shabbir Ahmed, Ikka	T-Series		Hindi
2019	"Duniyaa"	Luka Chuppi	Akhil	Abhijit Vaghani	Kunaal Vermaa	T-Series		Hindi
2019	"Laila"	Notebook	Solo	Vishal Mishra	Abhendra Upadhyay & Vishal Mishra	T-Series		Hindi
2019	"Mukhda Vekh Ke"	De De Pyaar De	Mika Singh	Manj Musik	Kumaar	T-Series		Hindi
2019	"Rula Diya"	Batla House	Ankit Tiwari		Prince Dubey	T-Series		Hindi
2019	"Gallan Goriyan"	Batla House	Taz		Kumaar, Taz	T-Series	Released in 2020	Hindi
2019	"Bekhayali Acoustic"	Kabir Singh	Solo	Sachet–Parampara	Irshad Kamil	T-Series		Hindi
2019	"Koka"	Khandaani Shafakhana	Jasbir Jassi, Badshah	Tanishk Bagchi	Tanishk Bagchi & Mellow D	T-Series		Hindi
2019	"Psycho Saiyaan"	Saaho	Sachet Tandon, Tanishk Bagchi	Tanishk Bagchi	Tanishk Bagchi	T-Series		Hindi
2019	"Psycho Saiyaan" (Telugu)	Saaho	Anirudh Ravichandar, Tanishk Bagchi	Tanishk Bagchi	Sreejo	T-Series	Telugu Debut	Telugu
2019	"Kadhal Psycho"	Saaho	Anirudh Ravichandar, Tanishk Bagchi	Tanishk Bagchi	Madhan Karky	T-Series	Tamil Debut	Tamil
2019	"Psycho Saiyaan" (Malayalam)	Saaho	Yazin Nizar, Tanishk Bagchi	Tanishk Bagchi	Vinayak Sasikumar	T-Series	Malayalam Debut	Malayalam
2019	"Aagaz"	Cypher	Jubin Nautiyal	Bharat Kamal	Sagar Pathak	T-Series		Hindi
2019	"Dhooram"	Adithya Varma	Solo	Radhan	Vivega	Aditya Music		Tamil
2019	"Tum Hi Aana" (Duet Version)	Marjaavaan	Jubin Nautiyal	Payal Dev	Kunaal Vermaa	T-Series		Hindi
2019	"Kinna Sona"	Marjaavaan	Jubin Nautiyal	Meet Bros	Kumaar	T-Series		Hindi
2019	"Sauda Khara Khara"	Good Newwz	Diljit Dosanjh, Sukhbir	DJ Chetas – Lijo George, Sukhbir	Kumaar	Zee Music Company		Hindi
2020	"Dariyaganj"	Jai Mummy Di	Arijit Singh	Amartya Bobo Rahut	Siddhant Kaushal	T-Series		Hindi
2020	"Dariyaganj" (Female Version)	Jai Mummy Di	Solo	Amartya Bobo Rahut	Siddhant Kaushal	T-Series		Hindi
2020	"Nachi Nachi"	Street Dancer 3D	Neeti Mohan, Millind Gaba	Sachin–Jigar	Millind Gaba, Asli Gold	T-Series		Hindi
2020	"Racha Racha"	Street Dancer 3D	Neeti Mohan, Millind Gaba	Sachin–Jigar	Ramajogayya Shastry	T-Series		Telugu
2020	"Aadu Aadu"	Street Dancer 3D	Neeti Mohan, Millind Gaba	Sachin–Jigar	Veeramani Kannan, Tony J – Madras Macha	T-Series		Tamil
2020	"Tujhe Samajh Aavega"	Angrezi Medium	Solo	Sachin–Jigar		T-Series	In movie only	Hindi
2022	"Parda Daari"	Janhit Mein Jaari	Javed Ali	Prini Siddhant Madhav	Sameer Anjaan	Hitz Music		Hindi
2022	"Uda Gulaal Ishq Wala"	Janhit Mein Jaari	Amit Gupta	Amol-Abhishek	Abhishek Talented	Hitz Music		Hindi
2022	"Current Laga Re"	Cirkus	Nakash Aziz, Jonita Gandhi, Vivek Hariharan, Lijo George	Lijo George-DJ Chetas	Kumaar	T-Series		Hindi
2024	"Sehra"	Kahan Shuru Kahan Khatam	Varun Jain	Sachin-Jigar	Kausar Munir	Saregama		Hindi
2024	"Sehra" (Dhvani Bhanushali Version)	Kahan Shuru Kahan Khatam	Solo	Sachin-Jigar	Kausar Munir	Saregama		Hindi
2024	"Ishq De Shot"	Kahan Shuru Kahan Khatam	IP Singh	Akshay-IP	IP Singh	Saregama		Hindi
2024	"Kahan Shuru Kahan Khatam" (Title Track)	Kahan Shuru Kahan Khatam	Lata Mangeshkar, Vismay Patel	Akshay-IP	Shailendra, IP Singh	Saregama	Original music by: Shankar-Jaikishan	Hindi
2025	"Ban Piya"	Suswagatam Khushaamadeed	Armaan Mallik	Amol–Abhishek	Abhishek Talented	Zee Music Company		Hindi
2026	"Yaad Tu Aaya" (Reprise)	Parivarik ManuRanjan		Anuj Garg	Yash Kapoor, Anuj Garg	Zee Music Company	Original singer : Jubin Nautiyal	Hindi

=== Originals/Music Videos ===
Year	Title	Co-singer(s)	Composer(s)	Lyricist(s)	Label	Notes
2018	"Ishare Tere"	Guru Randhawa			T-Series	
2018	"Leja Re"		Tanishk Bagchi	Rashmi Virag	T-Series	Remake of "Leja Leja Re"
2019	"Main Teri Hoon"		Sachin–Jigar	Priya Saraiya	T-Series	
2019	"Vaaste"	Nikhil D'Souza	Tanishk Bagchi	Arafat Mehmood	T-Series	Crossed 1 billion views on YouTube.
2020	"Na Ja Tu"	Shashwat Singh	Tanishk Bagchi	Tanishk Bagchi	T-Series	
2020	"Jeetenge Hum"		Lijo George-DJ Chetas	Manoj Muntashir	T-Series	
2020	"Gallan Goriyan"	Taz	Taz	Kumaar, Taz	T-Series	
2020	"Baby Girl"	Guru Randhawa			T-Series	
2020	"Om Jai Jagadish Hare"	Neha Kakkar,Tulsi Kumar, Jubin Nautiyal,Guru Randhawa, Millind Gaba, Sachet Tondon, Parampara Thakur	Manan Bhardwaj		T-Series	
2020	"Nayan"	Jubin Nautiyal	Lijo George-DJ Chetas	Manoj Muntashir	T-Series	
2021	"Radha"		Abhijit Vaghani	Kunaal Vermaa	T-Series	
2021	"Tumse Milna/Is Kadar"	Guru Randhawa	Abhijit Vaghani/Himesh Reshammiya/Sajid-Wajid	Faaiz Anwar/Sameer	T-Series	
2021	"Mehendi"	Vishal Dadlani	Lijo George-DJ Chetas	Priya Saraiya	Hitz Music	
2021	"Mera Yaar"	Ash King	Herself	Herself, Shloke Lal	Hitz Music	
2022	"Candy"		Yuvan Shankar Raja	Arivu	U1 Records & Hitz Music	Tamil
2022	"Candy"		Yuvan Shankar Raja	"Kunaal Vermaa"	U1 Records & Hitz Music	Hindi
2022	"Dynamite"		Gourav Dasgupta	Kunwar Juneja	Hitz Music	Punjabi
2022	"Aadi Aadi"	Mellow D	Mellow D	Mellow D	Hitz Music	Hindi
2022	"Hona Mere"		Abhijit Vaghani & Herself	Rashmi Virag	Hitz Music	Hindi
2022	"Ek Tarfa"		Gaurav Chatterji	Sandeep Gaur	Hitz Music	Hindi
2022	"Badhaiyaan"		Vivaswan, Happy Singh	J2	Hitz Music	Hindi
2022	"Oda Vyah"	Jashan Singh	Jashan Singh	Ardaas	Hitz Music	Hindi
2022	"Kudi Meri"	Yash Narvekar	Lijo George-DJ Chetas	Kumaar	Hitz Music	Hindi
2023	"Preet" (from album Lagan)	Abhijit Vaghani	Abhijit Vaghani	Shloke Lal	Hitz Music	Hindi
2023	"Jaadu"(from album Lagan"	Ash King	Abhijit Vaghani	Shloke Lal	Hitz Music	
2023	"Khushnaseebi" (from album Lagan)		Abhijit Vaghani	Shloke Lal	Hitz Music	
2023	"Masoomiyat"(from album Lagan)		Abhijit Vaghani	Shloke Lal	Hitz Music	
2023	"Shagun"(from album Lagan)	Abhijit Vaghani,Mausam & Malka Mehta	Abhijit Vaghani	Shloke Lal,Dilip Rawal	Hitz Music	Hindi, Gujarati
2023	"Naina Milaike"		Sunny M. R.	Shloke Lal, Harjot Kaur, Sunny M.R.	Hitz Music	Hindi
2023	"Garbo"		Tanishk Bagchi	Narendra Modi	Jjust Music	Gujarati
2024	"Hold On"		Sunny M.R.	Youngveer	Hitz Music	Hindi
2024	"Thank You God"	Devid Arkwright	Dhvani Bhanushali,Devid Arkwright,Natania Lalwani,Miranda Glory Inzunza	Shloke Lal,Dhvani Bhanushali,Devid Arkwright,Natania Lalwani,Miranda Glory Inzunza	Hitz Music	Hindi, English
2025	"Aankhon"		Oaff & Savera	Ankur Tewari	Dhvani Bhanushali	
2025	"Bairagi"		Keshav Tyohar, Harjot Kaur, Youngveer, Shrey Gupta	Youngveer	Warner Music India	
2025	"Pehla Ishq"		Sachin Gupta	Kumaar	DB	

== Filmography ==
=== Films ===
Year	Title	Role	Note
2024	Kahan Shuru Kahan Khatam	Meera	Film debut
