= Slowly Slowly (Guru Randhawa song) =

2019 single by Guru Randhawa featuring Pitbull

Single by Guru Randhawa featuring Pitbull
- Language: Punjabi; Hindi; English; Spanish
- Released: 19 April 2019
- Genre: EDM; reggaeton; Indian pop; rap
- Length: 3:25
- Label: T-Series
- Composers: Guru Randhawa; DJ Shadow; BlackOut; DJ Money Willz; Vee Music; MKSHFT
- Lyricists: Guru Randhawa; Pitbull
- Producer: Vee Music, Dj Shadow, DJ Money Willz, MKSHFT

Guru Randhawa singles chronology
| "Daaru Wargi" (2019) | "Slowly Slowly" (2019) | "Ishq Tera" (2019) |

Pitbull singles chronology
| "Yayo" (2019) | "Slowly Slowly" (2019) | "No Lo Trates" (2019) |

Music videos
- "Slowly Slowly" on YouTube

"Slowly Slowly" is a song by Indian singer-songwriter Guru Randhawa featuring American rapper Pitbull, released on 19 April 2019 via T-Series.

== Background ==
The song is a collaboration between Guru Randhawa and Pitbull, and is released under the T-Series label. It is Guru Randhawa's first international collaboration. The lyrics, written by Guru Randhawa and Pitbull themselves, are in Punjabi, English, and Spanish. It has been described as the "party anthem of the year" by T-Series. It became popular not only due to the presence of international audience but also the fact that it was released during the time T-Series was gaining subscribers at a faster rate and going to become the most subscribed channel on YouTube.

== Credits and personnel ==
- Guru Randhawa – vocals, songwriting
- Pitbull – vocals, songwriting
- DJ Shadow – music
- DJ BlackOut – music, mixing
- DJ Money Willz – music
- Vee Music – music
- MKSHFT – music
- Al Burna – mixing
- David Fuller – mastering

== Reception ==
The song marked Guru Randhawa and label T-Series' international debut. It was well received by audiences. The song's music video was watched about 38 million times on YouTube India in its first 24 hours and the only one on the list not accompanied by an album release. The video was watched 100 million times on YouTube in less than 14 days.

As of October 2025, it has over 250 million views on YouTube.
