= Sashi Kiran Tikka =

Indian film director and screenwriter

- Education: New York Film Academy
- Occupations: Film director, screenwriter
- Years active: 2018–present

Sashi Kiran Tikka is an Indian film director and screenwriter who works primarily in Telugu cinema. He is known for directing Goodachari (2018) and Major (2022).

Tikka studied filmmaking and direction at the New York Film Academy. He later worked as an assistant director to Sekhar Kammula on the political drama Leader (2010).

Tikka made his directorial debut with Goodachari (2018), a spy thriller that received critical attention and was discussed in national media for its narrative style. He later directed Major (2022), a biographical action film based on the life of Sandeep Unnikrishnan, who was killed during the 2008 Mumbai attacks. The film received extensive national media attention. He served as presenter and screenplay writer for Satyabhama (2024).

== Filmography ==
Year	Film	Role
2018	Goodachari	Director
2022	Major	Director
2024	Satyabhama	Presenter; Screenplay
