= Mannu Kya Karegga =

Indian Hindi-language romantic drama film

- Theatrical release poster
- Directed by: Ssanjay Tripaathy
- Written by: Saurabh Gupta
- Produced by: Sharad Mehra
- Starring: Vyom Yadav; Saachi Bindra; Vinay Pathak; Kumud Mishra; Rajesh Kumar
- Cinematography: Raghav Ramadoss
- Edited by: Varun Kulkarni; Aarif Sheikh
- Music by: Lalit Pandit
- Production company: Curious Eyes Cinema
- Release date: 12 September 2025
- Running time: 141 minutes
- Country: India
- Language: Hindi

Mannu Kya Karegga (transl. What will Mannu do?) is a 2025 Indian Hindi-language romantic drama film directed by Ssanjay Tripaathy and produced by Sharad Mehra with Jannat Sethi as executive producer under the banner Curious Eyes Cinema. The film stars Vyom Yadav and Saachi Bindra in their feature film debuts. The music is composed by Lalit Pandit and features playback by Shaan, Udit Narayan, Mohit Chauhan, Stebin Ben and Akriti Kakar. The film will be released theatrically on 12 September 2025.

== Plot ==
Set on a college campus in Dehradun, the story follows Mannu, a spirited and mischievous young man who excels in music, sports, and technology but lacks clarity about his future. His journey is shaped by friendships, his search for love, heartbreak, and the process of finding himself. Through the ups and downs of youth, Mannu learns about hope, resilience, and the deeper meaning of love, with moments and sequences woven together through music and emotional beats.

== Cast ==
- Vyom Yadav as Mannu
- Saachi Bindra as Jiya
- Vinay Pathak as D.O.N
- Kumud Mishra as father
- Rajesh Kumar as Suryaprakash Sarod
- Charu Shankar as Rashmi
- Brijendra Kala
- Aayat Memon as Savi
- Namann Gor as Chand
- Dimple Sharma
- Lavina Tandon as Arti Didi

== Soundtrack ==
The film score and songs are composed by Lalit Pandit.

No.	Title	Lyrics	Singer(s)	Length
1.	"Halki Halki Barish"	Javed Akhtar	Shaan, Akriti Kakar
2.	"Mannu Tera Kya Hoga"	Kumaar	Shaan, Manasi Ghosh, Akanksha Sinha, Mellow D
3.	"Humnava"		Varun Jain
4.	"Fanaa Hua"	Sharad Mehra	Mohit Chauhan
5.	"Gulfam"		Stebin Ben
6.	"Teri Yaadein"	Sharad Mehra	Raghav Chaitanya
7.	"Na Kar Sasse"		Sulakhni Kaur
8.	"Chhaya Hai Andhiyara"		Malini Awasthi, Udit Narayan

== Release ==
The film was released theatrically on 12 September 2025.
