= Ghani (2022 film) =

Film by Kiran Korrapati

- Theatrical release poster
- Directed by: Kiran Korrapati
- Written by: Kiran Korrapati
- Produced by: Sidhu Mudda; Allu Bobby
- Starring: Varun Tej; Upendra; Suniel Shetty; Jagapathi Babu; Saiee Manjrekar; Naveen Chandra
- Cinematography: George C. Williams
- Edited by: Marthand K. Venkatesh
- Music by: S. Thaman
- Production companies: Renaissance Pictures; Allu Bobby Company
- Distributed by: Geetha Arts
- Release date: 8 April 2022
- Running time: 152 minutes
- Country: India
- Language: Telugu
- Budget: ₹30–50 crore
- Box office: est. ₹21.3 crore

Ghani is a 2022 Indian Telugu-language sports drama film written and directed by Kiran Korrapati and produced by Renaissance Pictures and Allu Bobby Company. The film stars Varun Tej as the title character alongside an ensemble cast of Upendra, Suniel Shetty, Jagapathi Babu, Saiee Manjrekar, and Naveen Chandra, along with a special appearance by Tamannaah.

The film was scheduled to release on 25 February 2022 theatrically but postponed further. The film was released on 8 April 2022, and received overwhelmingly negative reviews from critics. Following the film's release, Tej acknowledged and apologised, accepting the film's failure at the box office through a note on social media.

== Cast ==
- Varun Tej as Ghani
  - Ronit Kamra as young Ghani
- Upendra as Vikramaditya, Ghani's father
- Suniel Shetty as Vijender Sinha
- Jagapathi Babu as Eswarnath
- Nadhiya as Madhuri, Ghani's mother
- Saiee Manjrekar as Maya
- Naveen Chandra as Aadi
- Naresh as Ghani’s college coach
- Tanikella Bharani as Maya’s father
- Satya as Vijender's servant
- Raghu Babu as Eswarnath's assistant
- Bharath Reddy as Yusuf, Betting specialist
- Brahmaji as Sports federation member
- Hari Teja as Madhuri's maid
- Appaji Ambarisha Darbha as Boxing committee head
- Sukhjeevan Singh Dhillon as Ivan
- Ashu Reddy as Maya's friend
- Sudharshan as Ghani's friend
- Rajiv Kumar Aneja as a commentator
- Lahari Shari as a commentator

=== Cameo appearance ===
- Tamannaah Bhatia in a performance in the special song "Kodthe"

== Production ==
The film's title was unveiled in January 2021. Tej was reported to play a boxer. He was trained under Tony Jeffries, the former England boxer who won a bronze at the 2008 Summer Olympics. The film is produced by Sidhu Mudda and Allu Bobby. S. Thaman is composing the music.

Upendra joined the production in February 2021. Filming took place in Hyderabad. A shooting schedule also took place at Visakhapatnam. Special sets were made for the boxing episodes of the film.

== Music ==
Ghani

Soundtrack album by S. Thaman
- Released: 31 March 2022
- Recorded: 2021
- Genre: Feature film soundtrack
- Length: 11:43
- Language: Telugu
- Label: Aditya Music
- Producer: S. Thaman

S. Thaman chronology
Bheemla Nayak (2022)	Ghani (2022)	Sarkaru Vaari Paata (2022)

Singles from Ghani
- 1. "Ghani Anthem" Released: 27 October 2021; 2. "Kodthe" Released: 15 January 2022; 3. "Romeo Juliet" Released: 8 February 2022

The film score and soundtrack album of the film is composed by S. Thaman. The first single from the soundtrack, "Ghani Anthem" was released on 27 October 2021. The music rights were acquired by Aditya Music.

No.	Title	Lyrics	Singer(s)	Length
1.	"Ghani Anthem"	Ramajogayya Sastry	Aditya Iyengar, Sri Krishna, Sai Charan, Prudhvi Chandra	4:06
2.	"Kodthe"	Ramajogayya Sastry	Harika Narayan	3:46
3.	"Romeo Juliet"	Raghuram	Aditi Shankar	3:51
Total length:				11:43

== Release ==
Ghani was released on 8 April 2022. The film was originally scheduled to release on 30 July 2021, but was later postponed due to COVID-19 pandemic in India. In early-August 2021, the film's release was rescheduled to November 2021, coinciding with Deepavali. In October 2021, the release date was announced as 3 December 2021. Later, it was rescheduled to release on 24 December 2021. In the early-December, the makers postponed the release indefinitely to avoid clash with other films releasing the same month. In February 2022, it was announced by the makers that the film will release on 25 February 2022 or that the film was going to be postponed to 4 March 2022 depending upon the release of other films. The film was scheduled for a theatrical release on 25 February 2022 but was postponed due to Bheemla Nayak choosing to release on that day.

Non-theatrical rights including digital streaming and satellite rights of the film were acquired by Aha and Gemini TV respectively at a cost of ₹25 crore combined. Prior to the film's release, Telangana Today reported that the film premiere on Netflix, but the film was premiered on Aha on 22 April 2022.

== Reception ==
=== Box office ===
Ghani collected a distributor's share of ₹3 crore on its opening day. The film was able to collect close to ₹6 crore in the first two days.

=== Critical response ===
The film received mixed to negative reviews from critics who severely panned the film. Neeshita Nyayapati of The Times of India rated the film 2.5 out of 5 stars and wrote "Ghani is a decent sports drama, but that’s all it ends up being – decent. The film doesn’t provide anything you haven’t seen before". A reviewer from Sakshi Post rated the film 2.5 out of 5 stars and wrote "Ghani is a decent sports drama".

Sowmya Rajendran of The News Minute rated the film 2 out of 5 stars and stated "The film has nothing new to offer and is a half-baked sports drama full of déjà vu moments". Ram Venkat Srikar of The New Indian Express rated the film 1.5 out of 5 stars and wrote "Ghani fails to pack a punch. I know it’s a cliched verdict, but it’s still more inventive than the film". Sangeetha Devi Dundoo of The Hindu stated "A few masala moments stand out, but the sports and revenge drama is let down by insipid writing".
