= Skanda (film) =

2023 Indian film by Boyapati Sreenu

- Theatrical release poster
- Directed by: Boyapati Sreenu
- Written by: Boyapati Sreenu
- Dialogues by: M. Rathnam
- Produced by: Srinivasaa Chitturi; Pavan Kumar; Zee Studios
- Starring: Ram Pothineni; Sreeleela; Saiee Manjrekar; Srikanth
- Cinematography: Santosh Detake
- Edited by: Tammiraju
- Music by: S. Thaman
- Production companies: Srinivasaa Silver Screen; Zee Studios
- Release date: 28 September 2023
- Running time: 167 minutes
- Country: India
- Language: Telugu
- Budget: est. ₹50 crore

Skanda (transl. Hindu God of War/Son of Lord Shiva) is a 2023 Indian Telugu-language action drama film directed by Boyapati Srinu and produced by Srinivasaa Chitturi under Srinivasaa Silver Screen in collaboration with Zee Studios. The film features Ram Pothineni in a dual role, alongside Sreeleela, Saiee Manjrekar, Srikanth, Sharath Lohithaswa, Ajay Purkar, Babloo Prithiveeraj, Daggubati Raja and Prince Cecil in prominent roles.

The film was officially announced in February 2022, under the tentative title BoyapatiRAPO, while the official title Skanda was announced in July 2023. Principal photography began in October 2022, and wrapped in August 2023. The music is composed by Thaman S, while the cinematography and editing are handled by Santosh Detake and Tammiraju, respectively.

Skanda was released on September 28, 2023 to mixed-to-negative reviews and was criticized for its story, political satires, excessive violence, loudness and direction, but praised for the lead cast's performances, action stunts, and background score. The film was highly panned and it was a box-office bomb.

== Plot ==
Rayudu is the Chief Minister of Andhra Pradesh, who arranges his daughter's marriage with Chinnappa. During the marriage, the son of Chief Minister of Telangana Ranjith Reddy arrives at the marriage venue as a guest and elopes with Rayudu's daughter. This enrages Ranjith Reddy and Rayudu; they turn into enemies.

Meanwhile, Bhaskar Raju is a college student who kidnaps Rayudu's daughter and Ranjith Reddy's daughter, Leela (who also happens to be Bhaskar Raju's classmate) and takes them to his hometown in Rudrarajupuram. It is revealed that the kidnappings are connected to the CEO of the Crown Group company Rudrakanti Ramakrishna Raju, who is awaiting his death penalty and was imprisoned falsely by Ranjith Reddy and Rayudu for refusing to legitimize their illegal money. It is also revealed that Ramakrishna Raju is the best friend of Bhaskar Raju's father Manikanta Raju. The protagonist wants to prove Ramakrishna Raju's innocence, as he was forced to take the blame to protect his daughter Rudraganti Parineeta as she was held captive by Ranjith and Rayudu's men.

With no choice, Ranjith and Rayudu bail out Ramakrishna Raju from prison. Following this, the duo attacks Bhaskar Raju and his family at a temple festival, but they are saved by Skanda, Bhaskar Raju's doppelgänger. Eventually, Ranjith and Rayudu confess their crimes to the media. When Ramakrishna Raju inquires about Skanda, it is revealed that he is a notorious assassin from Morocco who is responsible for the death of Morocco-based powerful crime boss called Daniel. After learning about his history, Rayudu and Ranjith Reddy become frightened of him as Skanda walks away, indicating that his past will unfold in the sequel titled Skanda 2.

== Cast ==
- Ram Pothineni in a dual role as
  - Manikanta Bhaskar Raju
  - Skanda
- Sreeleela as Sreeleela Reddy, Ranjith Reddy's daughter and Bhaskar Raju's love interest
- Saiee Manjrekar as Rudrakanti Parineeta "Ammulu", Rudrakanti Ramakrishna Raju's daughter and Skanda's love interest
- Srikanth as Rudraganti Ramakrishna Raju
- Sharath Lohithaswa as Ranjith Reddy, Chief Minister of Telangana and Sreeleela's father
- Prince Cecil as Sanjay Reddy
- Ajay Purkar as Rayudu, Chief Minister of Andhra Pradesh
- Daggubati Raja as Manikanta Raju, Bhaskar's father and Rudraganti Ramakrishna Raju's best friend
- Prabhakar as Chinnappa
- Babloo Prithiveeraj as Pradeep Malhotra
- Sravan as Ranjith Reddy's PA
- Gauthami as Manikanta Lakshmi, Bhaskar's mother
- Indraja as Rudrakanti Bharathi, Ramakrishna Raju's wife
- Nithya Das as Female Protagonist's Mother
- Urvashi Rautela in a cameo appearance for the song "Cult Mama"
- Venkatesh Mummidi as Naveen's brother-in-law
- Daniel Kuttappa as Jacob
- Ravi Prakash as Employee in crown group of companies

== Production ==
=== Development ===
On 18 February 2022, Srinivasaa Silver Screen announced their next film, which is directed by Boyapati Srinu and would star Ram Pothineni in the lead role. It was tentatively titled as BoyapatiRAPO. A muhurtam puja was held on 1 June 2022 in Hyderabad. On 5 October 2022, Sreeleela was announced to play the lead female role, alongside Ram Pothineni for the first time. On 3 July 2023, a glimpse was released, which revealed the title Skanda. A.S. Prakash worked as the production designer of the film marking his fourth collaboration with Boyapati Srinu after Simha (film), Legend (2014 film) and Vinaya Vidheya Rama.

=== Filming ===
Principal photography commenced on 6 October 2022, with the first schedule in Ramoji Film City in Hyderabad. The second schedule commenced in November, and included an action sequence. The third schedule began in January 2023. The schedule included a scene featuring Pothineni and Sreeleela.

== Soundtrack ==
The soundtrack and background score is composed by Thaman S, in his fourth collaboration with Pothineni after Kandireega (2011), Masala (2013), and Pandaga Chesko (2015); third collaboration with Boyapati Srinu after Sarrainodu (2016) and Akhanda (2021). The first single, "Nee Chuttu Chuttu", was released on 6 July 2023.

Skanda

Soundtrack album by Thaman S
- Released: 6 July 2023
- Genre: Feature film soundtrack
- Length: 17:51
- Languages: Telugu; Hindi; Tamil; Malayalam
- Label: Junglee Music

Thaman S chronology
Bro (2023)	Skanda (2023)	Bhagavanth Kesari (2023)

Telugu
No.	Title	Lyrics	Music	Artist(s)	Length
1.	"Nee Chuttu Chuttu"	Raghuram	Thaman S	Sid Sriram, Sanjana Kalmanje	04:10
2.	"Gandarabai"	Anantha Sriram	Thaman S	Nakash Aziz, Soujanya Bhagavatula	03:51
3.	"Dummare Dumma"	Kalyanachakravarthy Tripuraneni	Thaman S	Armaan Malik, Ayyan Pranathi	04:11
4.	"Cult Mama"	Raghuram	Thaman S	Hemachandra, Ramya Behara, MaaHaa	04:07
5.	"Alaba Alabalaba"	Kasarla Syam	Thaman S	Mangli	1:32

Hindi
No.	Title	Lyrics	Music	Artist(s)	Length
1.	"Main Peeche Peeche"	Ritesh G Rao	Thaman S	Sreeram, Malavika	04:10
2.	"Gandarabai"	Ritesh G Rao	Thaman S	Hanuman, Ramya Behara	03:51
3.	"Dummare Dumma"	Ritesh G Rao	Thaman S	Chaitu Satsangi, Adviteeya	04:11
4.	"Cult Mama"	Ritesh G Rao	Thaman S	Prudhvi Chandra, Damini Bhatlaa	04:07
5.	"Alaba Alabalaba"	Ritesh G Rao	Thaman S	Sahithi Galidevara	1:32

Tamil
No.	Title	Lyrics	Music	Artist(s)	Length
1.	"Ona Suthi Suthi"	Kalapradah	Thaman S	Ranjith, Sameera Bharadwaj	04:10
2.	"Gandarabai"	Kalapradah	Thaman S	Deepak Blue, Roshini JKV	03:51
3.	"Dummare Dumma"	Kalapradah	Thaman S	Sarath Santosh, Srivardhini	04:11
4.	"Cult Mama"	Kalapradah	Thaman S	Aditya Iyengar, Ananya Bhaskar	04:07
5.	"Alaba Alabalaba"	Kalapradah	Thaman S	Priya Pidaparty	1:32

Malayalam
No.	Title	Lyrics	Music	Artist(s)	Length
1.	"Nee Thottu Thotta"	Deepak Ramakrishnan	Thaman S	Arjun Vijay, Nayana Nair	04:10
2.	"Gandarabai"	Deepak Ramakrishnan	Thaman S	Saketh, Sahiti Chaganti	03:51
3.	"Gummare Gumma"	Deepak Ramakrishnan	Thaman S	Yazin Nizar, Valli Gayathri	04:11
4.	"Cult Mama"	Deepak Ramakrishnan	Thaman S	Saicharan Bhaskaruni, Sony Komanduri	04:07
5.	"Alaba Alabalaba"	Deepak Ramakrishnan	Thaman S	Priya Pidaparty	1:32

== Release ==
Skanda was initially scheduled to be released on 20 October 2023 in Telugu along with dubbed versions of Hindi, Tamil, Kannada and Malayalam languages, but was preponed to 28 September 2023.

=== Home media ===
The satellite rights of the film acquired by Disney Star in regional languages, while the Hindi version were sold to Zee Cinema. Disney+ Hotstar acquired the digital streaming rights for the film and was premiered on 2 November 2023 in Telugu, Tamil, Malayalam and Kannada languages.

Despite the financial disappointment of the original version, the film's Hindi dubbed version surpassed 100 million views on YouTube, with over a million likes since its premiere on 17 June 2024.

== Reception ==
=== Critical response ===
Skanda received negative reviews from critics

Neeshita Nyayapati of The Times of India gave 2/5 stars and wrote "Skanda is not a film you expect logic from, but when it has only Ram and a few action sequences going for it, there's not much left to entertain either."

Prakash Pecheti of The South First gave 1.5/5 stars and wrote "Skanda is a regular, routine and formulaic narrative of Boyapati Srinu. It induces meaningless opium into mass audiences with a logicless story and absurd comedy and might even spoil the day of revelry during Ganesh immersion." Srivathsan Nadadhur of OTTplay gave 1/5 stars and wrote "Skanda is a film that'll even make Boyapati's previous dud - Vinaya Vidheya Rama - seem infinitely better. There's not much to say here, it's just a bad day at work for the filmmaker. Ram Pothineni's script selection woes continue and composer Thaman, who's a natural with action entertainers, misses the bus by a wide margin." Abhilasha Cherukuri of Cinema Express gave 1/5 stars and wrote "Skanda might just be the last nail in the coffin that is the Boyapati formula".

Sangeetha Devi Dundoo of The Hindu criticized the film and wrote "Skanda is bloated with no innovation in storytelling, characterisations, music or action choreography. It is so relentless in its celebration of high-decibel mass fest that you may want to keep your noise-cancelling earphones handy. Towards the end, when we learn there is going to be a part two, it sounds like a threat." BVS Prakash of Deccan Chronicle criticized the characterization and screenwriting, while terming it as a "mindless gory action saga".

== Future ==
The film's ending scene showcases the tagline "Unfolding in Skanda - II", indicating that story of doppelgänger will unfold in a second part. Though Boypati later said in an interview that he will not be continuing with a sequel as the film did not perform well at the box-office.
