= Guru Randhawa =

Indian singer and composer (born 1991)

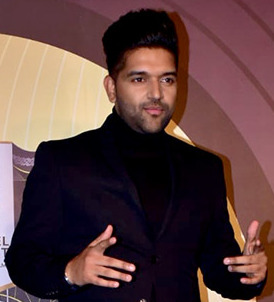
- Randhawa in 2019
- Born: Gursharanjot Singh Randhawa; 30 August 1991 (age 35); Noorpur, Punjab, India
- Occupations: Singer; lyricist; composer; producer
- Years active: 2012–present
- Musical career
- Genres: Pop; Indi-pop; R&B
- Labels: T-Series; Warner Music India
- Website: gururandhawa.com

Gursharanjot Singh "Guru" Randhawa (born 30 August 1991) is an Indian singer, songwriter and music composer associated with Punjabi, bhangra, indi-pop and Bollywood music. Guru Randhawa's debut song was "Same Girl" in collaboration with Arjun. He is known for his songs "Lahore", "Ishare Tere", "Slowly Slowly", and "Tere Te".

== Biography ==
Gursharanjot Singh Randhawa was born on 30 August 1991, in Noorpur, Dera Baba Nanak tehsil, Gurdaspur district, Punjab, India. He started by doing small shows in Gurdaspur and then began performing in Delhi, at small parties and functions. While staying in Delhi, Randhawa completed his MBA. He was named "Guru" by the rapper Bohemia who would shorten his full name while on stage.

== Career ==
=== 2012–2014: Beginnings ===
Randhawa started his music journey in December 2012 with a song named "Same Girl" with Arjun who was the first person to take Randhawa in his own video. However, the song was not so successful for both artists.

At the beginning of 2013, Randhawa released his first single named "Chhad Gayi" on YouTube with the label of Speed Records. His elder brother, Ramneek helped him financially to release this song. Later in 2013, he launched his first album Page One and released three songs from the album. "Dardan Nu", "I Like You" and "Southall" were the respective songs. Randhawa launched many songs but none of them became much popular to take Randhawa to heights. 2014 was also not special for him. He released the remaining songs from the Page One album but did not get success. The songs were "Khali Bottlan", "My Jugni", "Maa", "Na Na Na Na Na", "Pyaar Wale Test", "Modern Thumka", and "Billo On Fire".

=== 2015–2016: Popular in cultures ===
Bohemia, who was a well-wisher of Randhawa, requested T-Series to launch the young artist on their channel. Then they collaborated on the song "Patola". This song gathered more than 368 Million views across YouTube. "Patola" also got the award for best Punjabi Duo. Further, he sang with Ikka Singh in the songs "Outfit" and "Khat". In 2016, Randhawa gave four blockbuster songs. He released "Yaar Mod Do" with Millind Gaba again on the label T-Series in January. The motive of the project was to show true friendship and it did and collected more than 252 million YouTube views. In April, Randhawa dropped the song "Tu Meri Rani" on his own YouTube channel. This song also featured the rapper, Haji Springer. One of his most popular songs, "Suit" was released in 2016. It was Randhawa's second collaboration with Arjun. It currently holds 478 million views on YouTube. In September, he collaborated with Rajat Nagpal and released a song named Fashion on T-Series. The song holds more than 254 million views on YouTube currently.

=== 2017–present ===
In 2017, Randhawa released an emotional track named "Taare" in January. The track performed average on YouTube and the song's music video was trolled for allegedly plagiarising Zayn Malik's song "It's You". Randhawa made his Bollywood singing debut in the Indian movie Hindi Medium. His track "Suit" was recreated in the film as "Suit Suit".

He sang in the 2017 Indian Premier League opening ceremony. Later in 2017, his two tracks appeared in Bollywood movies. His old track "Tu Meri Rani" was recreated in the Hindi film Tumhari Sulu and an original track named "Lagdi Hai Thaai" was also released in the movie Simran in collaboration with Jonita Gandhi.

His two most-viewed songs, "High Rated Gabru" and "Lahore", have over 1.1 billion and 1 billion views on T-Series' official YouTube channel respectively. In 2018 "Lahore" won Track of the Year at the Brit Asia TV Music Awards, where Randhawa also won Best Male Act. His first international collaboration was "Slowly Slowly" featuring Pitbull, released on 19 April 2019. The song's music video received 38 million views on YouTube within 24 hours, becoming one of the world's all-time most-viewed music videos in 24 hours.

In 2019, Randhawa produced the Punjabi language film Tara Mira starring Ranjit Bawa and Nazia Hussan, directed by Rajiev Dhingra. In 2020, Randhawa made his second international collaboration "Surma Surma" with British artist Jay Sean.

In the year 2020, Randhawa's old track "Lahore" was presented as "Lagdi Lahore Di" in the movie 'Street Dancer 3D' in collaboration with Sachin–Jigar and Tulsi Kumar. During the Corona pandemic, he released a soothing track named 'Satnam Waheguru' with Vee. He was also featured in a music video for the track "Mueve La Cintura" by Pitbull with Tito El' Bambino, which is included in Pitbull's album Libertad 548. This was his second collaboration with Pitbull. Randhawa's popularity rose immensely after his Bollywood debut in the film Hindi Medium and the release of the pop ballad "Lahore" in 2018. He was featured in a cover story by Rolling Stone India, which stated, "If you've missed him on the charts, you've heard him on the radio".

In 2021, he released "Mehendi Wale Haath", followed by "Doob Gaye", which became very popular, crossing 50 million views, 3 days after its release. In December, his song "Dance Meri Rani" became an instant hit and has garnered over 240 million views on YouTube as of May 2023.

In 2022, he released "Punjabiyan Di Dhee", "Tera Saath Ho" and few other songs. The song "Designer" with Yo Yo Honey Singh, garnered more than 21 million views on YouTube within the first 24 hours and was a hit.

In 2026, he released the single, "Fine Shyt", which received widespread backlash and trolling for its lyrics and the portrayal of women in the music video for the song. Earlier, his 2025 song "Azul" had received similar criticism for its objectionable portrayal of teenage girls in the music video for the song.

== Media ==
Randhawa was ranked in The Times Most Desirable Men at No. 23 in 2018.

He was also ranked in the Chandigarh Times Most Desirable Men at No. 4 in 2019 and No. 6 in 2020.

== Discography ==
Denotes albums that have not yet been released

=== Albums ===
Year	Album	Music Composer(s)	Writer(s)	Tracks	Language(s)	Music Label	Ref
2013	Page One	Sacch, Paivvy	Guru Randhawa	10	Punjabi	Page1 Records	
2022	Man of the Moon	Guru Randhawa, Vee, Sanjoy	Guru Randhawa	7	Punjabi /Hindi	T-Series	
2023	G Thing	Guru Randhawa, Sanjoy	Guru Randhawa	9	Punjabi /Hindi	T-Series	
2025	Without Prejudice	Guru Randhawa	Guru Randhawa	10	Punjabi /Hindi /English	Guru Randhawa/Warner Music India	

=== Singles ===
Denotes songs that have not yet been released

Year	Song	Music	Writer(s)	Peak Chart Position	Language(s)	Co-artist(s)	Notes	Ref
Year	Song	Music	Writer(s)	UK Asian	Language(s)	Co-artist(s)	Notes	Ref
2013	"AK 47"	Kuwar Virk	Guru Randhawa		Punjabi			
2012	"Same Girl"	Preet Hundal	Guru Randhawa		Punjabi			
2013	"Chhad Gayi"	Musical Doctorz	Guru Randhawa		Punjabi			
2013	"Dardan Nu"	Sachh	Guru Randhawa		Punjabi		From the album Page One	
2013	"Southall"	Paivy	Guru Randhawa		Punjabi		From the album Page One	
2013	"I Like You"	Guru Randhawa, Paivy	Guru Randhawa		Punjabi			
2015	"Patola"	Preet Hundal	Guru Randhawa, Sabi		Punjabi	Bohemia		
2015	"Lahore"	Preet Hundal	Guru Randhawa, Vee Music		Punjabi		1 billion+ views on YouTube	
2015	"Outfit"	Guru Randhawa, Ikka			Punjabi			
2015	"Khat"	Intense	Ikka		Punjabi	Ikka		
2016	"Fashion"	Rajat Nagpal	Guru Randhawa		Punjabi			
2016	"Yaar Mod Do"	Millind Gaba	Guru Randhawa, Millind Gaba		Punjabi	Millind Gaba		
2016	"Tu Meri Rani"	Haji Springer			Punjabi	Haji Springer		
2017	"Taare"	Rajat Nagpal	Guru Randhawa		Punjabi			
2017	"Suit"	Intense	Guru Randhawa, Arjun	4	Arjun			
2017	"High Rated Gabru"	Guru Randhawa, Manj Musik	Guru Randhawa		Hindi / Punjabi		1 billion+ views on YouTube	
2018	"Raat Kamaal Hai"	Guru Randhawa, Tulsi Kumar	Guru Randhawa		Hindi / Punjabi		Featuring Khushali Kumar	
2018	"Made in India"	Guru Randhawa, Vee	Guru Randhawa		Hindi / Punjabi			
2018	"Ishare Tere"	Guru Randhawa	Guru Randhawa		Hindi / Punjabi	Dhvani Bhanushali		
2018	"Aaja Ni Aaja"	Guru Randhawa, Kuwar Virk	Guru Randhawa		Hindi / Punjabi	Punjabi	For film Mar Gaye Oye Loko	
2018	"Downtown"	Guru Randhawa, Vee Music	Guru Randhawa			Punjabi		
2018	"Golimaar"	Guru Randhawa, Vee Music	Guru Randhawa		Hindi / Punjabi		Lyrical video	
2018	"Tere Te"	Vee	Guru Randhawa		Hindi / Punjabi	Ikka		
2019	"Slowly Slowly"	DJ Shadow Dubai	Guru Randhawa, Pitbull		Punjabi / English/ Spanish/ Hindi	Pitbull		
2019	"Sajan Rus Jave Tan"	Guru Randhawa, DJ Shadow Dubai	Guru Randhawa		Punjabi		Unplugged version	
2019	"Ishq Tera"	Guru Randhawa	Guru Randhawa		Hindi / Punjabi		Featuring Nushrat Barucha	
2019	"Mueve La Cintura"	Pitbull	Pitbull, Guru Randhawa		English/Hindi/ Spanish/ Punjabi		As featured artist	
2019	"Black"	Bunty Bains	Bunty Bains		Punjabi		Featuring Krishna Mukherjee	
2019	"Yaari"	Guru Randhawa, Vee Music	Guru Randhawa		Hindi/Punjabi		Promotional song for MacDowells	
2020	"Surma Surma"	Vee Music	Guru Randhawa & Jay Sean		Hindi/Punjabi/English		Featuring Larrisa Bonessi	
2020	"Satnam Waheguru"	Vee Music	Guru Randhawa		Punjabi		Devotional song	
2020	"Teri Gali"	Vee Music	Guru Randhawa		Punjabi	Barbie Maan	As lyricist and producer	
2020	"Baby Girl"	Guru Randhawa	Guru Randhawa		Hindi/Punjabi	Dhvani Bhanushali		
2020	"Naach Meri Rani"	Tanishk Bagchi	Tanishk Bagchi		Hindi/Punjabi	Nikhita Gandhi	Featuring Nora Fatehi	
2021	"Mehendi Wale Haath"	Sachet–Parampara	Sayeed Quadri		Hindi		Featuring Sanjana Sanghi	
2021	"Aur Pyaar Karna Hai"	Sachet–Parampara	Sayeed Quadri		Hindi	Neha Kakkar		
2021	"Doob Gaye"	B Praak	Jaani		Hindi		Featuring Urvashi Rautela	
2021	"Nain Bengali"	Guru Randhawa	Guru Randhawa		Hindi/Punjabi/Bengali			
2021	"Aise Na Chhoro"	Manan Bhardwaj	Rashmi Virag		Hindi		Featuring Mrunal Thakur	
2021	"Dance Meri Rani"	Tanishk Bagchi	Rashmi Virag		Hindi	Zarah S Khan	Featuring Nora Fatehi	
2022	"Main Chala"	Shabbir Ahmed & Aditya Dev	Shabbir Ahmed		Hindi	Lulia Vantur	Featuring Salman Khan	
2022	"Punjabiyan Di Dhee"	Preet Hundal	Guru Randhawa		Punjabi	Bohemia	Featuring Neeru Bajwa	
2022	"Tera Saath Ho"	Tanishk Bagchi	Shabbir Ahmed		Hindi	Zahrah S Khan	Featuring Karan Wahi and Zahrah S Khan	
2022	"Designer"	Guru Randhawa & Yo Yo Honey Singh	Guru Randhawa & Yo Yo Honey Singh		Punjabi	Yo yo honey singh	Featuring Divya Khosla Kumar	
2022	"Signs"	Guru Randhawa & Sanjoy	Guru Randhawa		Punjabi		From album Man of the Moon	
2022	"Fake Love"	Sanjoy	Royal Maan, Amar Sandhu		Punjabi	Amar Sandhu	From album Man of the Moon	
2022	"Fayaah Fayaah"	Vee	Guru Randhawa		Punjabi	Vee	Featuring Nargis Fakhri From the album Man of the Moon	
2023	"Moon Rise"	Guru Randhawa	Guru Randhawa		Punjabi		Featuring Shehnaaz Gill From album Man of the Moon	
2025	"QATAL"	Sanjoy	Rony Ajnali, Gill Machhrai Guru Randhawa		Punjabi		Romantic Punjabi-pop song. Featuring Leads - Soundous Mufakir And Revati Mahurkar	
2025	"SIRRA"	Jaymeet	Rony Anjali, Gill Machhrai, Guru Randhawa		Punjabi	Kiran Bajwa		
2025	"AZUL"	Lavish Dhiman	Guru Randhawa, Gurjit Gill		Punjabi			

=== Film songs ===
Denotes films that have not yet been released

Year	Song	Film	Co-singer(s)	Composer(s)	Writer(s)	Note	Ref
2017	"Suit Suit"	Hindi Medium	Arjun	Guru Randhawa, Arjun, Rajat Nagpal	Arjun, Guru Randhawa	Hindi film	
2017	"Lagadi Hai Thaay"	Simran	Jonita Gandhi	Sachin–Jigar	Vayu	Hindi film	
2017	"Ban Ja Rani"	Tumhari Sulu	Solo	Guru Randhawa, Rajat Nagpal	Guru Randhawa	Hindi film	
2018	"Kaun Nachdi"	Sonu Ke Titu Ki Sweety	Neeti Mohan	Guru Randhawa, Rajat Nagpal	Guru Randhawa	Hindi film	
2018	"Nachle Na"	Dil Juunglee	Neeti Mohan	Guru Randhawa, Rajat Nagpal	Guru Randhawa	Hindi film	
2018	"Patola"	Blackmail	Solo	Guru Randhawa	Guru Randhawa	Hindi film	
2018	"High Rated Gabru"	Nawabzaade	Solo	Guru Randhawa	Guru Randhawa	Hindi film	
2018	"High Rated Gabru (Female Version)"	Nawabzaade	Aditi Singh Sharma	Guru Randhawa	Guru Randhawa	Hindi film	
2018	"Aaja Ni Aaja"	Mar Gaye Oye Loko	Solo	Guru Randhawa, Kuwar Virk	Guru Randhawa	Punjabi film	
2018	"Morni Banke"	Badhaai Ho	Neha Kakkar	Tanishk Bagchi	Mellow D	Hindi film	
2019	"Daaru Wargi"	Why Cheat India	Solo	Guru Randhawa	Guru Randhawa	Hindi film	
2019	"Main Deewana Tera"	Arjun Patiala	Solo	Sachin–Jigar, Guru Randhawa	Guru Randhawa	Hindi film	
2019	"Dil Todeya"	Arjun Patiala	Diljit Dosanjh	Sachin–Jigar, Guru Randhawa	Guru Randhawa	Hindi film	
2019	"Crazy Habibi Vs Decent Munda"	Arjun Patiala	Benny Dayal	Sachin-Jigar	Guru Randhawa	Hindi film	
2019	"Enni Soni"	Saaho	Guru Randhawa, Tulsi Kumar	Guru Randhawa	Guru Randhawa	Multilingual film	
2019	"Ekaantha Tharami"	Saaho	Shakthisree Gopalan, Haricharan	Guru Randhawa	Vinayak Sasikumar	Malayalam Dubbed version	
2019	"Mazhaiyum Theeyam"	Saaho	Shakthisree Gopalan, Haricharan	Guru Randhawa	Madhan Karky	Tamil version	
2019	"Ye Chota Nuvvunna"	Saaho	Haricharan, Tulsi Kumar	Guru Randhawa	Krishna Kanth	Telugu version; Multilingual	
2019	"Outfit"	Ujda Chaman	Solo	Preet Hundal	Guru Randhawa	Hindi film	
2019	"Ik Gera"	Tara Mira	Solo	Guru Randhawa	Guru Randhawa	Promotional song for Punjabi film	
2019	"Main Tera Tara Tu Meri Mira"	Tara Mira	Solo	Vee	Guru Randhawa	Punjabi film	
2020	"Lagdi Lahore Di"	Street Dancer 3D	Tulsi Kumar	Guru Randhawa and Sachin–Jigar		Hindi film	
2020	"Lahore-in Mangal"	Street Dancer 3D	Tulsi Kumar	Guru Randhawa and Sachin–Jigar	Veeramani Kannan	Tamil dubbed version of the Hindi film	
2020	"Ladki Lahore-u Nundi"	Street Dancer 3D	Tulsi Kumar	Guru Randhawa and Sachin–Jigar	Ramajoggaya Shastry	Telugu dubbed version of the Hindi film	
2020	"Teri Choriyaan "	Chhalaang	Payal Dev	Guru Randhawa-Vee	Guru Randhawa, Luv Ranjan	Hindi film	
2021	"Munde Mar Gaye"	Time To Dance	Solo	Guru Randhawa-Vee	Guru Randhawa	Hindi film	
2021	Chandigarh Kare Aashiqui 2.0	Chandigarh Kare Aashiqui	Zahrah S Khan, Jassi Sidhu	Tanishk Bagchi	Vayu	Hindi film	
2022	"Nain Ta Heere"	Jug Jugg Jeeyo	Asees Kaur	Vishal Shelke	Mohd. Khavar, Kumaar	Hindi film	
2022	"Nain Ta Heere (Lisa Version)"	Jug Jugg Jeeyo	Lisa Mishra	Vishal Shelke	Mohd. Khavar, Kumaar	Hindi film	
2023	"Suit Patiwala"	Yaariyan 2	Neha Kakkar, Manan Bhardwaj	Manan Bhardwaj		Hindi film	
2024	"Jeena Sikhaya"	Kuch Khattaa Ho Jaay	Parampara Tandon	Sachet-Parampara	Kumaar	Hindi film	
2024	"Bottley Kholo"	Kuch Khattaa Ho Jaay	Star Boy LOC	Meet Bros	Star Boy LOC	Hindi film	
2024	"Ishaare Tere"	Kuch Khattaa Ho Jaay	Zahrah S Khan	Guru Randhawa	Guru Randhawa, Zahrah S Khan	Hindi film	
2024	"Raja Rani"	Kuch Khattaa Ho Jaay	Solo	Guru Randhawa	Guru Randhawa	Hindi film	
2024	"Husn Irani"	Wild Wild Punjab	Solo	Guru Randhawa	Guru Randhawa	Hindi film	
2024	"Hauli Hauli"	Khel Khel Mein	Yo Yo Honey Singh, Neha Kakkar	Guru Randhawa	Guru Randhawa	Hindi film	
2024	"Baari Barsi"	Khel Khel Mein	Raj Ranjodh			Hindi film	
2025	"The Po Po Song"	Son of Sardaar 2	Solo	Tanishk Bagchi	Armaan Sharma, Shabbir Ahmed	Hindi film	
2025	"Perfect"	Sunny Sanskari Ki Tulsi Kumari	Solo	Guru Randhawa, Rony Ajnali, Gill Machhrai		Hindi film	

=== Recreated songs ===
- Guru Randhawa's Bollywood debut "Suit Suit" in the 2017 film Hindi Medium, was a remake of his and Arjun's track.
- His song "Tu Meri Rani" was recreated by him and Rajat Nagpal for the 2017 film Tumhari Sulu as "Ban Ja Rani".
- His song with Bohemia, "Patola", was recreated by him as a wedding song in the 2018 film Blackmail.
- His most viewed song "High Rated Gabru" was recreated by him in the 2018 film Nawabzaade.
- His single "Outfit" was recreated by him and music producer Aditya Dev in the 2019 film Ujda Chaman.
- His popular track "Lahore" was recreated by him, in collaboration with the composer duo Sachin–Jigar in the 2020 film Street Dancer 3D.
- Punjabi MC's song "Morni Banke" was recreated by Tanishk Bagchi featuring vocals from Guru and Neha Kakkar in the 2018 film Badhaai Ho.
- Jassi Sidhu's song "Chandigarh Kare Aashiqui", from his 2004 album Aashiqui, was recreated by Tanishk Bagchi, featuring vocals from Guru Randhawa and Zahrah S. Khan for the 2021 film Chandigarh Kare Aashiqui.

== Filmography ==
Key
†	Denotes films that have not yet been released

Year	Film	Role	Notes
2017	Hindi Medium	Himself	Special appearance in his Bollywood debut song "Suit Suit"
2018	Blackmail	Himself	Special appearance in his song "Patola"
2019	Why Cheat India	Himself	Special appearance in his song "Daaru Wargi"
2019	Ujda Chaman	Himself	Special appearance in his song "Outfit"
2021	Time To Dance	Himself	Special appearance in his song "Munde Mar Gaye"
2024	Kuch Khattaa Ho Jaay	Heer	Debut film
2024	Shahkot		Punjabi film
2025	Shaunki Sardar	Karan	Punjabi film
TBA	Shudh Vaishnu Daaka †		Filming
