= Lahore (song) =

Guru Randhawa song

Single by Guru Randhawa
- Released: 13 December 2017
- Genre: Bhangra; Indi-pop; EDM
- Length: 3:52
- Label: T-Series
- Composer: Guru Randhawa Vee music
- Lyricist: Guru Randhawa
- Producer: Vee Music

Music video
- "Lahore" on YouTube

Lahore is a Punjabi Indi-pop single by Guru Randhawa, released by T-Series on 13 December 2017. It is one of the most-streamed songs in India. It has over 1.5 billion views on YouTube. It was recreated by Sachin-Jigar as ''Lagdi Lahore Di'' from the film Street Dancer 3D (2020), voiced by Guru Randhawa and Tulsi Kumar.

== Background ==
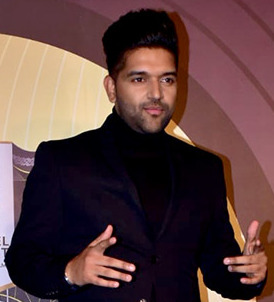
Guru Randhawa, singer of the song

In an interview to IANS, Randhawa said about "Lahore'" that "It's about a girl whom I have referred to from different places like Lahore, Delhi, Mumbai or London. I have compared her to Lahore's beauty, Mumbai's move, London's weather and so on. The beats of the song are peppy."

Asked about how he came up with the idea for the song, he said: "We were travelling by a car when the lyrics and beat came to my mind. It is basically describing a girl's beauty and comparing it to different places of the world."

The song is named after the city of Lahore, the capital of Pakistani Punjab. However, Randhawa mentioned in a January 2019 interview that he had never visited the city. He said, "I haven't been to Lahore, but we get calls from Pakistan for a music tour. In fact, I sat with my team and we are planning to go to Pakistan."

== Music video ==
The music video is shot mainly at Dubai. It features Randhawa in a modified Dodge Challenger R/T featuring Izabelle Leite. Randhawa is seen to be travelling on the Sheikh Zayed Road.

== Reception ==
It is one of the most-streamed hit songs in India. It was released by T-Series, and has received over 1.5 billion views on YouTube, becoming one of the most-viewed music videos on the T-Series channel. It is the 3rd most-viewed Punjabi Indi-pop music video on YouTube, and the platform's fourth most-viewed Indian music video, after the songs "Laung Laachi", "Vaaste", and "High Rated Gabru".

== Recreation ==
"Lagdi Lahore Di", a re-creation of the original song, co-composed by Sachin–Jigar for the film Street Dancer 3D, and sung by Guru Randhawa and Tulsi Kumar, was released in 2020, and has surpassed 500 million views on YouTube.

== Charts ==
It was well-received by audiences and within a month received around 153 million views on YouTube, reaching #17 on the Billboard YouTube charts. The Song reached No. 2 on the UK Asian Music Charts.

== Personnel ==
=== Audio ===
- Vocals - Guru Randhawa
- Lyrics - Guru Randhawa
- Background Music - Hassan Ejaz
- Composer - Guru Randhawa
- Mix/Master - Crossflow Recordings (London)

=== Music video ===
- Cast - Guru Randhawa, Izabelle Leite
- Music- Vee Music
- Video - DirectorGifty
- Choreographer - Amit Syal
- Costumes - Sheltun Benjamin
- Music Label - T-Series
