= Nilesh Ahuja =

Indian singer, songwriter and music composer

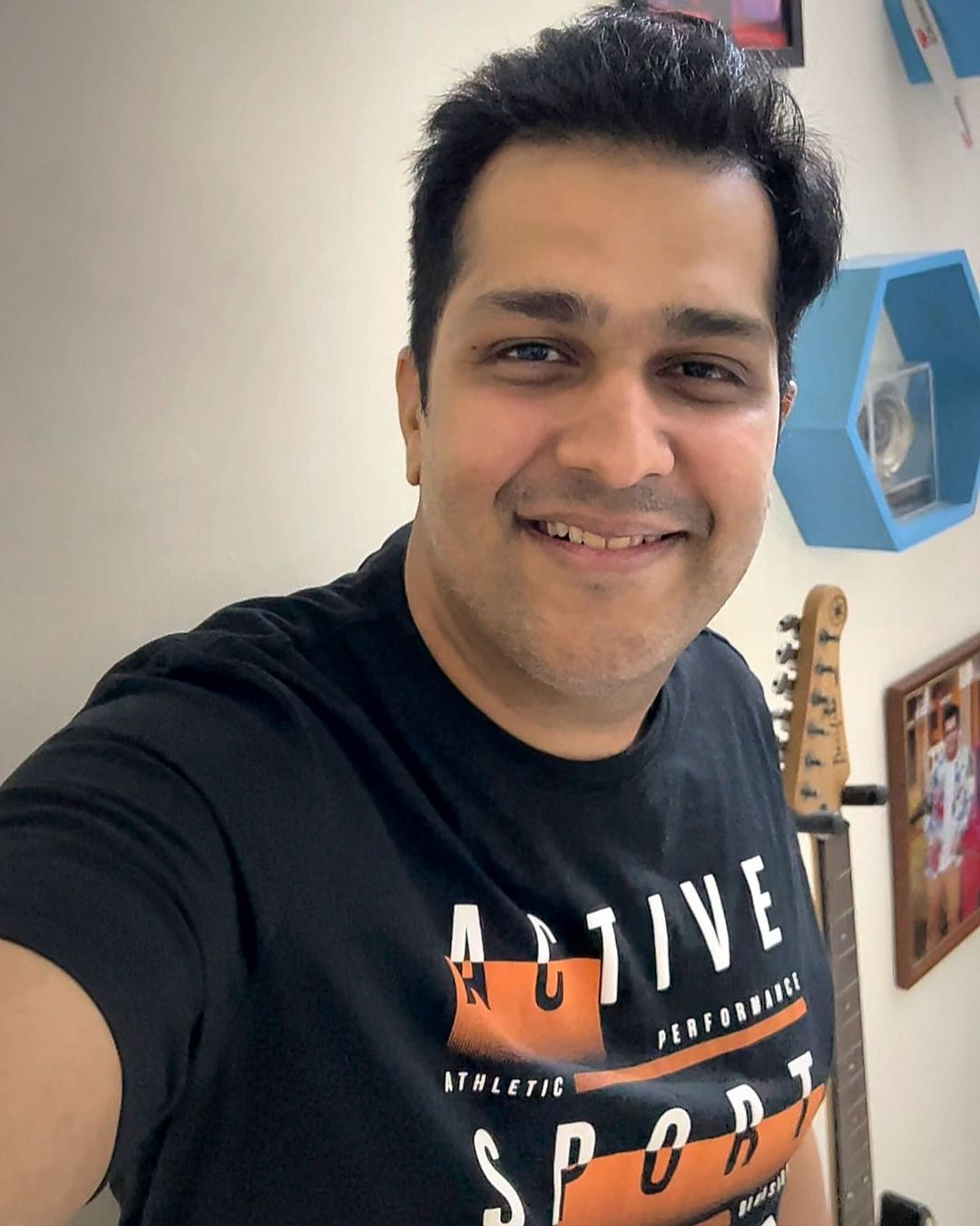
- Ahuja in 2023

Background information
- Born: New Delhi
- Genres: Pop, Hip Hop
- Occupations: Singer; Songwriter; Music composer
- Years active: 2021-present
- Labels: Zee Music Company; Saregama

Nilesh Ahuja is an Indian playback singer, songwriter and music performer who made his singing debut in Thoda Thoda Pyaar (2021) which has crossed over 225 million views.

Before his singing debut, Ahuja was known for composing music in advertising, including the one for IPL League. In an interview, Ahuja said he had an interest in music "from [his] school days." He further continued at his college in Delhi University, where he performed in "major festivals across the country".

== Discography ==
=== Singles ===
| Year | Title | Music | Lyrics | Notes | Ref. |
|---|---|---|---|---|---|
| 2021 | "Thoda Thoda Pyaar" | Zee | Kumaar | Debut | |
| 2021 | "Thoda Thoda Pyaar" | Zee | Kumaar | Female Version | |
| 2021 | "Zahir Kare" | Zee | Kumaar | | |
| 2021 | "Mehendi Lagi" | Zee | Kumaar | | |
| 2022 | "Jitna Tujhe Chahte Hai Hum" | Zee | Kumaar | | |
| 2023 | "Kuch Toh Zaroor Hai" | Sa Re Ga Ma | Kumaar | | |

=== Films ===
- Kuch Khattaa Ho Jaay (2024)
