= T-Series (company) =

Indian record label and film studio

Super Cassettes Industries Private Limited
- Trade name: T-Series
- Type: Private
- Industry: Music and entertainment
- Founded: 11 July 1983; 43 years ago in Delhi, India
- Founder: Gulshan Kumar
- Headquarters: Mumbai, India
- Key people: Bhushan Kumar (Chairman, managing director); Krishan Kumar; Neeraj Kalyan (President)
- Services: Music record label; Film production
- Owner: Gulshan Kumar (1983–1997); Bhushan Kumar (1997–present)

YouTube information
- Channel: T-Series
- Years active: 2006–present
- Genres: Music videos; Film trailers
- Subscribers: 316 million
- Views: 364 billion
- Last updated: 22 November 2026
- Website: tseries.com

Super Cassettes Industries Private Limited, doing business as T-Series, (Note: "T" is an abbreviation for trishula – the trident of Hindu god Shiva.) is an Indian record label and film studio founded by Gulshan Kumar on 11 July 1983. It is primarily known for Hindi film soundtracks and Indi-pop music. T-Series is the largest music record label in India, with up to a 35% share of the Indian music market. As of November 2026, T-Series also owns and operates the most-viewed and the second most-subscribed YouTube channel, with over 364 billion views and 316 million subscribers. While best known as a music label, T-Series has also produced more than 100 films, and has established itself as a leading film production company in Hindi cinema.

Kumar, initially a fruit juice seller in Delhi, founded T-Series to sell pirated Hindi songs before the company eventually began producing new music. Their breakthrough came with the soundtrack for the 1988 Bollywood blockbuster Qayamat Se Qayamat Tak, composed by Anand–Milind, written by Majrooh Sultanpuri, and starring Aamir Khan and Juhi Chawla, which became one of the best-selling Indian music albums of the 1980s, with over 8 million sales. They eventually became a leading music label with the release of Aashiqui (1990), composed by Nadeem–Shravan, which sold 20 million copies and became the best-selling Indian soundtrack album of all time. However, Gulshan Kumar was murdered by the Mumbai mafia syndicate D-Company on 12 August 1997. Since then, T-Series has been led by his son Bhushan Kumar and younger brother Krishan Kumar.

On YouTube, T-Series has a multi-channel network, with 43 channels (including Lahari Music) that have over 591.35 million subscribers as of 3 April 2025. The company's YouTube team consists of 13 people at the T-Series headquarters. The company's main T-Series channel on YouTube primarily shows music videos as well as film trailers. It became the most-viewed YouTube channel in January 2017. T-Series's channel was also the most-subscribed channel on YouTube from 14 April 2019 to 2 June 2024, until it was overtaken by MrBeast. The T-Series channel primarily features content in the Hindi language, and occasionally several other languages including Bhojpuri, Punjabi and English. T-Series also has several other channels dedicated to content in various Indian languages including Punjabi, Bhojpuri, Telugu, Tamil, Gujarati, Kannada, Haryanvi, Marathi, Bengali, Malayalam, Rajasthani, Himachali (Pahari), and Kashmiri. They also have dedicated channels for Hindu devotional content, health and fitness, as well as children's content featuring nursery rhymes, bedtime stories, and much more.

== History ==
T-Series was founded on 11 July 1983 by Gulshan Kumar, at the time a fruit juice seller in the Daryaganj neighbourhood of Delhi. The company initially sold pirated Hindi film songs, prior to releasing original music. Back then, the Indian audio cassette market was small-scale, with widespread piracy, but there was growing demand for cassette music. According to Rediff, while Kumar "was involved in piracy, he was passionately market- and consumer-driven." The company also took advantage of loopholes in copyright law allowing for the release of cover versions of songs, which T-Series would then flood the market with.

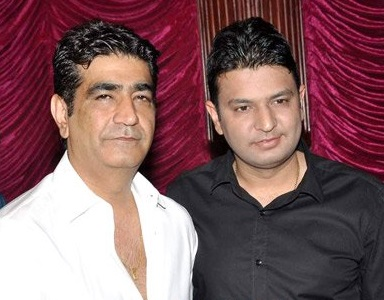
Krishan Kumar (left) and CEO Bhushan Kumar (right), the brother and son of Gulshan Kumar, respectively, during the audio release of Aashiqui 2 (2013)

Kumar discovered that there was also a market for devotional music, and began recording and selling it. Kumar noticed that many elderly Hindu followers could not read hymns and chants because of failing eyesight, so Kumar hired singers to record the chants and sold them as cheap cassettes. Later, he filmed major Hindu pilgrimages in India and sold them on VHS and video cassette tapes.

T-Series' first original film soundtrack release was for Lallu Ram in 1984, with music scored by Ravindra Jain. The company's breakthrough came when it released the soundtrack for the 1988 film Qayamat Se Qayamat Tak (also known as QSQT), directed by Mansoor Khan and starring Aamir Khan and Juhi Chawla. The Qayamat Se Qayamat Tak soundtrack, composed by Anand–Milind and written by Majrooh Sultanpuri, became the best-selling Indian soundtrack album of 1988 and one of the best-selling Indian soundtrack albums of the 1980s, with more than 8 million units sold. The biggest hit song from the album was "Papa Kehte Hain", sung by Udit Narayan and picturised on Aamir Khan. T-Series founder Gulshan Kumar soon played a key role in Hindi film music's cassette boom of the late 1980s with his affordable T-Series albums.

T-Series later became a leading music label with the release of Aashiqui (1990), directed by Mahesh Bhatt. The Aashiqui film soundtrack album, composed by the duo Nadeem–Shravan, sold 20 million units in India, and is the best-selling Hindi film soundtrack album of all time. A cover version of "Dheere Dheere" from Aashiqui was later sung by Yo Yo Honey Singh and released by T-Series in 2015.

T-Series was largely responsible for sparking a boom for the Indian music industry in the early 1990s. Many of the best-selling Hindi music albums of the 1990s, particularly those composed by Nadeem–Shravan, were released under the T-Series label. Besides music production, the company also began venturing into film production. The annual earnings of T-Series grew from ₹20 crore ($16 million) in 1985 to ₹200 crore ($88 million) in 1991, and by 1997 had reached ₹500 crore ($140 million).

In 1997, T-Series founder Gulshan Kumar was murdered by the Mumbai mafia syndicate D-Company. His assassination also led to T-Series losing its most prolific musicians at the time, Nadeem–Shravan, due to Nadeem Akhtar Saifi initially being accused of involvement in the murder, before later being exonerated. After Gulshan Kumar's death in 1997, the company has since been led by his son Bhushan Kumar, with the help of Gulshan's younger brother Krishan Kumar.

As a film production company, T-Series has had some moderate success. The highest-grossing T-Series film production to date is the critically acclaimed sleeper hit Hindi Medium (2017), written by Zeenat Lakhani, directed by Saket Chaudhary, and starring Irrfan Khan and Saba Qamar. It grossed ₹322.4 crore ($33 million) worldwide, with $34 million in China alone, becoming one of the top 20 highest-grossing Indian films of all time. One of the most expensive Indian films was T-Series's Saaho, a sci-fi thriller with a production budget of ₹300 crore (equivalent to ₹407 crore or US$43 million in 2026), released in 2019.

== YouTube presence ==
T-Series joined YouTube on 13 March 2006, but only started uploading videos in late 2010. The T-Series YouTube channel is run by a team of 13 people at the T-Series headquarters. Under this channel, T-Series primarily shows music videos and film trailers.

By July 2013, it had crossed 1 billion views, becoming the second Indian YouTube channel to cross the milestone after Rajshri Productions. In January 2017, T-Series surpassed PewDiePie to become the world's most-viewed YouTube channel, and as of July 2025 it has over 306 billion views. On 10 September 2018, the channel received a Custom Ruby Play Button on reaching 50 million subscribers. It is also the second channel ever to hit 70 million subscribers. On 29 May 2019, T-Series became the first channel to reach 100 million subscribers, and in December 2021, became the first channel to reach 200 million subscribers. Over 2 time periods, T-Series was the most-subscribed YouTube channel; a 5-day period in March 2019, and a 1,876 day period between April 2019 and June 2024.

As of September 2025, T-Series has over 304 million subscribers, making it the second most-subscribed YouTube channel, behind MrBeast. On average, T-Series gains 76,000 subscribers daily.

T-Series channel also owns a multi-channel network, with 29 channels (excluding Lahari Music), which include YouTube channels such as T-Series Telugu, T-Series Tamil, Bollywood Classics, T-Series Kids Hut, T-Series Apna Punjab, T-Series Kannada, Shabad Gurbani, Health And Fitness, T-Series Bhakti Sagar (mainly dedicated to Hindu devotional music, and to a lesser extent Jain, Sikh, Muslim, Buddhist and Christian), Pop Chartbusters, T-Series Malayalam, T-Series Classics, T-Series Regional, hamaarbhojpuri, T-Series Gujarati, T-Series Marathi, T-Series Bhavageethegalu & Folk, Bhakti Sagar Telugu, Bhakti Sagar Tamil, Bhakti Sagar Malayalam, T-Series Bhakti Marathi, Bhakti Sagar Kannada, T-Series Islamic Music, T-Series Kids Hut-Portuguese Fairy Tales, T-Series Haryanvi, T-Series Kids Hut-Telugu Kathalu, T-Series Kids Hut-Cuentos en Español and T-Series Kids Hut Tamil.

On top of this, seven of their channels are among the top 100 most-subscribed channels in India, including T-Series, Bhakti Sagar, Apna Punjab, Pop Chartbusters, Bollywood Classics, T-Series Regional, Lahari Music.

T-Series' 29 channels accumulated a total of more than 184 million YouTube subscribers as of July 2019. During January–July 2018, T-Series earned an income of ₹720 crore (equivalent to ₹976 crore or US$100 million in 2026) from YouTube. Online revenue contributes to at least 60% of the company's overall revenue.

The most popular song on the T-Series channel is "Dilbar" (2018), an updated version of a 1999 song from Sirf Tum originally composed by Nadeem–Shravan, reinvisioned by Tanishk Bagchi with Middle-Eastern musical influences, and a music video featuring Arabic belly dancing from Moroccan-Canadian dancer Nora Fatehi. It has become one of the most popular Hindi film music videos of all time, with its international success inspiring an Arabic language version released by T-Series, also featuring Nora Fatehi. "Dilbar" is popular across South Asia and the Arab world, with all versions of the song having received more than 1 billion views on YouTube. The most popular T-Series artist on YouTube is Punjabi language artist Guru Randhawa, whose song "Lahore" (2017) has crossed 1 billion views on YouTube. "Slowly Slowly", Guru Randhawa's collaboration with American rapper Pitbull released by T-Series, received 38 million views within a day, becoming one of the most-viewed music videos in 24 hours.

The growth of T-Series' YouTube channel has been attributed to India's emerging online population. A major breakthrough in India's Internet growth came in September 2016 with the advent of 4G network Reliance Jio, offering data at very low costs. India has since emerged as the world's second-largest online population (behind China, where YouTube is blocked), with YouTube alone having over 225 million monthly Indian users. India's high demand for YouTube content and the lack of local content creators has contributed significantly to the rapid growth of T-Series.

The growth of T-Series is also attributed to its growing audience outside of India. About 40% of the channel's traffic comes from outside of India, including 12% from the United States. The majority of the channel's overseas viewers belong to the global South Asian diaspora. More recently, the channel's overseas viewership has increased further, as a result of attention and controversy drawn to the channel by foreign YouTubers such as PewDiePie and MrBeast. On 22 February 2019 at 6:04 AM, T-Series surpassed PewDiePie for the first time to become the most-subscribed YouTube channel, with PewDiePie regaining the spot 8 minutes later. T-Series overtook PewDiePie in a similar manner many more times over the following weeks, and on 27 March, finally gained and maintained, until 1 April, the top spot by a fluctuating, but overall growing, margin. On 1 June 2024, MrBeast overtook T-Series and gained the top spot.

== Legal issues ==
In November 2007, T-Series filed a lawsuit against YouTube for infringing on the copyright of its music by allowing users to upload videos of its music onto YouTube, which could be accessed for free, and obtained an interim order against YouTube from the Delhi High Court, which restrained YouTube from infringing on its copyrights. T-Series and YouTube settled out of court in January 2011.

In April 2019, after PewDiePie released two diss tracks against T-Series, "Congratulations" and "Bitch Lasagna", T-Series filed a complaint with the Delhi High Court to have the songs removed from YouTube, arguing that they were "defamatory, disparaging, insulting, and offensive". Despite Kjellberg's statement that these diss tracks were "done in good fun", the court issued a temporary injunction in favour of T-Series on 8 April 2019 and access to the diss tracks on YouTube was blocked in India. In August 2019, it was reported that T-Series and PewDiePie had settled their legal disputes outside of court.

== See also ==
- List of T-Series films
- PewDiePie vs T-Series
- List of most-subscribed YouTube channels

== Notes ==
Achievements
Preceded by PewDiePie	Most Subscribed Channel on YouTube; 2019-2019	Succeeded by PewDiePie
Preceded by PewDiePie	Most Subscribed Channel on YouTube; 2019-2024	Succeeded by MrBeast
