= Zahrah S. Khan =

British actress and singer (born 1992)

- Born: Zara Agha Khan; London, England
- Other name: Sasha Agha
- Occupations: Singer, actor
- Spouse: Sachin Gupta (m. 2014–2015)
- Parents: Rehmat Khan (father); Salma Agha (mother)
- Relatives: Natasha Khan (half-sister); Rafiq Ghaznavi (maternal great grandfather); Nasrullah Khan (paternal grandfather)
- Family: Khan family (paternal) Agha family and Kapoor family (maternal)

Zahrah S. Khan (born Zara Agha Khan; 1 January 1992), also known as Sasha Agha, is a British actress and playback singer based in India. She has contributed to Bollywood as an actress and singer. Khan's first acting role was in the 2013 film Aurangzeb, and she began her playback singing career with the song "Barbadiyan" for the same movie. She sang tracks including "Kya Karte The Saajna" in Shubh Mangal Zyada Saavdhan (2020) and "Har Funn Maula" in Koi Jaane Na (2021).

== Family background ==
Khan was born to the Agha and Khan families, who have careers in film and sports. Zahrah's mother, Salma Agha, acted in Nikaah, a successful film that earned her a Filmfare Award for Best Singer. Khan's father Rahmat Khan himself was a squash coach who trained British open champions in squash as well as the Indian national champions. Through her father she is also the half-sister of singer Natasha Khan.

She married Indian singer and musician Sachin Gupta in 2014 but they separated after an year.

== Music career ==
Khan made her debut in singles with the song Khud se Zyada and then she took singing as a full-fledged career and sang Kya Karte The Saajna for the movie Shubh Mangal Zyada Saavdhan as her first playback in Bollywood.

== Discography ==
=== Originals/Music Videos ===
Year	Song	Co-singer(s)	Music label	Notes
2019	Khud Se Zyada	Tanishk Bagchi	VYRLOriginals	
2020	Jogan	Yasser Desai	Gaana Originals	Garnered 40 million plus streams within 2 months of the song release
2021	Dil Hai Deewana	Darshan Raval	T-Series	Featuring Arjun Kapoor & Rakul Preet Singh
2021	Dance Meri Rani	Guru Randhawa	T-Series	Featuring Nora Fatehi
2021	Beetein Lamhe-Madno	Tanishk Bagchi, and Abhijit Vaghani	T-Series	Cover of song by Beete Lamhein and Madno
2022	Mai Tennu Chad Jaungi	Solo	T-Series	Featuring Shaheer Sheikh
2022	Fakeeran	Solo	T-Series	Featuring Mouni Roy
2022	Tera Saath Ho	Guru Randhawa	T-Series	Featuring Karan Wahi
2022	Oops	King		
2023	Love Stereo Again	Tiger Shroff	T-Series	Recreation of song by Edward Maya
2023	Ek Tu Hi Hai	Stebin Ben	T-Series	Featuring Aditi Budhathoki
2024	Bin Tere	Tanishk Bagchi	Jjust Music	Song for Rakul Preet and Jackky Bhagnani's Wedding.

=== Film songs ===
Year	Song	Film	Co-singer(s)	Composer(s)	Lyrics	Music label	Notes
2013	Barbaadiyaan	Aurangzeb	Ram Sampath	Amartya Bobo Rahut	Puneet Sharma	YRF Music	Credited as "Sashaa Agha"
2020	Kya Karte The Saajna	Shubh Mangal Zyada Saavdhan	Anuradha Paudwal	Tanishk Bagchi	Vayu Shrivastav	T-Series	Remake
2020	Nayi Dhoop	Unpaused	Solo	Tanishk Bagchi	Rashmi Virag	Amazon Music	Amazon Prime Video anthology film
2020	Nayi Dhoop (Reprise)	Unpaused	Solo	Tanishk Bagchi	Rashmi Virag	Amazon Music	Amazon Prime Video anthology film
2021	Zindagi (Ittefaq)	Ajeeb Daastaans	Solo	Tanishk Bagchi	Tanishk Bagchi	Sony Music India	Netflix anthology film
2021	Dhoom Tara	Bell Bottom	Solo	Tanishk Bagchi	Tanishk Bagchi	Saregama Music	
2021	Sakhiyan 2.0	Bell Bottom	Maninder Buttar	Tanishk Bagchi	Tanishk Bagchi, Babbu, Maninder Buttar	Saregama Music	Remake
2021	Har Funn Maula	Koi Jaane Na	Vishal Dadlani	Tanishk Bagchi	Amitabh Bhattacharya	T-Series	
2021	Kusu Kusu	Satyameva Jayate 2	Dev Negi	Tanishk Bagchi	Rashmi Virag, Tanishk Bagchi	T-Series	
2021	Tenu Lehenga	Satyameva Jayate 2	Jass Manak	Tanishk Bagchi	Tanishk Bagchi, Jass Manak	T-Series	Remake
2021	Chandigarh Kare Aashiqui 2.0	Chandigarh Kare Aashiqui	Guru Randhawa, Jassi Sidhu	Tanishk Bagchi	Vayu	T-Series	Remake
2021	Dil Nahi Todna	Sardar Ka Grandson	Tanishk Bagchi	Tanishk Bagchi	Tanishk Bagchi	T-Series	Netflix film
2022	Aap Jaisa Koi	An Action Hero	Altamash Faridi	Tanishk Bagchi	Indeevar, Tanishk Bagchi	T-Series	Remake
2022	Aap Jaisa Koi (Film Version)	An Action Hero	Yash Narvekar	Tanishk Bagchi	Indeevar, Tanishk Bagchi	T-Series	Remake
2022	Mera Dil Gaaye Ja (Zooby Zooby)	Dhokha: Round D Corner	Yash Narvekar	Tanishk Bagchi	Kumaar, Anjaan	T-Series	Remake
2022	Nach Punjabaan	Jug Jug Jeeyo	Gippy Grewal, Tanishk Bagchi, Romy	Tanishk Bagchi	Tanishk Bagchi, Abrar-ul-Haq	T-Series	Remake
2022	Jaise Savan	Jug Jug Jeeyo	Tanishk Bagchi	Tanishk Bagchi	Tanishk Bagchi	T-Series	
2022	Aafat	Liger	Tanishk Bagchi	Tanishk Bagchi	Rashmi Virag	Sony Music India	
2022	Manchali	Liger	Farhad Bhiwandiwala	Tanishk Bagchi	Farhad Bhiwandiwala	Sony Music India	
2022	Kinna Sona	Phone Bhoot	Tanishk Bagchi	Tanishk Bagchi	Tanishk Bagchi	Zee Music Company	
2022	Saathiya	Cuttputlli	Nikhil D'Souza	Tanishk Bagchi	Tanishk Bagchi	Zee Music Company	Disney Plus Hotstar film
2023	Dilon Ki Doriyan	Bawaal	Vishal Mishra, Romy	Tanishk Bagchi	Arafat Mehmood	T-Series	Amazon Prime Video film
2023	Ghar Nahi Jaana	Gumraah	Armaan Malik, Salma Agha	Tanishk Bagchi	Rashmi Virag	T-Series	
2023	Kudiyee Ni Teri	Selfiee	The PropheC	Tanishk Bagchi	The PropheC, Tanishk Bagchi	Play DMF	Remake
2023	Gamey Gamey	Chatrapathi	Armaan Malik	Tanishk Bagchi	Mayur Puri	Junglee Music	
2024	Durr Na Karin	Khel Khel Mein	Vishal Mishra & Nabeel Shaukat Ali	Tanishk Bagchi	Kumaar, Khadim Hussain	T-Series	Remake
2024	Ishare Tere	Kuch Khattaa Ho Jaay	Guru Randhawa		Guru Randhawa, Zahrah S Khan	T-Series	
2025	"Rang"	Sky Force	Satinder Sartaaj	Tanishk Bagchi	Shloke Lal	Saregama	
2025	"Rehna Kol"	Loveyapa	Jubin Nautiyal	Tanishk Bagchi	Gurpreet Saini	Zee Music Company	
2025	"Chor Bazari Phir Se"	Bhool Chuk Maaf	Neeraj Shridhar, Sunidhi Chauhan, Pravesh	Tanishk Bagchi	Irshad Kamil	Sony Music India	Remake

=== Dancer ===
Year	Title	Roles	Notes
2026	I'm Game	Dancer	Dancer in the "Loser" song

== Filmography ==
Year	Film	Role	Director	Release date	Notes
2013	Aurangzeb	Ritu	Atul Sabharwal	17 May 2013	Debut film.
2014	Desi Kattey	Paridhi Rathore	Anand Kumar	26 September 2014	
2019	Khoj (short film)	Gurpreet (Gurri) - Lead	Kajri Babbar	13 January 2019	Premiered at the Cannes Film Festival, and then was nominated for The Student Academy Awards and reached the semi-finals.
2023	Imaginary Rain	Sarah (Prerna Malhotra's daughter)	Vikas Khanna	16 January 2023	
