= GOQii =

Indian fitness technology company

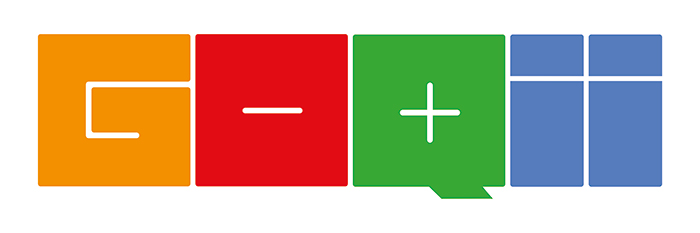
- Industry: Fitness Technology
- Founded: Menlo Park, California (February 26, 2014)
- Founder: Vishal Gondal
- Headquarters: Menlo Park, California
- Area served: India
- Key people: Vishal Gondal (CEO); Abhishek Sharma (COO); Sachin Janghel (CTO); Champ Alreja (CBO); Krishna Kumar (CCO); Akshay Kumar (Brand Ambassador and Advisor)
- Products: GOQii Vital, GOQii Run GPS, GOQii HR, GOQii Stride
- Number of employees: 200-250
- Website: goqii.com

GOQii (pronounced Go-Key) is an Indian fitness technology company, headquartered in California that offers a wearable fitness band with a mobile-app, and personalised remote health coaching. The company was founded by Vishal Gondal, the former CEO & Founder of Indiagames. After closing its beta program in April 2014, GOQii became commercially available in India in August 2014. The company has offices in Mumbai, India and Shenzhen, China and plans to expand its services to the Middle East, the United States, and Singapore. Investors include Sumeru Ventures, Animoca Brands, Mitsui, NEA, Megadelta, DSG Consumer Partners, Galaxy Digital, Denlow Investment Trust, Edelweiss, Cheetah Mobile, GWC, Mr Ratan Tata, Mr Akshay Kumar and Mr Vijay Shekhar Sharma.

== History ==
After selling his former startup, Indiagames to Disney in 2011 for approximately $100M, Vishal Gondal founded GOQii, a one on one mobile coaching and fitness tracking service.

Founded by Vishal Gondal, the board of directors includes Bala Deshpande, Alex Yao of Cheetah Mobile and Pravin Gandhi.

The other founders include Abhishek Sharma as Chief Operating Officer, Sachin Janghel as Chief Technology Officer and Champ Alreja as Chief Business Officer.

The company embarked on a beta program with 1000 subscribers in early 2014 before launching commercially in India in August.

In January 2015, the company launched a limited US beta only open to 500 initial customers in the U.S. Selected applicants receive 12 months of personal training through unlimited chat and monthly video calls over the company's mobile app, along with a free wearable device.

In April 2016, Amit Singhal of Google joined as one of the board of directors.

In December 2018, GOQii announced the launch of two new smart devices focusing on cardiac and diabetes care. The launch was aimed to be in March 2019.

== Products and services ==
GOQii has a wearable fitness band which collects users’ (called players) activity and sleep data. A personal coach is assigned to a player who reviews this data and communicates via mobile app to guide them towards their health and fitness goals.

A subscription fee is paid for personalized coaching and access to premium services. The GOQii companion app allows users to share their stats on social media and tracks Karma points.

The app also supports a Hi-5 feature wherein a coach can congratulate a user for being on track. Players earn Karma points when they meet their daily goals. They can use these points, which third party donors match in dollars, to donate to their chosen charity.

On August 4, 2016, in partnership with Thyrocare and Max Healthcare, GOQii launched its new version, which included a "personal Health Locker" and a lifestyle doctor (called the GOQii Doctor), who is a qualified physician (MBBS/MD) and available on the GOQii platform for medical consultation.

In addition, a player can also take a ‘Health Risk Assessment’ test and get their ‘Health Score’ via the app.

The Health Locker includes a diagnostics feature allows users to book tests, take them from home and get results directly.

In 2020, the company received $10 million in a Series C funding round from Hong Kong-based Animoca Brands. This investment was used in the development of GOQii’s health metaverse, an ecosystem where users are awarded virtual tokens based on their healthy behaviors and in turn those tokens can be used to purchase other products and services.

In 2024, GOQii and BharatBox partnered together for the release of the metaverse heath and wellness platform.

== Funding and partnerships ==
The company has raised funding from Angel Investors including Amit Singhal of Google, Neeraj Arora of WhatsApp, Marco Argenti of Amazon Web Services Mobile, Anil Godhwani of Habitera, Steve Luczo of Seagate, Mike McNamara of Flextronics, Kanwaljit Bombra of Dell, Vijay Vashee of Microsoft, Bollywood actress Madhuri Dixit Nene and Dr. Shriram Nene.

GOQii received $13.4 million in Series A funding led by New Enterprise Associates (NEA) and Cheetah Mobile Inc. with additional support from Great Wall Club (GWC), DSG Consumer Partners, Ilkka Paananen and Pravin Gandhi in November 2015.

Financial services firm Edelweiss entered a strategic partnership with GOQii and closed an investment round in early 2016. GOQii tied up with Axis Bank to collaborate on wearable devices for its customers offering them the fitness service and allowing them to make NFC payments from the device later in 2016.

On April 20, 2017, Max Bupa Health Insurance announced a three-way tie-up with GOQii and global reinsurance company Swiss Re to provide health and wellness offerings. With the emphasis placed by The Insurance Regulatory and Development Authority of India (IRDAI) on driving the shift from ‘illness to wellness’, the offerings will cater to the preventive health care needs of consumers. GOQii's "personalized wellness engine", equipped with solutions such as health coaching and health management tools would be offered under this tie-up along with Swiss Re's technical assistance in creating relevant products and expertise to create risk assessment models for the future.

== Harvard case study ==
In April 2017, GOQii became the third Indian startup after Flipkart and Paytm to be featured as a case study on the Harvard Business Publishing Platform, a subsidiary of Harvard University that brings out books, magazines and leadership studies for MBA students. Through the GOQii case study, students will obtain lessons on Artificial Intelligence, Entrepreneurship, Healthcare and Technology.

== Public health ==
On World Health Day 2017, GOQii introduced Sanjeevani, an initiative to expand its preventive health and wellness ecosystem to a wider audience with integration into public health care. The pilot project was launched on April 7, 2017 in the villages of Vaghadi and Charoti in the Palghar District of Maharashtra which has a combined population of over 2000. For the pilot project, GOQii worked closely with Member of Parliament, Poonam Mahajan, who has adopted the villages under Indian Prime Minister, Narendra Modi’s, Adopt a Village Scheme – ‘Sansad Adarsh Gram Yojana’ to convert the villages into a model village.
