= Sooryavanshi (soundtrack) =

2021 movie soundtrack album

Soundtrack album by Pritam, Tanishk Bagchi, Lijo George–DJ Chetas, Pav Dharia and JAM8
- Released: 7 November 2021
- Recorded: 2019–2021
- Genre: Feature film soundtrack
- Length: 18:30
- Language: Hindi
- Label: T-Series
External audio
- Sooryavanshi – Full Album Jukebox on YouTube

Sooryavanshi is the soundtrack album to the 2021 film of the same name directed by Rohit Shetty, which is the fourth instalment in Shetty's Cop Universe, starring Akshay Kumar in the titular role, alongside Katrina Kaif and featured Ranveer Singh and Ajay Devgn, reprising their roles from the previous films. The album featured five songs composed by Tanishk Bagchi, Lijo George–DJ Chetas and JAM8 while lyrics are written by Rashmi Virag, Shabbir Ahmed, Anand Bakshi and Bagchi. The album was released through T-Series label on 7 November 2021.

== Background ==
Sooryavanshi's soundtrack featured five songs. Tanishk Bagchi handled the task for recreating three songs from other films and albums. The only original composition being "Mere Yaaraa", a romantic song picturized on Kumar and Kaif, which was scored by JAM8; the theme song was composed by Lijo George–DJ Chetas.

In late June 2019, it was reported that the song "Tip Tip Barsa Pani" from the film Mohra (1994), which also starred Kumar with Raveena Tandon, would be recreated for this film. This was reported when Kumar and Kaif were shooting for that song, which had been choreographed by Farah Khan. The song was recorded by Udit Narayan and Alka Yagnik, who also did the same for the original song that released in 1994. Viju Shah, the composer of the original song, reacted to this an interview with singer Tushar Joshi for India Today, claiming that he did not feel that the song being recreated, or it sounded very different, but was similar to his version, and noted that the vocals of the original singers were retained making it even closer to the original. He referenced on his song "Aankh Maarey" from Tere Mere Sapne (1996) was recreated for Simmba, with the change in singers. Similarly, in an interaction with RJ Siddharth Kannan, Shetty addressed on the criticism from fans regarding the recreation but also admitted that it would revive interest on the current audiences to watch the original version as well.

== Release ==
The first song from the film "Aila Aila" was released on 21 October 2021. It is a recreation of the eponymous song composed by Pritam from the film Khatta Meetha (2010), which also starred Kumar. The music video also featured Kumar, along with Singh and Devgn. The second song "Mere Yaaraa" was released on 27 October, with a music video from the film picturized on Kumar and Kaif. The song "Najaa" was released as the third single on 3 November; it is a remake of the 2017 Punjabi song of the same name, originally created by Pav Dharia. The recreated version of the song "Tip Tip Barsa Paani", titled as "Tip Tip" was released on 7 November. The album was released on the same date under T-Series label. After the film's release, the song "Hum Hindustani" was released on 26 December under the Saregama label; it was adapted from the eponymous song originally composed by Usha Khanna and written by Prem Dhawan.

== Reception ==
Archika Khurana of The Times of India noted the songs were "not particularly memorable" while complimenting the revamped version of "Najaa" being an earworm, she found the lead actors' dancing to "Aila Re Aillaa" being "entertaining". Joginder Tuteja of Rediff.com called the music "exhilarating".

== Track listing ==
Original track list
No.	Title	Lyrics	Music	Singer(s)	Length
1.	"Aila Re Aillaa"	Shabbir Ahmed, Nitin Raikwar	Tanishk Bagchi, Pritam	Daler Mehndi	2:36
2.	"Mere Yaaraa"	Rashmi Virag	JAM8	Arijit Singh, Neeti Mohan	4:45
3.	"Najaa"	Tanishk Bagchi, Pav Dharia, Manav Sangha, Don Jaan	Tanishk Bagchi, Pav Dharia	Pav Dharia, Nikhita Gandhi	3:11
4.	"Tip Tip"	Anand Bakshi, Tanishk Bagchi	Tanishk Bagchi, Viju Shah	Udit Narayan, Alka Yagnik	4:10
5.	"Sooryavanshi Theme"	—	Lijo George – Dj Chetas	Lijo George	1:48
Total length:					18:30

Non-album single
No.	Title	Lyrics	Music	Singer(s)	Length
6.	"Hum Hindustani"	Prem Dhawan	Usha Khanna, Tanishk Bagchi	Various Artists	2:00
Total length:					18:30
