= Tanishk Bagchi =

Indian music producer, composer, lyricist and singer

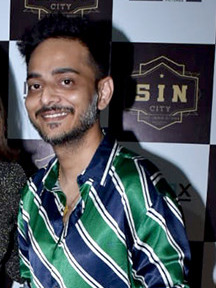
- Bagchi graces Dhvani Bhanushali's success bash of Vaaste, 2019

Background information
- Born: 23 November 1980 (age 45); Kolkata, West Bengal, India
- Genres: Filmi; Bollywood; Pop; Punjabi; EDM
- Occupations: Music producer; composer; arranger; singer; lyricist
- Years active: 2007–present
- Labels: Shemaroo Music; Ektaar Music; T-Series; Zee Music Company; Sony Music India; Saregama; Tips; Eros Music

Tanishk Bagchi (Bengali pronunciation: [toniʃko baɡt͡ʃi]; born 23 November 1980) is an Indian music producer, composer, singer and lyricist in Hindi films. He is known for tracks like "Vaaste", "Bolna", "Ve Maahi", "Aankh Maarey" (recreated), "Dilbar" (recreated), "Jehda Nasha" (recreated) and "Lut Gaye" (recreated).

== Early life and background ==
Tanishk Bagchi was born to musicians Nand Kumar Bagchi and Sharmistha Das and hails from Kolkata, West Bengal. He attended the Frank Anthony Public School and the Scottish Church College.

== Career ==
Bagchi released the Bengali-language album City Life in 2007. Bagchi later worked as a music producer alongside Aditya Dev in the song Meherbani, composed and written by Arko Pravo Mukherjee for the film 2014 film The Shaukeens. Bagchi collaborated with lyricist Vayu Srivastava for a single Oopar Oopar Renn De. Anurag Kashyap liked it and led the duo to a person named Ravi Adhikari, a close relative to the director of the 2015 film Tanu Weds Manu Returns, Aanand L. Rai. The duo then made their debut in Bollywood with the song Banno. Before composing for films, he produced and arranged music for TV shows like Thapki...Pyar Ki etc. Bagchi debuted as a solo composer in the song Samandar in Kis Kisko Pyaar Karoon.

In 2018, Bagchi composed the soundtrack album of the film Loveyatri, with DJ Chetas-Lijo George and JAM8. Bagchi made his Telugu debut in the song "Adbhutam" from the film Lover. He, along with Vayu, composed the new Red FM Jingle, which includes the voice of Rajnigandha Shekhawat and the lyrics were written by Vayu. He also recreated two songs that year - Dilbar in the film Satyamev Jayate which received 20 million views in its first 24 hours of release on YouTube, and Aankh Maarey for Simmba which became the party anthem of 2018-19 New Year's parties. Aankh Maarey crossed 1 billion views in 2021.

In 2019, Bagchi was nominated as the best lyricist for his song Ve Maahi from the 2019 film Kesari at the 65th Filmfare Awards. He later released his single "Khud Se Zyada" with the independent record label VYRL originals as a singer-songwriter.

In 2021, he composed and produced the official anthem for Fearless And United- Guards, a game developed by nCore games. The anthem was released by actor-producer Akshay Kumar on 3 January 2021.

Bagchi composed the song "Har Funn Maula" for the film Koi Jaane Na. The song featured actors Aamir Khan and Elli AvrRam. The song marked the first collaboration between Bagchi and singer Vishal Dadlani, who had earlier criticised the former for remaking the song "O Saki Saki", which was originally created by Vishal–Shekhar.

== Collaborations with other artists ==
- Tanishk Bagchi's first song as a solo composer Samandar from the film Kis Kisko Pyaar Karoon was sung by Jubin Nautiyal and Shreya Ghoshal. Since then, Bagchi and Nautiyal have collaborated for more tracks- The Humma Song from Ok Jaanu, Tera Junoon from Machine, Socha Hai from Baadshaho, Raat Baaki from Ittefaq, Adbhutam from Lover, Sawarne Lage from Mitron, Akh Lad Jaave from Loveyatri, Bimar Dil from Pagalpanti, Haiya Ho from Marjaavaan. Their most successful collaboration'till date are Lut Gaye Single and Raataan Lambiyan from Shershaah.
- Actress Zahrah S Khan debuted as a singer with Tanishk Bagchi. The 2019 single Khud Se Zyada, which featured both of them, was Khan's first song as a singer. Later, Khan debuted in Bollywood as a singer by singing the rehashed version of Anuradha Paudwal's song Kya Karte The Sajna for the 2020 film Shubh Mangal Zyada Saavdhan, recreated by Bagchi. The two collaborated for a Gaana Original song called Jogan, which was sung by Khan and Yasser Desai and written and composed by Tanishk Bagchi. Zara Khan also sang the song Nayi Dhoop, a composition by Bagchi for Nikhil Advani's short film "Apartment" in 2020 anthology film Unpaused. In 2021, the two collaborated for Aamir Khan-Elli AvrRam song Har Fun Maula in the film Koi Jaane Na, recreated versions of popular Punjabi songs Sakhiyaan and Lehanga for the films Bell Bottom and Satyameva Jayate 2, respectively. Zara Khan also gave her voice to the background score of Akshay Kumar starrer film Bell Bottom's teaser, created by Tanishk Bagchi. The two had collaborated for Arjun Kapoor and Rakul Preet Singh starrer Dil Hai Deewana song, which also featured the voice of Darshan Raval and was a remake of Hassan Jahangir's song of the same name. For the same actor duo, Bagchi and Khan sang a song "Dil Nahi Todna" from Sardar Ka Grandson.
- Bagchi has collaborated many a times with singer Asees Kaur. The composer-singer duo has delivered hits like Akh Lad Jaave, Bolna, Ve Maahi, Chandigarh Mein, Raja Ganapati, Tu Lagdi Ferrari, Raataan Lambiyan etc.
- Bagchi is credited for the rise of Dhvani Bhanushali in the music industry. One of her first songs, Humsafar, which was originally composed by Akhil Sachdeva for Badrinath Ki Dulhania, was reprised by Bagchi for T-Series Acoustics. Her songs like Leja Re, Koka, Vaaste etc. were compositions of Bagchi. On working with Bagchi, she commented that he is her mentor. She said, "He has guided me really well. My career is mostly made because of him."

== Discography ==
=== Hindi film songs ===
Year	Film	Track(s)	Singer(s)	Writer(s)	Remake	Notes
2015	Kis Kisko Pyaar Karoon	"Samandar"	Jubin Nautiyal, Shreya Ghoshal	Arafat Mehmood	No	
2016	Kapoor & Sons	"Bolna"	Arijit Singh, Asees Kaur	Dr. Devendra Kafir	No	
2016	Sarbjit	"Rabba"	Shafqat Amanat Ali	Arafat Mehmood	No	
2016	Sarbjit	"Allah Hu Allah"	Shashaa Tirupati, Altamash Faridi, Rabbani Mustafa Khan	Haider Najmi	No	
2016	Housefull 3	"Fake Ishq"	Kailash Kher	Arafat Mehmood, Sajid-Farhad	No	
2016	Fever	"Besambhle"	Arijit Singh	A. M. Turaz	No	
2017	Ok Jaanu	"The Humma Song"	Jubin Nautiyal, Shashaa Tirupati, Badshah, Tanishk Bagchi	Mehboob, Badshah	Yes	Along with Badshah
2017	Noor	"Gulabi Retro Mix"	Sonu Nigam	Anand Bakshi	Yes	
2017	Badrinath Ki Dulhania	"Badri Ki Dulhania (Title Track)"	Dev Negi, Neha Kakkar, Monali Thakur, Ikka Singh	Shabbir Ahmed	No	Inspired From "Chalat Musafir"
2017	Badrinath Ki Dulhania	"Tamma Tamma Again"	Bappi Lahiri, Anuradha Paudwal, Badshah	Indeevar, Badshah	Yes	
2017	Machine	"Itna Tumhe"	Yasser Desai, Shashaa Tirupati	Arafat Mehmood	No	
2017	Machine	"Toh Hi Hai Mera"	Yasser Desai	Arafat Mehmood	No	
2017	Machine	"Tera Junoon"	Jubin Nautiyal	Arafat Mehmood	No	
2017	Machine	"Chatur Naar (Remake)"	Nakash Aziz, Shashaa Tirupati, Ikka	Niket Pandey, Ikka	Yes	
2017	Machine	"Cheez Badi"	Neha Kakkar, Udit Narayan	Anand Bakshi, Shabbir Ahmed	Yes	Along with Viju Shah
2017	Half Girlfriend	"Baarish"	Ash King	Arafat Mehmood, Tanishk Bagchi	No	
2017	Half Girlfriend	"Baarish"	Atif Aslam	Arafat Mehmood, Tanishk Bagchi	No	
2017	Half Girlfriend	"Baarish"	Jubin Nautiyal	Arafat Mehmood, Tanishk Bagchi	No	Dropped from the album
2017	Munna Michael	"Main Hoon"	Siddharth Mahadevan	Kumaar	No	
2017	Munna Michael	"Beat It Bijuriya"	Asees Kaur, Renesa Bagchi	Tanishk-Vayu	No	Along with Vayu
2017	Baadshaho	"Mere Rashke Qamar"	Rahat Fateh Ali Khan	Manoj Muntashir	Yes	
2017	Baadshaho	"Mere Rashke Qamar (Female Version)"	Tulsi Kumar	Manoj Muntashir	Yes	
2017	Baadshaho	"Socha Hai"	Jubin Nautiyal, Neeti Mohan	Manoj Muntashir	Yes	
2017	Baadshaho	"Socha Hai (2nd version)"	Jubin Nautiyal, Neeti Mohan	Manoj Muntashir	Yes	
2017	Bareilly Ki Barfi	"Sweety Tera Drama"	Dev Negi, Shraddha Pandit, Pawni Pandey	Shabbir Ahmed	No	
2017	Bareilly Ki Barfi	"Twist Kamariya"	Harshdeep Kaur,|Yasser Desai, Altamash Faridi, Tanishk Bagchi	Tanishk-Vayu	No	Along with Vayu
2017	Shubh Mangal Saavdhan	"Rocket Saiyan"	Ritu Pathak, Brijesh Shandilya, Tanishk Bagchi	Tanishk-Vayu	No	Along with Vayu
2017	Shubh Mangal Saavdhan	"Kanha"	Shashaa Tirupati	Tanishk-Vayu	No	Along with Vayu
2017	Shubh Mangal Saavdhan	"Kanha (Male)"	Ayushmann Khurrana	Tanishk-Vayu	No	Along with Vayu
2017	Shubh Mangal Saavdhan	"Laddoo"	Mika Singh	Tanishk-Vayu	No	Along with Vayu
2017	Shubh Mangal Saavdhan	"Kankad"	Shashaa Tirupati, Raja Hasan, Rajnigandha Shekhawat, Armaan Hasan	Tanishk-Vayu	No	Along with Vayu
2017	Poster Boys	"Kudiya Shehar Di"	Neha Kakkar, Daler Mehndi	Shabbir Ahmed, Javed Akhtar	Yes	
2017	Lucknow Central	"Baaki Rab Pe Chod De"	Brijesh Shandilya, Armaan Hasan, Tanishk Bagchi, Vayu	Kumaar	No	
2017	Ittefaq	"Raat Baki"	Jubin Nautiyal, Nikhita Gandhi	Tanishk Bagchi, Groot	Yes	
2017	Tumhari Sulu	"Hawa Hawai 2.0"	Shashaa Tirupathi, Kavita Krishnamurthy	Javed Akhtar	Yes	
2017	Tumhari Sulu	"Manva Likes to Fly"	Shalmali Kholgade	Vayu	No	
2018	Hate Story 4	"Aashiq Banaya Aapne"	Neha Kakkar, Himesh Reshammiya	Manoj Muntashir	Yes	
2018	Hate Story 4	"Naam Hai Mera"	Neeti Mohan	Shabbir Ahmed	Yes	
2018	Dil Juunglee	"Gazab Ka Hai Din"	Jubin Nautiyal, Prakriti Kakar	Tanishk Bagchi, Arafat Mehmood	Yes	
2018	Dil Juunglee	"Beat Juunglee"	Armaan Malik, Prakriti Kakar	Tanishk-Vayu	No	Along with Vayu
2018	Raid	"Sanu Ek Pal Chain"	Rahat Fateh Ali Khan	Manoj Muntashir	Yes	
2018	Raid	"Nit Khair Manga"	Rahat Fateh Ali Khan	Manoj Muntashir	Yes	
2018	Fanney Khan	"Jawan Hai Mohabbat"	Sunidhi Chauhan	Irshad Kamil	Yes	
2018	Satyameva Jayate	"Dilbar"	Neha Kakkar, Dhvani Bhanushali, Ikka	Shabbir Ahmed, Sameer, Ikka	Yes	
2018	Gold	"Monobina"	Yasser Desai, Monali Thakur, Shashaa Tirupati, Farhad Bhiwandiwala	Vayu	No	
2018	Mitron	"Sawarne Lage"	Jubin Nautiyal	Tanishk Bagchi	No	
2018	Mitron	"Sawarne Lage (Female Version)"	Nikhita Gandhi	Tanishk Bagchi	No	
2018	Mitron	"Chalte Chalte"	Atif Aslam	Tanishk Bagchi	Yes	
2018	Mitron	"Sanedo"	Darshan Raval, Raja Hasan	Tanishk-Vayu	No	along with Vayu
2018	Brij Mohan Amar Rahe	"Balma Yeh Karma"	Brijesh Shandilya, Jyotica Tangri	Vayu	No	along with Vayu
2018	Loveyatri	"Akh Lad Jaave"	Jubin Nautiyal, Asees Kaur, Badshah	Badshah, Tanishk Bagchi	No	
2018	Loveyatri	"Rangtaari"	Dev Negi, Raja Hasan, Yo Yo Honey Singh	Shabbir Ahmed, Yo Yo Honey Singh and Hommie Dilliwala	No	
2018	Loveyatri	"Tera Hua"	Atif Aslam	Manoj Muntashir, Arafat Mehmood, Shabbir Ahmed	No	
2018	Loveyatri	"Tera Hua (Unplugged)"	Atif Aslam, Asees Kaur	Manoj Muntashir, Arafat Mehmood, Shabbir Ahmed	No	
2018	Loveyatri	"Dholida"	Udit Narayan, Palak Muchhal, Neha Kakkar, Raja Hasan	Shabbir Ahmed	No	
2018	Jalebi	"Tera Mera Rishta (Duet)"	KK, Shreya Ghoshal	Arafat Mehmood	No	
2018	Jalebi	"Tera Mera Rishta (Male)"	KK	Arafat Mehmood	No	
2018	Badhaai Ho	"Badhaiyan Tenu"	Brijesh Shandilya, Romi, Jordan	Vayu	No	
2018	Badhaai Ho	"Morni Banke"	Guru Randhawa, Neha Kakkar	MellowD	Yes	
2018	Baazaar	"Kem Cho"	Jyotica Tangri, Ikka	Shabbir Ahmed, Ikka	No	
2018	K.G.F: Chapter 1	"Gali Gali Mein Phirta Hai"	Neha Kakkar	Anand Bakshi, Rashmi Virag	Yes	Kannada film (Hindi Dubbed)
2018	Zero	"Heer Badnaam "	Romy	Kumaar	No	
2018	Zero	"Tanha Hua"	Jyoti Nooran, Rahat Fateh Ali Khan	Irshad Kamil	Yes	
2018	Zero	"Dama Dum Mast"	Altamash Faridi	Traditional	Yes	
2018	Simmba	"Tere Bin"	Rahat Fateh Ali Khan, Asees Kaur	Rashmi Virag	Yes	
2018	Simmba	"Bandeya Re Bandeya"	Arijit Singh, Asees Kaur, Altamash Faridi	Rashmi Virag	No	
2018	Simmba	"Aankh Maarey"	Mika Singh, Neha Kakkar, Kumar Sanu	Shabbir Ahmed	Yes	
2018	Simmba	"Aala Re Aala"	Dev Negi, Goldie	Shabbir Ahmed	No	
2018	Simmba	"Simmba Theme 1"	Instrumental		No	
2019	Fraud Saiyyan	"Chamma Chamma"	Neha Kakkar, Arun, Romi, Ikka	Shabbir Ahmed, Ikka	Yes	
2019	Luka Chuppi	"Coca Cola Tu"	Tony Kakkar, Neha Kakkar	Tony Kakkar, MellowD	Yes	Along With Tony Kakkar
2019	Luka Chuppi	"Photo"	Karan Sehmbi	Nirmaan	Yes	
2019	Luka Chuppi	"Tu Laung Main Elaachi"	Tulsi Kumar	Kunaal Verma	Yes	
2019	Kesari	"Ve Maahi"	Arijit Singh, Asees Kaur	Tanishk Bagchi	No	
2019	Kesari	"Sanu Kehndi"	Romy, Brijesh Shandilya	Kumaar	No	
2019	De De Pyaar De	"Hauli Hauli"	Garry Sandhu, Neha Kakkar	Tanishk Bagchi, Garry Sandhu, Mellow D	Yes	
2019	Judgementall Hai Kya	"Wakhra Swag"	Navv Inder, Lisa Mishra, Raja Kumari	Tanishk Bagchi, Raja Kumari	Yes	
2019	Khandaani Shafakhana	"Koka"	Jasbir Jassi, Badshah, Dhvani Bhanushali	Tanishk Bagchi, Mellow D, Badshah	Yes	
2019	Khandaani Shafakhana	"Shehar Ki Ladki"	Badshah, Tulsi Kumar	Tanishk Bagchi	Yes	
2019	Jabariya Jodi	"Khadke Glassy"	Yo Yo Honey Singh, Ashok Mastie, Jyotica Tangri	Tanishk Bagchi, Channi Rakhala	Yes	
2019	Jabariya Jodi	"Glassy 2.0"	Yo Yo Honey Singh, Ashok Mastie, Jyotica Tangri	Kumaar	Yes	Along with Ramji Gulati, Ashok Mastie
2019	Jabariya Jodi	"Zilla Hilela" (Remake)	Dev Negi, Monali Thakur, Raja Hassan	Tanishk Bagchi, Shabbir Ahmed	Yes	
2019	Jabariya Jodi	'Dhoonde Akhiyaan'	Yasser Desai, Altamash Faridi	Rashmi Virag	No	
2019	Batla House	"O Saki Saki"	Neha Kakkar, Tulsi Kumar, B Praak	Tanishk Bagchi	Yes	
2019	Mission Mangal	Tota Udd	Raja Hassan, Romi	Tanishk Bagchi	No	
2019	Saaho	"Psycho Saiyaan"	Dhvani Bhanushali, Sachet Tandon	Tanishk Bagchi, MellowD	No	
2019	Pal Pal Dil Ke Paas	Ho Jaa Awawra	Ash King, Monali Thakur	Siddharth-Garima	No	
2019	Drive	"Makhna"	Tanishk Bagchi, Yasser Desai, Asees Kaur	Ozil Dalal, Tanishk Bagchi	No	
2019	Satellite Shankar	"Aari Aari"	Romy, Bombay Rockers	Kumaar	Yes	
2019	Marjaavaan	"Ek Toh Kum Zindagani"	Neha Kakkar	Tanishk Bagchi, A. M. Turaz	Yes	
2019	Marjaavaan	"Thodi Jagah"	Arijit Singh	Rashmi Virag	No	
2019	Marjaavaan	"Thodi Jagah" (Female)	Tulsi Kumar	Rashmi Virag	No	
2019	Marjaavaan	"Haiya Ho"	Tulsi Kumar, Jubin Nautiyal	Tanishk Bagchi	Yes	
2019	Marjaavaan	"Raghupati Raghav Raja Ram"	Palak Mucchal	Manoj Muntashir	Yes	
2019	Pagalpanti	"Tum Par Hum Hai Atke"	Neha Kakkar, Mika Singh	Shabbir Ahmed	Yes	
2019	Pagalpanti	"Bimar Dil"	Jubin Nautiyal, Asees Kaur	Shabbir Ahmed	Yes	
2019	Pati, Patni Aur Woh	"Dheeme Dheeme"	Neha Kakkar, Tony Kakkar	Mellow D, Tony Kakkar	Yes	Along With Tony Kakkar
2019	Pati, Patni Aur Woh	"Ankhiyon Se Goli Maare"	Mika Singh, Tulsi Kumar	Shabbir Ahmed	Yes	
2019	The Body	"Jhalak Dikhlaja Reloaded"	Himesh Reshammiya	Sameer	Yes	
2019	Good Newwz	"Chandigarh Mein"	Badshah, Harrdy Sandhu, Lisa Mishra, Asees Kaur	Tanishk Bagchi	No	Along with Badshah
2019	Good Newwz	"Mana Dil"	B Praak	Rashmi Virag	No	
2019	Good Newwz	"Laal Ghaghra"	Manj Musik, Herbie Sahara, Neha Kakkar	Tanishk Bagchi, Herbie Sahara, Manj Musik	Yes	Along with Herbie Sahara
2019	Good Newwz	"Zumba"	Romy	Vayu	No	
2019	Good Newwz	Good Newwz Theme	Instrumental		No	Along with Kshmr
2020	Jai Mummy Di	"Mummy Nu Pasand"	Sunanda Sharma	Jaani	Yes	
2020	Street Dancer 3D	"Muqabla"	Yash Narvekar, Parampara Thakur	Shabbir Ahmed, Tanishk Bagchi	Yes	
2020	Street Dancer 3D	"Illegal Weapon 2.0"	Jasmine Sandlas, Garry Sandhu	Priya Saraiya Tanishk Bagchi	Yes	
2020	Street Dancer 3D	"Sip Sip 2.0"	Jasmine Sandlas, Garry Sandhu	Garry Sandhu, Kumaar	Yes	
2020	Jawaani Jaaneman	"Ole Ole 2.0"	Amit Mishra	Shabbir Ahmed	Yes	
2020	Shubh Mangal Zyada Saavdhan	"Pyar Tenu Karda Gabru"	Romy	Vayu	Yes	
2020	Shubh Mangal Zyada Saavdhan	"Mere Liye Tum Kaafi Ho"	Ayushmann Khurrana	Vayu	No	Along with Vayu
2020	Shubh Mangal Zyada Saavdhan	"Arrey Pyaar Kar Le"	Ayushmann Khurrana, Bappi Lahiri, Ikka	Vayu, Ikka, Sameer	Yes	
2020	Shubh Mangal Zyada Saavdhan	"Ooh La La"	Sonu Kakkar, Neha Kakkar, Tony Kakkar	Tony Kakkar	No	Along with Tony Kakkar
2020	Shubh Mangal Zyada Saavdhan	"Aisi Taisi"	Mika Singh	Vayu	No	Along with Vayu
2020	Shubh Mangal Zyada Saavdhan	"Raakh"	Arijit Singh	Vayu	No	Along with Vayu
2020	Shubh Mangal Zyada Saavdhan	"Kya Karte The Saajna"	Zahrah S Khan, Anuradha Paudwal	Vayu	Yes	
2020	Baaghi 3	"Bhankas"	Bappi Lahiri, Dev Negi, Jonita Gandhi	Shabbir Ahmed	Yes	
2020	Baaghi 3	"Do You Love Me"	Nikhita Gandhi	Tanishk Bagchi	Yes	
2020	Angrezi Medium	"Nachan Nu Jee Karda"	Romy, Nikhita Gandhi	Tanishk Bagchi	Yes	
2020	Laxmii	"Start Stop"	Raja Hasan	Vayu	No	
2020	Laxmii	"Mata Ka Jagrata"	Farhad Samji		No	
2020	Durgamati	"Baras Baras"	B Praak, Altamash Faridi	Tanishk Bagchi	No	
2020	Unpaused	"Nayi Dhoop"	Zahrah S Khan	Rashmi Virag	No	Anthology film
2020	Unpaused	"Nayi Dhoop (Reprise)"	Zahrah S Khan	Rashmi Virag	No	Anthology film
2020	Coolie No. 1	"Husnn Hai Suhana New"	Abhijeet Bhattacharya, Chandana Dixit	Sameer Anjaan	Yes	Along with Anand Milind
2020	Coolie No. 1	"Mummy Kassam"	Udit Narayan, Monali Thakur, Ikka Singh	Shabbir Ahmed, Ikka Singh	No	Along with Ikka Singh
2020	Coolie No. 1	"Tere Siva"	Ash King, Renessa Das	Rashmi Virag	No	
2021	Koi Jaane Na	"Har Funn Maula"	Vishal Dadlani, Zahrah S Khan	Amitabh Bhattacharya	No	
2021	Hello Charlie	"One Two One Two Dance"	Nakash Aziz	Vayu Shrivastav	No	
2021	Ajeeb Daastaans	"Zindagi (Ittefaq)"	Zahrah S Khan	Tanishk Bagchi	No	Anthology film
2021	Sardar Ka Grandson	"Jee Ni Karda"	Jass Manak, Nikhita Gandhi, Manak-E	Tanishk Bagchi, Manak-E	Yes	Along with Manak-E
2021	Sardar Ka Grandson	"Main Teri Ho Gayi"	Millind Gaba, Pallavi Gaba	Tanishk Bagchi, Millind Gaba	Yes	
2021	Sardar Ka Grandson	"Dil Nahin Todna"	Tanishk Bagchi, Zahrah S Khan	Tanishk Bagchi	No	Debut as a playback singer
2021	Sardar Ka Grandson	"Bandeya"	Divya Kumar	Manoj Muntashir	No	
2021	Sardar Ka Grandson	"Bandeya" (Film Version)	Divya Kumar	Manoj Muntashir	No	
2021	Shershaah	"Raataan Lambiyan"	Jubin Nautiyal, Asees Kaur	Tanishk Bagchi	No	
2021	Bhuj: The Pride of India	"Zaalima Coca Cola"	Shreya Ghoshal	Vayu Shrivastav	Yes	
2021	Bhuj: The Pride of India	"Rammo Rammo"	Udit Narayan, Palak Muchhal, Neeti Mohan	Manoj Muntashir	No	
2021	Bell Bottom	"Dhoom Tara"	Zahrah S Khan	Tanishk Bagchi	No	
2021	Bell Bottom	"Sakhiyan 2.0"	Maninder Buttar, Zahrah S Khan	Tanishk Bagchi, Babbu, Maninder Buttar	Yes	
2021	Helmet	"Doli"	Brijesh Shandilya	Vayu	No	Along with Vayu
2021	Sooryavanshi	"Tip Tip"	Alka Yagnik, Udit Narayan	Anand Bakshi	Yes	Along with Viju Shah
2021	Sooryavanshi	"Aila Re Aila"	Daler Mehndi	Shabbir Ahmed	Yes	Along with Pritam
2021	Sooryavanshi	"Najaa"	Pav Dharia, Nikhita Gandhi	Tanishk Bagchi	Yes	Along with Pav Dharia
2021	Satyameva Jayate 2	"Kusu Kusu"	Zahrah S Khan, Dev Negi	Rashmi Virag, Tanishk Bagchi	No	Inspired From "Muhammad Nabina"
2021	Satyameva Jayate 2	"Tenu Lehanga"	Jass Manak, Zahrah S Khan	Tanishk Bagchi, Jass Manak	Yes	Along with Jass Manak
2021	Chandigarh Kare Aashiqui	"Chandigarh Kare Aashiqui 2.0"	Guru Randhawa, Jassi Sidhu, Zahrah S Khan	Vayu	Yes	
2022	Badhaai Do	"Badhaai Do"	Nakash Aziz, Rajnigandha Shekhawat, Raja Sagoo	Vayu	No	
2022	Bhool Bhulaiyaa 2	"Bhool Bhulaiyaa 2 Title Track"	Neeraj Shridhar, MellowD, Bob	Sameer, Mandy Gill	Yes	Along with Pritam
2022	Jugjugg Jeeyo	"The Punjaabban Song"	Gippy Grewal, Zahrah S Khan, Tanishk Bagchi, Romy	Tanishk Bagchi, Abrar-ul-Haq	Yes	Along with Abrar-ul-Haq
2022	Jugjugg Jeeyo	"Jaise Savan"	Tanishk Bagchi, Zahrah S Khan	Tanishk Bagchi	No	Also as a playback singer
2022	Jugjugg Jeeyo	"Jugjugg Jeeyo - Title Track"	Tanishk Bagchi	Tanishk Bagchi	No	Also as a playback singer
2022	Jugjugg Jeeyo	"Rok Leyy"	Simiran Kaur Dhadli	Dhruv Yogi	No	
2022	Ek Villain Returns	"Naa Tere Bin"	Altamash Faridi	Tanishk Bagchi	No	
2022	Liger	"Mera Banega Tu"	Lakshay Kapoor	Kunaal Vermaa	No	
2022	Liger	"Aafat"	Tanishk Bagchi, Zahrah S Khan	Rashmi Virag	No	Also as a playback singer
2022	Liger	"Manchali"	Zahrah S Khan, Farhad Bhiwandiwala	Farhad Bhiwandiwala	No	
2022	Cuttputlli	"Saathiya"	Nikhil D'Souza, Zahrah S Khan	Tanishk Bagchi	No	
2022	Dhokha: Round D Corner	"Mere Dil Gaaye Ja (Zooby Zooby)"	Zahrah S Khan, Yash Narvekar	Kumaar, Anjaan	Yes	Along with Bappi Lahiri
2022	Dhokha: Round D Corner	"Mahi Mera Dil"	Arijit Singh, Tulsi Kumar	Kumaar	No	
2022	Babli Bouncer	"Mad Banke"	Asees Kaur, Romy	Shabbir Ahmed	No	
2022	Babli Bouncer	"Le Sajna"	Altamash Faridi	Tanishk Bagchi	No	
2022	Thank God	"Manike"	Yohani, Jubin Nautiyal	Rashmi Virag	Yes	Along with Chamath Sangeeth, Dulan ARX & Mellow D
2022	Thank God	"Haaniya Ve"	Jubin Nautiyal	Rashmi Virag	No	
2022	Phone Bhoot	"Kinna Sona"	Zahrah S Khan, Tanishk Bagchi	Tanishk Bagchi	No	
2022	An Action Hero	"Jehda Nasha"	Amar Jalal, IP Singh, Yohani, Harjot Kaur	Tanishk Bagchi, Amar Jalal, Balla Jalal	Yes	Along with Faridkot & Amar Jalal
2022	An Action Hero	"Aap Jaisa Koi"	Zahrah S Khan, Altamash Faridi	Indeevar, Tanishk Bagchi	Yes	Along with Biddu
2022	An Action Hero	"Aap Jaisa Koi" (Film Version)	Zahrah S Khan, Yash Narvekar	Indeevar, Tanishk Bagchi	Yes	Along with Biddu
2022	Govinda Naam Mera	"Bana Sharabi"	Jubin Nautiyal	Tanishk Bagchi	No	
2022	Govinda Naam Mera	"Bana Sharabi - Female"	Neeti Mohan	Tanishk Bagchi	No	
2022	Govinda Naam Mera	"Bana Sharabi - Reprise"	Lakshay Kapoor	Tanishk Bagchi	No	
2022	Govinda Naam Mera	"Bana Sharabi - Instrumental"	Instrumental		No	
2022	Govinda Naam Mera	"Kyaa Baat Haii 2.O"	Harrdy Sandhu, Nikhita Gandhi	Jaani	Yes	Along with B Praak and Kimera
2023	Mission Majnu	"Rabba Janda"	Jubin Nautiyal	Shabbir Ahmed	No	
2023	Mission Majnu	"Rabba Janda - Acoustic"	Jubin Nautiyal	Shabbir Ahmed	No	
2023	Mission Majnu	"Rabba Janda - Female"	Zyra Nargorwala	Shabbir Ahmed	No	
2023	Mission Majnu	"Rabba Janda - Reprise"	Altamash Faridi	Shabbir Ahmed, Tanishk Bagchi	No	
2023	Selfiee	"Main Khiladi"	Udit Narayan, Abhijeet Bhattacharya	Maya Govind, Tanishk Bagchi	Yes	Along with Anu Malik
2023	Selfiee	"Khudiye Ni Teri"	The PropheC, Zahrah S Khan	The PropheC, Tanishk Bagchi	Yes	Along with The PropheC
2023	Selfiee	"Deewaane"	Stebin Ben, Altamash Faridi, Aditya Yadav	Aditya Yadav, Kunaal Verma	Yes	Along with Aditya Yadav
2023	Selfiee	"Selfiee - Aggressive Theme"	Instrumental		No	
2023	Farzi	"Aasman"	Raghav Meattal, Anumita Nadashen	Raghav Mettal	No	Web Series
2023	Gumraah	"Ghar Nahi Jaana"	Armaan Malik, Zahrah S Khan, Salma Agha	Rashmi Virag	No	
2023	Chatrapathi	"Window Taley"	Dev Negi, Jyotica Tangri	Shabbir Ahmed	No	
2023	Chatrapathi	"Bareilly Ke Bazaar"	Sunidhi Chauhan, Dev Negi	Mayur Puri	No	
2023	Chatrapathi	"Gamey Gamey"	Armaan Malik, Zahrah S Khan	Mayur Puri	No	
2023	Chatrapathi	"Shukriya"	Ash King, Palak Muchhal	Mayur Puri	No	
2023	Jogira Sara Ra Ra	"Cocktail"	Nakash Aziz, Nikhita Gandhi	Vayu	No	
2023	Satyaprem Ki Katha	"Le Aaunga"	Arijit Singh	Tanishk-Vayu	No	along with Vayu
2023	Bawaal	"Dilon Ke Doriyan"	Vishal Mishra, Zahrah S Khan, Romy	Arafat Mehmood	No	
2023	Bawaal	"Kat Jayega"	Romy, Pravesh Mallick	Shloke Lal	No	
2023	Dream Girl 2	"Naach"	Nakash Aziz	Shaan Yadav	No	
2023	Fukrey 3	"Ve Fukrey"	Dev Negi, Asees Kaur	Shabbir Ahmed	No	
2023	Fukrey 3	"Macha Re"	Mika Singh, Nakash Aziz	Kumaar	No	
2023	Sajini Shinde Ka Viral Video	"Nana Chi Taang"	Swager Boy, Shreya Jain	Swager Boy, Shloke Lal	No	Along with Swager Boy
2024	Teri Baaton Mein Aisa Uljha Jiya	"Laal Peeli Ankhiyaan"	Tanishk Bagchi, Romy	Neeraj Rajawat	Yes	Hookline Inspired From Rajasthani Folk
2024	Teri Baaton Mein Aisa Uljha Jiya	"Teri Baaton Mein Aisa Uljha Jiya"	Raghav, Asees Kaur, Tanishk Bagchi	Tanishk Bagchi	Yes	Along with Raghav
2024	Crakk	"Dil Jhoom"	Vishal Mishra, Shreya Ghoshal	Gurpreet Saini	Yes	Along with Ali Zafar
2024	Crakk	"Jeena Haraam"	Vishal Mishra, Shilpa Rao	Tanishk Bagchi	No	
2024	Crakk	"Rom Rom"	MC Square, Tanishk Bagchi		Yes	Along with MC Square
2024	Yodha	"Tere Sang Ishq Hua"	Arijit Singh, Neeti Mohan	Kunaal Verma	No	
2024	Yodha	"Tiranga"	B Praak	Manoj Muntashir	No	
2024	Srikanth	"Tu Mil Gaya"	Jubin Nautiyal, Tulsi Kumar	Shloke Lal	No	
2024	Mr. & Mrs. Mahi	"Agar Ho Tum"	Jubin Nautiyal	Kausar Munir	No	
2024	Sarfira	"Saare Ki"	Tanishk Bagchi	Tanishk Bagchi	No	
2024	Sarfira	"De Taali"	Tanishk Bagchi	Shloke Lal	No	
2024	Ghudchadi	"Dil Vasda"	Raghav Chaitanya, Tulsi Kumar	Tanishk Bagchi	No	
2024	Ghudchadi	"Rote Rote"	Jubin Nautiyal	Kumaar	No	
2024	Khel Khel Mein	"Durr Na Karin"	Vishal Mishra, Zahrah S Khan	Kumaar, Khadim Hussain	Yes	Along with Saji Ali
2024	Khel Khel Mein	"Do You Know"	Diljit Dosanjh	Jaani	Yes	Along with B Praak
2024	Do Patti	"Akhiyan De Kol"	Shilpa Rao, MellowD	Kausar Munir, MellowD, Sehrai Gurdas Puri	Yes	Along with Khan Muhammad
2024	The Miranda Brothers	"Pyaar Bhi Jhootha"	B Praak, Yo Yo Honey Singh, R. D. Burman	Majrooh Sultanpuri, Tanishk Bagchi	Yes	Along with R. D. Burman
2024	Bhool Bhulaiyaa 3	"Bhool Bhulaiyaa 3 - TitleTrack"	Neeraj Shridhar, Diljit Dosanjh, Pitbull	Sameer, Dhruv Yogi, Pitbull	Yes	Along with Pritam
2024	Bhool Bhulaiyaa 3	"Hukkush Phukkush"	Sonu Nigam	Som	No	
2025	Sky Force	"Mayee"	B Praak	Manoj Muntashir	No	
2025	Sky Force	"Kya Meri Yaad Aati Hai"	Vishal Mishra	Irshad Kamil	No	
2025	Sky Force	"Tu Hai Toh Main Hoon"	Arijit Singh, Afsana Khan	Irshad Kamil	No	
2025	Sky Force	"Rang"	Satinder Sartaaj, Zahrah S Khan	Shloke Lal	No	
2025	Sky Force	"Aye Mere Watan Ke Logo"	Lata Mangeshkar	Pradeep	Yes	
2025	Loveyapa	"Rehna Kol"	Jubin Nautiyal, Zahrah S Khan, MellowD	Gurpreet Saini, MellowD	No	
2025	Mere Husband Ki Biwi	"Ikk Vari"	Romy	Mudassar Aziz	No	
2025	Mere Husband Ki Biwi	"Channa Tu Bemisal"	Jubin Nautiyal, Bhoomi Trivedi	Mudassar Aziz	No	
2025	Ground Zero	"So Lene De"	Jubin Nautiyal, Afsana Khan	Vayu	No	
2025	Ground Zero	"Lahoo"	Sonu Nigam	Rashmi Virag	No	
2025	Bhool Chuk Maaf	"Koi Na"	Harnoor, Shreya Ghoshal	Irshad Kamil	Yes	Along with Gifty
2025	Bhool Chuk Maaf	"Chor Bazari Phir Se"	Neeraj Shridhar, Sunidhi Chauhan, Zahrah S Khan, Pravesh	Irshad Kamil	Yes	Along with Pritam
2025	Bhool Chuk Maaf	"Sawariya Tera"	Raghav Chaitanya, Varun Jain, Suvarna Tiwari, Pravesh Mallick, Priyanka Sarkaar	Irshad Kamil	No	
2025	Bhool Chuk Maaf	"Ting Ling Sajna"	Madhubanti Bagchi, Tanishk Bagchi	Irshad Kamil	No	
2025	Bhool Chuk Maaf	"Ganga Kinare"	Jubin Nautiyal	Irshad Kamil	No	
2025	Bhool Chuk Maaf	"Allah Meherban"	Divya Kumar	Amitabh Bhattacharya	Yes	Along with Amit Trivedi
2025	Bhool Chuk Maaf	"Hutt Badmaash"	Noor Singh (Chidi), Pravesh Mallick	Shaan Yadav	No	
2025	Bhool Chuk Maaf	"Maahi Mera"	Suvarna Tiwari	Armaan Lahoria	No	
2025	Housefull 5	"The Phoogdi Dance"	Kratex	Kratex, Patya The Doc	No	Along with Kratex
2025	Saiyaara	"Saiyaara (Title Track)"	Faheem Abdullah	Irshad Kamil	No	Along with Faheem Abdullah & Arslan Nizami
2025	Saiyaara	"Saiyaara (Female Version)"	Shreya Ghoshal	Irshad Kamil	No	Along with Faheem Abdullah & Arslan Nizami
2025	Saiyaara	"Vaani Batra"	Faheem Abdullah, Arslan Nizami, John Stewart Eduri	Irshad Kamil	No	Shreya Ghoshal
2025	Saiyaara	"Tu Paas Hai"	Faheem Abdullah, Arslan Nizami, John Stewart Eduri	Irshad Kamil	No	Faheem Abdullah, Arslan Nizami
2025	Saiyaara	"Dimaag Bhool Jaayega, Par Dil Nahin"	Faheem Abdullah, Arslan Nizami, John Stewart Eduri	Irshad Kamil	No	Faheem Abdullah, Arslan Nizami
2025	Saiyaara	"Forever and Ever and Ever"	Faheem Abdullah, Arslan Nizami, John Stewart Eduri	Irshad Kamil	No	Faheem Abdullah, Arslan Nizami
2025	Saiyaara	"Pata Chal Gaya Na!"	Faheem Abdullah, Arslan Nizami, John Stewart Eduri	Irshad Kamil	No	Faheem Abdullah, Arslan Nizami
2025	Saiyaara	"Taaron Mein Ek Tanha Taara"	Faheem Abdullah, Arslan Nizami, John Stewart Eduri	Irshad Kamil	No	
2025	Saiyaara	"Uske Liye Yeh Gaana Banaao"	Faheem Abdullah, Arslan Nizami, John Stewart Eduri	Irshad Kamil	No	
2025	Saiyaara	"I Love You Krish Kapoor!"	Faheem Abdullah, Arslan Nizami, John Stewart Eduri	Irshad Kamil	No	
2025	Saiyaara	"Jaa Yahaan Se!"	Faheem Abdullah, Arslan Nizami, John Stewart Eduri	Irshad Kamil	No	
2025	Saiyaara	"Woh Aayegi, Bhaagte Hue, I Promise"	Faheem Abdullah, Arslan Nizami, John Stewart Eduri	Irshad Kamil	No	
2025	Son of Sardaar 2	"The Po Po Song"	Guru Randhawa	Armaan Sharma, Shabbir Ahmed	Yes	Along with Himesh Reshammiya
2025	Dhadak 2	"Bawariya"	Jubin Nautiyal, Suvarna Tiwari	Ozil Dalal	No	
2025	Tehran	"Ishq Bukhar"	Shreya Ghoshal, B Praak	Irshad Kamil	No	
2025	Tehran	"Yaar Bichhda"	Afsana Khan	Irshad Kamil	No	
2025	Tehran	"Yaar Bichhda (Male Version)"	Ashok Maskin	Irshad Kamil	No	
2025	Tehran	"Tehran - Theme Track"	Instrumental		No	
2025	Baaghi 4	"Yeh Mera Husn"	Shilpa Rao	Sameer Anjaan	No	
2025	Heer Express	"Dore Dore Dil Pe Tere"	Nakash Aziz, Harjot Kaur	Shloke Lal	No	
2025	Heer Express	"I Love My India"	Nikhita Gandhi, Javed Ali	Shloke Lal	No	
2025	Heer Express	"Naa Tere Jaisa Yaar Mileya"	Altamash Faridi, Shreya Jain	Shloke Lal	No	
2025	Sunny Sanskari Ki Tulsi Kumari	"Bijuria"	Sonu Nigam, Asees Kaur	Sonu Nigam, Tanishk Bagchi, Ajay Jhingran	Yes	Along with Ravi Pawar
2025	Sunny Sanskari Ki Tulsi Kumari	"Tumse Behtaar"	Arijit Singh	Manoj Muntashir	No	
2025	Sunny Sanskari Ki Tulsi Kumari	"Sunny Sunny - Boy"	Tanishk Bagchi, Varun Dhawan	Tanishk Bagchi	No	
2026	Pati Patni Aur Woh Do	"Roop Di Rani"	Guru Randhawa, Heer	Indeevar	Yes	Along with Rajesh Roshan
2026	Hai Jawani Toh Ishq Hona Hai	"Wow"	Harrdy Sandhu, Kiran Bajwa	Rony Ajnali, Gill Machhrai	No	Along with Rony Ajnali & Gill Machhrai
2026	The Vvaan: Force of the Forrest	"Samjho Na"	Jubin Nautiyal, Suvarna Tiwari	Manoj Muntashir	No	
2026	The Vvaan: Force of the Forrest	"Thummak Thummak"	Dev Negi, Akasa Singh	Shabbir Ahmed, Tanishk Bagchi	No	
2026	Pehla Pyaar Doosri Baar	"Zulmi"	Heer	Kumaar	No	

=== Telugu film songs ===
Year	Film	Track(s)	Singer(s)	Writer(s)	Notes
2018	Lover	"Adbhutam"	Jubin Nautiyal, Ranjini Jose	Shree Mani	Telugu debut
2019	Saaho	"Psycho Saiyaan"	Anirudh Ravichander, Dhvani Bhanushali	Sreejo	
2020	Street Dancer 3D (dubbed)	"Muqabla"	Yash Narvekar, Parampara Thakur	Ramajogayya Shastry	
2020	Street Dancer 3D (dubbed)	"Illegal Weapon 2.0"	Jasmine Sandlas, Garry Sandhu	Ramajogayya Shastry	
2020	Street Dancer 3D (dubbed)	"Cocktail"	Hanuman, Sri Krishna, Bhargavi Pillai	Ramajogayya Shastry	
2022	Liger	"Aafat"	Simha, Sravana Bhargavi	Bhaskarabhatla	

=== Tamil film songs ===
Year	Film	Track(s)	Singer(s)	Writer(s)	Notes
2019	Saaho	"Kadhal Psycho"	Anirudh Ravichander, Dhvani Bhanushali, Tanishk Bagchi	Madhan Karky	Tamil debut
2020	Street Dancer 3D (dubbed)	"Muqabla Tamil"	Yash Narvekar, Parampara Thakur	Veeramani Kannan	
2020	Street Dancer 3D (dubbed)	"Illegal Weapon 2.0"	Bhargavi Pillai, Saicharan Bhaskaruni	Veeramani Kannan	
2020	Street Dancer 3D (dubbed)	"Unnoda Kangal"	Hanuman, Bharga	Veeramani Kannan	
2022	Liger (dubbed)	"Aafat"	Deepak Blue, Haripriya	Sagar	

=== Other film songs ===
Year	Film	Track(s)	Singer(s)	Writer(s)	Language
2019	Saaho (dubbed)	"Psycho Saiyaan"	Yazin Nizar, Dhvani Bhanushali, Tanishk Bagchi	Vinayak Sasikumar	Malayalam
2022	Liger (dubbed)	"Aafat"	Manzoor Ibrahim, Jyotsna Radhakrishnan	Siju Thuravoor	Malayalam
2022	Liger (dubbed)	"Aafat"	Santhosh Venky, Divya Ramachandra	Varadaraj Chikkaballapura	Kannada

=== Bengali singles ===
Year	Film/Album	Track(s)	Singer(s)	Writer(s)	Notes
2007	City Life	Reeg Dev (Tanishk Bagchi)	All Songs Composed and Sang By Reeg Dev aka Tanishk Bagchi		
2011	Elomelo	"Elomelo"	Tanishk Bagchi	Rana Mazumder	Composed along with Sasha

=== Hindi/Punjabi albums and singles ===
Year	Album(s)/Single(s)	Song	Singer(s)	Lyrics	Cast	Remake	Note
2013	Ungli Pungli	"Paisa Tu Hai Kameeni Cheez"	Tanishk Bagchi	Alaukik Rahi	Tanishk Bagchi	No	
2013	Ungli Pungli-2	"Dil Karela"	Tanishk Bagchi	Tanishk Bagchi	Tanishk Bagchi	No	
2013	Ungli Pungli-2	Jhatka Dil	Tanishk Bagchi	Tanishk Bagchi	Tanishk Bagchi	No	
2013	Ungli Pungli-2	Baap Karey Nautanki	Tanishk Bagchi	Tanishk Bagchi	Tanishk Bagchi	No	
2013	Ungli Pungli-2	Jeena	Tanishk Bagchi	Tanishk Bagchi	Tanishk Bagchi	No	
2018	Leja Re	"Leja Re"	Dhvani Bhanushali	Rashmi Virag	Dhvani Bhanushali, Siddharth, Deepali Negi, Palak Singhal	Yes	
2019	Vaaste	"Vaaste"	Dhvani Bhanushali, Nikhil D'Souza	Arafat Mehmood	Dhvani Bhanushali, Siddharth Gupta, Anuj Saini	No	
2019	Karo Matdaan	"Karo Matdaan"	Shah Rukh Khan, MellowD	Abby Viral, MellowD	Shah Rukh Khan	No	
2019	Chumma	"Chumma"	Guri	K-Rick	Guri	No	
2019	Khud Se Zyada	"Khud Se Zyada"	Tanishk Bagchi, Zahrah S Khan	Tanishk Bagchi	Tanishk Bagchi, Zara Khan	No	
2019	Choodiyan	"Choodiyan"	Asees Kaur, Dev Negi	Shabbir Ahmed	Jackky Bhagnani, Dytto	No	
2019	Nai Jaana	"Nai Jaana"	Tulsi Kumar, Sachet Tandon	Nirmaan	Awez Darbar, Musskan Sethi, Anmol Bhatia	Yes	
2019	Maaserati	"Maaserati"	Tanishk Bagchi, Vayu, Akasa	Vayu	Akasa, Vayu, Shyamsunder Shahane	No	
2019	Yaad Piya Ki Aane Lagi	"Yaad Piya Ki Aane Lagi"	Neha Kakkar	Jaani	Divya Khosla Kumar, Siddharth Nigam, Shivin Narang, Abhimanyu Tomar, Faisu	Yes	
2019	Yaari Ka Circle	"Yaari Ka Circle"	Darshan Raval, Jonita Gandhi	Tanishk Bagchi	Tanishk Bagchi, Darshan Raval, Jonita Gandhi	No	
2020	Na Ja Tu	"Na Ja Tu"	Dhvani Bhanushali, Shashwant Singh	Tanishk Bagchi	Dhvani Bhanushali, Gurjiwan Sekhon	No	
2020	Mere Angne Mein	" Mere Angne Mein"	Neha Kakkar, Raja Hasan	Vayu	Jacqueline Fernandez, Asim Riaz	Yes	
2020	Swag Se Solo	"Swag Se Solo"	Sachet Tandon, Tanishk Bagchi	Vayu	Salman Khan	No	Along with Vayu, Pepsi Advertisement (Original)
2020	Masakali 2.0	"Masakali 2.0"	Sachet Tandon, Tulsi Kumar	Tanishk Bagchi	Siddharth Malhotra, Tara Sutaria	Yes	
2020	Jogan	"Jogan"	Zahrah S Khan, Yaseer Desai	Tanishk Bagchi		No	
2020	Raja Ganpati	"Raja Ganpati"	Asees Kaur, Deedar Kaur, Dev Negi	Rashmi Virag	Asees Kaur, Deedar Kaur, Dev Negi	No	
2020	Naach Meri Rani	"Naach Meri Rani"	Guru Randhawa, Nikhita Gandhi	Tanishk Bagchi	Guru Randhawa, Nora Fatehi	No	
2020	Tu Lagdi Ferrari	"Tu Lagdi Ferrari"	Romy, Asees Kaur	Tanishk Bagchi	Arradhya Maan, Amy Aela	No	
2021	FAU-G Anthem	"FAU-G Anthem"	Romy	Rashmi-Virag		No	
2021	Tera Hoon Na	"Tera Hoon Na"	Nikhil D'Souza	Rashmi-Virag	Avneet Kaur, Arradhya Maan	No	
2021	Lut Gaye	"Lut Gaye"	Jubin Nautiyal	Manoj Muntashir	Emraan Hashmi, Yukti Thareja	Yes	
2021	Solo Laila	"Solo Laila"	Ipsitaa	Vayu Shrivastav	Ipsitaa	No	
2021	Patli Kamariya	"Patli Kamariya"	Tanishk Bagchi, Sukh-E, Parampara Thakur	Tanishk Bagchi	Tanishk Bagchi, Mouni Roy, Sukh-E	No	
2021	Dil Hai Dewaana	"Dil Hai Deewana"	Darshan Raval, Zahrah S Khan	Shabbir Ahmed	Arjun Kapoor, Rakul Preet Singh	Yes	
2021	Dance Meri Rani	"Dance Meri Rani"	Guru Randhawa, Zahrah S Khan	Rashmi Virag	Guru Randhawa, Nora Fatehi	No	
2022	Tera Saath Ho	"Tera Saath Ho"	Guru Randhawa, Zahrah S Khan	Shabbir Ahmed	Zahrah S Khan, Karan Wahi	No	
2022	Mashooka	"Mashooka"	Dev Negi, Asees Kaur	Ullumanati, Yash Narvekar	Rakul Preet Singh	No	
2022	O Sajna	"O Sajna"	Neha Kakkar	Jaani	Priyank Sharma, Dhanashree, Neha Kakkar	Yes	
2022	Main Tenu Chadh Jaungi	"Main Tenu Chadh Jaungi"	Zahrah S Khan	Tanishk Bagchi	Zahrah S Khan, Shaheer Sheikh	No	
2022	Fakeeran	"Fakeeran"	Zahrah S Khan	Tanishk Bagchi	Mouni Roy	No	
2022	Shut Up	"Shut Up"	KiDi, Tulsi Kumar	KiDi, Bhrigu Parashar	KiDi, Tulsi Kumar	Yes	Along with Jack Knight & Soundmalons
2023	Love Stereo Again	"Love Stereo Again"	Tiger Shroff, Zahrah S Khan	Shraddha Pandit	Tiger Shroff, Zahrah S Khan	Yes	Along with Edward Maya
2024	Suhagan	Suhagan	Tanishk Bagchi	Traditional	Swetha Warrier, Subhranil Paul	No	

=== Discography as background score composer ===
Year	Film	Notes
2021	Bell Bottom	

=== Discography as ad jingle composer ===
- Red FMJingle (composed along with Vayu)

== Accolades ==
=== Won ===
2016

- Mirchi Music Award for Critics' Choice Upcoming Music Composer of the Year for "Bolna" from Kapoor & Sons

2017

- Zee Cine Awards Song of the Year for "Baarish" from Half Girlfriend
- International Indian Film Academy Awards for Best Music Director for Badrinath Ki Dulhania along with Amaal Mallik and Akhil Sachdeva

== Reception ==
Bagchi has been panned by critics over the quantity and quality of his remixes.

In 2019, his remake version of the song O Saki Saki achieved a lot of views but was criticised by the original music director, Vishal Dadlani. In 2020, his remake version of the Delhi-6 song Masakali, titled Masakali 2.0, which was initially supposed to be released as part of the soundtrack of Marjaavaan, was severely criticised by the makers of the original, including composer A. R. Rahman, lyricist Prasoon Joshi and singer Mohit Chauhan. He was also trolled on entertainment websites and social media platforms.

After the controversy "Masakali 2.0" Tanishk Bagchi also received criticism through memes that spread on twitter. It also refers to the artist Neha Kakkar, where all the memes are mostly aimed at the two for often making remake songs together. Bagchi had earlier said that he didn't want to make remakes in the beginning, but got an opportunity to make the music for "The Humma Song" for Ok Jaanu. Bagchi also received harsh criticism because of the song Zaalima Coca Cola which was sung by Shreya Ghoshal and starred Nora Fatehi. The song was originally released for the action film, Bhuj: The Pride of India. The song was criticised by Pakistani netizens because the film is considered anti-Pakistan, while the original version of this song is a song from Pakistan sung by Noor Jehan. The song also drew criticism for the lyrics used, but others praised the performance of Ghoshal and Fatehi for this song.
