= Aurangzeb (film) =

2013 Indian film by Atul Sabharwal

- Theatrical release poster
- Directed by: Atul Sabharwal
- Written by: Atul Sabharwal
- Produced by: Aditya Chopra
- Starring: Prithviraj Sukumaran; Arjun Kapoor; Rishi Kapoor; Jackie Shroff; Amrita Singh
- Cinematography: Karthik Ganesh
- Edited by: Niraj Voralia
- Music by: Songs: Amartya Rahut; Vipin Mishra; Score: Vipin Mishra
- Production company: Yash Raj Films
- Distributed by: Yash Raj Films
- Release date: 17 May 2013
- Running time: 137 minutes
- Country: India
- Language: Hindi
- Box office: est. ₹35.41 crore

Aurangzeb is a 2013 Indian Hindi-language action thriller film written and directed by Atul Sabharwal in his directorial debut, and produced by Aditya Chopra under Yash Raj Films. The film stars Prithviraj Sukumaran, Arjun Kapoor, Rishi Kapoor and Jackie Shroff with Amrita Singh, Tanvi Azmi, Sikandar Kher, Zahrah S. Khan, and Swara Bhasker in supporting roles. Set in Gurgaon, the narrative follows the doppelganger of a criminal's son going undercover to expose a criminal syndicate.

The film was released on 17 May 2013, and received mixed reviews from critics.

== Plot ==
In Gurgaon, Inspector Vijaykant Phogat fails a mission to eliminate notorious businessman Yashvardhan Singh, leading to his retirement. Years later, his son, ACP Arya Phogat, uncovers his father's secret—Vijaykant had another wife and child, and the child, Vishal, is an identical twin to Yashwardhan's son, Ajay. Vijaykant's younger brother Ravikant is the morally corrupt counterpart to his nephew.

Arya and Ravikant devise a plan to expose Yashvardhan's illegal activities by using Vishal to pose as Ajay within the Singh household. Meanwhile, Vishal begins to bond with Yashvardhan while pretending to be Ajay, who then discovers his real identity. As the plot thickens, Ravikant's ulterior motives of taking over Yashvardhan's business empire are revealed, leading to a series of betrayals, manipulations, and violent confrontations.

Ultimately, Ravikant kills Vishnu, an honest family member who poses a threat to him, and pressures Arya to kill Yashvardhan's family. However, Arya realizes his uncle's corrupt nature and, together with Vishal, works to thwart Ravikant's plans. In the final showdown, Vishal kills Ravikant after saving Arya, and justice is served. Ajay is jailed, but eventually reunites with his family once released. The story ends with Arya leaving Veera's home, ensuring the reuniting of the family while reflecting on the deep-rooted corruption in the system.

== Cast ==
- Prithviraj Sukumaran as ACP Arya Phogat, Vijaykant's son; Ajay and Vishal's half-brother
- Arjun Kapoor in a dual role as Ajay / Vishal Singh, Arya's half brother
- Rishi Kapoor as DCP Ravikant Phogat, Arya's Uncle
- Jackie Shroff as Yashvardhan Singh, Ajay and Vishal's father
- Amrita Singh as Neena Wadhwa, Yashvardhan's business partner
- Deepti Naval as Rama Phogat, Ravikant's wife
- Tanvi Azmi as Veer Singh, Ajay and Vishal's mother
- Swara Bhasker as Suman Phogat, Arya's wife
- Zahrah S. Khan as Ritu, Ajay's girlfriend
- Sikander Kher as Inspector Dev Phogat, Ravikant's son
- Sumeet Vyas as Sub-Inspector Vishnu Sharma, Ravikant's son-in-law
- Rasika Dugal as Trishla "Chhoti" Phogat
- Kavi Shastri as Inder Wadhwa, Neena's son
- Anupam Kher as Inspector Vijaykant Phogat, Arya's father and Ravikant's brother (cameo appearance)

== Themes ==
According to Arjun Kapoor, Aurangzeb is "about hunger for power and survival of the fittest." The film's title is a reference to the Mughal emperor of the same name, who expanded the empire to its greatest extent.

== Soundtrack ==
The film's soundtrack was composed by Vipin Mishra and Amartya Rahut.

Aurangzeb

Soundtrack album by Amartya Rahut, Vipin Mishra
- Released: 13 May 2013
- Genre: Film soundtrack
- Length: 29:58
- Label: YRF Music
- Producer: Aditya Chopra

No.	Title	Lyrics	Music	Singer(s)	Length
1.	"Barbaadiyan"	Puneet Sharma	Amartya Rahut	Ram Sampath, Sasha Agha	4:16
2.	"Jigra Fakira"	Manoj Kumar Nath	Vipin Mishra	Keerthi Sagathia	3:41
3.	"Barbaadi"	Puneet Sharma	Amartya Rahut	K. Mohan	4:32
4.	"Aurangzeb"	Vipin Mishra	Vipin Mishra	Marianne D'Cruz	3:11
5.	"Aurangzeb - Rock Version"	Vipin Mishra	Vipin Mishra	Vipin Mishra	3:53
6.	"Trial By Fire – Main Theme"	–	Vipin Mishra	Instrumental	2:31
7.	"Battleground Gurgaon"	–	Vipin Mishra	Instrumental	3:03
8.	"The Father's Truth"	–	Vipin Mishra	Instrumental	3:27
9.	"Aurangzeb – Orchestral"	–	Vipin Mishra	Instrumental	1:13

== Reception ==
=== Critical response ===
The film received mixed reviews from critics. On the review aggregator website Rotten Tomatoes, 40% of 5 critics' reviews are positive, with an average rating of 4/10.

Meena Iyer of The Times of India gave the film 3.5 out of 5 stars, praising the performances of Rishi Kapoor, Prithviraj Sukumaran, and Jackie Shroff. Sukanya Verma of Rediff.com gave the film 3 out of 5 stars, writing that the performances of Prithviraj Sukumaran, Rishi Kapoor and Arjun Kapoor are the best thing about Aurangzeb. Taran Adarsh of Bollywood Hungama gave the film 2 out of 5 stars, writing "On the whole, Aurangzeb has a great premise, but great plots don't generally translate into great films. This one's way too lengthy and mediocre to leave any kind of impression whatsoever. Disappointing!". Mohar Basu of Koimoi gave the film 2.5 out of 5 stars, praising the script and performances, but criticised the length and poor editing. Ravina Rawal of Firstpost wrote "Aurangzeb is a story of potentially epic proportions but its struggle to be coherent and its final conclusion is unable to match the build-up and premise".

=== Box office ===
The film collected ₹18.5 crore domestically, and was declared as a flop by Box Office India.
