= Uttarayan (2004 film) =

- Directed by: Bipin Nadkarni
- Written by: Jaywant Dalvi
- Screenplay by: Bipin Nadkarni
- Produced by: Bipin Nadkarni; Sanjay Shetty
- Starring: Shivaji Satam; Neena Kulkarni; Gauri Nigudkar; Sharad Kelkar; Uttara Baokar; Viju Khote
- Cinematography: Mahesh Limaye
- Edited by: Vishal Kharat
- Music by: Amartya Bobo Rahut
- Release date: 2004
- Country: India
- Language: Marathi

Uttarayan is a Marathi film directed by Bipin Nadkarni in his directorial debut, starring Shivaji Satam and Neena Kulkarni in lead roles. It has won the National Film Award for Best Feature Film in Marathi. The plot of the film is based on the Marathi play "Durgi" written by Jaywant Dalvi.

== Plot ==
Raghuvir Rajadhyaksha (Raghu) moves to Mumbai after his retirement to live with his son Sanjay, who is now getting married and has future plans of going to USA. Raghu, a widower for the past 14 years meets Kusumawati, his teenage crush. Kusumawati is now known as Durgi, as she was named that after her marriage with a rich barrister from Pune. Durgi's marriage fails as she is abused & harassed. Her father dies of a heart attack and her brother sells off all the property and leaves with his wife to live separately. Durgi is thus left alone to aid her ailing old mother. Raghu, being all alone and finding Durgi also to be same, falls in love with her again and decides to get married. But he has to face opposition from his son and his wife's sister.

== Cast ==
- Shivaji Satham as Raghuvir Rajadhyaksha / Raghu
- Neena Kulkarni as Kusumawati / Durgi
- Uttara Baokar as Mai (Kusumawati's mother)
- Viju Khote as Babu Borkar
- Akshay Pendse as Sanjay (Raghu's son)
- Sharad Kelkar as Young Raghu
- Gauri Nigudkar as Young Kusumawati
- Suhita Thatte as (Raghu's wife's sister)
- Priya Khopkar as Sanjay's wife

== Music ==
The songs of the film are written by Kaustubh Savarkar and the music is composed by Amartya Bobo Rahut.

No.	Title	Singer(s)	Length
1.	"Dhund Hote Shabda Saare"	Ravindra Bijur	03:33
2.	"Raan He Uthle Uthle"	Ravindra Sathe	02:46

== Awards ==
=== National Film Awards ===
- Won: National Film Award for Best Feature Film in Marathi

=== Maharashtra State Film Awards ===
- Won:Maharashtra State Film Award for Best Film

=== Alpha Gaurav Awards ===
- The film won 12 nominations and received 7 awards.
