= Vishal Gondal =

Indian businessman

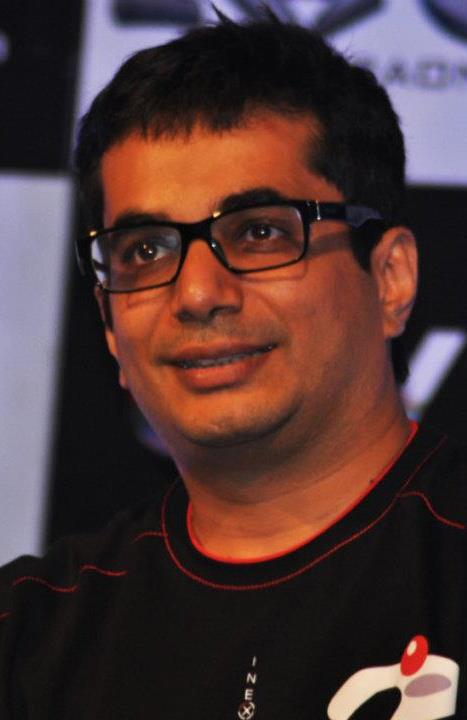
- Vishal Gondal at Ra.One Press Conference in October 2011
- Born: 14 July 1976 (age 50); Mumbai, India
- Education: Mumbai University
- Occupations: Entrepreneur; Venture Capitalist
- Title: CEO GOQii, Ex CEO Indiagames

Vishal Gondal (Hindi: विशाल गोंडल) (born 14 July 1976) is an Indian entrepreneur and angel investor. He is the founder and CEO of GOQii (pronounced Go-Key).

Gondal founded the game development and publishing company Indiagames, which he sold to DisneyUTV Digital, a subsidiary of The Walt Disney Company India, in 2011. He briefly served as the Managing Director of Digital division of The Walt Disney Company India from September 2012 to June 2013.

On 4 September 2020, Bollywood superstar Akshay Kumar announced the planned release of FAU-G, a game developed by Bengaluru-headquartered nCORE Games, under Vishal Gondal, which is released on 26 January 2021.

== History ==
=== Indiagames ===
In 1999, Gondal founded Indiagames, a video game development and publishing company. By 2009 the company had approximately 300 employees and offices in Mumbai, Beijing, London and Los Angeles. Gondal sold a majority stake (76.29% of the company) to TOM online Games, a subsidiary of TOM Online Inc, in 2009 and retained his position as CEO. At the time of acquisition, Indiagames was making an approximate profit of $400,000 on revenues of $11 million.

=== Other activities ===
In 2008, Gondal launched Sweat and Blood Venture group to invest in startups at a seed level. The organization has invested in Instablogs and Docsuggest, among others.

In August 2012, The Walt Disney Company India Pvt. Ltd. restructured its digital assets under a new division, DisneyUTV Digital, with Vishal Gondal as its managing director.

In March 2014, Gondal launched GOQii, a fitness technology company based in Menlo Park, California.

Gondal has presented at the INK Conferences in Mumbai.

== Awards ==
- In 2001, Top 40 Indian Entrepreneurs by Business Today.
- In 2005, Mobile Entertainment magazine listed Gondal as listed as one of the top 50 executives in the mobile content space.
- In 2005, Indiagames was listed by Red Herring among Asia's Top 100 companies.
- In 2012, techcircle.in included Gondal in a list of the top 25 powerful people in Indian digital business.
- In 2019, "Entrepreneur Magazine" awarded Gondal Entrepreneur of the Year Award.

== See also ==
- List of Indian entrepreneurs
