= Jai Mummy Di =

2020 Indian film by Navjot Gulati

- Theatrical release poster
- Directed by: Navjot Gulati
- Written by: Navjot Gulati
- Produced by: Bhushan Kumar; Krishan Kumar; Luv Ranjan
- Starring: Sunny Singh; Sonnalli Seygall; Supriya Pathak; Poonam Dhillon
- Cinematography: Sanket Shah
- Edited by: Dev Rao Jadhav; Chetan M. Solanki
- Music by: Score: Hitesh Sonik; Songs: Amartya Bobo Rahut; Tanishk Bagchi; Meet Bros; Parag Chhabra; Rishi-Siddhant; Gaurav Chatterji
- Production companies: T-Series; Luv Films
- Distributed by: Yash Raj Films
- Release date: 17 January 2020
- Running time: 103 minutes
- Country: India
- Language: Hindi

Jai Mummy Di (transl. All Hail the Mother!) is a 2020 Indian Hindi-language romantic comedy film written and directed by debutant Navjot Gulati starring Sunny Singh and Sonnalli Seygall. The film also features actors Supriya Pathak and Poonam Dhillon. It was produced by Luv Films and distributed by T-Series. The film tells the story of conflicting dynamics between mothers of protagonists and how that is affecting them and other members of both the families. The film was theatrically released in India on 17 January 2020.

The film brings Singh and Seygall back together on-screen after Pyaar Ka Punchnama 2.

== Plot ==
Lovestruck rivals Puneet Khanna and Saanjh Bhalla decide to take their relationship to the next level and get married. However, they hit a bumpy road when they learn that their mothers are sworn foes.

== Cast ==
- Sunny Singh as Puneet "Punnu" Khanna
- Sonnalli Seygall as Saanjh Bhalla
- Supriya Pathak as Laali Khanna
- Poonam Dhillon as Pinky Bhalla
- Shiwani Saini as Shruti Sethi
- Bhuvan Arora as Dev Baluja, Saanjh's fiancé
- Rajendra Sethi as Trilochan Khanna
- Danish Husain as Gurpal Bhalla
- Veer Rajwant Singh as Vineet Khanna, Puneet's younger brother
- Alok Nath as Sanjog Luthra (Sanju Ji)
- Neeraj Sood as Jasbir Bhullar
- Sharat Saxena as Pinky's father
- Sukhwinder Chahal as Jagat Mama
- Sandeep D Bose as Shammi Mama
- vasundhara Kaul as Sakshi Bhatia
- Tina Bhatia as Teri
- Himika Bose as Ashleen
- Amardeep Jha as Shruti's mother

=== Special appearances ===
- Nushrratt Bharuccha as Young Laali Khanna
- Ishita Raj Sharma as Young Pinky Bhalla
- Varun Sharma as Young Sanjog Luthra
- Neha Kakkar in song "Lamborghini"
- Jassi Gill in song "Lamborghini"

== Production ==
The film has been shot in many locations of which one being Raj Nagar, Ghaziabad Sector 7.

=== Soundtrack ===
Jai Mummy Di

Soundtrack album by Amartya Bobo Rahut, Tanishk Bagchi, Meet Bros, Parag Chhabra, Rishi-Siddhant and Gaurav Chatterji
- Released: 14 January 2020
- Recorded: 2018–2019
- Genre: Feature film soundtrack
- Length: 25:37
- Language: Hindi
- Label: T-Series
External audio
- Official Audio Jukebox on YouTube

The film's music was composed by Amartya Bobo Rahut, Tanishk Bagchi, Meet Bros, Parag Chhabra, Rishi-Siddhant and Gaurav Chatterji with lyrics written by Kumaar, Shellee, Siddharth Kaushal, Jaani, Ginny Diwan, Gautam G. Sharma and Gurpreet Saini.

The song Mummy Nu Pasand is a remake of the 2017 hit Punjabi single Jaani Teri Naa, originally produced by Sukh-E Musical Doctorz, which was recreated for the film by Tanishk Bagchi.

The song Lamborghini is a rehash of the 2018 Punjabi song Lamberghini, written and composed by The Doorbeen, and featuring Ragini Tandan, which is in turn based on a traditional folk song Chitta Kukkad.

Track listing
No.	Title	Lyrics	Music	Singer(s)	Length
1.	"Mummy Nu Pasand"	Jaani	Tanishk Bagchi	Sunanda Sharma	3:04
2.	"Lamborghini"	Kumaar	Meet Bros	Neha Kakkar, Jassi Gill	4:06
3.	"Dariyaganj"	Siddharth Kaushal	Amartya Bobo Rahut	Arijit Singh, Dhvani Bhanushali	3:31
4.	"Ishq Da Band"	Ginny Dhawan	Gaurav Chatterji	Shipla Surroch, Mika Singh, Harjot Dhillon	3:00
5.	"Jai Mummy Di – Title Track"	Shellee	Parag Chhabra	Nikhita Gandhi, Parag Chhabra, Vivek Hariharan, Devender Pal Singh	2:53
6.	"Manney Ignore Kar Rahi"	Siddharth Kaushal	Amartya Bobo Rahut	Amitabh Bhattacharya	2:46
7.	"Ajaa Ajaa"	Gautam G. Sharma, Gurpreet Saini	Rishi-Siddharth	Divya Kumar	2:46
8.	"Dariyaganj" (version 2)	Siddhant Kaushal	Amartya Bobo Rahut	Dhvani Bhanushali	3:31
Total length:					25:37

== Release ==
The film was released on 17 January 2020.

On the review aggregator website Rotten Tomatoes, 0% of 5 critics' reviews are positive, with an average rating of 2/10.
