= Tushar Joshi =

Indian musician

- Born: 3 August 1987 (age 39); Jabalpur, Madhya Pradesh, India
- Education: Kendriya Vidyalaya Sangathan SAE Institute
- Occupations: Playback singer; songwriter; composer; music producer
- Years active: 2009–present

Tushar Joshi (born 3 August 1987, Jabalpur) is an Indian singer, songwriter, and music producer. He has recorded songs predominantly in the Hindi, South and Bangla music industry, but also in the Marathi, Telugu, and Gujarati languages.

Joshi's career began with lending his voice to the musicals featuring Ranbir Kapoor in the film 'Jagga Jasoos,' with his debut film song "Musafir" being from the same movie, released in 2017.

He has 2 million monthly listeners on Spotify. Tushar Joshi has sung Bhool Bhulaiyaa 2's "Ami Je Tomar Tandav" (Film version), "Woh Din" (film version) from Chhichhore, Kalank's "Aira Gaira", Jab Harry Met Sejal's "Phurrr" and many more.

== Early life ==
Tushar Joshi was born on 3 August 1987 in Jabalpur. He earned a Visharad degree in classical music from Bhatkhande Sangeet Mahavidyalaya Jabalpur. Along with Indian classical music, he also developed an interest in Western forms of music.

== Career ==
He began his career as a scratch vocalist. After moving to Mumbai in 2009, he studied at the School of Audio Engineering and worked as an assistant to Pritam.

Before working with Pritam, Tushar collaborated with Vishal-Shekhar. He later started his own YouTube channel as a hobby. His first independent song, "Baatein Adhoori," was released on YouTube in 2021. His journey began in 2009 as a freelance musician, working on promos, jingles, and voiceovers.

He sang "Oh Maahi" (sad version) for the movie Dunki and collaborated in live shows with Coke Studio Bharat in and around Delhi. Tushar, along with Antara Mitra, sang the title track for the television show Shubhaarambh on Colors TV. Additionally, he and Antara Mitra sang the Bengali song "Toke Niye Jabo," composed by Indraadip Das Gupta with lyrics by Pralay Sarkar.

== Discography ==
Year	Film	Song	Composer(s)	Lyrics	Co-singer(s)	Notes
2017	Jagga Jasoos	"Musafir"	Pritam	Amitabh Bhattacharya		Also sang for the extended album
2017	Jagga Jasoos	"Khaana Khaake"	Pritam	Amitabh Bhattacharya	Pritam, Amitabh Bhattacharya, June Banerjee, Antara Mitra, Sunny M. R. and many more	Also sang for the extended album
2017	Tubelight	"Naach Meri Jaan"	Pritam	Amitabh Bhattacharya	Nakash Aziz	
2017	Jab Harry Met Sejal	"Phurrr"	Pritam, Diplo	Irshad Kamil	Mohit Chauhan, Diplo	
2017	Jab Harry Met Sejal	"Phurrr" (Film Version)	Pritam, Diplo	Irshad Kamil	Mohit Chauhan	
2018	Race 3	"Allah Duhai Hai"	JAM8	Shabbir Ahmed, Shloke Lal, Rap lyrics: Raja Kumari	Sreerama Chandra, Amit Mishra, Jonita Gandhi, Raja Kumari (rap)	Composed with Vikas for JAM8
2019	Chhichhore	"Woh Din" (Film Version)	Pritam	Amitabh Bhattacharya		
2019	Kalank	"Kalank - Title Track" (Film Version)	Pritam	Amitabh Bhattacharya	Shilpa Rao	
2019	Kalank	"Aira Gaira"	Pritam	Amitabh Bhattacharya	Javed Ali, Antara Mitra	
2019	Kalank	"Aira Gaira" (Extended)	Pritam	Amitabh Bhattacharya	Javed Ali, Antara Mitra	
2020	Darbaan	"Dil Bandar"	Amartya Bobo Rahut	Siddhant Kaushal		Zee5 film
2020	Bhangra Paa Le	"Raanjhan"	JAM8	Mandy Gill	Neeti Mohan	
2021	83	"Utth Ja Ziddi Re"	Pritam	Prashant Ingole		
2022	Janhit Mein Jaari	"Ishq Ho Jaane De"	Sadhu Sushil Tiwari	Rohit Sharma		
2022	Bhool Bhulaiyaa 2	"Ami Je Tomar Tandav" (Film Version)	Pritam	Sameer		
2022	Brahmastra: Part One - Shiva	"Rasiya"	Pritam	Amitabh Bhattacharya	Shreya Ghoshal	
2022	Laal Singh Chaddha	"Tere Hawale" (Reprise)	Pritam	Amitabh Bhattacharya	Shilpa Rao	Extended Album
2023	Rocky aur Rani ki Prem Kahani	"Ve Kamleya" (Redux)	Pritam	Amitabh Bhattacharya	Shreya Ghoshal	
2023	Dunki	"O Maahi" (Sad Version)	Pritam	Irshad Kamil		
2024	Merry Christmas	"Raat Akeli Thi" (Version 2)	Pritam	Varun Grover	Shilpa Rao	
2024	Do Aur Do Pyaar	"Jaaney Do"	Shubhajit Mukherjee	Azazul Haque		
2025	Nadaaniyan	"Galatfehmi"	Sachin-Jigar	Amitabh Bhattacharya	Madhubanti Bagchi	Netflix film
2026	Do Deewane Seher Mein	"Tera Mera Saath"	White Noise Collectives	Priya Saraiya	Sumedha Karmahe	

== Television and web series ==
Year	Title	Song	Note
2019	Shubharambh	Title Track	on Colors TV
2020	The Forgotten Army - Azaadi Ke Liye	2 songs	
