= Darbaan =

Indian drama film based on short story

- Release poster
- Directed by: Bipin Nadkarni
- Written by: Bipin Nadkarni; Rakesh Jadhav
- Based on: Short story by Rabindra Nath Tagore
- Produced by: Bipin Nadkarni; Yogesh Beldar
- Starring: Sharib Hashmi; Sharad Kelkar; Rasika Dugal; Flora Saini
- Narrated by: Annu Kapoor
- Cinematography: Amalendu Chaudhary
- Edited by: Jayant Jathar; Vandita Chakradeo
- Music by: Songs: Amartya Bobo Rahut; Raajeev V. Bhalla; Score: Rohhan Patel
- Production company: Opticus Picture Company
- Distributed by: ZEE5
- Release date: 4 December 2020
- Running time: 145 minutes
- Country: India
- Language: Hindi

Darbaan (Guard) is a 2020 Indian Hindi drama film directed and produced by Bipin Nadkarni under the banner of Opticus Picture Company with Yogesh Beldar as co-producer. This marks the debut of the director in Bollywood cinema. The film stars Sharib Hashmi, Sharad Kelkar, Rasika Dugal and Flora Saini.

The film was to be theatrically released on 3 April 2020, but postponed later due to COVID. It premiered on ZEE5 on 4 December 2020.

== Premise ==
Darbaan is an adaption of a 1918 short story Khokababur Pratyabartan written by Nobel Prize winner Rabindra Nath Tagore. The screenplay is about the friendship between a boy and his caretaker who come from different steps on the social and economic ladder.

== Cast ==
- Sharib Hashmi as Raicharan (Raichu) a.k.a. Channa
- Sharad Kelkar as Anukul Tripathi (Anu)
- Rasika Dugal as Bhuri, Raicharan's wife
- Flora Saini as Charul Tripathi, Anukul's wife
- Harsh Chhaya as Naren Tripathi, Anukul's father
- Suneeta Sengupta as Sushma Tripathi, Anukul's mother
- Mukesh Ramani as Shiv Dayal, Anukul's driver
- Varun Sharma as Siddhanth Tripathi a.k.a. Siddhu, Raicharan's adopted son; Anukul's biological son (Cameo)
- Annu Kapoor as Narrator
- Dilavar makrani as Police Officer

== Soundtrack ==
Darbaan

Soundtrack album by Amartya Bobo Rahut and Raajeev V. Bhalla
- Released: 23 November 2020
- Recorded: 2019
- Genre: Feature film soundtrack
- Length: 14:08
- Language: Hindi
- Label: Zee Music Company

Official audio
- Darbaan - Full Album on YouTube

The soundtrack of the film is composed by Amartya Bobo Rahut and Raajeev V. Bhalla whereas lyrics are written by Manoj Yadav, Siddhant Kaushal and Akshay K. Saxena.

Track listing
No.	Title	Lyrics	Singer(s)	Length
1.	"Khushmizaaj"	Manoj Yadav	Arijit Singh, Amartya Bobo Rahut	3:50
2.	"Rang Bhariya"	Siddhant Kaushal	Gujraj Singh, Amrita Singh, Amartya Bobo Rahut	4:24
3.	"Dil Bandar"	Siddhant Kaushal	Tushar Joshi, Amartya Bobo Rahut	2:12
4.	"Behti Si" (Music by Raajeev V. Bhalla)	Akshay K. Saxena	Raajeev V. Bhalla, Rashi Harmalkar	3:42
Total length:				14:08

== Reception ==
Anna M. M. Vetticad of Firstpost found the film 'bitter-sweet'. She praised the acting of Hashmi, Dugal and supporting cast and music of Amartya Bobo Rahut. She criticised the screenplay of Nadkarni co-written with Rakesh Jadhav for robbing the narrative of the film with 'substance and considerable sociological commentary'. Praising cinematographer Amalendu Chaudhary for 'striking shots across several locations', she rated it with two and half stars out of five. Vetticad concluded, "Darbaan is nice enough, but it lacks depth and width." Pradeep Kumar reviewing for The Hindu called it "simplistic take on servitude that feels out of place". Agreeing with Vetticad, Kumar also criticised the screenplay because he felt, "...story remains under explored". He also found the soundtrack "endearing". He concluded, "However, beyond his [Hashmi's] classy performance, Darbaan seems like a script better suited to the stage than the canvas of a cinema.".
