= Tu Hai Mera Sunday =

2016 Indian film written and directed by Mihind Dhaimade

- Film poster
- Directed by: Milind Dhaimade
- Written by: Milind Dhaimade
- Produced by: Varun Shah
- Starring: Barun Sobti; Shahana Goswami; Vishal Malhotra; Avinash Tiwary; Rasika Dugal; Maanvi Gagroo; Nakul Bhalla; Jay Upadhyay; Shiv Kumar Subramaniam
- Cinematography: Harendra Singh
- Edited by: Shyam Salgoankar
- Music by: Amartya Bobo Rahut
- Release date: 6 October 2016 (Cannes)
- Running time: 1:59:00
- Country: India
- Language: Hindi

Tu Hai Mera Sunday (transl. You are my Sunday) is a 2016 Indian Hindi slice of life film directed by Milind Dhaimade starring Barun Sobti, Shahana Goswami, Avinash Tiwary, Vishal Malhotra, Rasika Dugal, and Shiv Kumar Subramaniam. It is the story of a group of five friends in the noisy, crowded city of Mumbai, and what follows when their Sunday football game on the beach is canceled. The music was composed by Amartya Bobo Rahut.

== Cast ==
- Barun Sobti as Arjun Anand
- Shahana Goswami as Kavya Ranganathan
- Avinash Tiwary as Rashid Sheikh
- Vishal Malhotra as Dominic "Domi" Almeida
- Rasika Dugal as Tasneem Lakdhawala
- Maanvi Gagroo as Vinta
- Nakul Bhalla as Mehernosh "Bawa"
- Jay Upadhyay as Jayesh Garodia
- Shiv Kumar Subramaniam as G. B. Ranganathan "Appa", Kavya's father
- Rama Joshi as Wilma, Dominic's mother
- Meher Acharia-Dar as Shruti
- Suhaas Ahuja as Dennis Almeida, Dominic's brother
- Pallavi Batra as Peppy
- Krishna Singh Bisht as Gokul
- Mahnaz Damania as Rashid's girlfriend
- Sandiip Sikcand as Dr. Prashant

== Plot ==
The movie revolves around five friends who are looking for some free space in a busy city like Mumbai to play football, a game that helps them to escape the harsh realities of their own lives.

== Soundtrack ==
The soundtrack was composed by Amartya Bobo Rahut and was released on Zee Music Company label. All the lyrics have been written by Milind Dhaimade, who is also the film's director.

Tracklist
No.	Title	Artist(s)	Length
1.	"Thodi Si Jagah"	Arijit Singh	4:32
2.	"Dhoondlo"	Arijit Singh	4:32
3.	"Yeh Mera Mann"	Ash King	3:54
4.	"Tu Hai Mera Sunday"	Shalmali Kholgade	3:40
5.	"Yeh Jo Pyaar Hai"	Nandini Srikar	3:38
Total length:			20:26

== Reception ==
The Indian Express praised the film, remarking, "Dhaimade is clearly skilled at creating life-like characters who feel as if they are people you could know, tics and all. ‘Tu Hai Mera Sunday’ is a feel-good, light-hearted yarn. And it comes at a time when that precious, vanishing space—middle-of-the-road and realistic, not too shiny or too drab but just right—needs an urgent refill. I guarantee you will leave smiling."

NDTV.com reviewed, "Milind Dhaimade's Tu Hai Mera Sunday is a film so nice it borders on the naive. It is ostensibly about the lack of space to play in a city too busy to stop being busy, but it is about so much more. It is about the city itself, Bombay, and its bizarre, beautiful inhabitants, the impossible people who hold this precarious place together with dreams and duct-tape. It is about the need to stop to smell the roses and the intent to walk away from that which does not make you happy. It is about friendship, and love, and the importance of an occasional outburst. This is, sweetly and surely, a film that cares."

Scroll.in wrote, "Despite tackling heavyweight themes, Tu Hai Mera Sunday has none of the angst associated with the Mumbai movie – the narrative is less pressure cooker than a gently simmering pot."

Film Companion wrote, "Starring Barun Sobti and Shahana Goswami, this film about the lack of space in Mumbai is elevated into a profound zone thanks to director Milind Dhaimade's understanding of fragile middle-class dynamics"

Hindustan Times gave it 3/5 stars and reviewed, "However, Tu Hai Mera Sunday tries to talk about many issues in 126 minutes. The heated arguments sometimes look forced. The firm grips on the audience slacks somewhere in the second half. But thanks to his actors, director Milind Dhaimade manages to sail through these scenes and still conveys a very positive vibe about Tu Hai Mera Sunday."
