= Gauri Nigudkar =

Indian actress

- Born: Mumbai, Maharashtra
- Occupations: Film actress; Television actress
- Years active: 2004–present
- Spouse: Hrishikesh Kunte (2013–present)
- Parents: Sudhir Nigudkar (father); Manik Nigudkar (mother)
- Website: https://bitesandbokeh.com/

Gauri Nigudkar is an Indian actress and reality-show anchor. She made her movie debut with the 2004 film Uttarayan, which won the National Film Award for Best Feature Film in Marathi. Nigudkar played the lead roles in the soap operas Betiyaan Apni Yaa Paraaya Dhan on Star Plus, Mere Apne on 9X (TV) and Waaris on Zee TV. She has acted in many TV commercials.

Youtube Channel Link - www.youtube.com/@everythingWOW.

== Personal life ==
Gauri's father is a pharmacist and her mother is a chemistry professor. Gauri has done her post-graduation in organic chemistry at the University of Mumbai and maintains a chemistry-related blog. She is married to Hrishikesh Kunte.

== Career ==
Nigudkar started her career in 2004 with the national award-winning film Uttarayan. The film is based on the Marathi play "Durgi" by Jaywant Dalvi. She made her television debut in the 2007 series Betiyaan Apni Yaa Paraaya Dhan alongside Gautam Rode on Star Plus. She played the lead role of Krishna, the eldest daughter and central character of the show. She played leading roles in the Mere Apne show on 9X (TV) where she played the daughter of Vinod Khanna and Smriti Irani and Waaris on Zee TV, also alongside Smriti Irani.

In 2013, She appeared in the Marathi comedy movie Sanshay Kallol. Later she played Kavya Dixit in the Marathi thriller 702 Dixit's. Nigudkar has done several TV commercials including: Santoor Facewash, Whirlpool washing machine, Brooke Bond Taaza Tea, California Almonds, Mahindra Gio, Sony Pal, Tata I Shakti Dal, Waman Hari Pethe Jewellers, ICICI Home Loans, ICICI Prudential, Moov, Poppins, Senquel- F toothpaste, and Parle Must-Bites.

Youtube Channel Link - www.youtube.com/@everythingWOW.

== Films ==
Year	Name	Role	Notes
2004	Uttarayan	Young Kusumwati	National Film Award for Best Feature Film in Marathi
2013	Sanshay Kallol	Asha	
2016	702 Dixit's	Kavya Dixit	

== Television ==
Year	Show	Role	Notes
2006-2007	Betiyaan Apni Yaa Paraaya Dhan	Krishna	Debut Television Series
2007-2008	Mere Apne	Vrinda
2011	Halla Bol	Host	Dance Reality show on ETV Marathi
2013	Savdhaan India	Neha
