= Drive (2019 film) =

2019 Indian film by Tarun Mansukhani

- Official release poster
- Directed by: Tarun Mansukhani
- Written by: Tarun Mansukhani
- Produced by: Hiroo Yash Johar; Karan Johar; Apoorva Mehta
- Starring: Sushant Singh Rajput; Jacqueline Fernandez; Vikramjeet Virk; Sapna Pabbi; Pankaj Tripathi; Boman Irani
- Cinematography: Vishal Sinha
- Edited by: Tarun Mansukhani
- Music by: Songs: Tanishk Bagchi; Amartya Bobo Rahut; Javed–Mohsin; Score: QARAN
- Production company: Dharma Productions
- Distributed by: Netflix
- Release date: 1 November 2019
- Running time: 119 minutes
- Country: India
- Language: Hindi

Drive is a 2019 Indian Hindi-language heist action-thriller film written and directed by Tarun Mansukhani. It was produced by Hiroo Yash Johar, Karan Johar, and Apoorva Mehta. The film stars Sushant Singh Rajput, Jacqueline Fernandez, Vikramjeet Virk, Sapna Pabbi, Boman Irani, and Pankaj Tripathi.

The film was released on Netflix on 1 November 2019 and was panned by critics. It marked Rajput's final film appearance during his lifetime and before his death on 14 June 2020.

== Plot ==
Vibha Singh, a corrupt bureaucrat in the Indian government’s Accounts Department, secretly extorts illegal commissions from clients with the help of her assistant, Hamid Ibrahim, hiding the money within Rashtrapati Bhavan. Her activities come under scrutiny when Kirit Ojha, an official linked to the Prime Minister’s office, assigns officer Irfan Ali to investigate a notorious criminal known as “King,” who has recently carried out a major jewel theft and threatens to target Rashtrapati Bhavan next. Hacker Raj Naik is recruited to decode messages linked to King’s operations.

Irfan and Hamid trace leads to an illegal street racing gang led by Tara Loha, alongside her associates Bikki Kumar and Naina Sethi. A mysterious man named Samar infiltrates the group, gaining Tara’s trust and integrating himself into their circle. Meanwhile, coded messages intercepted by the authorities reveal the location of King’s hidden loot, prompting both the gang and the police to pursue it.

During these events, Samar reveals himself to be King and recruits the group for a high-stakes heist targeting Rashtrapati Bhavan, aiming to steal Singh’s hidden fortune. As the plan unfolds, Irfan discovers that Raj is secretly aiding King, complicating the investigation. Despite setbacks, the heist is executed successfully, and Singh’s hidden wealth is stolen.

However, during their escape, Tara betrays Samar, leading to his arrest by Irfan and Hamid. She then reveals that she herself is the true King, having used Samar as a pawn.

Two months later, Tara—now living under a new identity—attempts to secure the stolen wealth in London. There, she encounters Samar again, disguised as a bank official, along with Irfan, whose true allegiance is revealed to be part of a larger scheme involving Samar. Realizing she has been outmaneuvered, Tara is forced into a final confrontation as the story concludes.

== Cast ==
- Sushant Singh Rajput as Samar
- Jacqueline Fernandez as Tara
- Vikramjeet Virk as Bikki
- Sapna Pabbi as Naina
- Boman Irani as Irfan
- Pankaj Tripathi as Hamid
- Vibha Chibber as Vibha Singh
- Kaustubh Kumar as Raj
- Gaurav Chaudhari as Arjun
- Anuj Jain as Feroz
- Bikramjeet Kanwarpal as Inspector Rathore
- Ramesh Khanna as Mr. Mehta
- Dimple Verma as Mr. Singhania

== Production ==
A party song for the film was filmed in Tel Aviv, Israel.

== Release ==
In January 2019, a teaser was released announcing 28 July 2019 as the film’s release date; however, the release was later postponed, and the distribution rights were subsequently sold to Netflix. The film premiered on 1 November. It is the first original film from Dharma Productions to be released on the platform.

== Soundtrack ==
Drive

Soundtrack album by Tanishk Bagchi, Amartya Bobo Rahut and Javed-Mohsin
- Released: 14 October 2019
- Recorded: 2018–19
- Studio: Rubber Soul Studio
- Genre: Feature film soundtrack
- Length: 13:56
- Language: Hindi
- Label: Zee Music Company
External audio
- Official Audio Jukebox on YouTube

The music is composed by Tanishk Bagchi, Amartya Bobo Rahut and Javed-Mohsin, with lyrics written by Siddhant Kaushal, Ozil Dalal, Tanishk Bagchi, and Danish Sabri.

Track listing
No.	Title	Lyrics	Music	Singer(s)	Length
1.	"Makhna"	Ozil Dalal, Tanishk Bagchi	Tanishk Bagchi	Yasser Desai, Asees Kaur	3:03
2.	"Karma"	Siddhant Kaushal	Amartya Bobo Rahut	Sukriti Kakar	2:26
3.	"Prem Pujari"	Siddhant Kaushal	Amartya Bobo Rahut	Amit Mishra, Akasa Singh, Amartya Bobo Rahut, Dev Arijit	3:03
4.	"Black Car"	Danish Sabri	Javed-Mohsin	Suraj Chauhan, Shivi, Ariff Khan	2:45
5.	"Tu Jaanta Nahi"	Danish Sabri	Javed-Mohsin	Javed-Mohsin, Parry G, Ceazer	2:39
Total length:					13:56

== Reception ==
On the review aggregator website Rotten Tomatoes, 0% of 8 critics' reviews are positive.

Bollywood Hungama gave 2 stars out of 5 and said, 'Drive gives a déjà vu of many other films in this genre and fails to impress on account of confusing and unconvincing plot.' The Free Press Journal rated the movie 1 and a half stars on five and reviewed, ""Drive" is a film without logic and also without magic. It reminds you that Bollywood's newer days of unimaginative cinema are far while over."

Uday Bhatia of LiveMint called the movie a lazy heist thriller. Saibal Chatterjee of NDTV rated the movie 1 on 5 stars and wrote, "Drive is so utterly pointless that one wonders why on earth it is on a streaming platform. That is a mystery. It will take some doing to crack. In the meantime, steer clear!" Shubhra Gupta of The Indian Express rated the movie 1 and a half stars on five and wrote, "Drive seems to have been strung up with influences from Hollywood films featuring sharp racing, sleek cars, and canny 'chors’, but has none of the smarts it is aiming at." Jyoti Sharma Bawa of the Hindustan Times stated "Drive is a lot like the name of its villain – terribly dated. You could build up men named King when they were fighting off others called Lion (or, to be precise, Loin). The film, with its gyrating blondes and street racing, is trying so hard to be the uber-cool racing-heist film but its soul is stuck in the 80s. If it has a soul, that is." Prathyush Parasuraman of Film Companion stated "Uncaring for craft or clarity, 'Dharma Productions’ latest film is a welcome addition to the gang of movies-that-are-so-bad-they-are-good".
