= Pav Dharia =

Punjabi-Australian singer

Pav Dharia is a Punjabi-Australian singer, writer, musician, and cinematographer. He is most famous for his song "Na Ja", which was released on YouTube in early 2017 and by 2019 garnered 297 million views.

== Biography ==
Dharia got inspiration from his father Davinder Dharia, who is a musician himself and runs a music academy in Sydney. His father received training from Punjabi folk singer Lal Chand Yamla Jatt and moved to Australia in 1989.

Dharia made his musical debut in 2012 with the song "Bewafa" and in 2013 he launched his album Red, for which he won the Best Non Resident Punjabi Music Director Award at the PTC Punjabi Music Awards in 2014.

In 2017, Pav Dharia released his second album, titled Solo, which included his popular song "Na Ja" among seven other songs. In 2019, he launched another single, titled "Nahi Karna Viah".

In 2020, he made his Bollywood debut with the song "Funk" in the film Taish. In 2021, a remake of his song "Na Ja" was released as a part of the Bollywood film Sooryavanshi.

== Awards ==
- Best Non Resident Punjabi Music Director at PTC Punjabi Music Awards 2014 for Red
- Best Non Resident Punjabi Music Director at PTC Punjabi Music Awards 2017 for Heer
