= Fearless and United Guards =

Indian mobile video game

FAU-G
- Developer: nCORE Games
- Publisher: nCORE Games
- Engine: Unity
- Platforms: Android, iOS
- Release: 26 January 2021
- Genre: Action
- Mode: Singleplayer

Fearless and United Guards (abbreviated as FAU-G or FAUG) is an action game developed by Bengaluru based company nCORE Games. It was released worldwide on 26 January 2021 for Android and in March 2021 for iOS. The game has been removed from both Google Play Store and App Store as of 2024.

Bollywood actor Akshay Kumar is the brand ambassador of the game and also serves as a mentor to the development process.

== Development ==
The game was first announced by Akshay Kumar through his social media accounts on 4 September 2020. The CEO of nCore Games, Vishal Gondal said that the game had been under development since May 2020, and that developers had been recruited to develop the game before the Indian ban on PUBG Mobile. Gondal stated that FAU-G would not be competing with PUBG, and that it would not be a battle royale.

Akshay Kumar claimed that the intention of the game was to support the Indian Prime Minister's AtmaNirbhar Bharat Movement, and that 20% of the net revenue generated from the game would be donated to Bharat Ke Veer trust, an initiative which was implemented as a collaborative effort to support the families of Indian armed forces.

== Release ==
The game was initially scheduled for an autumn release in 2020, and it was eventually released for Android on 26 January 2021, and for iOS in March 2021.

== Gameplay ==
It features a story mode plotted upon the incidents of the Galwan Valley clash in which the player goes through many close combat fights. Gondal said that FAU-G could incorporate many of India's previous historic border clashes into future episode story lines such as the Kargil incident, the India-Pakistan war of 1971, and the surgical strikes of 2016, among others.

Gondal said, "Once we start getting the data from consumers and what elements they like, we will keep developing the game further. Based on feedback, various modes like a PvP mode and a Battle Royale mode can come to the game in the next few months."

== Reception ==
On release, FAU-G received generally mixed-to-negative reviews. The Indian Express gave the game 2 stars of 5, and stated, "good graphics let down by boring gameplay". India Today gave the game 4.5 stars out of 10, and stated, "an incomplete lackluster game that is no PUBG rival". Techradar gave the game 2 stars out five and stated, "FAUG is basic, bland and can hardly be called a game worthy of attention in 2021. While it was rather successful at grabbing the spotlight with the announcement which led to millions of pre-registration, its shoddy content is just a waste of an opportunity." The Hindu gave the game a mixed review with praise for its fluid movement controls, the smooth frame-rate and decent graphics, but criticism for its repetitive game play. India Today gave that game 2 out of 5 stars and stated, "As a starting point, FAU-G is about okay as I was not expecting much from the game. However, the lack of any depth content, functionality, or even experience-wise is the main problem. This clearly seems like a rushed-up job to capitalize on the interest and nationalistic feelings around Republic Day. Though the company has stated that FAU-G is not meant to replace or copy PUBG, inevitable comparisons are bound to happen."

It was also a subject of review bombing from audiences, who compared it unfavorably to other battle royale games like PUBG, but still remained the top downloaded game on Play Store. It was the number one game in the 'free games' category on the play store, until after the reviews, it came to 11th position.

=== Developer's response ===
In response to the criticisms, Vishal Gondal, Founder of nCore Games, stated in a telephone interview with Gadget 360 that, "This is really quite unfortunate. We thought that being an Indian studio, we will receive support and encouragement from people. I can understand we are not five stars, but we are not one star either. I mean, we are somewhere in the middle right now." He called the prevalence of one-star ratings an anomaly.
