= Vaghadi =

Village in Maharashtra

- village
- Location in Maharashtra, India Vaghadi (India)
- Coordinates: 19.9246662°N 72.9608202°E
- Country: India
- State: Maharashtra
- District: Palghar
- Taluka: Dahanu
- Elevation: 53 m (174 ft)

Population (2011)
  - Total: 1,560
- Time zone: UTC+5:30 (IST)
- 2011 census code: 551693

Vaghadi is a village in the Palghar district of Maharashtra, India. It is located in the Dahanu taluka.

== Demographics ==
According to the 2011 census of India, Vaghadi has 295 households. The effective literacy rate (i.e. the literacy rate of population excluding children aged 6 and below) is 65.27%.

Demographics (2011 Census)
	Total	Male	Female
Population	1560	777	783
Children aged below 6 years	204	104	100
Scheduled caste	0	0	0
Scheduled tribe	1538	764	774
Literates	885	537	348
Workers (all)	905	434	471
Main workers (total)	819	404	415
Main workers: Cultivators	616	308	308
Main workers: Agricultural labourers	62	29	33
Main workers: Household industry workers	34	7	27
Main workers: Other	107	60	47
Marginal workers (total)	86	30	56
Marginal workers: Cultivators	58	20	38
Marginal workers: Agricultural labourers	7	1	6
Marginal workers: Household industry workers	4	1	3
Marginal workers: Others	17	8	9
Non-workers	655	343	312
