= Sardar Ka Grandson =

2021 Indian film by Kaashvie Nair

- Official release poster
- Directed by: Kaashvie Nair
- Written by: Kaashvie Nair
- Screenplay by: Anuja Chauhan; Kaashvie Nair
- Produced by: Bhushan Kumar; Divya Khosla Kumar; Krishan Kumar; Monisha Advani; Madhu Bhojwani; Nikkhil Advani; John Abraham
- Starring: Arjun Kapoor; Neena Gupta; Rakul Preet Singh
- Cinematography: Mahendra J. Shetty
- Edited by: Maahir Zaveri
- Music by: Score: Gulraj Singh; Songs: Tanishk Bagchi
- Production companies: T-Series; Emmay Entertainment; JA Entertainment
- Distributed by: Netflix
- Release date: 18 May 2021
- Running time: 140 minutes
- Country: India
- Language: Hindi

Sardar Ka Grandson (lit. 'Sardar's Grandson') is a 2021 Indian Hindi-language comedy-drama film directed by Kaashvie Nair and written by Anuja Chauhan and Kaashvi Nair. The film was produced by Bhushan Kumar, Divya Khosla Kumar, Krishan Kumar, Monisha Advani, Madhu Bhojwani, Nikkhil Advani and John Abraham under the banners T-Series, Emmay Entertainment and JA Entertainment. The film features Arjun Kapoor, Neena Gupta and Rakul Preet Singh in lead roles with John Abraham and Aditi Rao Hydari in special appearances.

The film was released on 18 May 2021 on Netflix.

== Plot ==
Amreek resides in Los Angeles with his girlfriend Radha. Both run a movers and packers company called ‘Gently Gently’. Amreek has a laidback and carefree attitude and doesn't believe in owning up to his mistakes. This affects his work and also his relations with Radha. Fed up with his behaviour, Radha breaks up with him. Amreek is devastated.

This is when his father, Gurkeerat aka Gurki calls him from his home in Amritsar. He tells Amreek that he should return immediately as his grandmother, Sardar Kaur, is sick. Sardar, aged 90, has a tumour. The doctors advise Gurki that they should take her home as operating on her at this age can prove fatal. Gurki realizes Sardar doesn't have much time but he hides this fact from Sardar.

Sardar, meanwhile, has a wish. She wants to go to Lahore and visit the house that she built with her husband, late Gursher Singh in 1946. A year later, during Partition, Gursher was stabbed to death while fighting the rioters. Sardar however escaped and reached India. Since then, she has been missing Gursher and the house. Hence, it's her desire to visit Pakistan so that she could see her ancestral house. Sardar tells Amreek about it.

Gurki advises Sardar that she can't travel in this condition. But Amreek realizes how much this means to her. He promises her that he'll help fulfil her wish. He tries to get her a visa. However, her application is rejected as she's blacklisted from visiting Pakistan. This is because a few years ago, she had attacked a Pakistani official, Saqlain Niazi when she had gone to watch an India vs Pakistan cricket match in Mohali.

This is when Amreek learns that Radha has transplanted a nearly hundred-year-old tree in the United States. Amreek thus begins to learn about structural relocation and realizes that a lot of people have successfully lifted a house and transplanted it to a different location. Amreek requests help from both the government of India and Pakistan for his mission. Both decide to help him, in principle. Amreek then decides to visit Lahore. However, he hides about his plan from Sardar. He fears that if he fails in his endeavour, she'll be heartbroken. Hence, Amreek pretends to go back to Los Angeles in front of Sardar.

Amreek reaches Lahore and is successfully able to find Sardar's house. But when he reaches there, he sees that the local authorities are about to demolish the structure. But he stops it and manages to convince the mayor (who is actually Saqlain Niazi, the official whom his grandmother had hit in the match) he brings back the house, thus fulfilling Sardar's wish.

In the end of the film, it is revealed that Sardar dies seven years after, and divides the property in three equal shares. It is also revealed that Amreek and Radha marry and move to back to America and have two daughters and a son, named after his grandmother.

== Cast ==
- Arjun Kapoor as Amreek Singh
- Neena Gupta as Swanmeet "Sardar" Kaur, Amreek's grandmother
  - Aditi Rao Hydari as Young Swanmeet "Sardar" Kaur (Special appearance)
- Rakul Preet Singh as Radha Kaur Khasan, Amreek's love interest
- John Abraham as Gursher Singh, Amreek's deceased grandfather (Special appearance)
- Kanwaljit Singh as Gurkeerat "Gurkhi" Singh, Amreek's father
- Soni Razdan as Simmi Kaur Sodhi, Amreek's mother
- Kumud Mishra as Saqlain Niazi, Lahore city mayor
- Divya Seth as Honey, Sardar's second daughter-in-law
- Mahika Patiyal as Pinky Kaur, Amreek's sister
- Masood Akhtar as Khan Sahab
- Ravjeet Singh as Lovely
- Akashdeep Sabir as Contractor
- Mir Mehroos as Chhote
- Shahid Lateef as Inspector Rauf Khalid
- Arvinder Bhatti as Gurbaz Chacha
- Rajiv Kachroo as Pakistani High Commissioner Qureshi
- Priya Tandon as Pakistani Journalist

== Production ==
The principal photography commenced in Mumbai on 16 November 2019.

== Reception ==
On the review aggregator website Rotten Tomatoes, 20% of 10 critics' reviews are positive, with an average rating of 3.8/10.

== Soundtrack ==
Sardar Ka Grandson

Soundtrack album by Tanishk Bagchi
- Released: 18 May 2021
- Recorded: 2020
- Genre: Feature film soundtrack
- Length: 17:28
- Language: Hindi
- Label: T-Series

Tanishk Bagchi chronology
Ajeeb Daastaans (2021)	Sardar Ka Grandson (2021)	Bell Bottom (2021)

Official audio
- Sardar Ka Grandson - Full Album on YouTube

The film's soundtrack is composed by Tanishk Bagchi. whereas, lyrics being written by Tanishk Bagchi, Millind Gaba, Happy Raikoti and Manoj Muntashir.

The song Jee Ni Karda is remake version of the 2008 track “Dhoor” by Manak-E.

The song Main Teri Ho Gayi is remake version of Punjabi singer Millind Gaba's 2017 song of the same name.

No.	Title	Lyrics	Singer(s)	Length
1.	"Jee Ni Karda"	Tanishk Bagchi	Jass Manak, Manak-E, Nikhita Gandhi	3:08
2.	"Main Teri Ho Gayi"	Millind Gaba, Tanishk Bagchi, Happy Raikoti	Millind Gaba, Pallavi Gaba	2:56
3.	"Dil Nahin Todna"	Tanishk Bagchi	Zara Khan, Tanishk Bagchi	3:57
4.	"Bandeya"	Manoj Muntashir	Divya Kumar	2:50
5.	"Bandeya" (Film Version)	Manoj Muntashir	Divya Kumar	4:37
Total length:				17:28
