= UTV Indiagames =

Indian video game developer (1999–2010)

UTV Indiagames Limited
- Formerly: Indiagames (1999-2010)
- Type: Subsidiary
- Industry: Video games
- Founded: 1999; 27 years ago
- Founder: Vishal Gondal
- Defunct: 2014; 12 years ago
- Headquarters: Navi Mumbai, Maharashtra, India
- Key people: Sameer Ganapathy
- Parent: The Walt Disney Company India

UTV Indiagames (formerly known as Indiagames) was a video game publisher across various platforms for the South Asian market. It was founded in 1999 by Vishal Gondal, as a five-member team. UTV Indiagames in its current iteration is solely a publishing brand with development being outsourced. UTV Indiagames is owned by UTV Software Communications, a wholly owned media conglomerate of The Walt Disney Company India.

Indiagames is India’s largest integrated game developer and publisher across digital devices. The company has partnered with several major game publishers, media companies and telecom companies such as EA, THQ, Atari, Universal, Fox, Warner Brothers, Sony, Verizon, Vodafone, Airtel, AT&T, Telstra and others. Indiagames’ successful titles include the first Spider-Man game on mobile, BioShock, Garfield and Godzilla.

The company runs the only subscription-based PC games service in India, called Games-on-Demand. It operates on all major broadband operators. Indiagames’ triple-play games model is complemented by its presence as the largest operator of UTV Games Services with leading satellite TV service providers in India.

== History ==
In 1999, Vishal Gondal founded Indiagames, then a five-member team. Indiagames primarily engaged in publishing and developing games across various platforms such as Internet, PC, broadband, mobile phones, PDAs, handheld gaming devices and consoles.

In 2005, TOM online Games, a subsidiary of TOM Online Inc took major stakes in the company. Vishal Gondal kept his position as CEO.

In 2007, the Indian company UTV Software Communications acquired a majority stake in Indiagames.

In June 2010, Indiagames was re-branded as UTV Indiagames. In 2011, the remaining stake in Indiagames was acquired by Disney for around $100 million. At the time of acquisition, Indiagames was making a profit of $400,000 per year on revenues of $11 million as reported by various publications. In April 2013, Vishal Gondal stepped down from control of the company and was replaced by Sameer Ganapathy.

== Studio ==
- 3Lakshya creates games for the international market. It also researches game development on all new platforms.
- Chandra works on various game titles for mobile phones and DTH set-top boxes. These games, created on multiple platforms, are based on popular genres including action, adventure, puzzle, sports and racing, and follow themes such as Bollywood, cricket, reality shows, and celebrities.
