= Amartya Bobo Rahut =

Indian musician (born 1977)

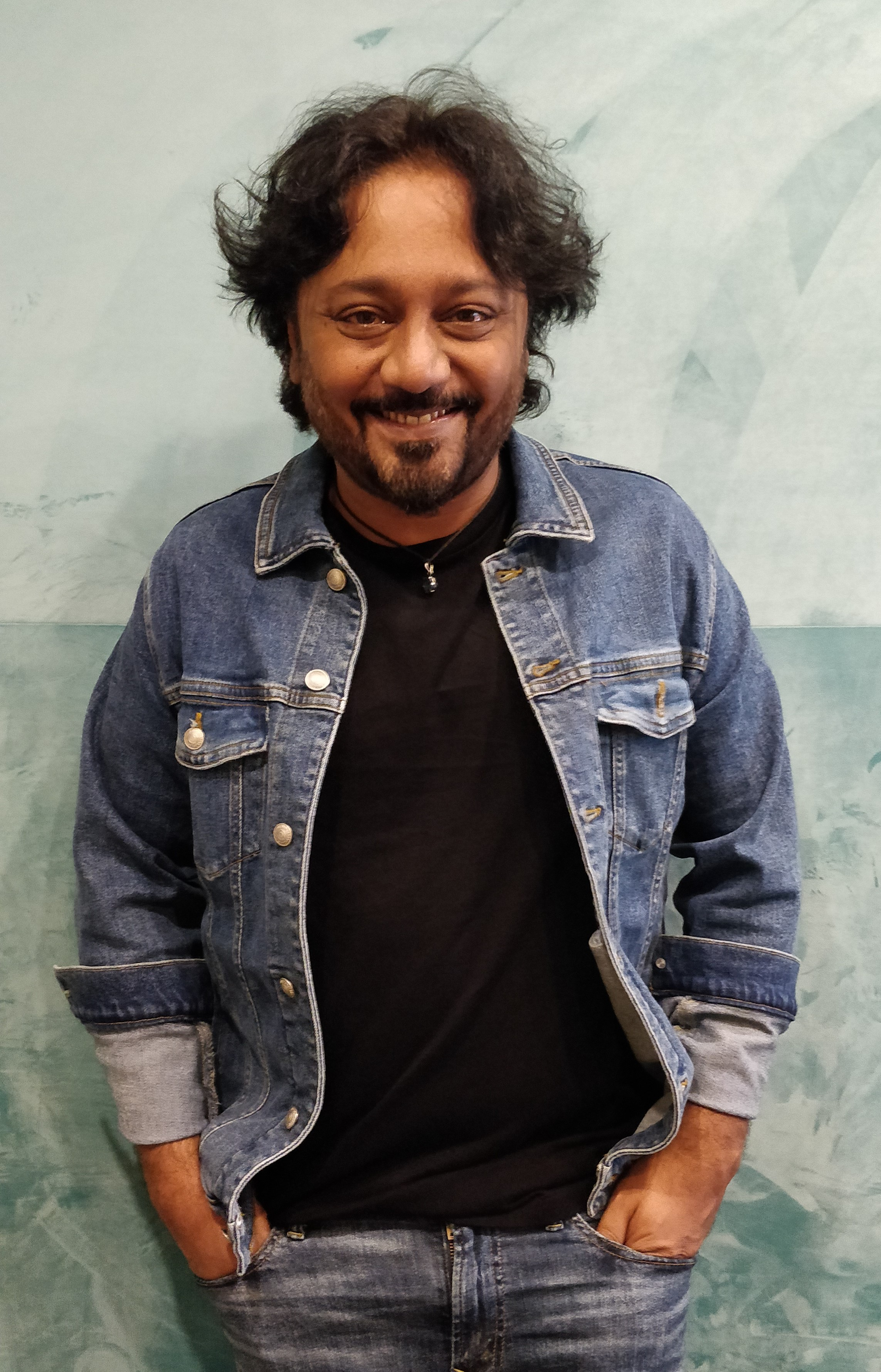

Background information
- Also known as: Amartya Rahut, Bobo
- Born: 11 May 1977 (age 48); Jalpaiguri, West Bengal, India
- Genres: Film; Indi-Pop; Rock; Indian Classical
- Occupations: Music Composer; Record Producer; Singer
- Instruments: Guitar, Keyboard
- Years active: 2001–present
- Website: amartyarahut.com

Amartya Bobo Rahut is an Indian singer-songwriter, music producer and an independent artist from Mumbai, India. Bobo has composed and produced music for films, albums and singles such as Shaam Simti, Kaisi Ho ?, Darbaan, Tu Hai Mera Sunday, Drive, Aurangzeb, Uttarayan, Tumhari Sulu, Yadon Ke Idiot Box Mein, Om The Fusion Band, etc.

Bobo has also done music for over 2500 TV commercials, and he has worked for some of the biggest brands and campaigns including Godrej, ITC, McDonald's, Hero Motocorp, Bharti AXA, HDFC Bank, Max New York, Haywards, Kingfisher IPL, Kurkure, Mirinda, Thums Up etc. Bobo has to his credit, the bronze at Cannes Lions International Festival of Creativity for his Levi's Slim Fit Commercial for best soundtrack. He also won the award for best soundtrack at Promax Awards for the MTV/Nickelodeon's ‘Jingle Bell – Bhangra Version’. Bobo has composed various signature tunes such as Colors TV's Flute Tune, BSNL's Signature Tune, Godrej's Whistle Mnemonic, Pepperfry's Brand Tune, etc.

He is currently working on his independent music.

== Early life ==
After completing his schooling and higher education from St. Xavier's College, Kolkata, Bobo has started his professional career as a guitar player in Kolkata in 1992 in the bands Shiva, The Fifth Dimension, Cactus, Paras Pathor (founding member), Prakriti and Asteroids.

It was during the later part of those formative years, Bobo became a music composer. Bobo opted for finding a bigger canvas and he decided to shift base to Mumbai in the year 2001.

== Discography ==
Year	Album (s)	Track(s)	Lyricist(s)	Singer(s)
2021	Noor-Kasauli - Single	Noor-Kasauli	Pratyush Prakash	Amartya Bobo Rahut
2021	Thikana - Single	Thikana	Niket Pandey	Amartya Bobo Rahut
2021	Kaisi Ho ? - Single	Kaisi Ho ?	Siddhant Kaushal	Amartya Bobo Rahut
2021	Mere Aulia - Single	Mere Aulia	Niket Pandey	Brijesh Shandilya, Shibani Kashyap, Dev Arijit & Amartya Bobo Rahut
2020	Chup Chup - Single	Chup Chup	Milind Dhaimade	Amartya Bobo Rahut
2020	Darbaan	Dil Bandar	Siddhant Kaushal	Tushar Joshi
2020	Darbaan	Rang Bhariya	Siddhant Kaushal	Gujraj Singh, Amrita Singh
2020	Darbaan	Khushmizaaj	Manoj Yadav	Arijit Singh
2020	Shaam Simti - Single	Shaam Simti	Niket Pandey	Amartya Bobo Rahut
2020	Jai Mummy Di	Dariyaganj	Siddhant Kaushal	Arijit Singh, Dhvani Bhanushali
2020	Jai Mummy Di	"Dariyaganj" (version 2)	Siddhant Kaushal	Dhvani Bhanushali
2019	Drive	Karma	Siddhant Kaushal	Sukriti Kakkar
2019	Drive	Prem Pujari	Siddhant Kaushal	Amit Mishra, Akasha Singh, Dev Arijit
2019	22 Yards	Sanjheya	Nikhita Gandhi, Pradeep Sran	
2017	Tu Hai Mera Sunday	Thodi Si Jagah	Milind Dhaimade	Arijit Singh
2017	Tu Hai Mera Sunday	Dhondlo	Milind Dhaimade	Arijit Singh
2017	Tu Hai Mera Sunday	Tu Hai Mera Sunday	Milind Dhaimade	Shalmali Kholgade
2017	Tu Hai Mera Sunday	Yeh Mera Mann	Milind Dhaimade	Ash King
2017	Tu Hai Mera Sunday	Yeh Jo Pyaar Hai	Milind Dhaimade	Nandini Srikar
2017	Tumhari Sulu	Farrata	Siddhant Kaushal	Armaan Malik, Aadityan, Arijit Dev, Tushar Joshi
2013	Aurangzeb	Barbaadiyaan	Puneet Sharma	Ram Sampath, Sasheh Aagha
2013	Aurangzeb	Barbaadi	Puneet Sharma	Mohan Kanan
2011	Rewind – Nine Lost Stories	Naina Tore	Neelesh Mishra	Shilpa Rao
2011	Rewind – Nine Lost Stories	Unka Khayal	Neelesh Mishra	Shilpa Rao, Neelesh Mishra
2011	Rewind – Nine Lost Stories	Yadon Ke Idiot Box Mein – 1	Neelesh Mishra	Shilpa Rao
2011	Rewind – Nine Lost Stories	Roobru	Neelesh Mishra	Shilpa Rao, Neelesh Mishra
2011	Rewind – Nine Lost Stories	Yadon Ke Idiot Box Mein – 2	Neelesh Mishra	Suraj Jagan
2011	Rewind – Nine Lost Stories	Dil Raffu	Neelesh Mishra	Shilpa Rao
2011	Rewind – Nine Lost Stories	Shayad	Neelesh Mishra	Suraj Jagan, Shilpa Rao
2011	Rewind – Nine Lost Stories	Aangan	Neelesh Mishra	Suraj Jagan
2011	Rewind – Nine Lost Stories	Maazi	Neelesh Mishra	Suraj Jagan
2009	Aagey Se Right	Hippie Tu Jhoom	Hitesh Kewalya	Keerthi Sagathia, Sunidhi Chauhan and Amartya Rahut
2009	Aagey Se Right	More Piya - Bar	Shadab Akhtar and Manish Hariprasad	Deepika Bhattacharya
2009	Aagey Se Right	Hippie Tu Jhoom - Remix	Hitesh Kewalya	Keerthi Sagathia, Sunidhi Chauhan and Amartya Rahut
2009	Aagey Se Right	Love Flashback	Hitesh Kewalya	Bappi Lahiri, Suzanne D'Mello and Amartya Rahut
2009	Aagey Se Right	Mahiya	Hitesh Kewalya	Shilpa Rao and Clinton Cerejo
2005	Om – The Fusion Band	Son Chiraiya		Shriram Iyer
2005	Om – The Fusion Band	Piya		Shriram Iyer
2005	Om – The Fusion Band	Tum Tana		Shriram Iyer
2005	Om – The Fusion Band	Maula		Shriram Iyer
2005	Om – The Fusion Band	Mohana		Shriram Iyer
2005	Om – The Fusion Band	Baadal		Shriram Iyer
2005	Om – The Fusion Band	Samjhaun Kaise Mere		Shriram Iyer
2005	Om – The Fusion Band	Man Ke Darpan Mein		Shriram Iyer
2005	Uttarayan	Dhund Hote Shabd Saare	Kaustubh Savarkar	Ravindra Bijur
2005	Uttarayan	Raan Hai Uthle Uthle	Kaustubh Savarkar	Ravindra Sathe

== Awards and recognition ==
Year	Ceremony	Category / Award	Work
2012	Promax Awards, India	Best Music Composition	Nickelodeon's ‘Jingle Bell – Bhangra Version’
2011	GiMA Awards	Best Non Film Music Debut	Rewind – Nine Lost Stories
2005	Zee Gaurav Awards	Best Music Album of the Year – Marathi	Uttarayan
2005	Cannes Lions International Festival of Creativity	Bronze	Levi's Slim Fit Commercial
