= Thousand Thoughts =

Studio album by Bohemia
- Released: August 30, 2012
- Recorded: 2011–2012
- Genre: Desi hip hop
- Length: 0:36:25
- Label: Sony Music India
- Producer: Bohemia

Bohemia chronology
Da Rap Star (2009)	Thousand Thoughts (2012)	Skull & Bones: The Final Chapter (2017)

Thousand Thoughts is the fourth studio album by rapper Bohemia. It was released on August 30, 2012, under the label of Sony Music India. It won Best International Album award at PTC Punjabi Music Awards in 2013. It was produced and recorded at L.A.-based Diamond Mine Studio by Ravi Soni.

== Track listing ==
All lyrics are written by Bohemia.

Track listing
No.	Title	Length
1.	"Koi Nai" (Intro)	00:54
2.	"Beparwah" (featuring Devika Chawla)	04:08
3.	"Faqeer"	03:30
4.	"Lela"	03:03
5.	"Na Suno" (featuring Jasmine Sandlas)	03:26
6.	"Desi Put Jawan"	03:48
7.	"Aja Ni Aja" (featuring Baby Bash)	03:18
8.	"IDGAF" (featuring Haji Springer)	02:40
9.	"Hazaar Gallan"	04:29
10.	"Right Now" (featuring 3AM)	03:40
11.	"Future"	03:30

== Awards ==
Year	Nominee / work	Award	Result
2013	"Thousand Thoughts"	Best International Album at PTC Punjabi music awards	Won
