= Bohemia (rapper) =

Pakistani-American singer and producer (born 1979)

- بوہیمیا
- Born: Roger David; 15 October 1979 (age 47); Karachi, Sindh, Pakistan
- Occupations: Rapper; poet; singer; songwriter; record producer
- Years active: 2001–present
- Spouse: Sunny David (m. 2015)
- Musical career
- Origin: Oakland, California, U.S.
- Genres: Desi hip hop; hip hop
- Labels: Universal Music Group; Sony Music India; Kali Denali Music; T-Series; Yash Raj Films; Saga Music; Coke Studio Pakistan; Geet MP3
- Website: thepunjabirapstar.com

Roger David (Note: Punjabi: راجر ڈیوڈ, pronounced [ɾaːd͡ʒəɾ ɖeːʋɪɖ]) (born 15 October 1979), known professionally as Bohemia, (Note: Punjabi: بوہیمیا) is a Pakistani-American singer-songwriter, rapper, and record producer. He is regarded as one of the pioneers of the Desi hip hop industry and is mainly associated with Punjabi hip-hop music.

== Early and personal life ==
Bohemia was born on 15 October 1979 in Karachi, Sindh, to a Punjabi Christian family originally from Lahore, Punjab. He was raised and educated in Peshawar, Khyber Pakhtunkhwa. At the age of 13, he moved to the United States with his family. Bohemia married Sunny David on 13 June 2017 in a small ceremony in the Bay Area of San Francisco, California.

== Career ==
In early 2000, he moved to join his cousin in Oakland who was working at a West Oakland recording studio and introduced him to a young hip-hop producer called Sha One (Seth Agress). Discovering that they both shared a deep interest in music, they made plans to form their own record label, which they subsequently called "The Outfit Entertainment". After Sha heard Bohemia reciting something he had written in Punjabi he asked him to rap it over one of his beats. Over the next few months, he wrote a library of lyrics. This would become the arsenal for his debut album Vich Pardesan De (transl. In The Foreign Land) – an autobiographical story of his life as a Desi youngster adapting to the streets of America, which he and Sha One produced together. Their first single "Sha Te Ra" was released as a music video, but the song itself was not included on Vich Pardesan De.

His following sophomore album, Pesa Nasha Pyar (transl. Money, Intoxication, Love) became the first full-length Punjabi rap album to be released by a major label. It was recorded and produced by Sha One and Bohemia in their downtown Oakland studio. After nearly two years of perfecting their sound and style, the album was finally released. The album also featured veteran American rapper Snoop Dogg, which marked the first international hip hop collaboration in the desi hip-hop scene. He subsequently signed a multi-record deal with music label Universal Music Group. In 2006, Pesa Nasha Pyar was on the Top 10 downloads of Maxim, and No. 3 on Planet M chart India. Around the same time, his first album Vich Pardesan De got nominated in BBC UK top ten albums. Da Rap Star, his third album, received four nominations at the UK Asian Music Awards and PTC Punjabi music awards. It also remained at No. 1 on Planet M chart for several weeks.

He performed the title track for Warner Bros film Chandni Chowk To China, appearing in the film with Akshay Kumar and Deepika Padukone. A few months later, he also performed the title track for another film featuring Akshay Kumar, 8 x 10 Tasveer. In 2011, he gave a song as a present to Akshay Kumar for his first Hollywood production Breakaway.

In May 2012, Sony Music India signed Bohemia. As part of the association, Sony Music managed his music albums, launches and shows under its management program. In September 2012, he released his fourth studio album Thousand Thoughts.

In 2013, it won Best Non-Resident Punjabi Album award at PTC Punjabi Music Awards. At the Coke Studio Sessions, he was the first rap artist, appearing in their fifth season where he performed three songs. Bohemia has also recorded a collaboration with Sonu Kakkar and Jamaican American artist Sean Kingston.

In 2015, Bohemia & J.Hind launched their own music label Kali Denali Music. Bohemia has since departed the company & J.Hind is currently the CEO. Bohemia appeared in XXL magazine in New York.

In 2017, Bohemia released his fifth studio album Skull & Bones: The Final Chapter, after releasing the first single, "Zamana Jali" on 18 October 2016 and the second single "Meri Jeet" on 7 February 2017, just a week before the album's release.

On 26 July 2018, he released the first single "Sandesa" from his EP Skull & Bones: Volume 2 was released, which turned out to be a remixed version of one of his unreleased singles. On 27 November 2018, Bohemia released the first original single "Koi Farak Nahi" for his EP Skull & Bones: Volume 2. In an interview, Bohemia stated his album was going to be released as an EP, but all the songs were eventually released as singles.

At the end of 2018, Bohemia embarked on a tour in India, where he performed in Chandigarh, Delhi, Mumbai, and Rajasthan. He also appeared and performed a remix of the song "Kurbaan" on an episode of McDowell's No.1 Yaari Jam alongside Raftaar and Salim Merchant.

In February 2019, Bohemia released the third single "Umeed" from his EP Skull and Bones: Volume 2. In the following month, he also collaborated with Indian rapper Sidhu Moose Wala on the song "Same Beef".

In April 2022, Bohemia released his fifth studio album named as "I Am I.C.O.N" (In Control Of Nothing). In this album Bohemia features guest appearances from artists like Noveen Morris and many more. The music of the album was produced by Deep Jandu.

In April 2024, he released his sixth studio album, Rap Star Reloaded, comprising 10 tracks.

== Awards and nominations ==
Year	Nominee / work	Award	Result
2010	"Da Rap Star"	Best Punjabi Album at PTC Punjabi Music Awards	Nominated
2010	"Da Rap Star"	Best Sound Recording at PTC Punjabi Music Awards	Nominated
2010	"Da Rap Star"	Best Punjabi Music Director at PTC Punjabi Music Awards	Nominated
2010	"Da Rap Star"	Best International Album at UK Asian Music Awards	Nominated
2013	"Thousand Thoughts"	Best International Album at PTC Punjabi Music Awards	Won
2015	"Excellence Music"	Award of Excellence - Music at Festival Of Globe	Won
2015	"Music Career"	Make it large at Mirchi Music Awards Punjabi	Won
2016	"Jaguar"	Best Duo at PTC Punjabi Music Awards	Nominated
2016	"Patola"	Best Duo at PTC Punjabi Music Awards	Won
2017	"Hathiyar 2"	Best Duo at PTC Punjabi Music Awards	Nominated
2018	"Special Award"	International Punjabi Icon at PTC Punjabi Music Awards	Won
2020	"Pagol"	Best Music Video at PTC Music Awards	Won

== Discography ==
=== Studio albums ===
Title	Album details
Vich Pardesan De	Released: 2002; Label: Outfit Entertainment, Under Exclusive License From Universal Music India Pvt Ltd; Format: CD, Digital download, streaming
Pesa Nasha Pyar	Released: 2006; Label: Outfit Entertainment, Under Exclusive License From Universal Music India Pvt Ltd; Format: CD, Digital download, streaming
Da Rap Star	Released: 2009; Label: Universal Music India; Format: CD, Digital download, streaming
Thousand Thoughts	Released: 4 September 2012; Label: Sony Music India; Format: CD, Digital download, streaming
Skull & Bones: The Final Chapter	Released: 18 October 2016; Label: T-Series; Format: CD, Digital download, streaming
I Am I.C.O.N: In Control Of Nothing	Released: 20 April 2022; Music: Deep Jandu; Label: Geet Mp3; Format: Digital download, streaming
Rap Star Reloaded	Released: 20 April 2024; Music: Bohemia; Label: Saga Music; Format: Digital download, streaming

=== Mixtapes ===
Title	Details
KDM Mixtape Volume 1	Released: 2016; Label: Kali Denali Music; Format: CD, Digital download, streaming

=== Extended Plays ===
Bohemia EP (2025)

Released on 28 March 2025, this is Bohemia's first official EP featuring six tracks.

Track listing – Bohemia EP
Track No.	Title	Duration
1	I'm Gone	3:11
2	School	3:20
3	Maureen	4:19
4	Call Me	3:51
5	Baby	3:38
6	Monkey	4:56

== Singles discography ==
=== As lead artist ===
Track	Year	Peak chart position		Music	Album
Track	Year	UK Asian	UK Punjabi	Music	Album
All Around The World (featuring AMAN (Amaar & Siege))	2003			Bohemia	
Evury day	2006			Bohemia	
Keep It G (featuring Kurupt)	2007			Bohemia	
Kala Doriya (featuring Dj Chintu)	2009			Bohemia	
Chalo (featuring IQ)	2009			Bohemia	
Sher-E-Punjab (featuring Mika Singh)	2009			Mika Singh	
Dunali (featuring Mika Singh)	2009			Bohemia ft. Mika Singh	
My Shoes (featuring MiddleMan & Mr. Kay)	2010			Bohemia	
Sh Sh Sharabi (featuring Gippy Grewal)	2010			Sukshinder Shinda	
What Have I Learned (featuring Jennifer)	2010			Bohemia	
Bulawa (featuring Pakman & D-Naar)	2011			Bohemia	
Paisay Da Nasha (with Rohail Hyatt)	2012			Rohail Hyaat	Coke Studio India: Season 5
School Di Kitaab (with Rohail Hyatt)	2012			Rohail Hyaat	Coke Studio India: Season 5
Kandyaari Dhol Geet (with Chakwal Group & Rohail Hyatt)	2012			Rohail Hyaat	Coke Studio India: Season 5
yaad anah (featuring Mixman Shawn)	2012			Bohemia	
Paigam	2012			Bohemia	
Rooh (the Soul)	2013			Bohemia	
Rooh Remix (ft. Pardhaan)	2013			Bohemia	
Phenomenon	2014			Bohemia	
Brand New Swag (ft. Haji Springer & Panda)	2014			Bohemia	
Yaad Anah	2014			Bohemia	
Wake N Bake (ft. Avenue OB)	2014			Avenue OB	
Main	2014			Bohemia	
Salute	2015			Bohemia	
Taur (featuring Gippy Grewal)	2015			Haji Springer	Faraar
Mere Baare	2015			Haji Springer	
Muqabla: (J.Hind; Bohemia; Shaxe Oriah)	2016			Haji Springer & Shaxe Oriah	KDM Mixtape Vol. 1
Gametime: (Bohemia; J.Hind; Shaxe Oriah; Pardhaan; Haji Springer; Raxstar; 3AM Sukhi; Young Desi; Gangis Khan; Deep Jandu)	2016			Haji Springer & Shaxe Oriah	KDM Mixtape Vol. 1
Gang Bang Operation (with: Gitta Bains; Bohemia; Doughboi Fiji)	2016			Deep Jandu	
Club Pub (with Sukh-E & Ramji Gulati & Ali Quli Mirza)	2016			Ali Quli Mirza	
MTBK (with Lazarus ft. Deep Jandu & Shaxe Oriah)	2017			Shaxe Oriah	
Purana Wala	2017			Bohemia	MTV Spoken Word
Jaane Jana (with J Hind)	2017			Shaxe Oriah	MTV Spoken Word
Gumrah	2018			Bohemia	Skulls and Bones V2
Gaddi (ft. Pardhaan)	2018			Sukh E	
Khatra (ft. Gitta Bains)	2018			Prabh Near	
I Don't Wanna Say That (ft Gitta Bains & Gurlez Akhtar)	2018			Prabh Near	
Sandesa	2018			Bohemia	
Aaja Ni Aaja	2018			DJ Shadow Dubai	
Oh Kudi (with Sab Bhanot)	2018			Bohemia	
Jackpot (with Asif Ballaj)	2018			Ali Mustafa	
Robo The Punjabi Lion Anthem	2019			Bohemia	
FOREIGN (with 3AM Sukhi & J.HIND)	2019			Haji Springer	
Umeed	2019			Bohemia	Skull and Bones V2
Same Beef (featuring Sidhu Moose Wala)	2019	24	11	Byg Byrd	
Kadi Kadi	2019			Bohemia	
Virus	2020			Bohemia	Skull and Bones V2
"Phir Ek Tera Pyar" (featuring Devika)	2020			Shaxe Oriah	
Nishana (featuring Jazzy B)	2020			Shaxe Oriah (Lyrics: Bohemia & Gitta Bains)	
Kaisa Nasha (with Noveen Morris, j.hind & Deepak Godiyal)	2020			Shaxe Oriah	KDM Playlist Vol. 1
"Aish"	2020			UV Beats & Hystayx	Skull and Bones V2
"Paar" (with Abrar-Ul-Haq)	2020			Saga Music & Kali Denali Music	
Crown Prince (Ft. Jazzy B)	2020			Harj Nagra (Lyrics: Parry Sarpanch)	
Raaz	2020			Bohemia	Skull and Bones V2
Ek Din (featuring Karan Aujla, J.Hind, The Game)	2020			Shaxe Oriah	
Saari Duniya	2020			Rohail Hyatt	Coke Studio 2020
Ajnabi	2022			Bohemia	
Tumhara Pyar	2022			Deep Jandu	I Am I.C.O.N.

=== As featured artist ===
Track	Year	Peak chart positions		Music	Album	Notes
Track	Year	UK Asian	UK Punjabi	Music	Album	Notes
Holi Holi Nach (Tarsame Singh Saini ft. Bohemia)	2010			Tarsame Singh Saini		
Hathiyar (Gitta Bains ft. Bohemia)	2010			Jatinder Shah		
Daru (Gitta Bains ft. Bohemia)	2010			Gitta Bains		
Bandookaan (Desi Beam ft. Bohemia)	2011			Desi Beam		
Jee Karda (Bobby B ft. Bohemia)	2011			Bobby B		
Maar Charapa (Sir Punj ft. Bohemia)	2012			Sir Punj & Rishi Rich (Unreleased Track)		
Adhi Raat (Jasmine Sandlas ft. Bohemia)	2012			Bohemia		
Jaane Jana (J.Hind ft. Bohemia)	2012			J.Hind		
Talli (Gitta Bains ft. Bohemia)	2012			Tigerstyle		
My Ride Remix (The Bilz & Kashif ft. Glasses Malone, Bohemia, Drega, Nivla)	2013					
Bad Boy (D Major ft. Bohemia)	2014			Tigerstyle		
Preet (Haji Springer ft. Pree Mayall & Bohemia)	2014			Haji Springer		
U n Me (Sean Kingston ft. Sonu Kakkar, & Bohemia)	2014			Iraj		
Akkha Mumbai (Mun E. Fame ft. Bohemia)	2014			Mun E. Fame		
Fire (Gitta Bains ft. Bohemia)	2014			Haji Springer		
Saheli (Gurdeep Mehndi ft. Bohemia)	2014			Gurdeep Mehndi		
Meri Bandook (Haji Springer ft. Bohemia)	2014			Haji Springer		
Devil inside (Haji Springer ft. Bohemia)	2015			Haji Springer		
Koi Ni Parwaa (Haji Springer ft. Bohemia)	2015			Haji Springer		
Jaguar (Sukh-E ft. Bohemia)	2015			Sukh-E		
Tension Stress (Bengali) (Master-D ft. Bohemia)	2015			Master-D		
Yaaran De Siran Te (Nishawn Bhullar ft. Bohemia)	2015			Rupin Kahlon		
Akhiyaan (Tony Kakkar ft. Neha Kakkar Bohemia)	2015			Tony Kakkar		
Akhiyaan Unplugged(Tony Kakkar ft. Neha Kakkar Bohemia)	2015			Tony Kakkar		
Stolen (Sahyba ft. Bohemia)	2015			Rishi Rich		
Patola (Guru Randhawa ft. Bohemia)	2015			Preet Hundal		
Level(SunnyBoy ft. Haji Springer Bohemia)	2015			Haji Springer		
Muqabala (K. S. Makhan ft. Bohemia)	2015			Prince G		
Setti (Gippy Grewal ft. Bohemia)	2016			Jatinder Shah		
Zaalima (Waqar Ex ft. Bohemia)	2016			The Magician		
Challa (Gitta Bains ft. Bohemia)	2016			Deep Jandu		
Hathyar 2 (Gitta Bains ft. Bohemia)	2016			Deep Jandu		
Teri Kamar Pe (Tony Kakkar ft. Bohemia)	2016			Tony Kakkar		
Tamasha (Sajjad Ali ft. Bohemia)	2017			Sajjad Ali		
Weed Da Saroor (J Lucky ft. Bohemia)	2017			Deep Jandu		
Nothing (Remix) (Raxstar ft. Bohemia)	2017			DJ Harpz		
No Make Up (Bilal Saeed ft. Bohemia)	2017			Bloodline Music		
Patake (Satti Satvinder ft. Bohemia)	2017			Haji Springer		
Gold Digger (Gud Luck ft. Bohemia)	2017			Deep Jandu		
Thoddi Wala Till (Simranjeet Singh ft. Bohemia)	2017			Mix Singh		
Car Nachdi (Gippy Grewal ft. Bohemia)	2017			B Praak		
Dada Giri (Sab Bhanot ft. Bohemia)	2017			Sab Bhanot		
G Wagon (Goldy Goraya ft. Bohemia)	2017			Deep Jandu		
Mahi Aaja (Rahul ft. Bohemia)	2017			Bohemia		
Thinking About You (Sofia Chaudry ft. Bohemia)	2017			Bohemia		
Zeher (Deep Money ft. Bohemia)	2018			Deep Money		
Good Life (Deep Jandu ft. Bohemia)	2018			Deep Jandu		
Malang (Balsehri ft. Bohemia)	2018			Prince Saggu		
Woofer (Vicky ft. Bohemia)	2018			Sukh-E Muzical Doctorz		
Mai Terra Akshay (Babbal Rai ft. Bohemia)	2018			B Praak		
Unity (Karan Aujla ft. Bohemia)	2018			Deep Jandu		
Munde Mar Jaange (Raghveer Boli ft. Bohemia)	2018			Jay K		
Shoulder (Jaggi Jagowal & Karam Jeet ft. Bohemia)	2018			Laddi Gill		
Rajj Rajj Ankhiyan Roiyan (Mamta Sharma ft Bohemia)	2018			Ramji Gulati		
Manaka Da Munda (Jass Manak ft. Bohemia)	2019			Sukhe Musical Doctorz		
Assi Trendsetter (Meet Bros Ft. Bohemia)	2019			Meet Bros		
Pagol (Bengali) (Deep Jandu Ft. Bohemia)	2019			J Statik		
Khaas Bande (Gagan Kokri ft. Bohemia)	2019			Randy J		
Khatarnaak (Gippy Grewal ft. Bohemia)	2019			Desi Crew		
"Attitude" (Raman Romana ft. Bohemia)	2020			Mr. WOW		Lyrics: Deep Fateh
Sharabi Teri Tor (Jays Atwal ft. Bohemia)	2020			Shaxe Oriah		One X Artist Lyrics: Happy Raikoti
Black EyeBrow (Lucky Love ft. Bohemia & Pallavi Sood)	2020			Prabh Neeaar		Lyrics: SK Sahib
Mutiyaare Ni (Jassa Dhillon Ft. Bohemia)	2020			Gur Sidhu		Yash Raj Films & Saga Music
Kingdom (Gagan Kokri ft. Bohemia & Shree Brar)	2021			Ronn Sandhu		Saga Music
These Days (Sidhu Moose Wala ft. Bohemia)	2021	8	2	The Kidd	Moosetape	
Starboy (Jass Manak ft. Bohemia)	2021			Sharry Nexus	Bad Munda	
Mastani (Varinder Brar ft. Bohemia)	2021			Gill Saab		White Hill Music
Without You (Tere Bina) (Flint J Ft. Bohemia)	2022			Arbaz Khan		Beyond Records
Kala Tikka La Goriye (Zohaib Aslam ft. Bohemia)	2022			Arbaz Khan		Beyond Records
Punjabiyan Di Dhee (Guru Randhawa ft. Bohemia & Neeru Bajwa)	2022			Preet Hundal		T-Series
Kaliyan Raatan (Jays Atwal ft. Bohemia)	2025			Supernova Muzic		One X Artist By Jays Atwal
Reshami Rumal (Rohanpreet Singh ft. Bohemia)	2025			Mix Singh		Saga Music
"Sawal Puchdi" (Yo Yo Honey Singh ft. Bohemia)	2025			Yo Yo Honey Singh	51 Glorious Days	T-Series

=== MTV Spoken Word ===
- "Purana Wala"
- "Jaane Jana"

=== Film soundtracks ===
Year	Movie	Song	Music	Co-artist(s)	Note
2009	Chandni Chowk to China	Chandni Chowk to China (CC2C)	Bohemia	Akshay Kumar	
2009	8 x 10 Tasveer	I Got the Picture	Bohemia	J.Hind	
2009	8 x 10 Tasveer	I Got the Picture (Remix)	Bohemia	J.Hind	
2011	Breakaway	Sansaar	Sandeep Chowta		Canadian English/Punjabi film
2011	Desi Boyz	Subha Hone Na De	Pritam	Mika Singh, Shefali Alvares, Yo Yo Honey Singh	
2011	Desi Boyz	Tu Mera Hero (Subha Hone Na De)	Pritam	Mika Singh, Shefali Alvares	
2011	Desi Boyz	Subha Hone Na De (Remix)	Pritam	Mika Singh, Shefali Alvares	
2015	Faraar	Taur	Bohemia	Gippy Grewal	Punjabi film
2016	Dishoom	Subha Hone Na De (Remix)	Pritam	Mika Singh, Shefali Alvares	
2020	Street Dancer 3D	Dua Karo	Sachin–Jigar	Arijit Singh	
2020	Street Dancer 3D	Maraven Yen Adayaalam	Sachin–Jigar	Amit Mishra	Tamil Version
2020	Street Dancer 3D	O Deva Deva	Sachin–Jigar	Amit Mishra	Telugu version
2021	Bunty Aur Babli 2	Bunty Aur Babli - Title Track	Shankar-Ehsaan-Loy	Siddharth Mahadevan	
2025	Akaal: The Unconquered	Akali - Title Track	Shankar-Ehsaan-Loy	Sukhwinder Singh	
