= Rap star =

Rap star or Rapstar may refer to:

- Rap Star (TV series), a 2020 Chinese series
- "Rapstar", a 2021 song by Polo G
- Rapstar (group), an Italian hip hop duo
- Rapstar, a 2004 album by Ceza
- Da Rap Star, a 2009 album by Bohemia

== See also ==
- Rapping
