= Da Rap Star =

Studio album by Bohemia
- Released: 2009
- Genres: Hip Hop, Rap, Desi Hip Hop
- Length: 1:01:20
- Label: Universal Music India
- Producer: Bohemia

Bohemia chronology
Pesa Nasha Pyar (2006)	Da Rap Star (2009)	Thousand Thoughts (2012)

Da Rap Star is the third studio album by rapper Bohemia. It was released in 2009 under the label of Universal Music India. The album gathered a total of four nominations at the PTC Punjabi music awards and UK Asian Music Awards.

== Track listing ==
No.	Title	Length
1.	"Guess Who s Back" (Intro)	01:49
2.	"Ek Tera Pyar" (feat. Devika Chawla)	04:36
3.	"Diwana"	04:57
4.	"Eitbaar"	03:57
5.	"Gunagaar (Sinner)"	04:19
6.	"Punjabi Rap Star"	03:30
7.	"Ek Tera Pyar (Love Groove Mix)" (feat. Devika Chawla)	04:43
8.	"Ishq" (feat. Malkit Singh)	03:23
9.	"Dil" (feat. Devika Chawla)	04:59
10.	"Desi Munde" (feat. J.Hind)	02:51
11.	"Sahara Labh De" (feat. J.Hind)	03:57
12.	"Bumpin My Song" (feat. J.Hind)	04:27
13.	"Punjabi Rap Star" ((Extended Mix))	04:29
14.	"Dil Acapella" (feat. Devika Chawla)	04:56
15.	"Charso Bees (420)"	04:23
Total length:		01:01:20

== Accolades ==
Year	Nominee / work	Award	Result
2010	"Da Rap Star"	Best Punjabi Album at PTC Punjabi music awards	Nominated
2010	"Da Rap Star"	Best Sound Recording at PTC Punjabi music awards	Nominated
2010	"Da Rap Star"	Best Punjabi Music Director at PTC Punjabi music awards	Nominated
2010	"Da Rap Star"	Best International Album at UK Asian Music Awards	Nominated
