= Skull & Bones: The Final Chapter =

Studio album by Bohemia
- Released: 13 February 2017
- Genre: Desi hip hop
- Length: 40:31
- Label: T-Series
- Producer: Bohemia

Bohemia chronology
| Thousand Thoughts (2012) | Skull & Bones: The Final Chapter (2017) | Skull and Bones V2 |

Skull & Bones: The Final Chapter is the fifth studio album by rapper Bohemia. It was released in 2017 under T-Series and Bohemia's own label Kali Denali Music. The first single from the album "Zamana Jali" came out on 18 October in 2016 and the second single "Meri Jeet" released on 7 February 2017. The full album released with 10 tracks on 13 February 2017. The album topped Indian iTunes Chart within 24 hours of release. The promotional tour for the album "The Skull and Bones Tour" started in Canada and covered New Zealand, Australia and parts of Middle-East ending in Dubai.

== Track listing ==
| No. | Title | Length |
|---|---|---|
| 1. | "Zamana Jali" | 05:13 |
| 2. | "Meri Jeet" | 04:08 |
| 3. | "Dada" | 03:27 |
| 4. | "Bijlee" | 05:30 |
| 5. | "Lak Da Hulara" | 03:05 |
| 6. | "Tittli" | 03:01 |
| 7. | "Photo" | 05:15 |
| 8. | "Cadillac" | 03:34 |
| 9. | "Gol Gol" | 03:23 |
| 10. | "Nazere Mili" | 03:55 |
| Total length: | | 40:31 |
