= Randy J. Shams =

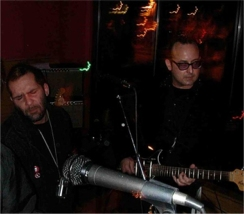
- The Tarantulas performing in 2007.

Background information
- Also known as: Randy J
- Born: Orlando, Florida
- Genres: Surf; Indie pop
- Occupation: Musician
- Instrument: Guitar
- Member of: The Tarantulas

Randy J (Randy J. Shams) is the guitarist and founder of the surf punk band The Tarantulas.

== Life and work ==
Born in Orlando, Florida, Randy J moved to Los Angeles in 1987 and shortly thereafter began composing music for film trailers and TV. After 6 years there, he moved back to Orlando and formed the surf band The Tarantulas in 1995. In early 2000, Randy J relocated to Arizona and continues to record and perform as a solo artist and with The Tarantulas.

== Major credits ==
=== Discography ===
- "Songs of the Open Land" (Randy J, 1995)
- "Monster Wave...100 Feet High" (The Tarantulas, 1999)
- "Bandidos de Rojos" (The Tarantulas 2000)
- "The Tarantulas Greatest Hits" (The Tarantulas, 2004)
- "Don't Murder Anyone...Listen to the Lovebeats" (The Tarantulas, 2006)
- "Love in a Haystack/Summertime Girl" Single (Tarantulas 2010)
- "13 Bites" (Tarantulas 2019)
- "Surf 101" (Tarantulas 2020)
- "You Got the Blues" (Tarantulas 2023)

=== Film ===
- Music for the film trailer of Unforgiven (Warner Bros, 1992)
- Music for the film trailer of Candyman (Tri-Star 1992)
- Music for the film trailer of The Vagrant (Metro-Goldwyn-Mayer, 1992)
- Music for the film trailer of Passenger 57 (Warner Bros, 1993)
- Music for the film trailer of A Perfect World (Warner Bros, 1993)
- Music for the film trailer of Surf Ninjas (New Line Cinema, 1993)
- Music for the film Banking on Heaven (2005)
- Music for the series Surf Patrol (Cornerbox Productions, 2007)
