= Next (Indian retailer) =

Next Retail India Ltd
- Industry: Retail
- Founded: 2003
- Headquarters: Jogeshwari (West), Mumbai 400 102
- Area served: India
- Products: Consumer electronics
- Parent: Videocon
- Website: www.next.co.in

Next Retail India Ltd is a subsidiary of the Videocon Industries Ltd and engages in retailing consumer electronics in India. It was founded in 2003 and currently has 600 showrooms across 25 states of India. It plans to open 400 new showrooms to increase its size to 1,000 odd retail stores by the end of the fiscal year 2010–11. In 2007 it acquired Planet M, a music and entertainment retail chain for ₹2 billion (US$21 million) from Bennett, Coleman & Co.
