= Standing ovation =

Form of applause

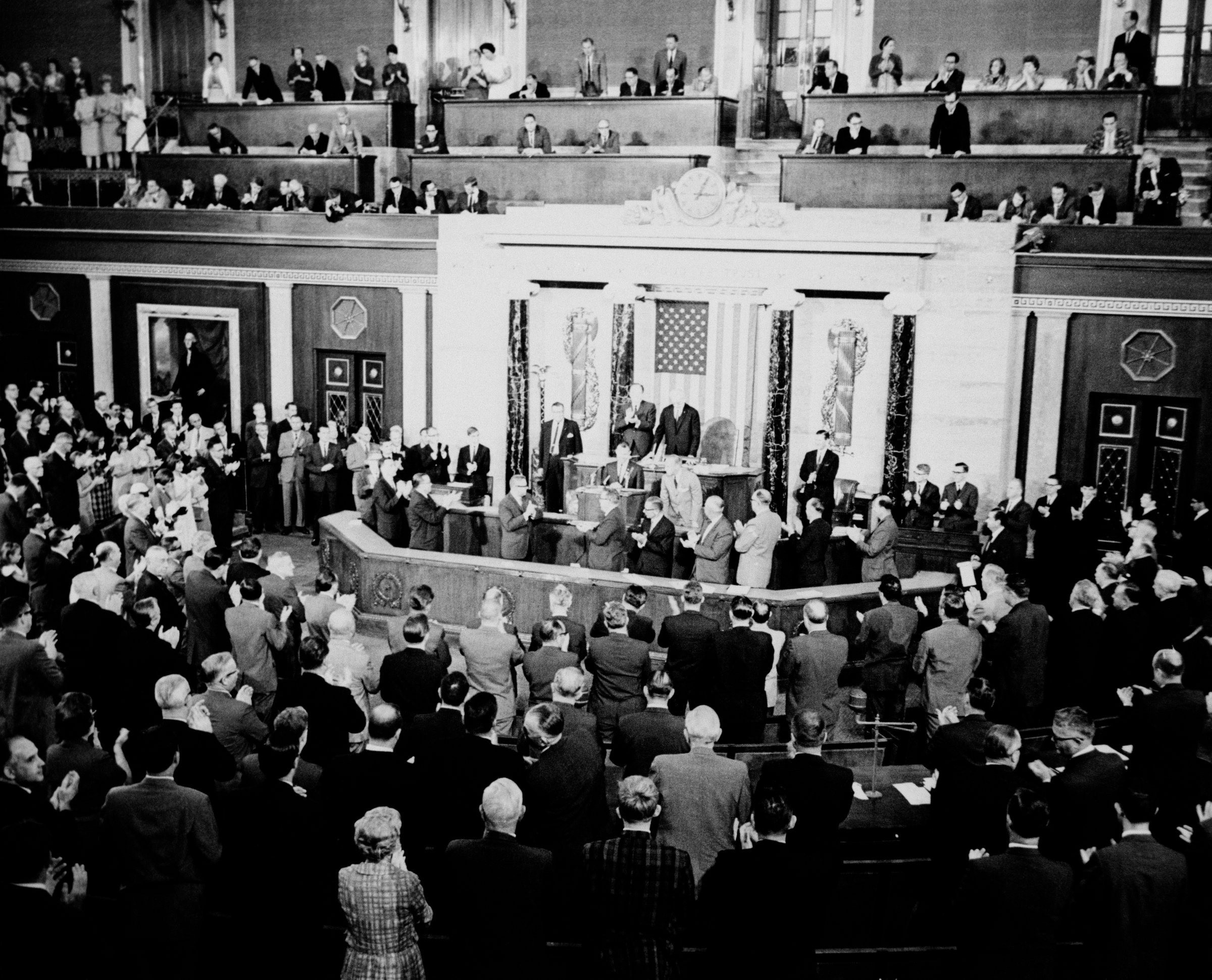
Gemini 5 Prime Crew, Astronauts Gordon Cooper and Pete Conrad, receive a standing ovation during their visit to the United States House of Representatives.

A standing ovation is a form of applause where members of a seated audience stand up while applauding, often after extraordinary performances of particularly high acclaim.

Standing ovations are considered to be a special honor. Often they are used at the entrance or departure of a speaker or performer, where the audience members will continue the ovation until the ovated person leaves or begins their speech.

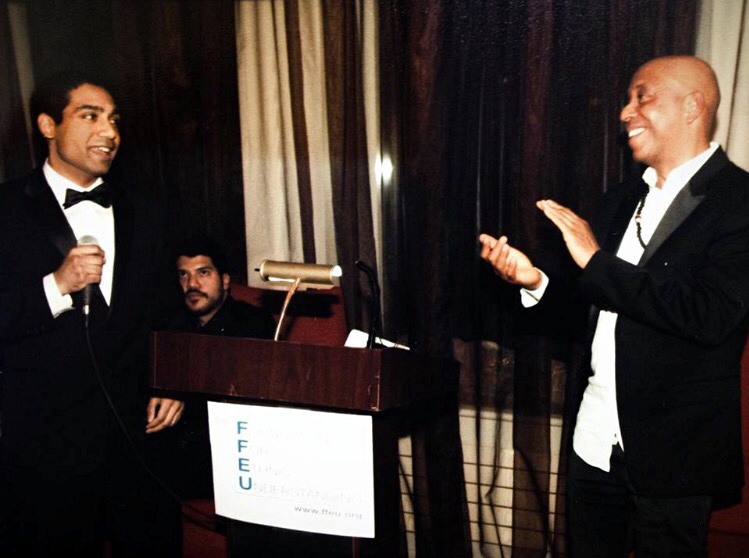
Lazarus receiving a standing ovation from Russell Simmons

Writing for The New York Times, Jesse McKinley stated that the standing ovation has come to be devalued, especially in politics, where they may be given to political leaders as a routine, rather than as a special honour in unusual circumstances. Examples include party conferences in many countries, where the speech of the party leader is rewarded with a "stage managed" standing ovation, and the State of the Union Address of the President of the United States. Furthermore, standing ovations often happen simply because of name or status, even if the performance is not worthy of such acclaim. Some examples are in politics, in which presidents receive standing ovations just for appearing, and in theater, when renowned actors receive standing ovations upon their first appearance.

== History ==
In Ancient Rome, returning military commanders (such as Marcus Licinius Crassus after his defeat of Spartacus) whose victories did not meet the requirements of a Roman triumph but which were still praiseworthy were celebrated with an ovation instead (from Latin ovatio - "to rejoice"). The word's use in English to refer to sustained applause dates from at least 1831. Standing ovations became much more common after World War II due to shifts in entertainment culture, staging design and ticket economics, as the members would commonly stand up to see the performers better and applaud them.

== In sports ==
Standing ovations are also often given in sports to reflect an outstanding performance, or to celebrate a beloved sporting hero that has a strong connection with the team's fans and home city.

This practice is especially notable among sports fans in Montreal, Quebec, Canada, where many athletes have received standing ovations exceeding several minutes long. Significant examples include:

- In 1996, Montreal Canadiens legend Maurice Richard received a 16-minute long standing ovation from the fans at the Montreal Forum following the conclusion of the Forum's final Canadiens home game as he and other Canadiens greats who played at the Forum were presented to the crowd. Richard's ovation is the longest in the history of the Forum and of the Canadiens.
- In 2002, Montreal Canadiens legend Saku Koivu returned to the Canadiens' lineup following suffering from Burkitt's lymphoma, a form of cancer. Koivu received an 8–9 minutes standing ovation from the Montreal fans prior to puck drop. It was officially listed as the second longest standing ovation in Canadiens history at the time, until it was surpassed in 2022 by the Canadiens' pre-game tribute to Guy Lafleur following the announcing of his death.
- In 2003, after Montreal Expos star player Vladimir Guerrero Sr. played his last game with the Expos, he saluted the Olympic Stadium crowd alongside his son, then three-year-old Vladimir Guerrero Jr. The two wore matching Expos uniforms and tipped their caps to the Montreal faithful as the crowd cheered.
- In 2022, following the announcing of the death of Canadiens great Guy Lafleur, the team held a tribute to him prior to the Canadiens' game against the Boston Bruins at Bell Centre. The ceremony featured highlights of Lafleur's career being played on the JumboTron and many players and coaches paying respects and saying thanks to Lafleur. The fans in attendance then stood to applaud for 10 minutes and 10 seconds to celebrate Lafleur The ovation was officially timed as the second longest in Canadiens history, behind Maurice Richard's from 1996.
