= Devil's Night: Dawn of the Nain Rouge =

2019 American film

- Directed by: Sam Logan Khaleghi
- Written by: Sam Logan Khaleghi; Aaron Herman Russman
- Based on: Nain Rouge
- Produced by: Sam Logan Khaleghi
- Starring: Jesi Jensen; Nathan Kane Mathers; Sam Logan Khaleghi; Jerry Narsh; Grover McCants; Andrew Dawe Collins; Ammar Nemo; Keyna Reynolds; Dennis Marin; John C. Forman; Judy Stepanian; Nepoleon Duraisamy; Swifty McVay
- Music by: Michael Tremante
- Distributed by: Cinedigm Entertainment Group
- Release date: November 17, 2019 (Novi, Michigan)
- Running time: 95 minutes
- Country: United States
- Language: English

Devil's Night: Dawn of the Nain Rouge is a 2019 English language feature film directed by Sam Logan Khaleghi based on the creature of the same name. The film held an advance screening at the Emagine Novi Theatre in Novi, Michigan on November 17, 2019 with a nationwide USA release of June 23, 2020 on DVD and digital platforms. The film marks the debut of Eminem's younger brother Nathan Kane Mathers.

== Plot ==
A military veteran returns home and joins local law enforcement to tackle a string of cases involving a legendary demon including 17 murders and a missing Ottawa tribal knife. The film depicts the Nain Rouge as a “ruthless guardian angel” who can be summoned by whomever holds an ancient Ottawa Indian tribe knife that is stolen from a museum.

== Cast ==
- Jesi Jensen as Billie Jean Finnick
- Nathan Kane Mathers as Detective Liam O'Connor
- Grover McCants as Detective Nightingale
- Swifty McVay as the Mayor Flynn
- Napoleon as Dr. Kadhir
- Jerry Narsh as Chief Romano
- Sam Logan Khaleghi as Marcellus Thibeaux
- Judy Stepanian as Anna Lee
- Andrew Dawe Collins as Cal
- John C. Forman as Pastor Wilhem
- Ammar Nemo as Detective Sammie Alayobi (Note: Despite his character's first name being revealed, he is listed in the credits by its last name only.)
- Kenya Reynolds as Brie
- Dennis Marin as Ike Bruce
- Rish Mitra as Raj Dilal (Note: Despite his character's last name being revealed, he is listed in the credits by its first name only.)
- Angelina Ebegbuzie as Rochelle Winston

== Production ==
The film began production when director Sam Logan Khaleghi expressed interest in making a film based on the Nain Rouge, a mythical creature of a lore which is popular in Detroit. Shooting started in 2018 in Detroit and Lake Orion, Michigan; featuring prominent Detroit locations such as the historic Packard Automotive Plant, Fisher Auto, the Michigan Central Station, the Renaissance Center station, and the Detroit Historical Museum. This film marks the acting debut of Eminem's younger brother, Nathan Kane Mathers. Former Lake Orion Police Chief Jerry Narsh appears in the film, alongside Oakland County Sheriff Mike Bouchard and Fox News 2 anchors Jay Towers & Amy Andrews. Platinum recording artist Swifty McVay, of the hip hop group D12, played the role of the mayor of Detroit and composed the song “Scariest Thing" for the film.

== Soundtrack ==
Devil's Night: Dawn of the Nain Rouge (Original Motion Picture Soundtrack)

EP soundtrack by Swifty McVay
- Released: October 30, 2019
- Genre: Hardcore hip hop
- Length: 23:26
- Label: Kyyba Films
- Producer: 80 Empire; ATG; Dub Muzik; LaidBackz

Swifty McVay chronology
Underestimated Vol 1 EP (2009)	Devil's Night: Dawn of the Nain Rouge (Original Motion Picture Soundtrack) (2019)	My Brothers Keeper (2020)

Singles from Devil's Night: Dawn of the Nain Rouge (Original Motion Picture Soundtrack)
- 1. "Scariest Thing" Released: October 31, 2018; 2. "Phoney" Released: July 5, 2019; 3. "Strong Enough" Released: August 19, 2019

Devil's Night: Dawn of the Nain Rouge (Original Motion Picture Soundtrack) was released on October 30, 2019 via Kyyba Films. Composed of six songs, the extended play featured contributions from Swifty McVay, 80 Empire, Kuniva, Lazarus and Obie Trice with production handled by Dub Muzik, LaidBackz and the ATG. The album spawned three singles: "Scariest Thing" and "Phoney" with both music videos directed by Sam Logan Khaleghi, and "Strong Enough".

Track listing
No.	Title	Writer(s)	Producer(s)	Length
1.	"Scariest Thing" (performed by Swifty McVay)	Ondre Moore; Torrey Holloway; Quentin Vonzell King	DubMuzik; LaidBackz	3:20
2.	"Run 4 Your Life" (performed by Swifty McVay)	Moore	The ATG	4:25
3.	"Phoney" (performed by Swifty McVay, Obie Trice and 80 Empire)	Moore; Obie Trice; Adrian Rezza; Lucas Rezza	80 Empire	3:36
4.	"It's Coming" (performed by Swifty McVay and Lazarus)	Moore; Kamran Rashid Khan	The ATG	3:34
5.	"Strong Enough" (performed by Swifty McVay)	Moore; Ashwin T Ganesan	The ATG	4:21
6.	"Armageddon" (performed by Swifty McVay and Kuniva)	Moore; Von Carlisle	DubMuzik; LaidBackz	4:06
Total length:				23:26

== Release ==
The film was supposed to have a theatrical release, which was cancelled due to the COVID-19 pandemic. The film was eventually released on DVD and digital platforms on 23 June 2020.

== Reception ==
Carla Hay of Culture Online wrote, "There are two kinds of cheesy horror movies in this world: Movies that are so bad that they’re funny and movies that are so bad that they’re boring. Unfortunately, the moronic “Devil’s Night: Dawn of the Nain Rouge” falls into the latter category". Sean Patrick of Horror wrote, "Devil’s Night; The Dawn of Nain Rouge is bad. The question is: Is the movie so bad that it’s kind of fun? Not really". Jennie Kermode of the UK-based Eye For Film rated the film 1/5 stars and wrote, "Some viewers may find Devil's Night entertaining because of its failures, but others will feel that, like the Nain Rouge of old, it should be persuaded to keep itself hidden or driven out of town". Jim Morazzini of Voices From The Balcony wrote, "Devil’s Night: Dawn of the Nain Rouge is another film that isn’t sure of what it wants to be. It opens like a horror film and we see the creature. Then it turns into a police procedural and character study of Finnick and her guilt".
