= The Tarantulas =

US musical group

The Tarantulas are a surf guitar / rockabilly / punk band. The Tarantulas Formed in 1995 in Orlando, Florida, with Randy J Shams (also known as a film composer) on guitar and Chris Valentino on drums.

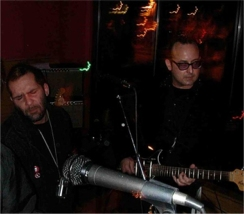
The Tarantulas 2007

== Early history ==
In the early 1990s, guitarist Randy J was performing as a solo guitarist at local coffee houses and bars in Orlando. Chris Valentino, who was already gaining a reputation as an experienced percussionist and jazz drummer, would sit in on drums and the two musicians would improvise on instrumentals during live shows.

The experimental elements of the music gradually became a backdrop for pure traditional surf guitar melodies in the style of The Lively Ones, Link Wray, Dick Dale, and The Ventures. In August 1993 Randy J began performing under The Tarantulas name and by 1995 The two musicians found a bassist, Loran Lea, to round out the band, and the trio continued performing as The Tarantulas.

== Monster Wave era ==
In 1998, Ken Baugh joined The Tarantulas on bass and recorded with the band on "Monster Wave 100 Feet High". Ken was already known as a surf guitarist with his own band, the Ten Penny Heroes. The band continued performing shows at the House of Blues in Orlando, opening shows for Link Wray, and performing shows with The Friends of Dean Martinez and Dick Dale.

The trio released Monster Wave 100 Feet High in 1999 followed by Bandidos De Rojos in 2000.

== Current recordings ==
The Tarantulas Greatest Hits..or ... The Big Sellout was released in 2004, and Don't Murder Anyone ... Listen to the Lovebeats in June 2006.

They feature drummer Eddy Barattini, vocalist Kelly Cole, and early Tarantula tracks from the original lineup in the mid-1990s.

In 2011, The Tarantulas released the singles "Love in a Haystack" and "Summertime Girl". The band members for touring and recording in 2011 were Randy J on guitar and vocals, Bill Juharos on drums, and Udi Cohen on bass.

The Tarantulas released the full-length albums "13 Bites" in October 2019 and "Surf 101" in January 2020.

"You Got the Blues" was released in September 2023 under the band name "Tarantulas". "Tarantulas" is a blues-based side project with the following musicians: Randy J Shams on Guitar, Vocals, and Bass, Bill Juharos on drums, Jim Pope on Harmonica, Diego Daniel on Vocals, Tommy Hussey on Vocals, Terry Bryant on Vocals, Richard Salem on Bass, and Wild Bill on Harmonica.

The Tarantulas are currently located in Arizona and Florida.

== Loran Lea ==
The Tarantulas original bassist, Loran Lea, died in an auto accident on January 27, 2013.

Loran played with The Tarantulas from 1995-1998. He appeared on the 1996 Tarantulas EP recorded at Full Sail University (Orlando) and on the 1997 Tarantulas EP recorded at Audio Playground (Winter Park). The songs on the first EP were: Shark Attack, Lonerider, and Demolition in Death Valley. The songs on the second EP were: Third Break from the Shore, Freakazoid Mind Warp, and Death Zone. Loran also appeared on the first live recorded version of "Bandidos de Rojos" in 1997.

Following the Tarantulas, Loran played bass for the band "Red", a popular Florida band based in Orlando. Loran was considered by many to be an excellent musician and extremely talented bassist. He died at age 40.

== Trademark ==
The Tarantulas is a registered trademark through the United States Patent and Trademark Office.

== Discography ==
=== Albums ===
- EP Self Titled (1996) Tarantulas
- EP Third Break (1997) Tarantulas
- Monster Wave...100 Feet High (1999), Richter/Tarantulas
- Bandidos De Rojos (2000) Tarantulas
- Tarantula's Greatest Hits or...The Big Sellout (2004), Tarantulas
- Don't Murder Anyone...Listen to the Lovebeats (2006) Tarantulas
- 13 Bites (2019) Tarantulas
- Surf 101 (2020) Tarantulas
- You Got the Blues (2023) Tarantulas
