= Nain Rouge =

Legendary creature of the Detroit, Michigan, area

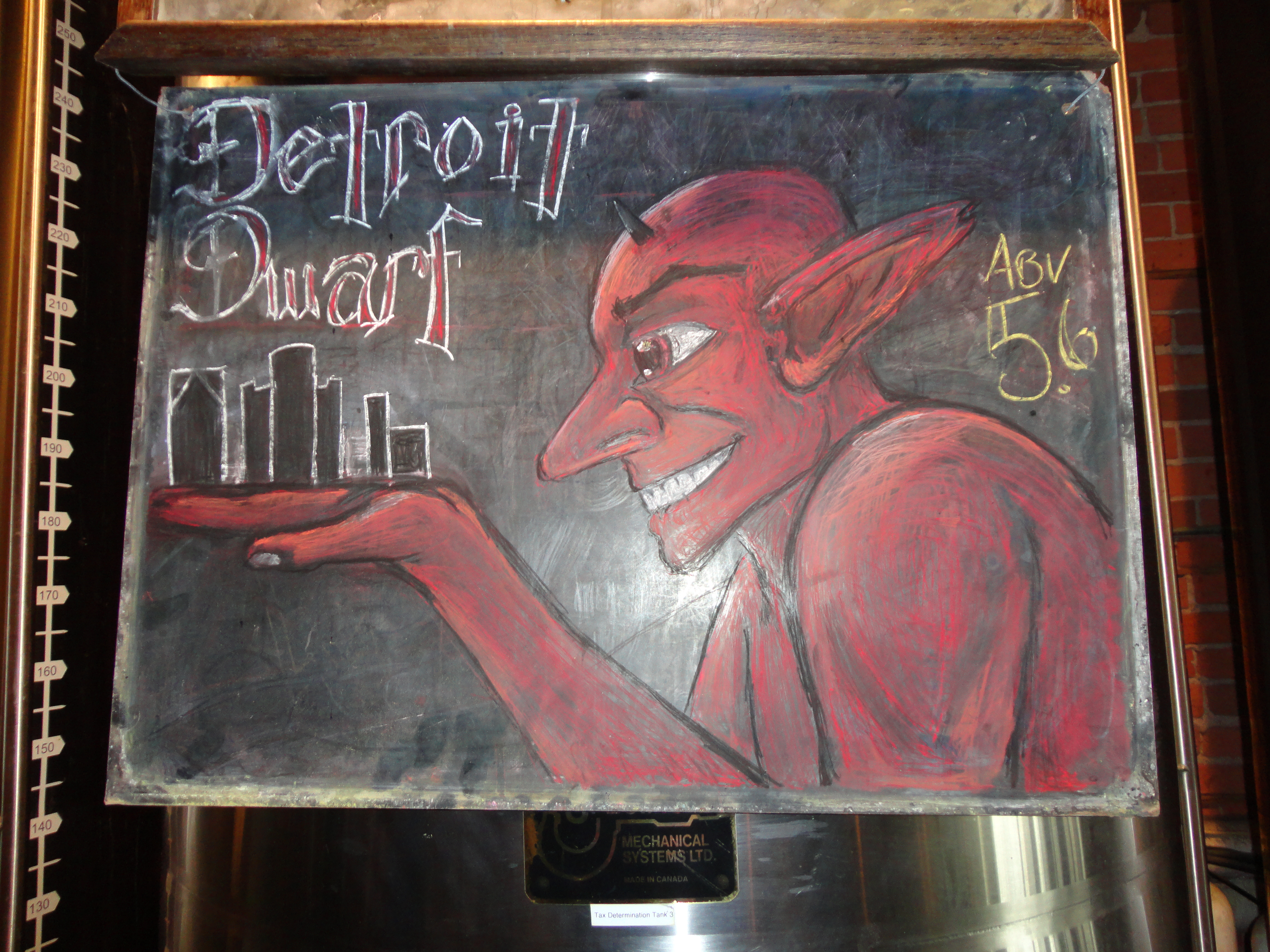
Representation of Nain Rouge used to promote Detroit Beer Company "Detroit Dwarf" lager.

The Nain Rouge (French for "red dwarf") is a legendary creature of the Detroit, Michigan area whose appearance is said to presage misfortune for the white settlers of the area. There are no records that indicate the legend of the Nain Rouge existed prior to the 1880s.

According to various narratives surrounding the figure, Detroit's founder Antoine de la Mothe Cadillac was told by a fortuneteller to appease the Nain Rouge, but he instead attacked it with his cane and shouted, "Get out of my way, you red imp!" As a consequence, a string of bad luck befell Cadillac; he was charged with abuse of power and reassigned to Louisiana, later returning to France where he was briefly imprisoned and eventually lost his fortune. The Nain Rouge is also known as "the Demon of the Strait."

The Nain Rouge legend has become part of contemporary Detroit culture. There are several alcoholic drinks named after the Nain Rouge, and the legend has been the basis for the film Devil's Night: Dawn of the Nain Rouge and a series of multiple artworks by Eric Millikin. Each Spring, there is an event called the Marche du Nain Rouge where hundreds of people chase a person dressed as the Nain Rouge out of the city and then burn the Nain Rouge in effigy.

== Legend ==
The Nain Rouge first appeared in Marie Caroline Watson Hamlin's 1883 book Legends of Le Détroit, where she described the Nain Rouge as a dwarf, "very red in the face, with a bright, glistening eye," and with "a grinning mouth displaying sharp, pointed teeth". The Nain Rouge was then included in Charles M. Skinner's 1896 book Myths And Legends Of Our Own Land, described as "a shambling, red-faced creature, with a cold, glittering eye and teeth protruding from a grinning mouth."

The creature is said to have appeared on July 30, 1763 before the Battle of Bloody Run, where 58 British soldiers were killed by Native Americans from Chief Pontiac's Ottawa tribe. Supposedly, the Nain Rouge "danced among the corpses" on the banks of the Detroit River after the battle, and the river "turned red with blood" for days after. According to the tale, all the misfortunes of Governor and General William Hull leading to the surrender of Detroit in the War of 1812 are blamed on the Nain Rouge.

Several sightings were later reported during the 20th century. Two utility workers claimed to have seen the creature just before the 1967 Detroit riots, and supposedly, it was also seen before an ice storm in 1976.

There are no records that indicate the legend of the Nain Rouge existed in the 18th century, when Antoine de la Mothe Cadillac was in authority in Detroit. The earliest record, Hamlin's Legends of Le Détroit, wasn't published until 1883, 180 years after Cadillac was said to have been cursed by the Nain Rouge. However, some claim that it originates in the early 1700s French settlement of Detroit, supposedly deriving from Norman French tales of the lutin, a type of hobgoblin. Some also claim that the Nain Rouge originated with supposed Native American legends of an "impish offspring of the Stone God".

Wellesley College assistant professor Kate Grandjean, a specialist in early American and Native American history, says "My personal feeling is it's really not quite as simple as just European colonists appropriating some Native American spirit ... I think, and it seems to be demonstrable in the historical record, that the Nain that we know in Detroit today probably has both French and Native traditions sort of wrapped up in it."

Grandjean says the Nain Rouge is a defender of sorts for “those on the losing end of history ... Historically, the Nain Rouge has mostly been a menace to those in power.”

== Local culture ==
The Nain Rouge legend has become an enduring part of the folklore of the Detroit area.

=== Marche du Nain Rouge ===
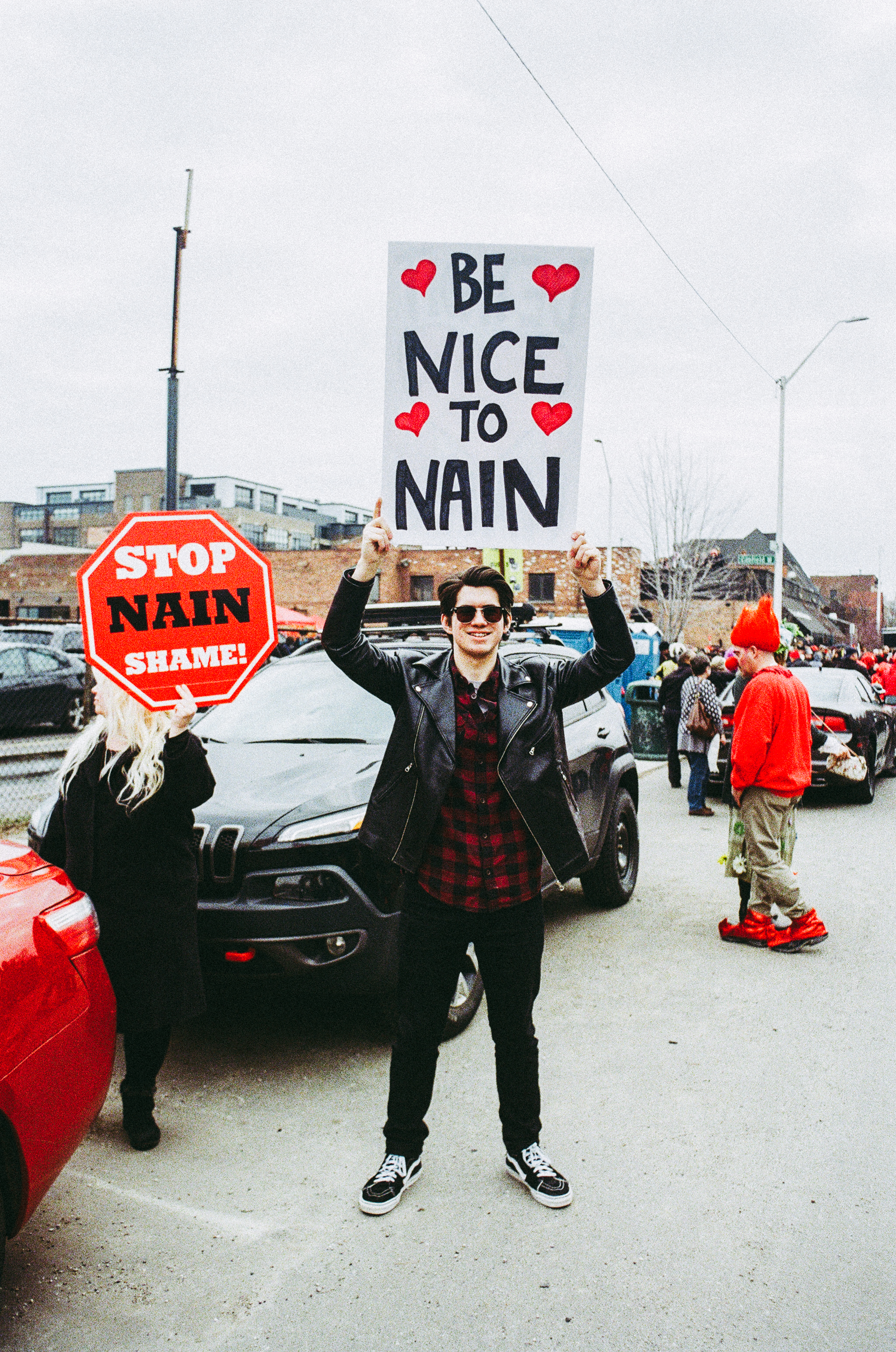
"Pro-Nain" protesters at the 2019 Marche du Nain Rouge.

Each Spring since 2010, a costumed parade called the Marche du Nain Rouge has been held in Detroit, in which a person dressed like the Nain Rouge is chased out of the city. An effigy of the Nain Rouge is then burned, in what the organizers describe as "banishing the evil spirit from the city for another year". The parade participants wear masked costumes, supposedly so the Nain Rouge will not recognize them.

Critics have protested the banishment parade, arguing that the Nain Rouge is being unfairly blamed for the city's problems, and no one should be banished from the city, particularly those who have been there the longest and who are being targeted based on the color of their skin. One protester has said "Originally the Nain Rouge was a Native American Earth spirit, a protector of Detroit. They turned him into a devil."

Hundreds of people attend the event. The 2014 parade included a speech from Alexis Wiley, a representative for Mayor Mike Duggan, the first white mayor of the majority-black city since the early 1970s.

=== Nain Rouge alcoholic drinks ===
According to Watson Hamlin's Legends of Le Détroit, the Nain Rouge's curse on Cadillac was in part a response to Cadillac's damaging effects of selling of alcohol to the local Native Americans. in Hamlin's telling of the story, the fortune teller warns Cadillac that "selling liquor to the savages ... will cause you much trouble and be the cause of your ruin." Several contemporary businesses sell alcoholic drinks based on the legend of the Nain Rouge. Detroit Beer Company, a brewpub in Downtown Detroit, has as its signature brew a "Detroit Dwarf" lager, named in honor of the Nain Rouge. In 2014, Two James Spirits released a 120 proof Absinthe du Nain Rouge. In 2015 Woodberry Wine, a distributor and wholesaler of fine wines and Kindred Vines Import Company, an importer of French and Italian wines both based out of the Metro-Detroit area introduced "Nain Rouge Red"; a French red wine blend named after the Nain Rouge dwarf.

=== Devil's Night: Dawn of the Nain Rouge ===
Devil's Night: Dawn of the Nain Rouge is a 2019 film directed by Sam Logan Khaleghi. The film marks the debut of Eminem's younger brother Nathan Kane Mathers. Swifty McVay, of the hip hop group D12, played the role of the mayor of Detroit and composed the song “Scariest Thing" for the film. It had a nationwide USA release of June 23, 2020 on DVD and digital platforms. The film depicts the Nain Rouge as a “ruthless guardian angel” who can be summoned by whomever holds an ancient Ottawa Indian tribe knife that is stolen from a museum.

== See also ==
- Mothman
- Pukwudgie
- Spring-heeled Jack
