= Detroit Beer Company =

American brewpub in Michigan

Detroit Beer Co.
- Industry: Alcoholic beverage, Restaurant
- Founded: 2003
- Founder: Drew Ciora, Richard Ghersi and Mike Pelsz
- Headquarters: Detroit, Michigan, United States
- Products: Beer
- Website: http://www.detroitbeerco.com/

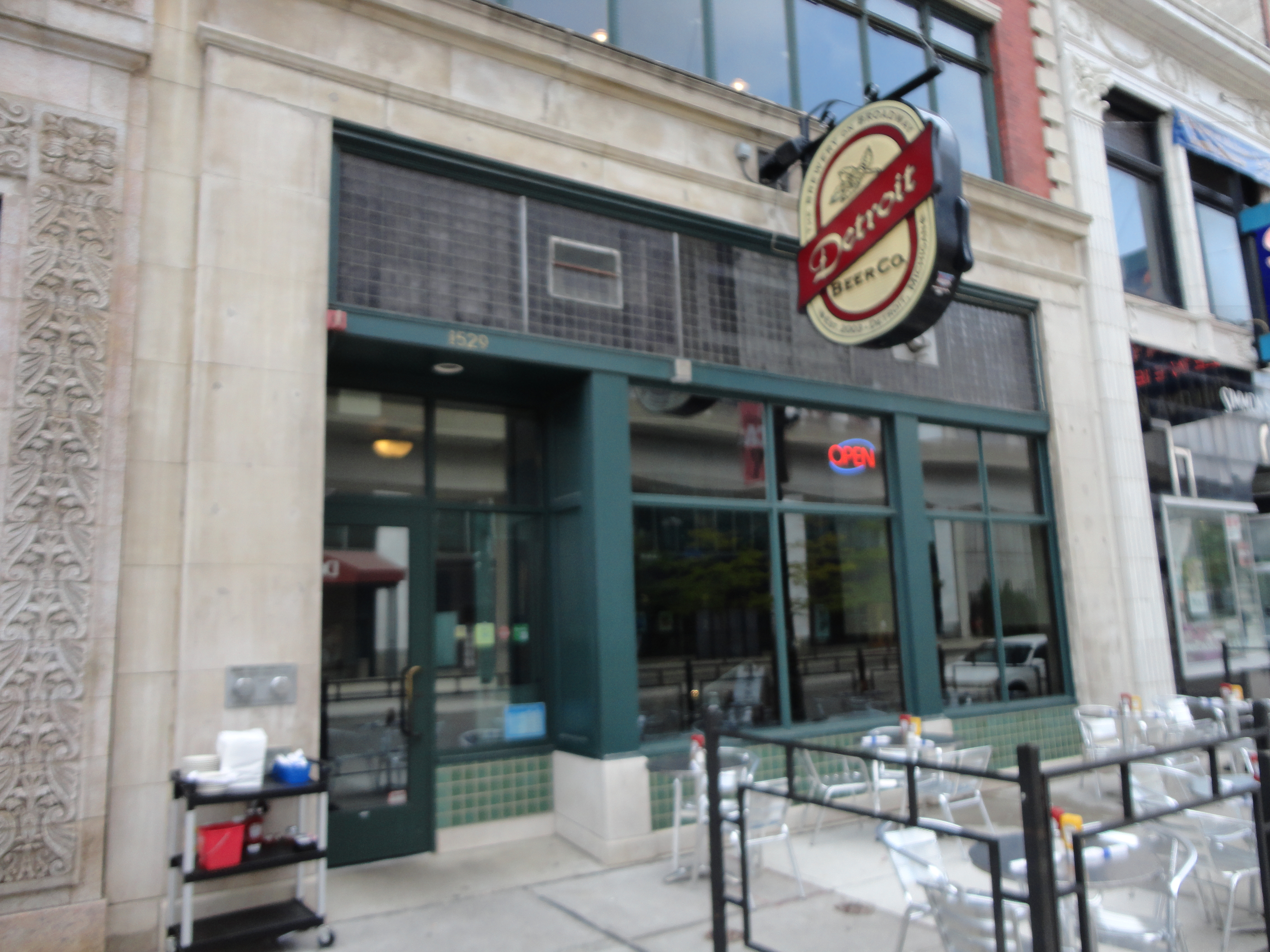
Detroit Beer Co.

Detroit Beer Co. is a brewpub located on Broadway Street in downtown Detroit, Michigan, United States. Detroit Beer Co. opened in the fall of 2003 and is part of a trio of local breweries, including the Royal Oak Brewery (1995) and the Rochester Mills Beer Co. (1998). The Detroit Beer Co. was launched by Drew Ciora and Mike Pelsz, who purchased and renovated the historical Hartz building at a cost of $5.3 million. The Hartz Building was an early 20th-century surgical supply store and was renovated to accommodate a restaurant, brewery equipment, office space, and a loft apartment. It is near the sports stadiums Comerica Park and Ford Field.

== History ==
Detroit Beer Co. is housed in the 100-year-old Hartz Building at 1529 Broadway Street; it is part of the Broadway Avenue Historic District located on a single block along Broadway Avenue between Gratiot and East Grand River. The Hartz building is in the center of a cultural and sporting spot in Detroit, with the Detroit Opera house, Comerica Park and Ford Field nearby. The six-story Hartz building was built in 1902; it was named after J. Frederick Hartz, who was Chairman of the Board of the J.F. Hartz Company, a medical and surgical supply company. Malcomson & Higginbotham, architects, 1902. J. Frederick Hartz, the namesake of this building, was Chairman of the board of the J.F. Hartz Company, suppliers of medical supplies and surgical instruments for physicians, nurses, hospitals and sick rooms. Malcomson and Higginson, architects, were issued the building permit for the construction of the building for Hartz. It was to cost an estimated $15,000.

In the early 2000s the Hartz building underwent a renovation by Kraemer Design Group with the Detroit Beer Co. in mind; the building also has mixed-use functions. The Kraemer Design Group planned a brewery and pub in the basement, first and second floor, loft offices on the third, fourth and fifth, and finally a loft apartment on the sixth floor. In 2012, Kraemer Design Group said the building was being considered for a listing on the National Register of Historic places.

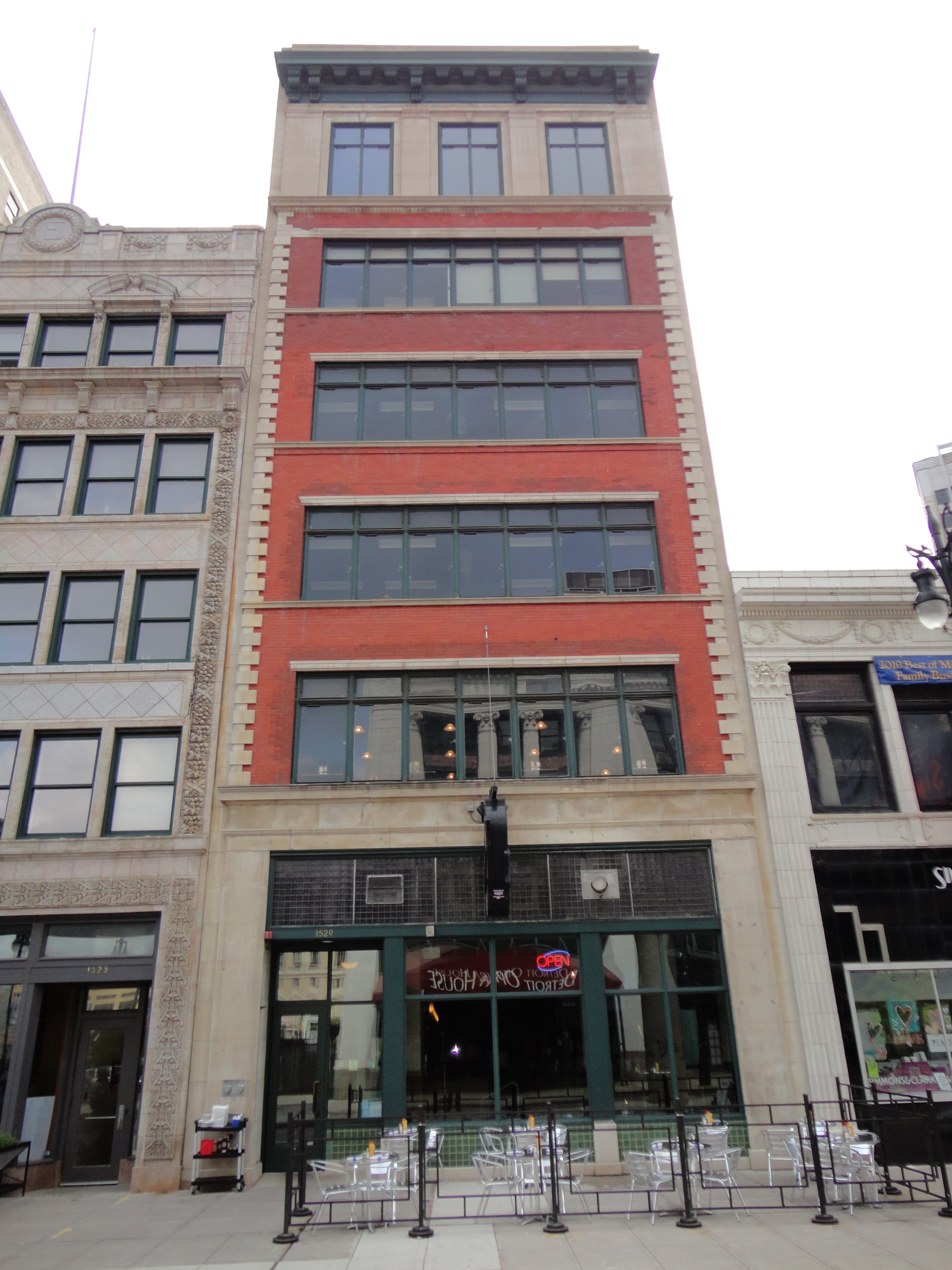
Front of Hartz Building

== The Beer ==
Detroit Beer Co. has ales and lagers that are brewed on-site. The brewhouse was constructed to fit the space requirements of the historic Hartz building; the basement houses four fermentation tanks. The design of the brewhouse, along with the beer delivery system, permits the brewery to offer up to 8 house beers on tap at any time. The brewmaster, Kevin Rodger, oversees the brewery operation.

Detroit Beer Co. has seven beers offered year round: Broadway Light, Detroit Lager, Detroit Red, Local 1529 IPA, and The Detroit Dwarf (a lager named after the "Nain Rouge" dwarf who haunts the city and serves as a harbinger of doom), The People Mover Porter (named after Detroit's downtown public transportation system) and Steam Tunnel Stout.

== Awards ==
At the Great American Beer Festival, the Detroit Dwarf took the bronze in the category of "Beer with Yeast" in 2004 and gold in the category "Düsseldorf Alt" in 2008. The Detroit Lager won bronze for "Bohemian Pilsener" in 2007. Head Brewer Justin Riopelle and Assistant Brewer Richard Chesstnutt took the bronze medal for Broadway Light in the American Cream Ale category in 2016.

The Detroit Dwarf also took home the silver medal for "Düsseldorf Alt" at the World Beer Cup in 2010.

At the World Expo of Beer, Lager holds a gold medal once again for "Bohemian Pilsener".

A since discontinued brew, St. Brigid's Oatmeal Stout was awarded the gold for "Oatmeal Stout" at the Michigan Beer Cup in 2004.

== Le Nain Rouge ==
The mascot for The Detroit Dwarf lager is the Nain Rouge (French for "Red Dwarf"), a fictional demon that some describe as being responsible for all of the hardships that have befallen the city of Detroit over the decades.

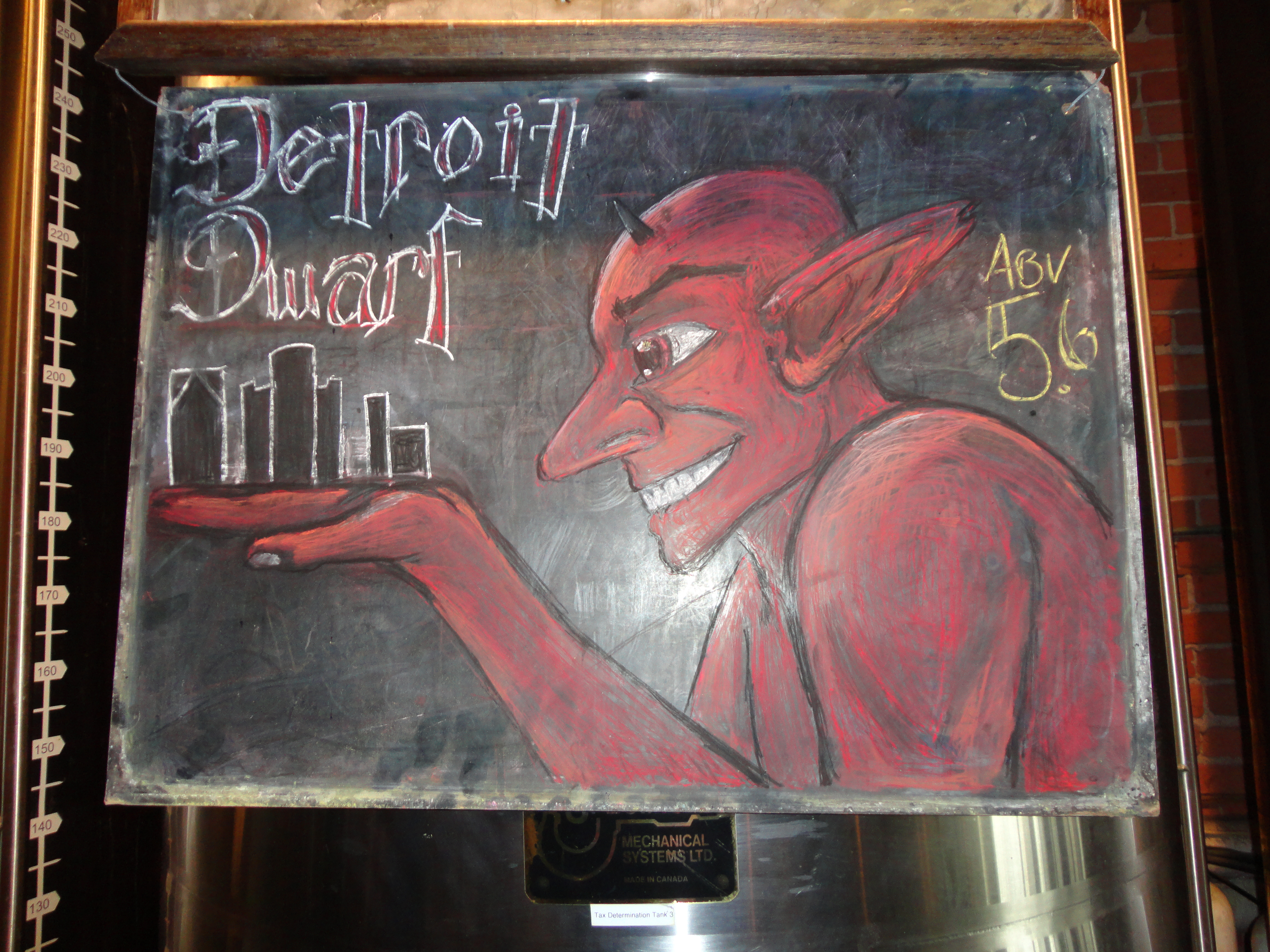
Le Nain Rouge/Detroit Dwarf
