= Devika Chawla =

Indian pop singer and songwriter

- Also known as: Devika
- Born: Devika Chawla
- Origin: India
- Genres: Pop; Indipop; Desi Hip Hop; Contemporary Sufi
- Years active: 1999 – present
- Website: devikasmusic.com

Devika Chawla, known professionally as "Devika", is a US-based singer/songwriter of Indian origin, recognized for her unique voice and soulful performances. Trained in Hindustani classical music, she is known for fusing Indian folk/classical melodies and lyrics with Western sounds.

Some of her signature tracks include "Kehnde Ne Naina", "Barkha Bahaar", and "Kothay Uttay" from her solo albums, as well as "Ek Tera Pyar" and "Dil" in collaboration with Bohemia, the Punjabi rapper.

== Early life and education ==
Devika began vocal music training in New Delhi, India, at the age of eight. She continued her training, advancing to Ragas and Hindustani classical music.

She moved to the United States to pursue her undergraduate studies in Computer Science at Georgetown University. During this time, she experimented with fusing Indian classical music with Western compositions and collaborated with Holmes Ives, providing vocals for the album titled Satyriasis. After graduation, she resumed her formal training in Hindustani classical music.

== Career ==
She has released two commercially successful solo albums: "Devika" and "Saari Raat," the latter in collaboration with Shahi Hasan from Vital Signs, Noor Lodhi, and Manesh Judge. She has also performed on various Sufi, Hip-hop, and Pop tracks, collaborating with artists including Mike Klooster of Smash Mouth, Bohemia the Punjabi Rapper and Sarod maestros Amaan and Ayaan Ali Bangash.

Her tracks have been featured on various thematic albums including Sony’s "Teri Deewani" & "Sufiaana – The Complete Sufi Experience", and Saregama’s "Colours - Sufi Ke Anek Rang," featuring renowned artists such as Ustad Nusrat Fateh Ali Khan, Rahat Fateh Ali Khan, A.R. Rahman, among others. Her rendition of the Bollywood classic "Tujhse Naraaz Nahin" was released in collaboration with Saregama Music.

She is also the first Indian vocalist to be featured on Apple’s iMovie in the Bollywood trailer. Her tracks have been featured on iTunes playlists like Love at First Sight, The A List – Indian Pop, as well as on playlists like Raga Lounge on Spotify. Her track "Jab Se Piya," created in collaboration with Holmes Ives, was remixed by Karsh Kale, Midival Punditz, Bombay Dub Orchestra and distributed by Six Degrees Records, and featured on The Buddha Bar XXIII by DJ Ravin. "Jab Se Piya”" was also submitted for Grammy consideration for the Best Global Music Performance category.

== Discography ==
- Satyriasis (Shaken Not Stirred Records, 2001) with Holmes Ives
- Devika (2007) with Shahi Hasan, Manesh Judge, and Noor Nodhi, Anshuman Chandra
- Teri Deewani (2007) a compilation with Artists including A. R. Rahman, Nusrat Fateh Ali Khan, Kailash Kher, Rabbi and Rahat Fateh Ali Khan
- Ek Kaagaz (2008) an Internet-Only advertising supported single with Pralay Bakshi and Saazmantra.
- Da Rap Star (2009) with Bohemia
- Saari Raat (2009) with Shahi Hasan, Manesh Judge, and Noor Lodhi
- Colours : Sufi Ke Anek Rang (2009) a compilation with Artists including A. R. Rahman, Nusrat Fateh Ali Khan, Rahat Fateh Ali Khan and Sonu Nigam
- Sufiaana - The Complete Sufi Experience : (2010) a compilation with Artists including A.R. Rahman, Nusrat Fateh Ali Khan, Rahat Fateh Ali Khan
- Judaiyan : (2010) a compilation with Artists including A.R. Rahman
- Javeda Sufiaana : (2010) a compilation with Artists including Kailash Kher, Rahat Fateh Ali Khan and others.
- Bijuri - The Single (2011) with Zohaib Kazi from Coke Studio Pakistan
- Lounge Nirvana (2012) a compilation with Artists including A.R. Rahman, Rahul Sharma
- Phir Ek Tera Pyar (2020) Bohemia ft Devika *(Remake of ik tera pyar - 2007)
