= Banking on Heaven =

2005 American film directed by Dot Reidelbach

- Film poster
- Directed by: Dot Reidelbach
- Written by: Laurie Allen
- Produced by: Laurie Allen
- Release date: May 28, 2005 (Zaki Gordon Institute Shorts Film Festival)
- Running time: 73 minutes
- Country: United States
- Language: English

Banking on Heaven is a documentary film which exposes the largest polygamous enclave in the United States (located in Colorado City, Arizona) and its leader, Warren Jeffs. Banking on Heaven was directed by Dot Reidelbach and written, produced, and narrated by Laurie Allen, who escaped a similar polygamous sect at age sixteen (her uncle was Ervil LeBaron).

Banking on Heaven focuses on the Fundamentalist Church of Jesus Christ of Latter Day Saints (FLDS Church), a schismatic polygamous sect of the Latter Day Saint movement that (at the time of the creation of the film) existed in Colorado City, Arizona. The documentary holds interviews with many escapees as well as those that have been excommunicated from the church. The documentary also interviews law enforcement as well as Utah and Arizona State politicians and poses questions on what can be done to rescue or help the women of the FLDS.
