= Lazarus (rapper) =

American rapper

Lazarus کامران راشد خان
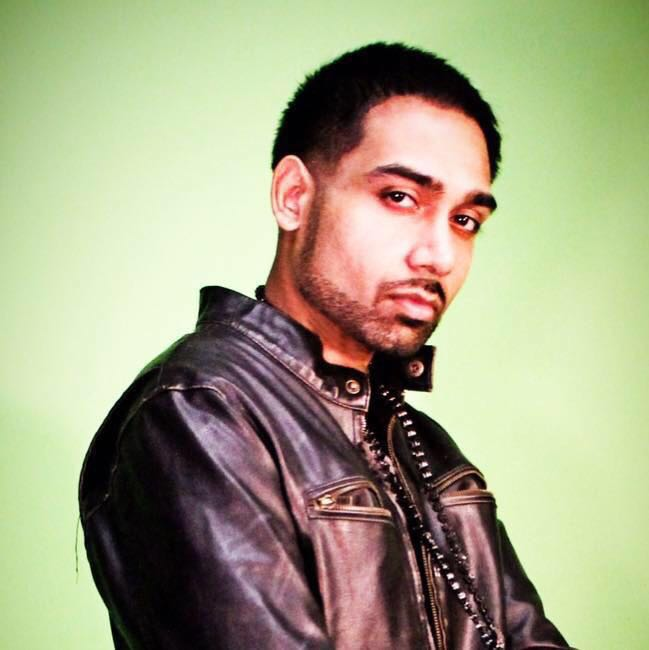
- Lazarus in November 2015

Background information
- Born: Kamran Rashid Khan; Detroit, Michigan, U.S
- Education: Wayne State University; Michigan State University
- Genre: Midwestern hip-hop
- Occupations: Rapper; songwriter; physician
- Instrument: Vocals
- Years active: 2000–present
- Labels: Laz Army; All Def Digital
- Website: lazarmyrecords.com

Kamran Rashid Khan, known professionally as Lazarus, is an American rapper and physician of Pakistani descent. He is known for his singles "GODFLOW", "Break The Walls" and "Man On A Mission" along with his songs "Drug of Choice", "Open Heart Surgery", "Underdog", "MTBK" and "Decapitation Chamber" featuring Nusrat Fateh Ali Khan, Bizarre, Royce da 5'9", Bohemia and Ghostface Killah respectively.

== Early life ==
Khan was born in Detroit, Michigan to a Muslim family from Pakistan. He attended Wayne State University where he received a bachelor's degree in Biological Sciences and subsequently Michigan State University College of Osteopathic Medicine where he studied medicine and obtained his medical degree in 2010. He further specialized in hospital medicine.

== Career ==
=== 2000–05: Career beginnings ===
While studying medicine, Lazarus simultaneously built a career in hip hop. He started rapping without a stage name but later changed his name to Lazarus due to hate crimes and racial stereotyping. He told in an interview to The Source magazine that after 9/11 he felt that his chances of becoming a rapper were finished and that his stage name metaphors Lazarus of Bethany, a biblical character who was resurrected from the dead.

Lazarus started freestyle rapping on radio stations in Detroit. He won many rap battles on FM 95.5 and FM 105.9. His singles were also played on FM 98. Lazarus then started making mixtapes and performing at venues in Detroit including opening up for G-Unit and D12. In 2005, he was interviewed by Discovery Channel and was featured in the documentary titled "The Real 8 Mile," which was hosted by Charlie LeDuff.

=== 2007–11: Debut album and mixtape ===
Lazarus released his debut album Chapter One: The Prince Who Would Be King in 2007 which led to receive him three nominations "Lyricist of the Year", "Song of the Year" and "Artist of the Year" at the 2007 Detroit Hip Hop Awards. The album had 18 tracks including a featured track with Royce da 5'9". The album spawned the single "Let the Game Know". The single received over a million views on YouTube and its music video was directed by Anthony Garth. Another music video of the single "Drug of Choice" from his mixtape Lazarus Story (2010) received worldwide coverage and also gained over a million views on YouTube. It was filmed in Rawalpindi, Pakistan.

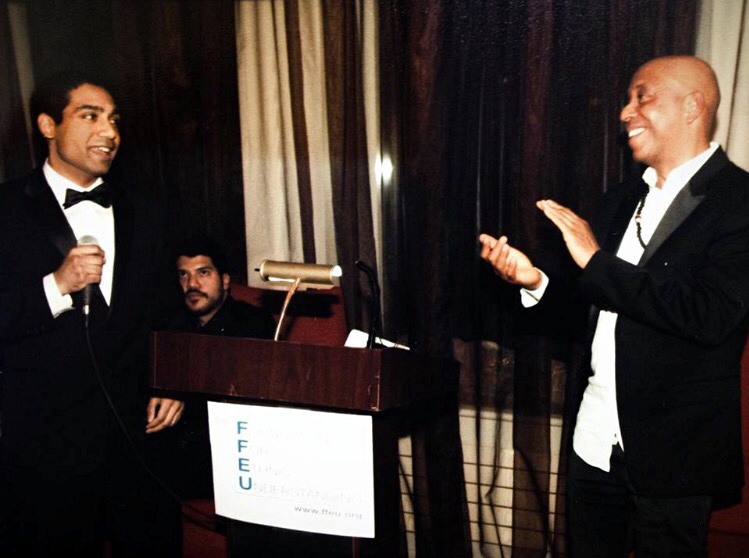
Lazarus receiving a standing ovation from Russell Simmons in March 2013

=== 2013–2015: All Def Digital and collaborations ===
In 2013, Lazarus signed to Russell Simmons' YouTube multi-channel network All Def Digital and in 2014 he released the single "Open Heart Surgery" featuring D12's rapper Bizarre. It won the award for "Song of the Year" at the 12th Underground Music Awards in New York City. Lazarus then released his single "Underdog" featuring Royce da 5'9" in July 2015. The track was introduced by Chuck D of Public Enemy. In October 2015, he opened up for Ludacris at his concert in Dallas, Texas. He was also featured on the song "Raw As It Gets" from D12's 2015 mixtape Devil's Night. The mixtape was introduced by Eminem and promoted by Shady Records.

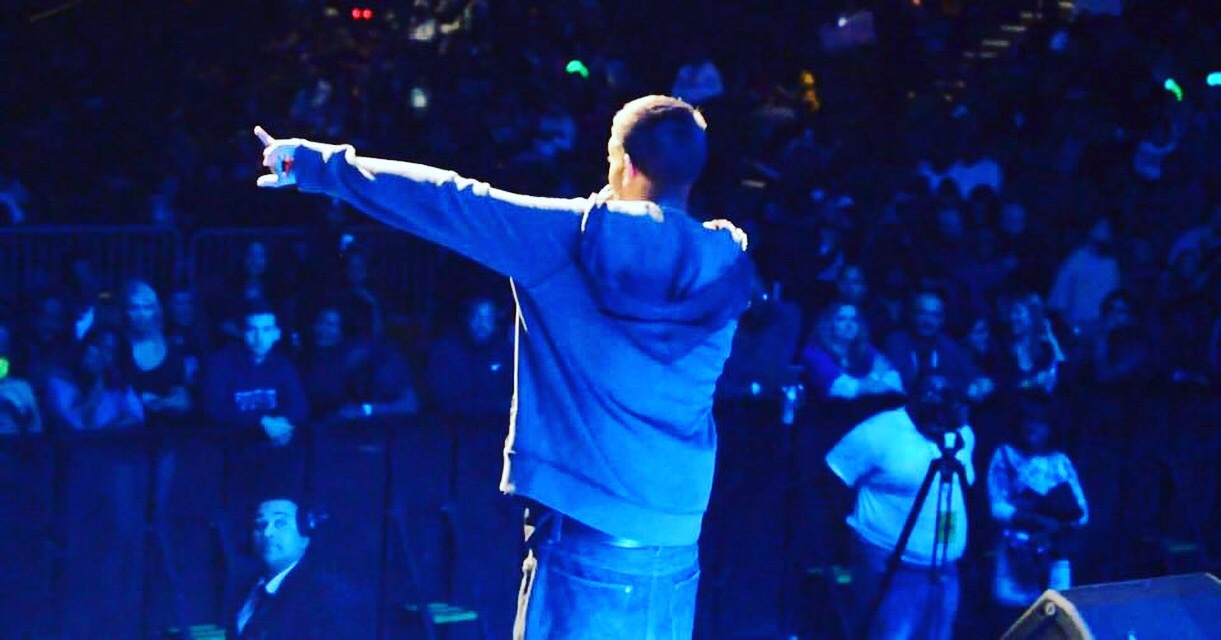
Lazarus performing at Dr. Pepper Arena in October 2015

=== 2016–2018: Laz Army Records ===
In January 2016, Lazarus released the track "Fearless" featuring Crooked I in which he criticized Donald Trump. The song included the verse: "Donald wants my arm embedded, Muslims cannot stay here. Now I'm feeling like a mutant but am I Magnus or Xavier?" In an interview with Examiner.com, he said regarding this verse: "It's like the comic book X-Men. As silly as it may sound, Muslims are the new mutants of today's society. Senator Kelly in the X-Men and Donald Trump are basically saying the same thing. There is supposed violence taking place by Muslims somewhere, now we must propose a ban on them all." Lazarus released the music video of "Underdog" featuring Royce da 5'9" in February 2016 under All Def Digital. The music video of "Raw As It Gets" from D12's mixtape Devil's Night was released in August 2016.

In January 2017, Lazarus and Punjabi rapper Bohemia released their collaborative track "MTBK" ("Mundian To Bach Ke") featuring Deep Jandu and Shaxe Oriah. The single was produced by Kali Denali Music as a tribute to the late Labh Janjua and its music video crossed 4 million views on YouTube. His next single "Man on a Mission" produced by Dub Muzik was released in August 2017. DesiHipHop.com reviewed it positively saying "Lazarus just dropped his most creative song to date." The music video for the song was produced, edited and directed by Lazarus himself. It was released under his independent record company Laz Army Records and reached over a million views on YouTube. Lazarus toured Pakistan in October 2017 and then released his next video "Pakistan" in November 2017 in which he rapped about the country in the Urdu language and dedicated it to the well renowned Pakistani poet Allama Iqbal on his birthday. In December 2017, Lazarus celebrated the 10 year anniversary of his highly received 2007 track "GODFLOW" by releasing a music video for it. The video was shot in Lahore, Pakistan and produced by the visual effects team of Muhammad Shah. The song featured 100 bars of lyrics and was produced by Alpha-Bet. It was released on New Year's Eve under Laz Army Records and attained over a million views on YouTube on its first week of release.

In March 2018, Lazarus was featured on the track "Raindrops" alongside Royce da 5'9", Obie Trice and Swifty McVay of D12 on the mixtape No Parachute. The song was produced by Dub Muzik and introduced by Chuck D. Then in July 2018, Lazarus dropped the song "Decapitation Chamber" featuring Ghostface Killah of the Wu-Tang Clan. The song was produced by Rebel of KhanArtists and introduced by Chuck D. Lazarus toured with Ghostface Killah in Canada to perform the single. The song was also awarded a plaque for having reached 5 million downloads off the Wu-Invasion Mixtape it was featured on hosted by Ghostface Killah and DJ Symphony. In August 2018, Lazarus performed alongside Swifty McVay of D12 and Obie Trice in Pontiac, Michigan to promote the soundtrack of Devil's Night: Dawn of the Nain Rouge. Lazarus was featured on the soundtrack on the song titled "It's Coming". Lazarus also performed on the 'Shady Gang National Tour' alongside Swifty McVay, Obie Trice and Crooked I. In October 2018, Lazarus released the music video of "Decapitation Chamber" with Ghostface Killah and then toured with him in Vancouver, Canada and San Francisco, California. He then toured with the collective Wu-Tang Clan in Washington DC and Boston, Massachusetts followed by concerts in Australia and New Zealand. The music video of "Decapitation Chamber" crossed over a million views on YouTube.

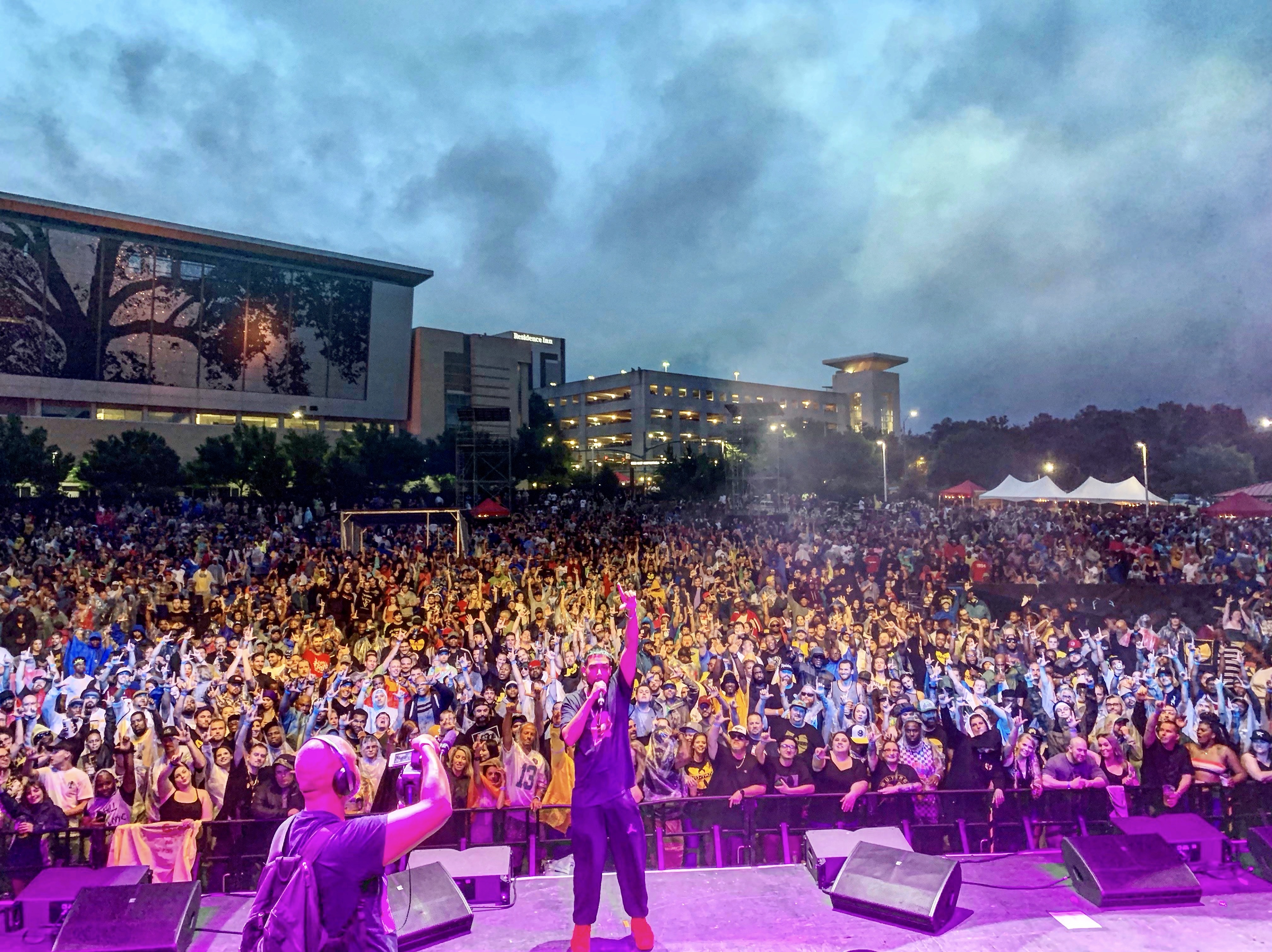
Lazarus performing at Red Hat Amphitheater in June 2019

=== 2019-Present: Wu-Tang Clan tour and treating COVID-19 ===
In January 2019, Lazarus was interviewed on 50 Cent's radio station ThisIs50 by DJ Thoro. He then opened up for Wu-Tang Clan on 2 sold-out shows in Philadelphia followed by 2 sold-out shows in New York City which were hosted by Funkmaster Flex. He continued touring with Wu-Tang Clan in Detroit, Cleveland, Raleigh, Seattle and Tucson. In July 2019, Lazarus was interviewed on Eminem's radio station Shade 45. He was then featured by Bizarre on the song "Leatherface" alongside King Gordy & Hopsin which was released on Halloween.

In January 2020, Lazarus released his single "You Already Know" featuring Rick Ross & Gucci Mane. He then went on a US tour with GZA of Wu-Tang Clan. In February 2020, Lazarus released his single "Break the Walls" featuring female vocalist Legha. The song was aimed at uniting people of all ethnicities and racial backgrounds. It was produced by Dr Zeus and received over 2 million views on YouTube. In April 2020, Lazarus was interviewed by DJ Vlad on VladTV to discuss his experiences as a physician on the front lines of combating COVID-19 at his hospital in Las Vegas. In May 2020, he was interviewed by DJ Vlad again and also appeared on the song "Fit In" by 80 Empire which also featured Fred the Godson & Bishop Lamont. In September 2020, Lazarus released his single "Medical Marijuana" featuring Redman in which he rapped about the medical benefits of cannabis.

In January 2021, Lazarus was featured by Locksmith on the lyrical back and forth anthem "Signs." After the song was released, Lazarus was interviewed by Fat Joe on his podcast The Big Big Show. He was also featured on Cassidy's album Da Wiseman on the song "Can't Do It Alone." The video for this song was premiered on Worldstar and received over a million views. Lazarus then released his full Urdu track "Qatal" and "Bande Kharab" featuring 10-year-old Pakistani rapper Kaky Thou$and on Laz Army Records. In August 2021, Lazarus dropped the theme song for WWE wrestler Jinder Mahal for his SummerSlam 2021 PPV match up.

== Awards and nominations ==
Year	Nominee / work	Award	Result
2015	Open Heart Surgery	Underground Music Award for 'Song of the Year'	Won
2015	Lazarus	Underground Music Award for 'Artist of the Year'	Nominated
2023	Pale Blue Dot	First Song to Premiere from Outer Space; Inducted in U.S. Library of Congress	
2025	Not To Be Defined	Grammy Award Consideration for 'Best Rap Song'	
2026	Lazarus	FHM Pakistan Game Changer Award for 'Best Rapper'	Won

== Discography ==
=== Albums ===
Year	Title
2007	Chapter One: The Prince Who Would Be King
2010	Lazarus Story

=== Singles ===
Year	Song	Featured Artist	Producer
2007	"Let The Game Know"		Alpha-Bet
2011	"Drug of Choice"	Nusrat Fateh Ali Khan	Mast
2011	"Too Much Pride"	Stretch Money	Alpha-Bet
2014	"Lay The Law Down"	Swifty McVay, Kuniva	I.V. Duncan
2014	"Open Heart Surgery"	Bizarre	Rooq
2016	"Underdog"	Royce da 5'9"	Ollie
2016	"Fearless"	Kxng Crooked	DJ DDT
2017	"Man On A Mission"		Dub Muzik
2017	"Pakistan"		Ghauri
2017	"GODFLOW"		Alpha-Bet
2018	"Decapitation Chamber"	Ghostface Killah	Rebel of KhanArtists
2020	"You Already Know"	Rick Ross, Gucci Mane	Tez
2020	"Break The Walls"	Legha	Dr Zeus
2020	"Medical Marijuana"	Redman	Shawn Ski
2020	"Trap City"		Kyyba Films
2021	"Qatal"		Harm Sandhu
2021	"Bande Kharab"	Kaky Thou$and, Asif Balli	Lil AK 100
2021	"Maharaja"	Raftaar, Manj Musik, Sikander Kahlon	Manj Musik
2022	"GOAT"		Yo Yo Honey Singh
2023	"Pale Blue Dot"		Profit
2023	"Scalpel"		Mr. Porter
2024	"God Sent Me"		Fredwreck
2025	"One For The Ages"		Dr Zeus
2025	"Not To Be Defined"	Rakim	Dem Jointz
2026	"Dr. Jekyll & Mr. Hyde"	Royce da 5'9", Ikka	Shawn Ski
2026	"DEATHBLOW"	Swifty McVay	Stan Da Man
2026	"TROLL KILLER"		Dem Jointz, Andray Higgins
2026	"JHOOTE KA JANAZA"		Kaky Thou$and

=== Guest appearances ===
Year	Song	Artist	Album
2015	"Raw As It Gets"	D12	Devil's Night
2017	"MTBK"	Bohemia, Deep Jandu, Shaxe Oriah	
2017	"Infinity Gems"	Rebel of KhanArtists, R-Mean, Tragedy Khadafi, Radamiz, Chris Rivers, A-F-R-O	
2018	"No Parachute"	Swifty McVay	No Parachute
2018	"Raindrops"	Royce da 5'9", Obie Trice, Swifty McVay	No Parachute
2019	"It's Coming"	Swifty McVay	Devil’s Night: Dawn of the Nain Rouge
2019	"Leatherface"	Bizarre, King Gordy, Hopsin	Rufus
2020	"Fit In"	80 Empire, Fred the Godson, Bishop Lamont	Legacy
2020	"Prescription"	Swifty McVay	Detroit Life
2021	"Signs"	Locksmith	The Lock Sessions Vol. 2
2021	"Can’t Do It Alone"	Cassidy	Da Wiseman
2021	"Long Story Longer Cypher"	Swifty McVay, Ras Kass, MRK SX, Marv Won, Miz Korona, Planet Asia, Killah Priest, Bronze Nazareth	Long Story Longer
2021	"BOOOM"	Kidshot, Talhah Yunus	
2022	"Pakistani King"	Kaky Thou$and	
2022	"My City"	Azeem Haq, The Game, Fredro Starr, JRDN	
2022	"LOBOTOMY"	Emiway Bantai	
2024	"Pehchan Gaya"	Junaid Khan	
2024	"Shahanshah"	Kaky Thou$and	
2025	"Everybody Talkin'"	Jon Connor, Hi-Rez	
2025	"Not To Be Defined"	Rakim	The Re-Up

== See also ==
- List of Pakistani Americans
- Pakistani hip hop
