= Planet M =

Indian music retail store

Planet M Retail Ltd
- Headquarters: Mumbai, India,
- Parent: Videocon

Planet M was an Indian music retail store founded by The Times Group (BCCL). It was sold to Next Retail India Ltd. of Mumbai, the retail arm of Videocon, in November 2007. It was present in many cities (140-plus locations) all over India. These stores were mainly known for selling music and movies and related accessories. They also sold gaming consoles and handhelds like PlayStation Portable, PS2, PS3, Wii and Xbox 360. Planet M was also in the mobile retail business and sold mobile handsets.
