= Desi hip-hop =

Music Community

Desi hip hop (DHH)
- Stylistic origins: Hip hop; R&B; soul
- Cultural origins: Indian subcontinent
- Typical instruments: Bass; drum machine; sampler; synthesizer

Subgenres
- Bhangragga

Regional scenes
- Asian Underground; Indian hip-hop; Pakistani hip-hop; Bangladeshi hip-hop; Sri Lankan hip-hop; Nepalese hip-hop

Desi hip hop is a term for music and culture which combines hip-hop with desi influences; the term desi referring to the Indian subcontinent (specifically India, Pakistan and Bangladesh).

== Overview ==
The launch of Bohemia's second album Pesa Nasha Pyar (2006), whose tracks such as "Kali Denali", "Kurti" and "Sahara" became big hits, generated a new-found interest in rap songs performed in desi languages during the early 2000s. This form of hip-hop became known in the early 1990s as a subculture heavily influenced by American rap. Even though there were several occasional hits during this period, the desi hip-hop scene remained limited largely to the underground, with a very niche loyal audience. Hip-hop culture, including graffiti and b-boying started seeping into the club scene and street culture of big cities like Delhi and Mumbai. Similarly, Nepalese hip-hop has also since evolved into a cultural and political force used by the youth of Nepal to bring unity and awareness, characterized by the blending of Nepali folk music. Hip hop and rap culture in Pakistan during the 1990s and early 2000s were mainly centered around those with a good grasp of English (a socioeconomically privileged group). By the late 2000s, Punjabi rap began influencing non-Punjabi speakers to experiment with hip hop in other Pakistani languages, thus leading to new Sindhi and Pashto hip- hop scenes. Urdu rap artists struggled to make a significant impact on the country's hip-hop landscape, but they started to cultivate their own space with the rise of rappers like Faris Shafi and Talha Anjum. The Indian diaspora in America, Canada and London also saw the rise of underground rappers like Heems, Fateh, and Riz MC, among others. Anik Khan has blended Queens culture with Bengali influences into his music, and similarly, rappers Riz MC and Heems of the group Swet Shop Boys and Das Racist incorporate many South Asian influences in their music.

Also, 2017 saw a major boost in this genre through the start of rap battle culture introduced by an entertainment and music production house named 6FU. Rap battles being a culture of western countries, saw India inheriting it and witnessing its first rap battle in regional languages through 6FU's first event, Frontline, that was held in Delhi. The label started its YouTube channel in 2017 and has since given underground rappers a new hope to be heard and establish rap as a career. Started by Trouble, who hosts rap battles and cypher (freestyling) sessions, 6FU started seeing an influx of more than a dozen rappers who perform turn-by-turn on the same stage to see who has the better verses. Another big hip-hop collective, SpitDope Inc., was founded in Hauz Khas, Delhi, by rappers MC Kode, Encore ABJ, and yungsta in 2014, which organised events, especially rap battles, every weekend in Deer Park. In 2017, Los Angeles based hip-hop group, Bhanga Bangla, introduced a type of trap music that leans heavily on South Asian stories blended with trap. They went on to create a new trap movement that has sparked the attention of audiences around the world.

== Collaborations ==
Desi hip hop has crossed paths with Western hip-hop multiple times, notably when musicians from both sides of the world collaborate. American rapper Snoop Dogg has worked with different artists such as rapper Dr Zeus, Bohemia, and the band RDB. Bohemia also collaborated with hip-hop artists such as Kurupt, Sean Kingston, Iraj Weeraratne and Baby Bash & The Game. The group RDB also worked with different hip hop artists such as T-Pain and Ludacris. In 2016, rapper Badshah worked with dancehall musician Sean Paul in a song called "Move Your Body" with DJ Shadow Dubai. Desi rappers born and/or raised in the West have also bridged the cultures within their music, incorporating desi influences into their music. In 2017, Pakistani rapper Ali Kaz collaborated with WWE music producer Jim Johnston for the theme song of WWE wrestler Jinder Mahal. In 2017, Badshah also did international collaboration with Major Lazer as a commercial promotion of Tuborg Brewery.

The same year Emiway Bantai collaborated with Nigerian Canadian rapper Dax for their song "I Been That". In 2020, Emiway Bantai collaborated with the likes of Macklemore and Snoop Dogg. In January 2021, KR$NA was featured on American rapper Hi-Rez's song "Crossroads" with Royce da 5'9". Later in July, another collaboration of KR$NA with Hi-Rez was released, titled "Playground" featuring former Slaughterhouse member, KXNG Crooked. In the same year in November, KR$NA was featured along with A-F-R-O, Joell Ortiz, Bizzy Bone, Tech N9ne and Twista, on the song "Overdrive", by Hi-Rez.

In 2019, the release of the film Gully Boy, saw the commercialization of the genre in India and witnessed collaborations with Nas, the executive producer of the film and Divine and Naezy, on whom the film was loosely based. Divine would go on to be the first signee of the Indian extension of Nas's label Mass Appeal Records. During the same year, Divine collaborated with fellow Mass Appeal signee Dave East for his song "Remand", off his debut studio album, Kohinoor. Divine has also collaborated with Nas on two songs, one for the Gully Boy soundtrack, and another for his second studio album, Punya Paap.

In 2022, rapper Badshah collaborated with Colombian singer J Balvin and Puerto Rican record producer Tainy on "Voodoo", which was released on April 22, 2022 and would go on to feature on the official soundtrack for the video game FIFA 23. In July 2022, DJ Shadow Dubai, a Dubai based DJ announced a collaboration with Yo Yo Honey Singh and Lil Pump for track titled "Casanova". In August 2022, Emiway Bantai collaborated with Detroit based Pakistani rapper Lazarus for track called "LOBOTOMY", which was later deleted from YouTube due to the feud that ensued between both artists in 2026.

In April 2025, Nas visited India again to perform at the Mass Appeal Presents: The World Reunion—A Charity Concert, hosted by Mass Appeal India, at The Nesco Center, in Mumbai. He was accompanied by various Indian-origin rappers, such as, Divine, Raftaar, Ikka, KR$NA, King, and Steel Banglez. In 2026, Emiway Bantai collaborated with American rapper Token on "SADAK 2.0".

== Controversies ==
While the underground desi hip-hop scene was propelled forward through rap cyphers, it has frequently been criticized and has received backlash from the general public. Delhi rap pioneer MC Kode spoke about the obstacles he faced while organizing SpitDope in 2019, with NPR Music, where he talked about how a rap battle with a politician's son led to him receiving threats and harassment due to him questioning the politician's involvement in the Mandai massacre in Tripura.

In May 2021, Kode received death threats and faced harassment through internet doxxing when old videos of him resurfaced through an Instagram meme page, where he was seen saying extremely unsavoury things about the Mahabharata/Bhagwad Gita and the Indian Army; the former from a 6FU battle rap round from June 2016, and the latter from an Instagram Live session. Internet users started a trend to call for his arrest and offered money to even beat him up in broad daylight. On June 2, he apologized on his Instagram story, but further went missing for a week, and his story was interpreted as a suicide note, which alarmed his friends and users to call for his search. He was eventually found in Jabalpur, Madhya Pradesh.
