= List of British Indians =

This is a list of notable British people of Indian descent (British Indians).

== Historical ==
- Kumudini Basu (1873–1942), Bengali author and reformer
- Subhas Chandra Bose (1897–1945), Indian nationalist leader and politician
- Shoshi Mukhi Das (1868–1921), missionary, teacher and nurse
- Sukhsagar Datta (1890–1967), medical doctor, Indian Independence activist and Labour Party official, living in Bristol.
- Prasannamoyee Devi (1856–1939), Bengali poet and travel writer
- Sheth Ghoolam Hyder (1776–1823), British Indian professor of Persian at the East India Company College. One of the first Indians to teach in the UK.
- Kitty Kirkpatrick (1802–1889), daughter of James Achilles Kirkpatrick and a Hyderabadi noblewoman. Muse of philosopher, Thomas Carlyle.
- Bhabini Mahato (1925–2014), Bengali freedom fighter and language activist
- Dean Mahomed (1759–1851), British Indian traveller and writer originally from Patna in modern-day Bihar
- Bhagwati Bhola Nauth (born c. 1882), British Indian social reformer, activist and suffragist
- Lolita Roy (born 1865), British Indian social reformer, activist and suffragist
- Mrinalini Sen (1879–1972), Bengali writer and pilot
- Duleep Singh (1838–1893), last Maharaja of the Sikh Empire who was born in Lahore and was exiled to the United Kingdom at the age of 15
- Mohan Singh (1909–1989), British Indian military officer and politician
- Sophia Duleep Singh (1876 – 1948), daughter of Duleep Singh and suffragist in England
- David Ochterlony Dyce Sombre (1808–1851), Anglo-Indian politician held to be the first person of Indian descent to be elected in British Parliament.
- Shapurji Saklatvala (1874–1936), communist activist and British politician of Indian Parsi heritage.
- Elizabeth Sharaf un-Nisa (1758–1822), Mughal noble married into the aristocratic Ducarel family. Originally from the town of Purnea in modern-day Bihar

== Academia and medicine ==
- Jas Pal Singh Badyal, professor of chemistry, Durham University
- Sir Shankar Balasubramanian, chemist and Herchel Smith Professor of Medicinal Chemistry, University of Cambridge
- Baron Kumar Bhattacharyya, former engineer, professor of manufacturing systems at University of Warwick and founder and chairman of the Warwick Manufacturing Group
- Dinesh Bhugra, professor of mental health at King's College London, former President of the Royal College of Psychiatrists and the World Psychiatric Association, and President-elect of the British Medical Association
- Jagjit Chadha, economist, professor and Director of the National Institute for Economic and Social Research (NIESR)
- Krishna Chatterjee, professor of endocrinology, University of Cambridge
- Rangan Chatterjee, medical doctor, author, television presenter and podcaster
- Dame Pratibha Gai, microscopist, professor and Chair of Electron Microscopy, University of York
- Mukesh Kapila, diplomat, former civil servant and professor of Global Health and Humanitarian Affairs at the University of Manchester
- Dame Parveen Kumar, medical doctor, professor of medicine at Barts and The London School of Medicine and Dentistry, former President of the British Medical Association and the Royal Society of Medicine, and former vice-president of the Royal College of Physicians.
- Mayur Lakhani, medical doctor and President of the Royal College of General Practitioners
- Sir Ravinder Maini, rheumatologist, academic and professor at Imperial College London
- Yadvinder Malhi, professor of ecosystem science, University of Oxford
- Kantilal Vardichand Mardia, statistician
- Anand Menon, professor of European Politics and Foreign Affairs, King's College London
- Chaand Nagpaul, medical doctor and Chair of the Council of the British Medical Association
- Harash Narang, a microbiologist and virologist
- Baron Narendra Patel, obstetrician and former President of the Royal College of Obstetricians and Gynaecologists
- Rahul Potluri, medical doctor and epidemiologist
- Sir Venkatraman Ramakrishnan, winner of the 2009 Nobel Prize in Chemistry and President of the Royal Society
- Babulal Sethia, medical doctor, cardiac surgeon and former President of the Royal Society of Medicine
- Aditi Shankardass, clinical neuroscientist, Harvard Medical School
- Simon Singh, theoretical physicist and popular science author
- Ashok Venkitaraman, cancer researcher, director of the Medical Research Council Cancer Unit and Ursula Zoellner Professor of Cancer Research, University of Cambridge
- Sir Tejinder Virdee, professor of physics, Imperial College London.

== Arts and entertainment ==
=== Artists ===
- Sir Anish Kapoor, sculptor
- Poulomi Desai, photographer, sound artist and curator
- Siramdasu Venkata Rama Rao, painter

=== Media ===
- Naveen Andrews, actor
- Gabrielle Anwar, actress (father and grandfather had Indian ancestry)
- Mina Anwar, actor
- Ritu Arya, actress
- Simone Ashley, actress
- Samir Bhamra, theatre director
- Sanjeev Bhaskar, actor, comedian, radio commentator, Chancellor of the University of Sussex
- Alia Bhatt, actress, singer, film producer, entrepreneur, environmentalist
- Jas Binag, actor
- Gurinder Chadha, movie director
- Anya Chalotra, actress (father of British Indian ancestry)
- Ameet Chana, actor
- Narinder Kaur, broadcaster and journalist
- Charithra Chandran, actress
- Sarita Choudhury, actress (father and grandfather of British Indian ancestry)
- Emilia Clarke, actress
- Nathaniel Dass, actor
- Jasmine Dotiwala, television and radio presenter
- Gabrielle Drake, actress
- Bobby Friction, radio presenter
- Kulvinder Ghir, actor
- Mandip Gill, actress
- Neelam Gill, model
- Shobna Gulati, actor
- Krishnan Guru-Murthy, television presenter
- Waris Hussein, film and television director
- Saeed Jaffrey, actor
- Avan Jogia, actor (father was British Indian)
- Indira Joshi, actor
- Juggy D, singer
- Priya Kansara, actress
- Katrina Kaif, actress
- Viveik Kalra, actor
- Rani Khanijau, television presenter
- Ben Kingsley, actor
- Rahul Kohli, actor
- Chaneil Kular, actor
- Ismail Merchant, producer
- Jimi Mistry, actor
- Rhona Mitra, actress and model
- Neet Mohan, actor
- Naga Munchetty, television presenter and journalist
- Parminder Nagra, actress
- Kunal Nayyar, actor
- Archie Panjabi, actress
- Dev Patel, actor
- Himesh Patel, actor
- Upen Patel, model
- Aaron Phagura, actor
- Upinder Randhawa, producer, director, actor, journalist
- Anita Rani, television and radio presenter
- Soni Razdan, actress and filmmaker
- Amber Rose Revah, actress
- Laila Rouass, actor
- Sunetra Sarker, actor
- Deep Sehgal, producer
- Naomi Scott, actress
- Amit Shah, actor
- Pooja Shah, actor
- Sonali Shah, television presenter
- Babita Sharma, television presenter
- Luke Thompson, actor
- Indira Varma, actor

=== Comedians ===
- Nish Kumar, comedian
- Paul Chowdhry, comedian
- Sanjeev Bhaskar, comedian
- Nina Wadia, comedian
- Meera Syal, comedian
- Danny Bhoy, comedian
- Ahir Shah, comedian
- Hardeep Singh Kohli, comedian
- Paul Sinha, comedian, doctor and quizzer most known for starring in The Chase
- Adil Ray, British-Indian and British-Pakistani

=== Music ===
- Anoushka Shankar, sitar player and composer
- Apache Indian (musician), singer
- Kanika Kapoor, singer
- Swami, rap/rock band
- Tjinder Singh, lead singer of Cornershop
- Talvin Singh, dance musician
- Nitin Sawhney, dance musician
- Jay Sean, R&B singer
- Kaikhosru Shapurji Sorabji, classical composer
- Panjabi MC, real name Rajinder Rai, dance music
- Rishi Rich, music producer
- H-Dhami, singer-songwriter
- Freddie Mercury, lead singer of the band Queen
- Veronica Mehta, singer
- Charli XCX, pop singer
- Anthony Ghosh, DJ
- Bally Sagoo, record producer
- Shri, musician
- Susheela Raman, musician
- Nik Thakkar, multi-disciplinary recording artist, known professionally as NEO 10Y
- Panjabi Hit Squad, Rav & Dee are producers, DJ's and broadcasters for BBC Asian Network & BBC 1Xtra
- Steel Banglez, record producer

== Business and industry ==
- Amit Bhatia, businessman, owner of Swordfish Investments and Chairman of Queens Park Rangers
- Anshu Jain, Head of Global Markets, Deutsche Bank AG
- Anurag Dikshit, co-founder of PartyGaming
- Ashish Thakkar, businessman and entrepreneur, founder of Mara Group, and Chair of the Global Entrepreneurs Council of the United Nations Foundation
- Avtar Lit, founder of Sunrise Radio
- Dheeraj Hinduja, businessman and chairman of Ashok Leyland
- Dinesh Dhamija, entrepreneur and politician
- Firoz Kassam, former owner of Oxford United F.C.
- Gopichand Hinduja, billionaire and co-chairman of Hinduja Group
- Gulu Lalvani, founder of Binatone
- Kamel Hothi, director at Lloyds Bank
- Karan Bilimoria, founder of Cobra Beer
- Lakshmi Mittal, steel magnate
- Nina Bracewell-Smith, non-executive director of Arsenal F.C.
- Param Singh, entrepreneur
- Sanjeev Gupta, billionaire and founder and executive chairman of Liberty House Group
- Srichand Parmanand Hinduja, billionaire and chairman of Hinduja Group
- Tom Singh, founder of New Look
- Vikrant Bhargava, co-founder of PartyGaming
- Neville Wadia, Bombay Industrialist and philanthropist
- Jasminder Singh, billionaire
- Sunil Vaswani, billionaire
- Swraj Paul, Baron Paul, billionaire
- Saket Burman, billionaire
- Surinder Arora, billionaire
- Ranjit Singh Boparan, billionaire
- Robin Arora, billionaire
- Mohsin and Zuber Issa, billionaire
- Sunder Genomal, billionaire
- Navin Engineer, billionaire
- Herman Narula,CEO of improbable
- Tej Lalvani,CEO of vitabiotics
- Navnit Dholakia, Baron Dholakia
- Mahmud Kamani, chairman of Boohoo group
- Raj Loomba, Baron Loomba
- Akshata Murty
- Nikhil Rathi,British regulatory executive
- Tani Dulay,real estate developer
- Rishi Khosla,founder of Oak north bank
- Nik Jhangiani,Ceo of Diageo
- Sharan Pasricha,ceo of ennismore
- Srinivasan Venkatakrishnan,mining
- Vijay Mallya, fugitive
- Nirav Modi, fugitive
- Lalit Modi,fugitive
- Sri Prakash Lohia, billionaire
- Leena Nair,ceo of Chanel
- M. S. Banga, chairman of uk government investments
- Sauvik Banerjjee,ceo of rezolve
- Manoj Badale,. Agilisys founder
- Ranjit Barthakur,owner of Rajasthan royals
- Sonu Shivdasani, hotelier
- Anil Agrawal, billionaire
- Harren Jhoti,ceo of astex
- Samir desai,ceo of Funding Circle
- PB Balaji,ceo of JLR
- Priyanka Gill,angel investor
- Bhanu Choudhrie,founder of C & C alpha capital
- Shamil thakrar,founder of Dishoom (restaurant)

== Literature and media ==
- Anita Anand, journalist and author
- Anushka Asthana, journalist and editor
- Yasmin Alibhai-Brown, columnist
- Lord Waheed Alli, television producer
- Gurpreet Kaur Bhatti, playwright
- Satyabrata Rai Chowdhuri, author
- Rana Dasgupta, author
- Vish Dhamija, author
- Sonia Faleiro, author
- Janan Ganesh, author and columnist
- Krishnan Guru-Murthy, television journalist
- Mehdi Hasan, political journalist, broadcaster and author
- Sunny Hundal, journalist, political blogger
- Maya Jaggi, writer, literary critic and editor
- Manjit Kumar, author of mathematical and scientific interest
- Sir V.S. Naipaul, author and winner of the 2001 Nobel Prize in Literature
- Ravinder Randhawa, novelist and short story writer
- Sir Salman Rushdie, author, writer and winner of the 1981 Booker Prize
- Sunjeev Sahota, novelist and winner of the 2017 European Union Prize for Literature
- Angela Saini, science journalist and author
- Sathnam Sanghera, journalist and author
- Sasthi Brata, writer
- Vikram Seth, author
- Nikesh Shukla, author
- Jay Shetty, author, podcaster and motivational speaker
- Tasha Suri, writer

== Politics ==
=== Prime Ministers ===
- Rishi Sunak, former Prime Minister of the United Kingdom and Leader of the Conservative Party (2022-2024) and MP for Richmond and Northallerton.

Members of Parliament

- Kanishka Narayan, current Labour MP in the Vale of Glamorgan and the first ethnic minority MP in Wales
- Mancherjee Bhownagree, former Conservative, second Indian MP in British Parliament
- Dinesh Dhamija, former Liberal Democrat MEP
- Parmjit Singh Gill, Liberal Democrat MP
- Piara Khabra, former Labour MP (deceased)
- Ashok Kumar, former Labour MP
- Seema Malhotra, Labour MP
- Lisa Nandy, Labour MP, current Secretary of State for Culture, Media and Sport
- Dadabhai Naoroji, former Liberal Party MP, first Indian MP in British Parliament
- Navendu Mishra, Labour MP
- Priti Patel, Conservative MP and former UK Home Secretary
- Shapurji Saklatvala, former Communist MP
- Alok Sharma, Conservative MP and former Secretary of State for Business, Energy and Industrial Strategy
- Virendra Sharma, Labour MP
- Marsha Singh, former Labour MP
- Rishi Sunak, Conservative MP, former Prime Minister of the United Kingdom (first British Indian prime minister) and Leader of the Conservative Party
- Suella Braverman, Conservative MP and former UK Home Secretary
- Shailesh Vara, Conservative MP
- Keith Vaz, former Labour MP
- Valerie Vaz, Labour MP
- Sojan Joseph, MP for Ashford

=== Mayors ===
- Chaman Lal - First British Indian Lord Mayor of Europe's largest council, Birmingham City Council.
- Ram Parkash Lakha - Former Lord Mayor of Coventry.
- Neeraj Patil, Mayor of Lambeth
- Bishan Dass - Elected as first British Asian Lord Mayor of Wolverhampton in 1986.
- Gurdip Bungar - Former mayor of Gravesham Council who has been elected twice.

=== Peers ===
- Kumar Bhattacharyya, Baron Bhattacharyya of Moseley, former engineer, government advisor and Labour peer in the House of Lords.
- Shami Chakrabarti, Baroness Chakrabarti of Kennington, Labour Party politician, barrister and former director of Liberty
- Meghnad Desai, Baron Desai
- Tarsem King, Baron King of West Bromwich
- Bhikhu Parekh, Baron Parekh
- Adam Patel, Baron Patel of Blackburn
- Dolar Popat, Baron Popat of Harrow
- Diljit Rana, Baron Rana
- Indarjit Singh, Baron Singh of Wimbledon, Crossbench Peer in the House of Lords
- Raj Loomba, Baron Loomba, Crossbench Peer in the House of Lords

=== Members of Scottish Parliament ===
- Sandesh Gulhane, first male MSP of Indian descent
- Pam Gosal, first female MSP of Indian descent

=== Members of the Senedd ===
- Altaf Hussain, first AM of Indian descent

=== Members of European Parliament ===
- Nirj Deva, former Conservative MP and MEP
- Claude Moraes, former Labour MEP

=== Others in politics ===
- Raheem Kassam, conservative British political activist
- Neeraj Patil, Mayor of Lambeth

== Sports ==
- Naiktha Bains, tennis player
- Ravi Bopara, cricketer
- Michael Chopra, footballer, Newcastle United
- Yan Dhanda, footballer
- Isa Guha, cricketer
- Nasser Hussain, cricketer, former England captain
- Ronnie Irani, cricketer
- Jazz Juttla, footballer
- Monty Panesar, cricketer
- Kishor Patel, cricketer
- Aaron Rai, golfer and winner of the 2026 PGA Championship
- Mark Ramprakash, cricketer
- Harpal Singh, footballer, Leeds United AFC
- Vikram Solanki, cricketer
- Neil Taylor, Welsh footballer
- Simranjit Thandi, footballer
- Samit Patel, cricketer

== Others ==
- George Edalji, barrister falsely accused of horse killing, defended by Arthur Conan Doyle
- Seema Jaswal, British sports journalist
- Dina Jinnah, daughter of Muhammad Ali Jinnah
- Atul Kochhar, Michelin star chef
- Zion Lights, British-born activist
- Sunand Prasad, architect, former RIBA president
- Viswashkumar Ramesh, sole survivor of Air India Flight 171
- Balwinder Rana, activist
- Buck Ruxton, 1930s murderer, born a Parsi
- Saira Shah, journalist, daughter of Idries Shah
- Sophia Duleep Singh, suffragette
- Talha Asmal, Britain’s youngest suicide bomber at 17 years old

== See also ==
- British Indian
- Immigration to the United Kingdom
- Indian diaspora
- List of British Sikhs
- List of Indian Americans
- List of Indo-Canadians
- Indian (disambiguation)
