= List of Indo-Canadians =

== A ==
- Bharat Agnihotri - Alberta Liberal MLA
- Kiran Ahluwalia - singer
- Nira Arora - morning show radio host for CFBT-FM 94.5 in Vancouver, BC
- Chandra Arya - Liberal MP

== B ==
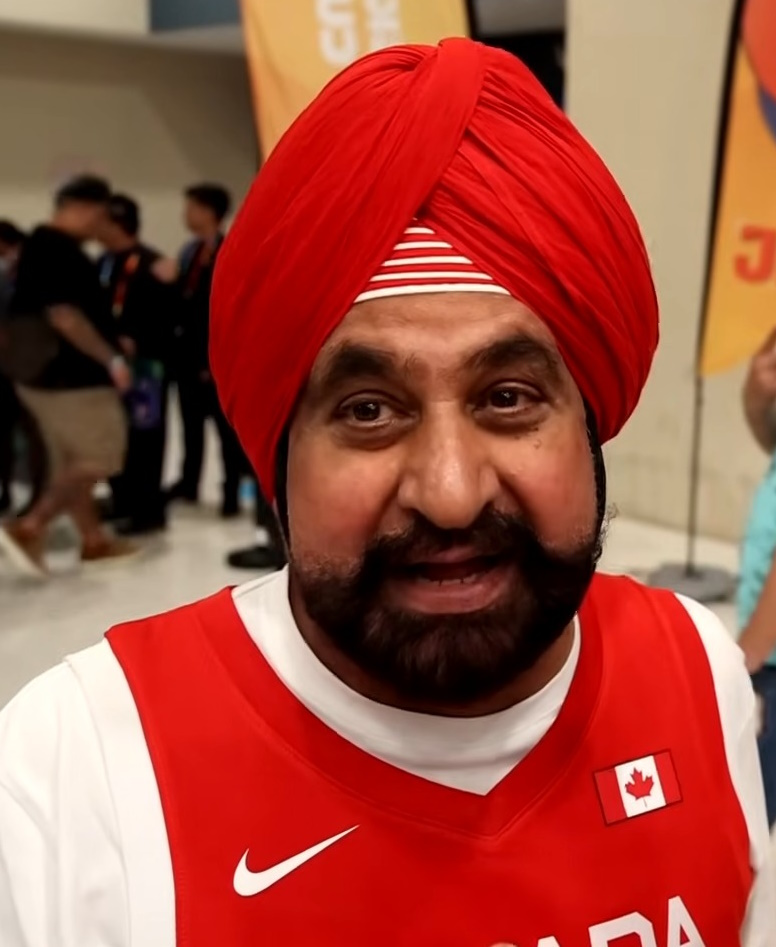
Nav Bhatia

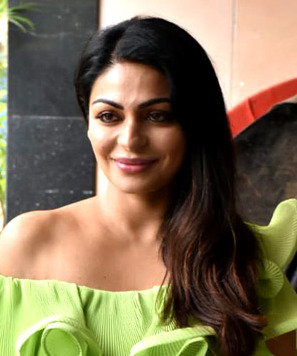
Neeru Bajwa

- Anita Rau Badami - novelist
- Ashish Bagai - former captain of the Canadian cricket team
- Amir Bageria - actor
- Dave Baksh - rock guitarist for Sum 41, Brown Brigade, Organ Thieves and Black Cat Attack
- Manjul Bhargava - mathematician, Fields Medalist
- Ruby Bhatia - VJ, television show host, and actress
- Nav Bhatia - businessman and superfan of the Toronto Raptors
- Hardial Bains - founder and leader of the Marxist–Leninist Party of Canada, 1970–1997
- Harry Bains - British Columbia New Democratic MLA
- Navdeep Bains - Liberal Member of Parliament
- Neeru Bajwa - Canadian actress, director and producer
- Shauna Singh Baldwin - novelist
- Rupan Bal - actor and youtuber
- Bas Balkissoon - MPP
- Nirmala Basnayake - rock singer (controller.controller)
- Sheela Basrur - former Ontario Chief Medical Officer of Health and Assistant Deputy Minister of Public Health
- Nuvraj Singh Bassi - professional football player
- Robin Bawa - played for several NHL teams and in minor leagues
- Ishq Bector - HipHop/R&B musician and composer
- Rajat Bedi - Bollywood actor-turned film producer who settled in Canada
- Nadira Begg - television journalist
- Stan Bharti - businessman and philanthropist
- Shashi Bhat - writer
- Arjan Bhullar - wrestler
- Sim Bhullar - NBA basketball player
- Neil Bissoondath - author
- Glenda Braganza - actress
- Jagrup Brar - British Columbia NDP MLA
- Byg Byrd - music producer

== C ==
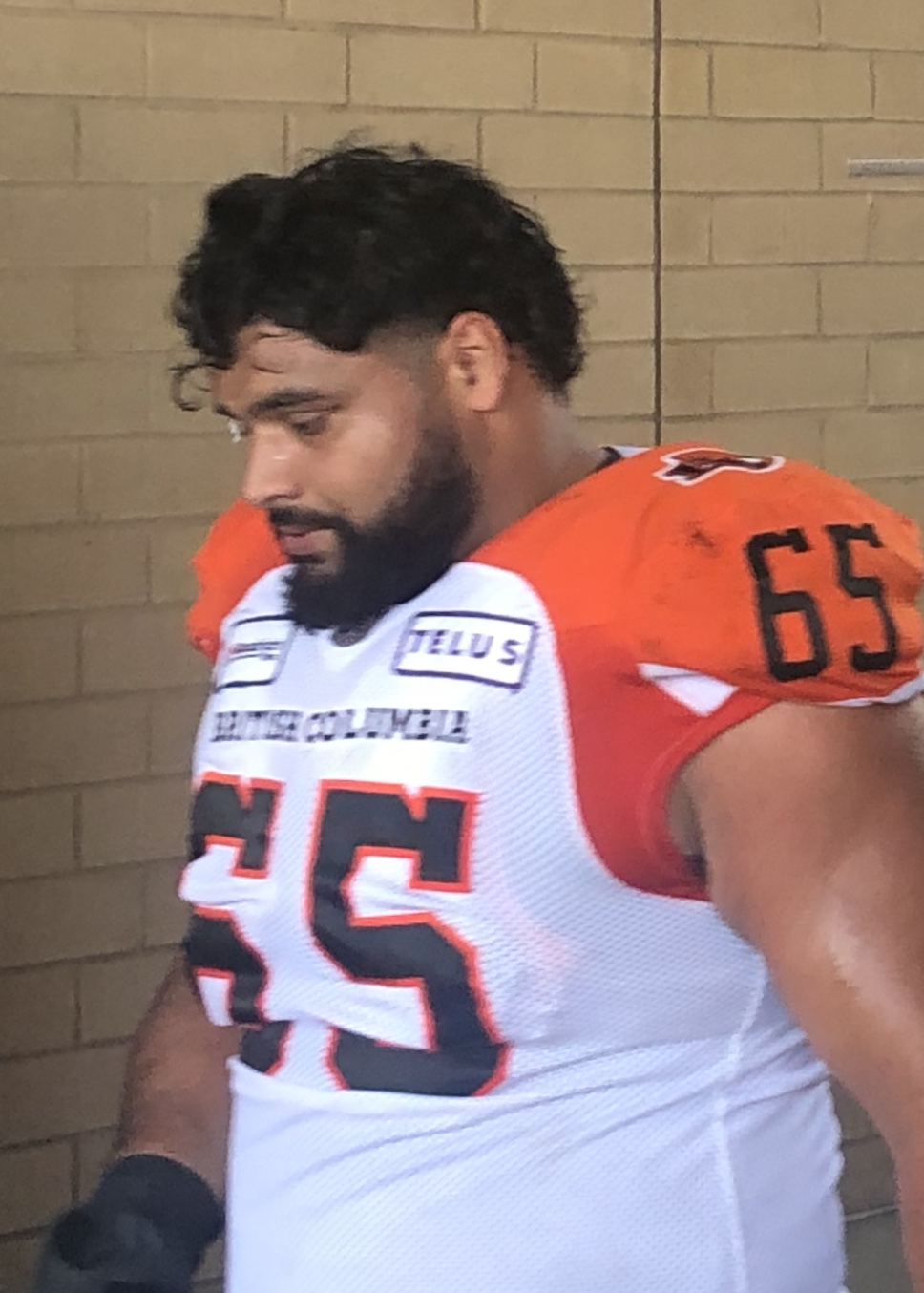
Sukh Chungh

- Jaime Callica – actor and former dancer
- Baljit Singh Chadha - businessman
- Gulzar Singh Cheema - physician, politician
- Paul Chohan - field hockey player
- Raj Chouhan - politician
- Sukh Chungh - CFL player
- Saroja Coelho - CBC Radio host
- Nazneen Contractor - actress

== D ==
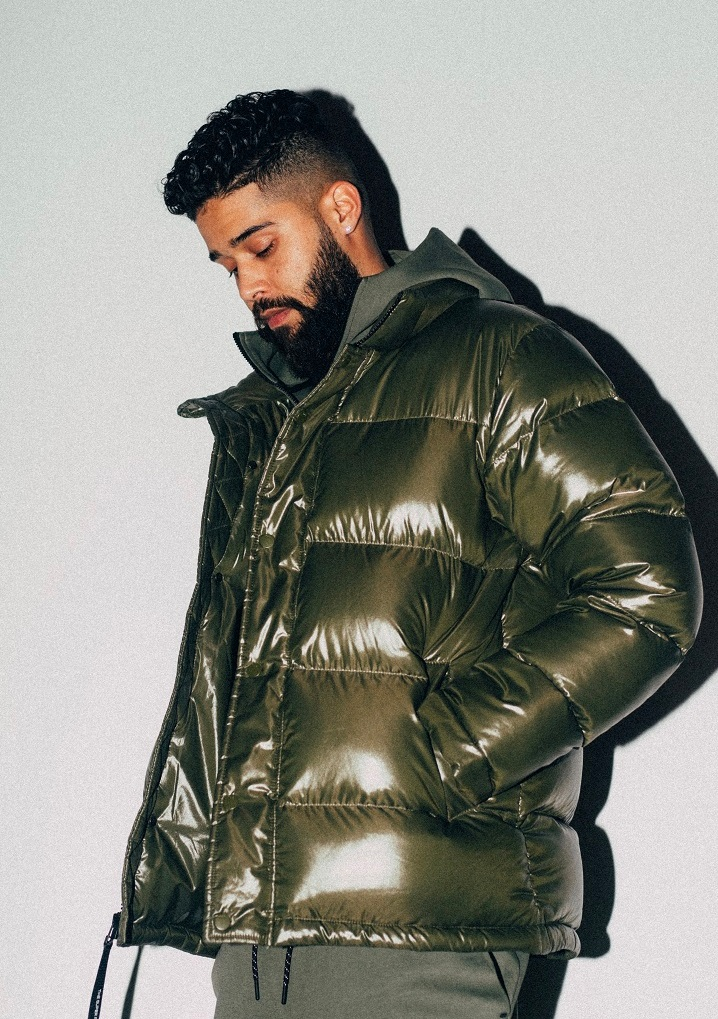
AP Dhillon

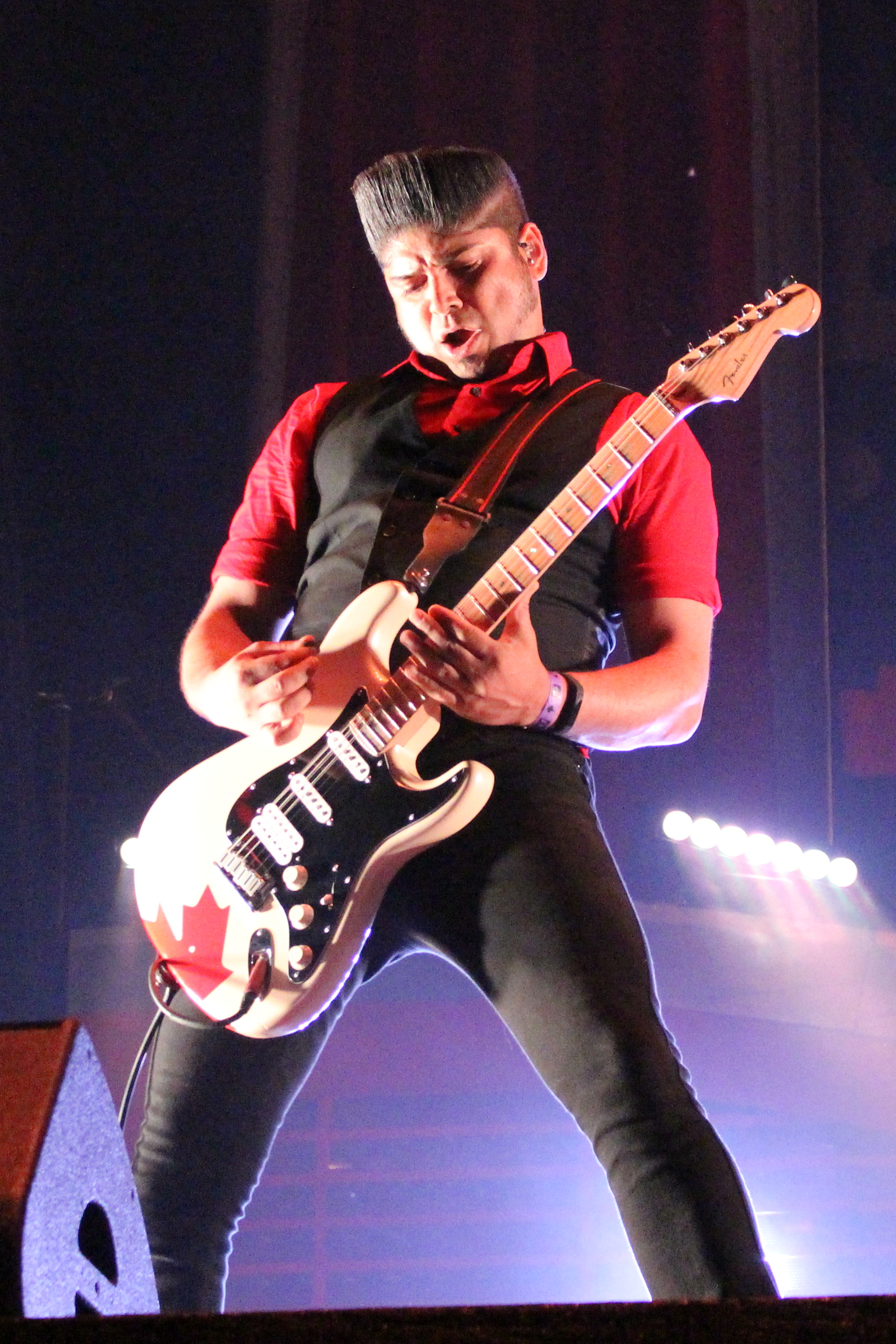
Ian D'Sa

- Deepa Mehta - filmmaker
- Deepak Anand - Mississauga Malton MPP www.deepakanandmpp.ca
- Cindy Daniel - singer
- Dipika Damerla - MPP Ontario
- Joe Daniel - Conservative MP and first Malayali elected to Parliament
- Agam Darshi - actress and filmmaker
- Karen David - pop singer
- Monika Deol - former MuchMusic host and CIVT news anchor
- Ranjeev Deol - field hockey player
- Sudi Devanesen - physician and member of the Order of Canada
- Herb Dhaliwal - Liberal MP and the first Indo-Canadian cabinet minister
- Ranj Dhaliwal - Canadian author
- Sukh Dhaliwal - Liberal MP
- Naranjan Dhalla - cardiovascular research scientist and member of the Order of Canada
- Ruby Dhalla - Liberal MP
- Sunil Dhaniram - cricket player
- AP Dhillon - music artist
- Bob Singh Dhillon - Punjabi Indo-Canadian Sikh property businessman
- Haninder Dhillon - cricket player
- Priyanka Dhillon - boxer
- R Paul Dhillon - director, producer, writer and journalist
- Vekeana Dhillon - Vancouver screenwriter, television presenter, actress
- Vic Dhillon - Ontario Liberal MPP
- Vikram Dhillon - Vancouver producer, director, actor and television presenter
- Ujjal Dosanjh - former Premier of British Columbia, first Indian-Canadian premier, former federal Minister of Health, and current National Defence Critic
- John Dossetor - physician and bioethicist, member of the Order of Canada
- Ian D'Sa - guitarist of rock band Billy Talent

== G ==
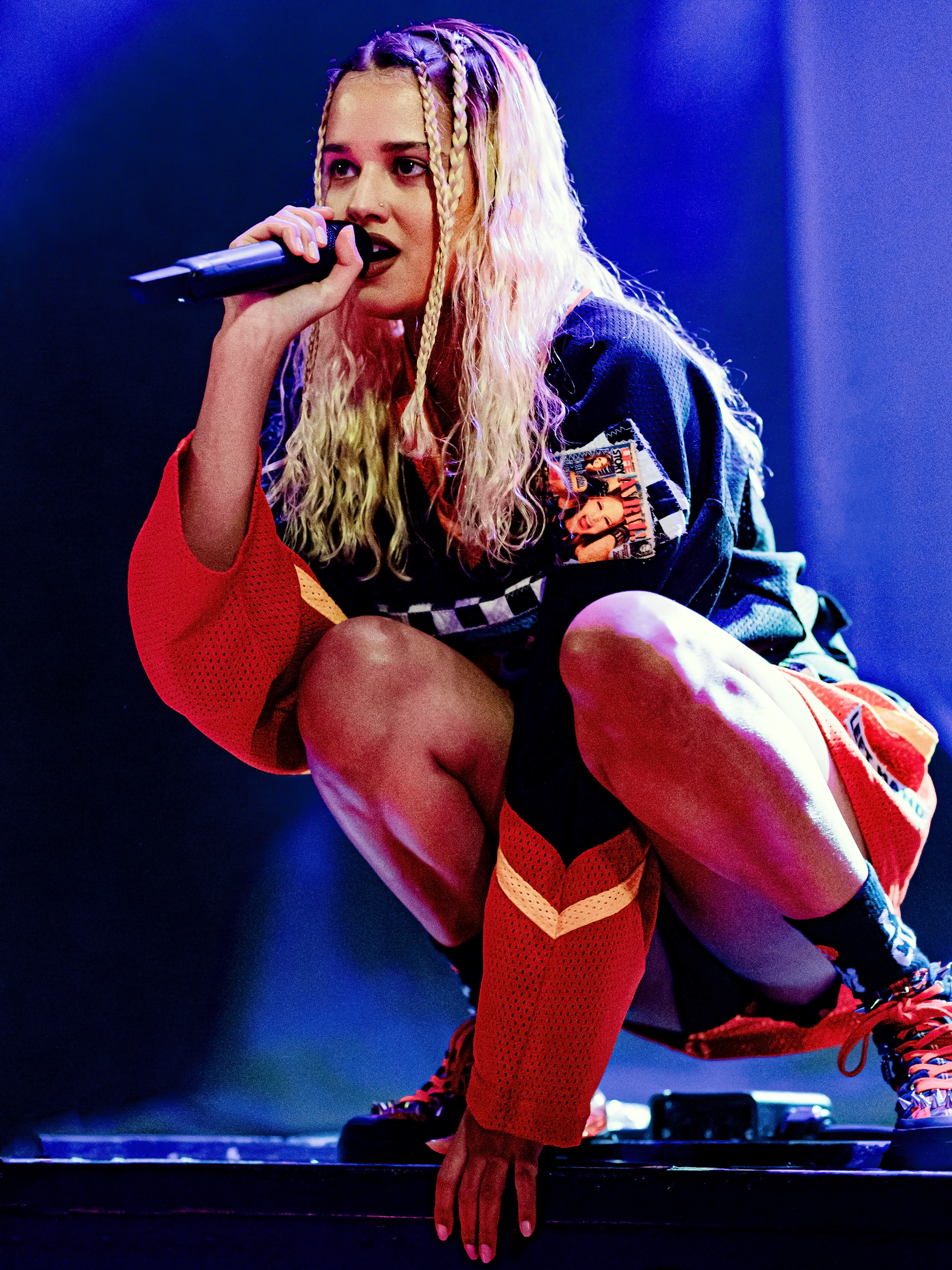
Tommy Genesis

- Nisha Ganatra - film director, film producer, writer and actor
- Tommy Genesis - rapper and model of mixed Indian and Swedish descent
- Shuman Ghosemajumder - businessman and computer scientist
- Yasmeen Ghauri - model
- Raminder Gill - former Ontario Progressive Conservative MPP and federal Conservative candidate
- Jyoti Gondek - politician, Mayor of Calgary (2021–2025)
- Dylan Mohan Gray - film director, producer, writer
- Gurmant Grewal - former Conservative MP (3-terms)and Deputy Opposition House Leader, half (with Nina, listed below) of the first married couple to serve as MPs in the same session of Parliament
- Nina Grewal - Conservative MP (4-terms), half (with Gurmant) of the first married couple to serve as MPs in the same session of Parliament

== H ==
- Pooja Handa - journalist
- Syeda Saiyidain Hameed - Indian Canadian social and women's rights activist, educationist, writer, former member of the Planning Commission of India; executive assistant to the Minister of Advanced Education and Manpower, Government of Alberta, 1975; Director of Colleges and Universities at the ministry, 1978
- Ian Hanomansing - CBC journalist, co-host of The National
- Tara Singh Hayer - newspaper publisher
- Kash Heed - former chief constable of West Vancouver Police Department; former superintendent with the Vancouver Police Department
- Kamal Heer - singer
- Rena Heer - worked with Channel M, then with Global BC and now on CTV
- Darryl Hinds - actor and comedian
- Shaan Hundal - professional soccer player

== I ==
- Indrani (full name Indrani Pal-Chaudhuri) - photographer, director, TV personality and model
- Chin Injeti - R&B musician
- Anosh Irani - novelist and playwright
- Inderjit Vasudevan Moorthy - Indo Canadian entrepreneur

== J ==
- Ellis Jacob - businessman person
- Mobina Jaffer - senator
- Rahim Jaffer - former Alberta Conservative MP (Edmonton-Strathcona)
- Kim Jagtiani - television personality
- Mahmud Jamal - Canadian Supreme Court Justice
- Neilank Jha - Canadian neurosurgeon
- Jazzy B - singer
- Bidhu Jha - Manitoba NDP MLA
- Avan Jogia - actor
- Bindy Johal - Vancouver gangster and drug trafficker
- Prakash John - R&B musician
- Jonita Gandhi - Bollywood singer

== K ==
- Cassius Khan - musician instrument
- Ravi Kahlon - field hockey player
- Darshan Kang - Alberta MP
- Hari Kant - former field hockey goalkeeper
- Rupi Kaur - poet
- Jujhar Khaira - NHL player for the Edmonton Oilers
- Vim Kochhar - businessman and senator
- Koushik - hip hop musician
- Srinivas Krishna - actor, film director (Masala)
- Kuldip Singh Kular - former Ontario Liberal MPP
- Bindi Kullar - field hockey player
- Faisal Kutty - attorney, writer and law professor
- Kader Khan - actor, screenwriter

== L ==
- Harold Sonny Ladoo - novelist and author
- Vaughn Lal - bassist and backing vocalist for heavy metal band Brown Brigade
- Harry Lali - BC NDP MLA
- Nancy Lee - short story writer and novelist
- Sunny Leone - actress

== M ==
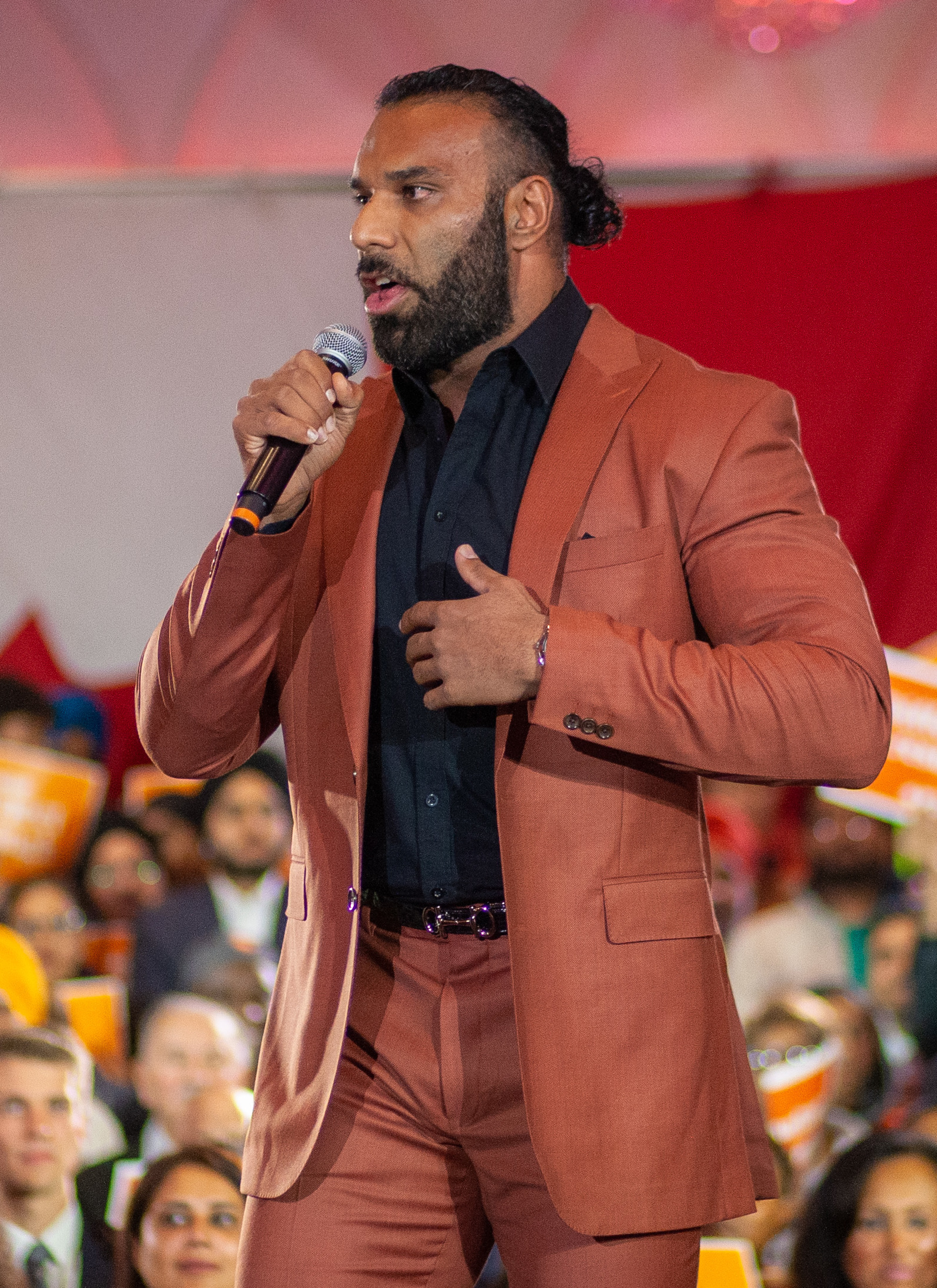
Jinder Mahal

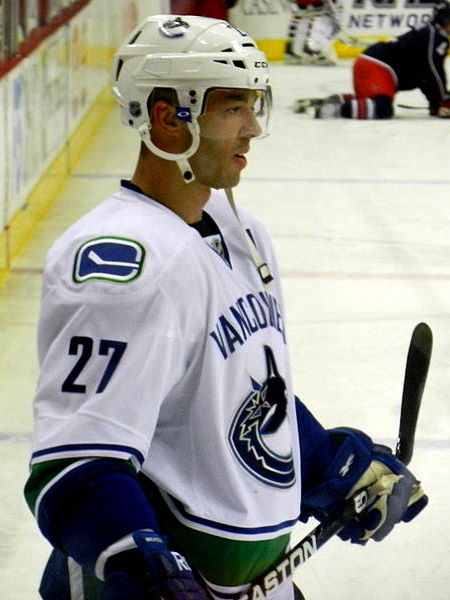
Manny Malhotra

- Baj Maan - soccer player
- Rup Magon - singer and actor
- Jinder Mahal (real name Yuvraj Singh Dhesi) - wrestler
- Anita Majumdar - actress
- Shuvaloy Majumdar - Conservative MP
- Shaun Majumder - actor/comedian
- Masumeh Makhija - actress
- Gurbax Singh Malhi - former Liberal MP
- Caleb Malhotra - ice hockey player
- Manny Malhotra - former NHL player
- Samir Mallal - filmmaker
- Sunny Malton - music artist
- Amrit Mangat - Ontario Liberal MPP
- Irshad Manji - author
- Harbhajan Mann - singer
- Salim Mansur - columnist for the London Free Press and the Toronto Sun
- Bharat Masrani - Chief Executive Officer of the Toronto-Dominion Bank
- Suleka Mathew - actress
- Ashok Mathur - writer and professor
- Maxim Mazumdar - playwright and founder of the Stephenville Theatre Festival
- Suhana Meharchand - journalist, Canadian Broadcasting Corporation
- Deepa Mehta - film director (Bollywood/Hollywood, Fire, Earth, Water)
- Nicky Mehta - singer
- Richie Mehta - director
- Shaun Mehta - writer
- Rohinton Mistry - novelist
- Pavan Moondi - film and television director
- Shani Mootoo - writer
- Alok Mukherjee - current chair of the Toronto Police Services Board
- Audri Mukhopadhyay - Canadian diplomat, former Consul General in Ho Chi Minh City, Vietnam
- M. Ram Murty - head of the Department of Mathematics and Statistics at Queen's University
- Tad Murty
- Nadir Mohamed - former President & CEO of Rogers Communications

== N ==
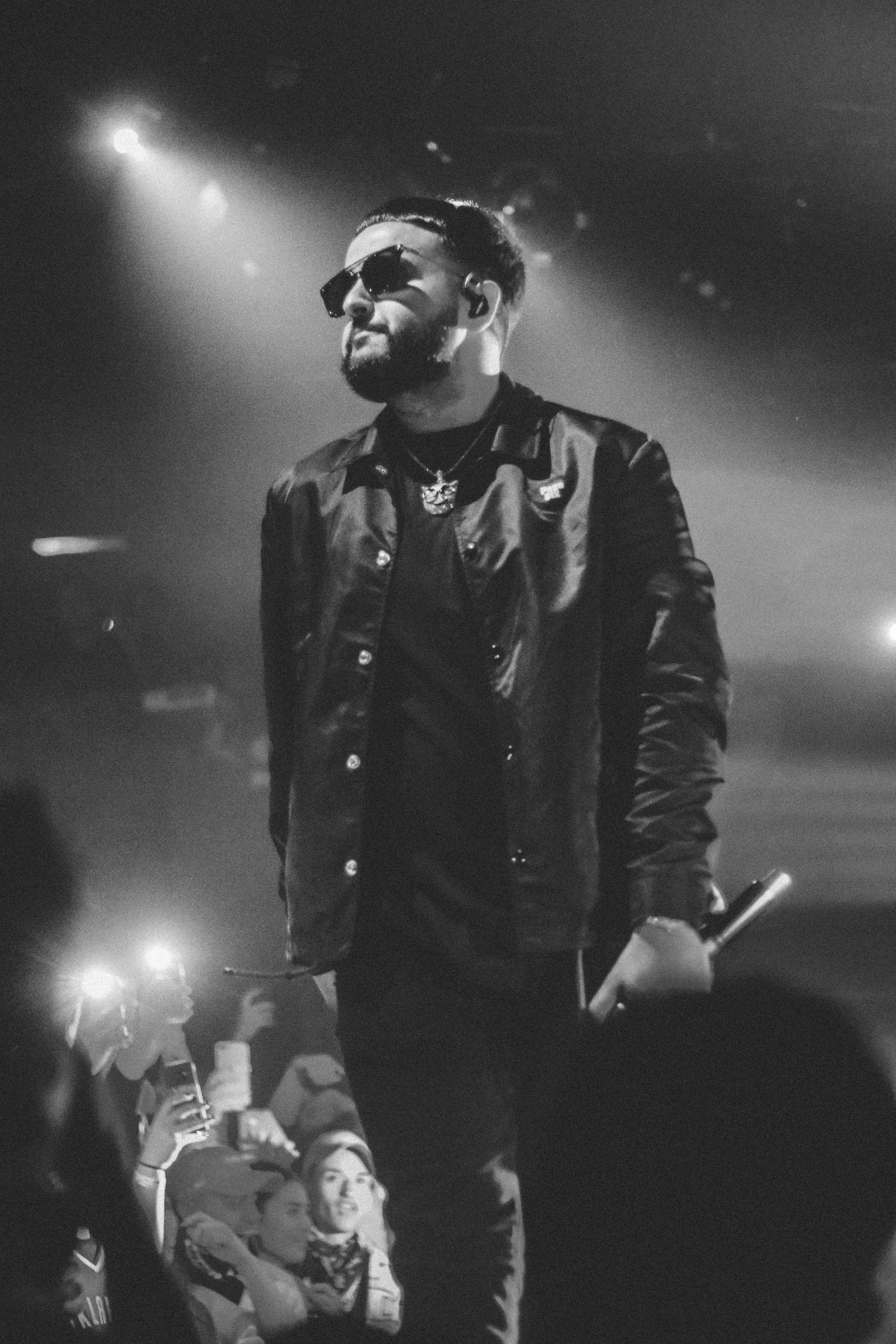
Nav

- Roger Nair - filmmaker, Human Rights activist, actor, executive on Toronto Film Board
- Naheed Nenshi - mayor of Calgary
- Rob Nijjar - former BC Liberal MLA
- Nav - rapper and producer from Toronto, Ontario signed to The Weeknd's XO record label
- Hardeep Singh Nijjar - separatist leader

== O ==
- Deepak Obhrai - former Alberta Conservative MP, Calgary
- Wally Oppal - former Attorney General of British Columbia

== P ==
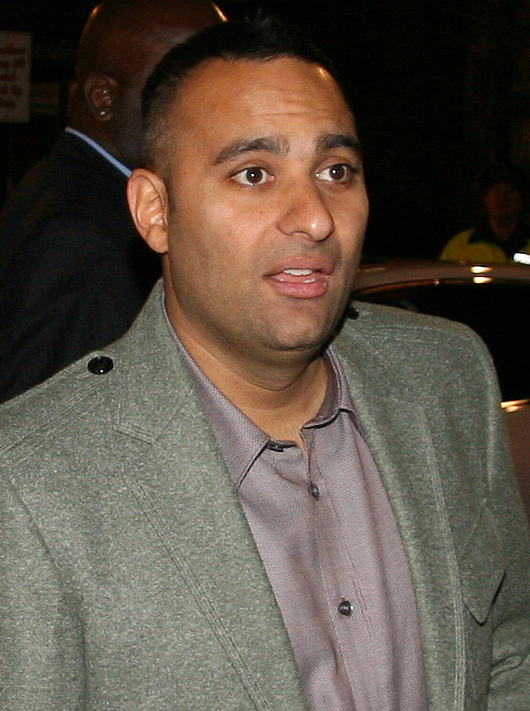
Russell Peters

- Soni Pabla - musician
- Parichav - singer, music producer, composer and live performer
- Lata Pada - Bharatanatyam dancer
- Nisha Pahuja - filmmaker
- AR Paisley - rapper
- Raj Pannu - former leader of the Alberta New Democrats, the first Indian-Canadian leader of a political party
- Jivesh Parasram - playwright
- Zayne Parekh - ice hockey player
- Talwinder Singh Parmar - separatist leader
- Ashish Patel - cricket player
- Jitendra Patel - cricket player
- Ellora Patnaik - actress and dancer
- Jason Patraj - cricket player
- Anjulie Persaud - singer
- Russell Peters - stand-up comedian
- Ranj Pillai - Premier of Yukon
- Abishur Prakash - geopolitical futurist, author
- Priyanka - drag artist, and winner of Canada's Drag Race Season 1
- Ishwar Puri - scientist, academic, Fellow of Canadian Academy of Engineering, NSERC Council member

== R ==
- Raghav - R&B singer
- Pamela Rai - Canadian Olympic swimmer, 1984 bronze medallist, first Punjabi woman to win an Olympic medal
- Monita Rajpal - CNN International news anchor
- Rudy Ramcharan - curler
- Emile Ramsammy - thoroughbred horse racer
- Meaghan Rath - actress
- Lisa Ray - film actress
- Ajmer Rode - poet and playwright
- Renee Rosnes - jazz pianist and composer/arranger

== S ==
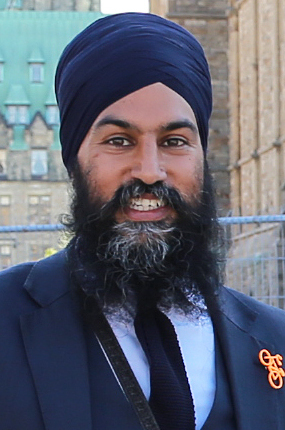
Jagmeet Singh

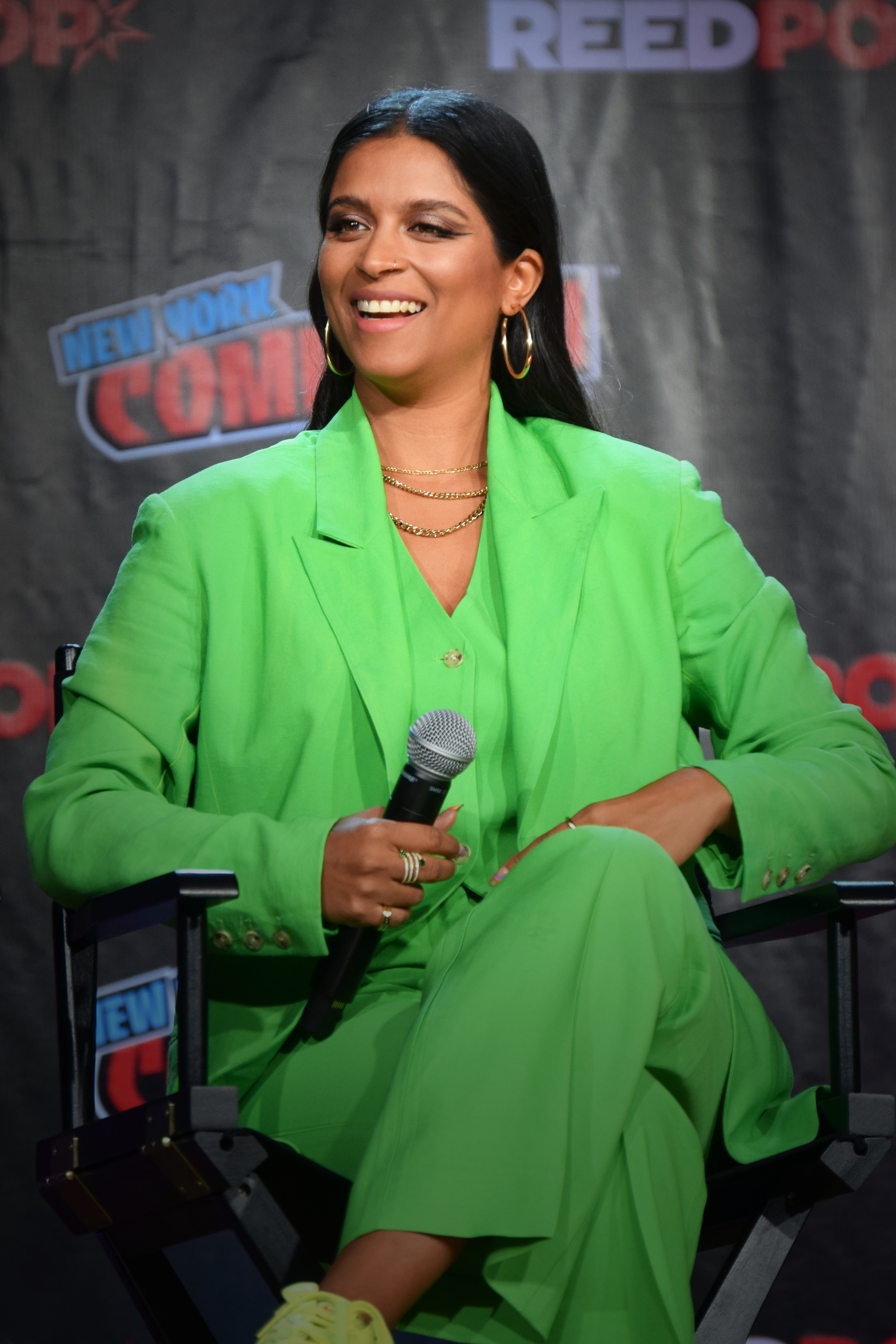
Lilly Singh

- Omar Sachedina - journalist, anchor of CTV National News
- Vik Sahay - actor
- Patty Sahota - former BC Liberal MLA
- Josh Sahunta - pop/R&B singer-songwriter
- Deep Saini - Vice-President of University of Toronto
- Harjit Sajjan - politician
- Shaiju Mathew - Author and Filmmaker
- Sugar Sammy - comedian
- Sathajhan Sarachandran - convicted in 2009 of providing support to terrorist groups in Sri Lanka
- Varun Saranga - actor
- Emanuel Sandhu - figure skater
- Madeline Schizas - figure skater
- Surendra Seeraj - cricket player
- Asha Seth - senator
- Roshan Sethi - film director and physician
- Chandrakant Shah - academic researcher, doctor, and social activist; recipient of Order of Ontario
- Melinda Shankar - actress
- Rosette Sharma - singer and dancer
- Rekha Sharma - actress
- Devinder Shory - Member of Parliament
- Vivek Shraya - writer and musician
- Haroon Siddiqui - reporter, editor and columnist
- Moe Sihota - former British Columbia NDP MLA and television host and first Indo-Canadian elected to any legislature in Canada back in 1986
- Hannah Simone - actress, TV host, and fashion model
- Judi Singh - jazz singer
- Bobby Singh - former football player; played in the CFL, NFL and XFL
- Champagne Singh - professional wrestler
- Dilpreet Bajwa - cricket player
- Gurratan Singh - politician
- Jaggi Singh - anti-globalisation and social justice activist
- Jagmeet Singh - politician, leader of the NDP
- Jaspreet Singh - author
- Lilly Singh - YouTube personality and TV show host
- Pargat Singh - cricket player
- Raj Singh - professional wrestler
- Tiger Jeet Singh - wrestler currently in Japan
- Tiger Ali Singh - professional wrestler, son of Tiger Jeet Singh
- Pamela Mala Sinha - actress, playwright
- Errol Sitahal - actor
- Amarjeet Sohi - politician, Mayor of Edmonton (2021–2025)
- Ajit H. Someshwar - businessman and philanthropist
- Ashwin Sood - drummer for (and former husband of) Sarah McLachlan
- Manoj Sood - actor (Little Mosque on the Prairie)
- Durand Soraine - cricket player
- Shweta Subram - Bollywood playback singer
- Moez Surani - poet
- Rajiv Surendra - actor

== T ==
- Proma Tagore - writer and novelist
- Harinder Takhar - Ontario Liberal MPP and Minister of Transportation
- Harpal Talhan - lightweight boxer
- Nina Tangri - MPP, Ontario
- Sam Tata - portrait photographer, born in Shanghai and lived in Montreal
- Tesher - singer and producer
- Shashaa Tirupati - Bollywood singer

== U ==
- Priscila Uppal - novelist and poet
- Tim Uppal - MP, Alberta
- Uppekha Jain - Actress, Slam Poet

== V ==
- Sugith Varughese - actor
- M.G. Vassanji - novelist
- Aliza Vellani - actress (Little Mosque on the Prairie)
- Ali Velshi - stock analyst and television journalist
- Murad Velshi - former Ontario Liberal MPP
- Neelam Verma - Miss Universe Canada 2002
- Richard Verma - U.S. Ambassador to India since 2015
- Vandana Vishwas - world music artist
- Reena Virk - murder victim

== W ==
- Ravi Walia - figure skater
- Supinder Wraich - actress

== Y ==
- YouTwoTV - YouTube channel; duo consists of Jaz Saini and Harjit Bhandal

== Z ==
- Ravi Zacharias - alleged serial sexual abuser, Christian apologist, speaker, author

== See also ==
- Indian American
- British Indian
- Indo-Canadian
- Indian South Africans
- List of Indian Americans
- List of Indian Britons
