= Jas Binag =

Indo-British model and actor

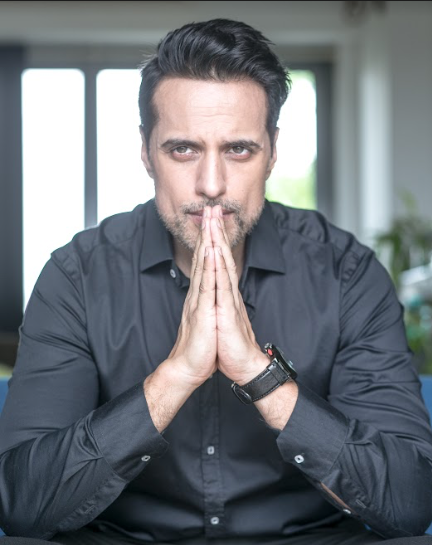
On a film set.

Jas Binag (born 16 April) is an Indo-British Actor/Model. He first appeared on Channel 4's "Bollywood Star" and later performed in many Theatre Plays including the Pulitzer Prize nominated play "A Perfect Ganesh" written by Terrence McNally directed by Samir Bhamra. He has acted in films such as; Kaam Ka Plot, Graveyard Shift and "Souten 2" by Saawan Kumar Tak. Recently, he has been working on a crime thriller called Badnaam (Vikram Bhatt) and London Confidential directed by Kanwal Sethi which tackles the issue of COVID-19.

== Acting career ==
He began his acting career in the Bollywood Star series by Channel 4. He shifted his focus to theatre and stage, and starred as the lead actor in productions such as Precious Bazaar written by Samir Bhamra, contemporary adaptations of William Shakespeare plays like What You Fancy, Romeo & Laila, and A Perfect Ganesh.

He has acted in Minty Tejpals "Kaam Ka Plot" playing opposite Sandhya Mridul. His second movie in Bollywood was "Graveyard Shift" where he portrayed a troubled Boxer. He has worked with director Saawan Kumar in the Rajesh Khanna sequel "Souten 2".

His last two projects have bought him back to London, where he has completed filming for the Vikram Bhatt crime thriller,"Badnaam" and London Confidential.

Jas has also ventured into the world of web shows. His latest show was the "Alt Balaji" series called Mentalhood.
