= Colin Dingwall =

British biochemist and cell biologist

Colin Dingwall is a British biochemist and cell biologist. He is a Fellow of the Royal Society of Biology and a Life Member of Clare Hall, Cambridge UK. Working with Ron Laskey and John Gurdon he identified the bipartite nuclear localization sequence which is the major signal for protein entry into the nucleus.

== Most cited papers ==
- Dingwall C, Laskey RA. Nuclear targeting sequences—a consensus?. Trends in biochemical sciences. 1991 Jan 1;16:478-81. According to Google Scholar, this paper has been cited 2252 times
- Robbins J, Dilwortht SM, Laskey RA, Dingwall C. Two interdependent basic domains in nucleoplasmin nuclear targeting sequence: identification of a class of bipartite nuclear targeting sequence. Cell. 1991 Feb 8;64(3):615-23. According to Google Scholar, this paper has been cited 1690 times.
- Hussain I, Powell D, Howlett DR, Tew DG, Meek TD, Chapman C, Gloger IS, Murphy KE, Southan CD, Ryan DM, Smith TS. Identification of a novel aspartic protease (Asp 2) as β-secretase. Molecular and Cellular Neuroscience. 1999 Dec 1;14(6):419-27. According to Google Scholar, this paper has been cited 1413 times.
- Martins LM, Iaccarino I, Tenev T, Gschmeissner S, Totty NF, Lemoine NR, Savopoulos J, Gray CW, Creasy CL, Dingwall C, Downward J. The serine protease Omi/HtrA2 regulates apoptosis by binding XIAP through a reaper-like motif. Journal of Biological Chemistry. 2002 Jan 4;277(1):439-44.. According to Google Scholar, this paper has been cited 671 times.
