= Woodbourne Group =

England-based commercial real estate services and investment company

Woodbourne Group plc
- Company type: Private
- Industry: Real estate
- Founded: 2019; 7 years ago
- Founder: Tani Dulay
- Headquarters: Birmingham, England
- Area served: Birmingham
- Key people: Tani Dulay (CEO)
- Website: woodbournegroup.com

Woodbourne Group plc is a UK-based real estate and private equity company headquartered in Birmingham, England formed in 2019 by chief executive Tani Dulay. It is the developer behind the £4 billion Birmingham Knowledge Quarter, one of the UK Government’s "Investment Zones". The company works in asset management and development for commercial real estate.

== History ==
=== 2016–2023 ===
Tani Dulay started the Curzon Wharf project in 2016, buying sections of the site from Nuffield College, Oxford and Downing. By 2019, Dulay had four adjacent sections.

In 2019, Woodbourne acquired Mill Wharf from London-based Downing LLP for £5.5m.

In 2022, the company launched Woodbourne Ventures, an early capital and pre-seed accelerator fund. It has invested £1 million investment into digital asset businesses.

In 2023, Woodbourne received approval to build the £360m Curzon Wharf scheme in Birmingham, the tallest tower in the city, along with apartments, student flats, and life sciences facilities. The project is set to be the world's first mixed-use net zero carbon ready development, and the United Kingdom's first net-zero, carbon-neutral development. At the time, Councillor Ian Ward of the Labour Party stated it would position Birmingham at the "forefront of green, sustainable development." Andy Street, the Mayor of the West Midlands at the time, stated that "this is another significant milestone for Tani and his team at Woodbourne Group. It’s testament to their vision and hard work."

In May 2023, at UK’s Real Estate Investment and Infrastructure Forum (UKREiif), Woodbourne Group was shortlisted for Net Zero Pioneer of the Year and Developer of the Year alongside Related Argent, the joint-venture between the developer behind Kings Cross Central and Related Companies, the developer of Hudson Yards 1 in Manhattan.

In the House of Commons' 2023 Autumn Budget, presented by Chancellor of the Exchequer Jeremy Hunt, Woodbourne was noted for its role in the West Midlands Investment Zone where Bruntwood SciTech and Woodbourne Group made a £70 million anchor investment in the Birmingham Knowledge Quarter, further backed by over £5 million for digital platforms designed to support manufacturing growth.

=== 2024–present ===
In September 2024, Woodbourne announced plans to build a £100m portfolio of self-storage facilities, beginning with a pound development in the West Midlands.

In February 2025, Woodbourne sold a commercial investment to S&P 500-listed investment trust Realty Income in a £6.5 million off-market deal.

In May 2025, the Birmingham Knowledge Quarter, a £4 billion innovation district was announced by Woodbourne Group in partnership with Aston University, Birmingham City University, Bruntwood SciTech and Birmingham City Council. The project is projected to deliver over 22,000 jobs, 4,800 new homes and life sciences.

In October 2025, the Government of the United Kingdom announced that Woodbourne, in partnership with Hines, founded by American billionaire real estate developer Gerald D. Hines, would invest up to £400 million into Birmingham as part of the Birmingham Knowledge Quarter innovation district.

In March 2026, Woodbourne launched Birmingham BioCity, a £90 million life sciences facility, part of the company's £210 million life sciences investment programme within the Birmingham Knowledge Quarter.
