= Richard Harland (biologist) =

American biologist

Richard Harland FRS
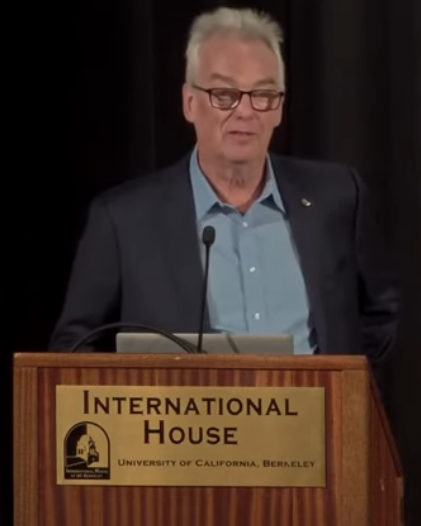
- Born: Richard M. Harland
- Education: University of Cambridge (PhD)
- Awards: Member of the National Academy of Sciences (2014)
- Scientific career
- Fields: Developmental biology
- Workplaces: University of Cambridge; Laboratory of Molecular Biology; Fred Hutchinson Cancer Research Center; University of California, Berkeley
- Thesis: Control of chromosomal replication (1980)
- Doctoral advisor: Ron Laskey
- Website: mcb.berkeley.edu/faculty/GEN/harlandr.html

Richard Mark Harland is an American researcher who is CH Li Distinguished Professor of Genetics, Genomics and Development at the University of California, Berkeley.

== Education ==
Harland completed his PhD at the Medical Research Council (MRC) Laboratory of Molecular Biology (LMB) at the University of Cambridge under the supervision of Ron Laskey on regulation of DNA replication in Xenopus embryos.

== Career and research ==
Following postdoctoral work at the LMB and at the Fred Hutchinson Cancer Research Center with Harold M. Weintraub and Steve McKnight in Seattle he moved to the University of California, Berkeley in 1985.

Harland's research aims to understand early developmental biology of vertebrates at the molecular level. Major contributions include understanding the early embryo, and the induction and patterning of the neural plate and the Spemann-Mangold organizer.

=== Awards and honours ===
Harland was elected a Fellow of the Royal Society (FRS) in 2019 for "substantial contributions to the improvement of natural knowledge". He was also elected a Member of the National Academy of Sciences of the United States in 2014. In 2014 he was award the Edwin G. Conklin medal from the Society for Developmental Biology, recognising his extraordinary research contributions and mentorship in the field.
