= OakNorth Bank =

British private bank

OakNorth Bank plc
- Type: Private company
- Industry: Banking
- Founded: September 2015; 11 years ago London, England
- Founders: Rishi Khosla; Joel Perlman
- Headquarters: London, United Kingdom
- Key people: Lord Adair Turner (Chairman); Rishi Khosla (CEO)
- Revenue: ▲£309.9 million (2025)
- Operating income: ▲£214.8 million (2024)
- Net income: ▲£159.3 million (2024)
- Number of employees: 278 (2024)
- Website: oaknorth.co.uk

OakNorth Bank is a British bank for scaling businesses (typically with between £1m–£100m in turnover) that provides loans and both business and personal savings accounts. The bank, which gained regulatory approval in early 2015, was founded by entrepreneurs Rishi Khosla and Joel Perlman, who had previously founded Copal Amba.

== History ==
OakNorth Bank secured a full banking licence from the Prudential Regulation Authority (PRA) and the Financial Conduct Authority (FCA) in March 2015, and launched flexible debt financing and a range of savings accounts six months later in September 2015.

Until December 2023, the Board was chaired by Cyrus Ardalan, former vice-chairman of public policy and government relations at Barclays Bank. In January 2024, Lord Adair Turner, the former Chairman of the Financial Services Authority (now the Financial Conduct Authority) was appointed Chairman of OakNorth. He had previously held the role of senior independent advisor on the OakNorth Bank board from 2015, moving to the bank's advisory board in May 2017. The Board also includes Harvard Business School faculty member and ex-managing director of Bain Capital Edward "Ted" Berk and Robert Burgess. In February 2021, Rajesh Gupta, formerly CFO at Kensington Mortgages, joined OakNorth Bank as its CFO. OakNorth Bank also appointed Carolyn Schuetz, former Chief Operating Officer for Group Retail Banking at HSBC, and Timo Boldt, co-founder of Gousto, as Non-Executive Directors in July 2021 and August 2022 respectively. Nilan Peiris, currently of Wise, was appointed as a Non-Executive Director in August 2024.

The bank is also supported by an advisory board, consisting of Martin Stewart, the former Director of Banks, Building Societies & Credit Unions at the Bank of England, and Lord Philip Hammond, the former UK Chancellor.

In May 2016, OakNorth became the first bank to be fully hosted on the cloud after working with Amazon Web Services (AWS) to drive the development forward with the regulator.

In 2019, OakNorth raised $440 million from Softbank Vision Fund and Clermont Group.

In December 2021, OakNorth completed its first acquisition with a 100% takeover of accountancy cash flow provider, Fluidly. In October 2022, OakNorth Bank acquired a 50% stake in specialist property lenders ASK Partners, to deepen its support for UK housebuilders and property entrepreneurs.

In January 2023, OakNorth, alongside The Federation of Small Businesses (FSB) and other Fintech firms, wrote to the former British Secretary of State for Business and Trade, Grant Shapps, calling on him to improve small businesses' access to borrowing. The group warned that failure to do so could further damage the UK's economic growth prospects.

In March 2023, OakNorth submitted a rescue bid for the UK arm of Silicon Valley Bank, being described in The Times as a "white knight".

In April 2023, Sharon Miles was appointed as the Group Chief Operating Officer.

In March 2024, OakNorth announced its 2023 results, posting a pre-tax profit of £187.3m for the financial year; an increase of almost a quarter (23%) on 2022. In its results, the bank stated that it had provided over £1.7bn of new lending facilities in 2023, approximately 10% of which went to US businesses. Having begun to lend in the North American Market in 2023, the bank also announced that it had applied for a US representative office and was exploring acquisitions of American firms. OakNorth received regulatory approval for a US representative office in August 2024.

== Operations ==
OakNorth Bank has offices in London and Manchester as well as regional hubs in Birmingham, Bristol, Leeds and East Anglia.

In August 2024, the bank secured authorisation from the Federal Reserve and the New York State Department of Financial Services (NYDFS) for a Representative Office in New York.

== Loans ==
Since 2015, OakNorth Bank has lent over £10bn to businesses across the UK covering multiple sectors.

OakNorth Bank has provided loans to several household names including: Leon Restaurants, Raymond Blanc's Brasserie Blanc, Sticks n Sushi, The Alchemist, and Yotam Ottolenghi's eponymous restaurant and deli chain. Outside the bar and restaurant businesses, other high-profile names that OakNorth Bank has funded include Deliciously Ella, Z Hotels, Arora Group, Staycity, Beaverbrook, Mamas & Papas, Third Space, Total Fitness, Ultimate Performance, F1 Arcade and Inception Group.

== Savings ==
OakNorth Bank offers a range of savings accounts for both businesses and personal use, including a notice base rate tracker account, fixed term savings accounts, notice accounts and easy access accounts, as well as fixed rate and easy access cash ISAs. OakNorth Bank's savings accounts can be managed online and via its mobile app.

== Business banking ==
In November 2023, OakNorth announced its move into business banking, offering tailored products and services to support the growth of businesses with over £1m turnover, assets over £1m if operating in real estate, or those ready to deposit £100k or more. Customers are assigned an OakNorth Business Partner to help them achieve their specific, strategic business goals.

== Awards ==
In 2020, OakNorth Bank won:

- MoneyComms Best Internet Savings Provider and was Highly Recommended for Best Internet Account Provider at the Moneyfacts Awards.

In 2020, Financial Times also ranked the company at #1 on their list FT 1000: Europe's Fastest Growing Companies 2020.

In 2021, OakNorth Bank won:

- Credit Team of the Year at the MoneyAge National Credit Awards.
- Senior Housing Capital Partner at the HealthInvestor Seniors Housing Awards.
- The 'Investment Award' category at The Estates Gazette Tech Awards.

In 2022, OakNorth Bank won:

- The 'Professional Services – Finance' category at TheBusinessDesk's Business Masters Awards in Yorkshire, East Midlands and West Midlands.
- The 'Alternative Finance Provider of the Year' and 'Private Equity/Venture Capital Deal of the Year' awards at the Insider Media Central & East Dealmakers Awards.

In 2023, OakNorth bank won:

- The 'Best Savings Provider for Existing Customers' category at the Savings Champion Awards 2023.
- Credit Team of the Year and Business Lender of the Year at the MoneyAge National Credit Awards.
- European Mid-Market Lender and European Mid-Market Deal of 2023 (in partnership with ASK) at the Real Estate Capital Europe Awards

In 2024, OakNorth bank won:

- Editor's Pick of The World's Top 250 Fintech Companies: 2024 by CNBC.
