= Kikuë Tachibana =

Japanese-Austrian molecular biologist

Kikuë Tachibana (born 1978 in Graz, Austria) is a Japanese-Austrian molecular biologist and director at the Max Planck Institute of Biochemistry (MPIB) in Martinsried, Germany. Formerly, she was a group leader at the Institute of Molecular Biotechnology (IMBA) in Vienna, Austria.

== Education and career ==
Tachibana was educated in Japan, Austria, and the UK. She obtained her PhD working on the cell cycle and cancer formation in the group of Ron Laskey at Cambridge University, UK. She later joined the lab of Kim Nasmyth in Oxford, UK as a post-doc, where she did pioneering work on the role of the protein cohesin in female mouse germ cells. In November 2011 she joined IMBA as a group leader, where she investigates totipotency in mouse oocytes and zygotes as well as the role of maternal aging on egg cell health using mouse as a model system. She became research director at the Max Planck Institute of Biochemistry in 2021.

== Awards and honours ==
In 2017, Tachibana was awarded the Walter Flemming medal. In 2018, she received the Förderpreis der Stadt Wien, an award from the city of Vienna for outstanding scientific work.

== Selected publications ==
- Tachibana-Konwalski, Kikuë (March 2017). "Single-nucleus Hi-C reveals unique chromatin reorganization at oocyte-to-zygote transition" Nature. 544 110-114. This article has been cited 891 times according to Google Scholar.
- Tachibana-Konwalski, Kikuë (February 2016). "Chromosome Cohesion Established by Rec8-Cohesin in Fetal Oocytes Is Maintained without Detectable Turnover in Oocytes Arrested for Months in Mice." Current Biology. 26 5, 678-685.
