= Ellora Patnaik =

Canadian actress and dancer

- Born: September 5, 1968 (age 57); Toronto, Ontario, Canada
- Occupations: Actress and Odissi dancer
- Years active: 1990–present

Ellora Patnaik (born September 5, 1968) is a Canadian actress of film, stage and television as well as an Odissi dancer.

== Early life ==
She was born in Toronto, Ontario, Canada, the first child of her parents, Promod and Chitralekha Patnaik; she is seven years older than her brother Devraj Patnaik. Her parents were born in the state of Orissa (now Odisha), India, and immigrated to Canada in the 1960s. Patnaik made numerous trips to India with her family in her youth.

Her parents soon moved to Oakville, Ontario, and then to Burlington, Ontario, where she attended M. M. Robinson High School.

In 1986, she was selected for training by (late) Padma Vibhushan Kelucharan Mohapatra, and went to study at the Odissi Research Centre in Orissa, India.

== Dance training ==
Patnaik's first and primary dance guru was her mother, who began training her as an Odissi dancer from a very young age. She has also received training from such notables as (late) Padma Shri Pankaj Charan Das, (late) Padma Vibhushan Kelucharan Mohapatra, Padma Shri Sanjukta Panigrahi and Padma Shri Gangadhar Pradhan.

=== Odissi dance teacher ===
Patnaik has taught Odissi dance since the mid-1980s. In the early 1990s, she took over as the executive director of the Chitralekha Dance Academy.

== Acting career ==
She attended the American Academy of Dramatic Arts from 1992 to 1994 and was a member of the company in her third year.

In 2009, she played Jyoti Mehta, Indie Mehta's mother, in the Canadian television series How to Be Indie on YTV, she filmed another season in 2010.

== Filmography ==
=== Film ===
| Year | Film | Role | Notes |
|---|---|---|---|
| 1990 | Daiba Daudi | Bobby | Odia movie, credited as Elora |
| 1998 | My Own Country | Rajani Verghese | Television film |
| 2000 | Tapish | Lajwati 'Laji' | Hindi movie |
| 2003 | Open House | Young Woman | |
| 2005 | Riding the Bus with My Sister | Girl on Bus | |
| 2008 | Toronto Stories | Caroline | |
| 2008 | Statues Come to Life | Statue | |
| 2016 | Killing Mommy | Detective Morse | |
| 2018 | Pride, Prejudice, and Mistletoe | Beverly | |
| 2020 | Kitty Mammas | Helen | |
| 2020 | Too Close for Christmas | Kim | |
| 2021 | One Small Visit | Elizabeth George | |
| 2025 | Calorie | Monika | |

=== Television ===
| Year | Title | Role | Notes |
|---|---|---|---|
| 2000 | The 7th Portal | Imitatia / Anna Nehue | |
| 2003 | Wild Card | Insurance Adjustor | |
| 2004 | Sue Thomas: F.B.Eye | Nurse | |
| 2006 | Billable Hours | Office Worker | |
| 2005-2006 | True Crimes: The First 72 Hours | Elaine Rupesh / Tara Mulla | |
| 2007 | The Gathering | Nurse | |
| 2008 | MVP | Hostess | |
| 2009 | Being Erica | Nurse | |
| 2009 | The Line | Nikki | |
| 2010 | Cra$h & Burn | Court Driver | |
| 2009-2011 | How to Be Indie | Mum (Jyoti) Mehta / Jyoti / Mum Mehta | |
| 2011 | Degrassi: The Next Generation | Nurse | |
| 2012 | Beauty and the Beast | Nurse | |
| 2016 | Orphan Black | Ultra Sound Technician | |
| 2016 | American Gothic | Dr. Donna Stanhope | |
| 2016 | Ride | Madhu | |
| 2016 | Conviction | Dr. Lorraine Martin | |
| 2017 | The Expanse | Ashanti | |
| 2017 | Murdoch Mysteries | Padma Bannerjee | |
| 2018 | Imposters | Dr. Grady | |
| 2018 | Condor | Tech Female | |
| 2018 | Guilt Free Zone | Veena | |
| 2018 | Pride, Prejudice and Mistletoe | Beverly | |
| 2018 | Coroner | Richie Singh | |
| 2019 | Talent Drivers | Sex Shop Attendant | |
| 2019 | The Bold Type | Priya | |
| 2019 | Titans | Ticket Agent | |
| 2019 | Hudson & Rex | Deena Roy | |
| 2020 | Spinning Out | Dr. Latner | |
| 2020 | Schitt's Creek | Funeral Director | |
| 2017-2020 | Kim's Convenience | Anjali Mehta | |
| 2020 | Nurses | Aalia Khan | |
| 2020 | The Wedding Planners | Deb | |
| 2021 | Ginny & Georgia | Bhanu | |
| 2021 | Sort Of | Raffo | |
| 2023 | Star Trek: Strange New Worlds | T'Pril | |

=== Theatre work ===
| Year | Title | Role | Theatre | Location |
|---|---|---|---|---|
| 1995 | Standing on My Knees | Catherine | | New York City, New York |
| 1997 | Naga Mandala | Rani | Tarragon Theatre | Toronto, Ontario |
| 2001 | Umrao Jaan Ada | Umrao | Rasik Arts | |
| 2004 | Left | Bobby | Rasik Arts | |
| | Say Goodnight Gracie | Catherine | | New York City, New York |
| | The Heidi Chronicles | Becky/Betsy | | New York City, New York |
| | The Country Wife | Lucy | | New York City, New York |
| | The Seagull | Housemaid | | New York City, New York |
| | The House of Blue Leaves | Little Nun | | New York City, New York |

=== Accolades ===
| Year | Award | Category | Nominee(s) | Result | Ref. |
|---|---|---|---|---|---|
| 2022 | Peabody Awards | Entertainment | Sort Of | Nominated | |

== See also ==
- List of Canadian actors
- List of dancers
- List of Indo-Canadians
- List of people from New York City
- List of people from Oakville, Ontario
- List of people from Odisha
- List of people from Toronto
