= Tani Dulay =

British real estate developer

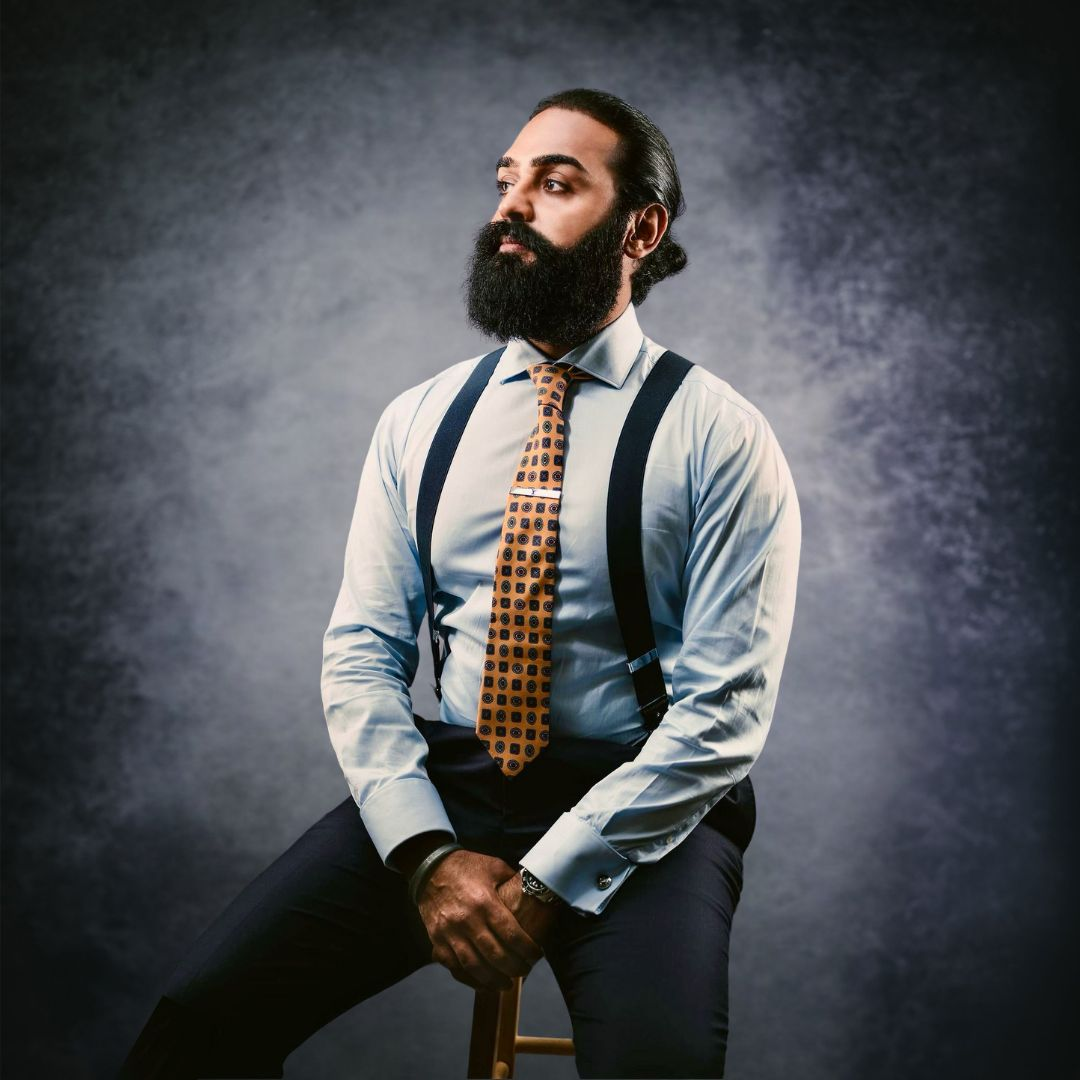
- Dulay in 2024

West Midlands Combined Authority
- Incumbent
- Assumed office 2025

Personal details
- Born: Tanvier Singh Dulay; 5 May 1992 (age 34) West Midlands, England
- Education: The University of Nottingham (BS) and Nottingham Trent University (MS)
- Occupation: CEO of Woodbourne Group
- Profession: Real estate developer
- Website: tanidulay.com

Tanvier Singh Dulay (born 5 May 1992) is a British businessman, real estate developer, and entrepreneur. He is the founder and chief executive officer (CEO) of Woodbourne Group, a United Kingdom-based property development and investment company. Dulay is a member of the West Midlands Combined Authority, and owns the £360m Curzon Wharf project in Birmingham.

Dulay is the developer behind the £4 billion Birmingham Knowledge Quarter, a project expected to deliver over 22,000 jobs, 4,800 new homes and life sciences.

== Education ==
Dulay was raised in Birmingham, West Midlands, England. He earned a Bachelor of Science from The University of Nottingham in 2013 and a Master of Science from Nottingham Trent University in 2014. During university, he had established a furniture import-export venture.

== Career ==
In 2016, Dulay began acquiring parcels for what would become the Curzon Wharf development, eventually consolidating four adjacent sites. He bought sections of the site from Nuffield College, Oxford and Downing.

Dulay formally established Woodbourne Group in 2019. He expanded the company’s project pipeline to hundreds of millions of pounds in developments, including Curzon Wharf. The Curzon Wharf project has attracted international attention for its net-zero goals.

In 2022, Dulay founded Woodbourne Ventures, an early-stage venture capital and accelerator arm of the company. Dulay is also involved in philanthropic initiatives, notably raising £500,000 for charity as part of a Birmingham fundraising campaign.

In 2023, Dulay joined 100 business owners who lobbied Prime Minister Rishi Sunak for a lack of new climate change duties for planning decisions. That same year in the House of Commons' 2023 Autumn Budget, Dulay's Woodbourne was noted for its role in the West Midlands Investment Zone for a £70 million anchor investment in the Birmingham Knowledge Quarter.

In 2024, Dulay spoke at Aston University's graduation ceremony.

In early 2025, Dulay was appointed to the West Midlands Mayor’s Taskforce. In 2025, he announced the Birmingham Knowledge Quarter, a £4 billion innovation district backed by the UK Government, a joint project between Woodbourne, Aston University, Birmingham City University, Bruntwood SciTech and Birmingham City Council.

== Filmography ==
=== Television ===
Television appearances and roles
Year	Title	Role	Notes
2025	Built in Birmingham: Brady & the Blues	Himself	

== Personal life ==
Dulay is of British Sikh heritage and a third generation Punjabi. He attributes his work to traditional Sikh values.
