= Inderjit Vasudevan Moorthy =

Canadian businessman (born 1982)

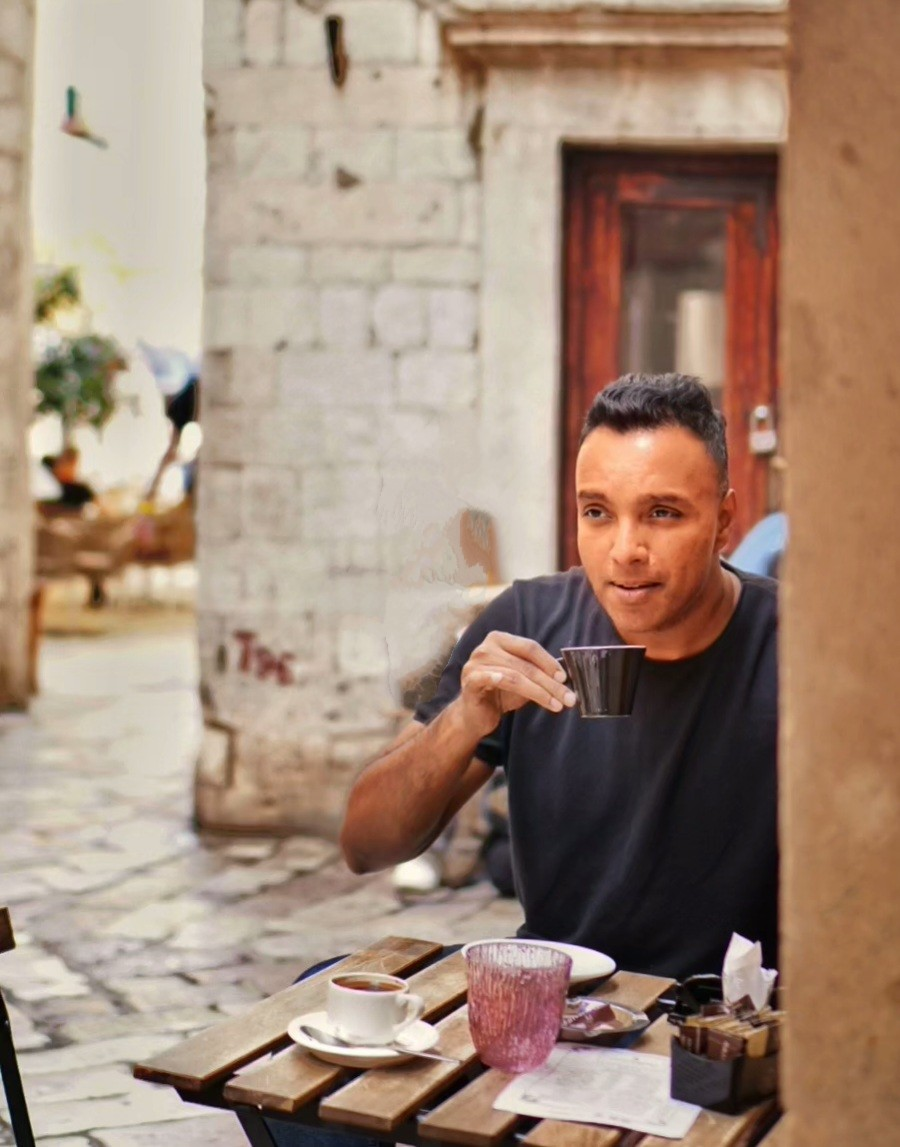
- Born: Inderjit Vasudevan Moorthy; 24 October 1982 (age 43); Chennai, India
- Occupations: Founder and CEO, Muster Technologies, Inc
- Spouse: Divya Karunakaran (m. 2014)
- Website: www.gotomuster.com//

Inderjit (born 24 October 1982) is an Indo Canadian entrepreneur and is also the founder and CEO of Muster Technologies, Inc.

== Early life ==
Inderjit Vasudevan Moorthy was born in Chennai, Tamil Nadu, to Vasudevan Moorthy and Kamala Moorthy. He grew up in Anna Nagar, located in the north-western part of Chennai and did his schooling at SBOA Matriculation and Higher Secondary School until he dropped out at the age of 15.

== Career ==
In business from the age of 19, Inderjit started his career as a managing partner in a multimedia company named Black box which worked primarily on 2d-3d graphics. Other successful ventures of Inder include Second Satellite Business process outsourcing services and Treetop Consultancy Services, which were focused on providing voice and non-voice based BPO.

Inderjit was quick to realize the business potential of social media branding and marketing, and he started as a freelance Social Media marketing agent in early 2010. Inder later partnered with one of the retail chain to start a Social media agency named IA Consulting which was later re-branded as Ikebana Consulting.

Inderjit has his own share of contribution towards technology and Mobile applications. His latest venture Muster which was launched in mid-April is receiving good response from IOS and the Android users and has reached 100,000 plus downloads from across the world. He explains that there is still a lot of scope left to be exploited when it comes to social dining. "Connecting with strangers and bonding over food is a sure shot way to make new friends!" In his own words.

== Personal life ==
Inderjit did not complete High school.

In March 2014, he married Divya Vk and shortly thereafter moved to Toronto, Ontario, Canada. He got naturalised and obtained Canadian citizenship in the year 2022.
