= Page Industries =

Indian manufacturer and retailer of garments

- Company type: Public
- Traded as: NSE: PAGEIND; BSE: 532827
- Founded: 1994
- Headquarters: Bangalore, Karnataka, India
- Key people: Sunder Genomal (Chairman)
- Revenue: ▲₹4,935 crore (US$580 million) (FY25)
- Net income: ▲₹729 crore (US$86 million) (FY25)
- Number of employees: 22,564 (including 3,103 contractual employees) (March 2024)
- Website: pageind.com

Page Industries Limited is an Indian manufacturer and retailer of innerwear, loungewear and socks, headquartered in Bangalore. It is the exclusive licensee of Jockey International in India, Sri Lanka, Nepal, Bangladesh, the United Arab Emirates, Oman, Qatar, Maldives and Bhutan. In 2011, it licensed Speedo swimwear from Pentland Group for India and Sri Lanka.

The company was founded in 1994 by Sunder Genomal and his brothers Nari and Ramesh, and together they hold a 54% stake in it. It has 14 operational manufacturing plants in India- 5 in Bangalore, 3 in Hassan, 2 in Mysore and 1 each in Tiptur, Gauribidanur,Tiruppur and K.R. Pet as of March 2024.
