= Ashok Venkitaraman =

British cancer researcher

- Education: Christian Medical College Vellore, University of London
- Awards: Fellow of the Academy of Medical Sciences (2001); Basser Global Prize (2017)
- Academic career
- Fields: Immunology, Oncology, Molecular biology, Chemical biology
- Institutions: Cancer Science Institute of Singapore National University of Singapore A*STAR Singapore Medical Research Council (MRC) Cancer Unit University of Cambridge MRC Laboratory of Molecular Biology
- Thesis: The regulation of MHC class 2 gene expression by tumours of the B lymphocyte lineage
- Doctoral advisor: Marc Feldmann
- Website: https://www.csi.nus.edu.sg/web/ashok-venkitaraman/ https://www.a-star.edu.sg/imcb/people/ashok-venkitaraman

Ashok Venkitaraman is a British cancer researcher. He is the director of the Cancer Science Institute of Singapore, a Distinguished Professor of Medicine at the National University of Singapore, research director at the Institute of Molecular & Cell Biology, and chief scientist for biomedical research at A*STAR, Singapore. From 1998 to 2020, he was the inaugural holder of the Ursula Zoellner Professorship of Cancer Research at the University of Cambridge, and a professorial fellow at Pembroke College, Cambridge. He was from 2006 to 2019 the director of the Medical Research Council Cancer Unit.

== Biography ==
Venkitaraman learnt and practiced medicine at the Christian Medical College, Vellore, India, later earning his PhD at University College London supervised by Sir Marc Feldman. Awarded a Beit Memorial Fellowship in 1988, he joined Michael Neuberger at the MRC Laboratory of Molecular Biology in Cambridge, transitioning to join its research faculty in 1991. In 1998, he was elected as the first holder of the Ursula Zoellner Professorship

Venkitaraman joined the MRC Cancer Unit in 2000, rising to become its co-director with Ron Laskey in 2006, and its director, in 2010. During his directorship, he developed a distinctive scientific mission for the MRC Cancer Unit focused on early intervention in cancer, through research that advances understanding of early steps in carcinogenesis, and utilizes this new knowledge for the early detection of cancer, and improvements in therapy or prevention.

In 2020, Venkitaraman took up joint appointments as the director of the Cancer Science Institute of Singapore, Distinguished Professor of Medicine at the National University of Singapore, and Research Director at A*STAR, Singapore. In 2025, he was appointed as the Chief Scientist for biomedical research at A*STAR.

Venkitaraman has mentored many leading researchers as Ph.D. students or postdoctoral fellows in his laboratory, including Ketan J. Patel, Nabieh Ayoub, Matthew Garnett, David Yu, Hyunsook Lee, Vihanda Wickramasinghe, and Xinyi Su.

== Research ==
Venkitaraman is widely recognised for advancing our understanding of the genetics and biology of human cancer, particularly in elucidating the impact of genome instability on carcinogenesis and cancer therapy. He is best known for discovering how mutations affecting the breast cancer gene, BRCA2, and related proteins cause genome instability to trigger carcinogenesis. His work has helped to explain why carriers of BRCA2 mutations develop cancer, and has provided the scientific foundations for new cancer therapies by illuminating fundamental cellular mechanisms that control genome repair, duplication and segregation.

Venkitaraman was amongst the first to discover that the breast cancer gene, BRCA2, is essential to maintain the integrity of the genome when cells divide. He and his colleagues soon uncovered that BRCA2 enables cells to repair DNA breakage in an error-free manner by precisely controlling the assembly of the RAD51 recombination enzyme on its DNA substrates, and revealed the structural mechanism underlying this process. He subsequently discovered that BRCA2 is vital to prevent DNA breakage when genome replication becomes blocked or stalled, helping to explain why BRCA2-deficient cells spontaneously exhibit genome instability during cell division, and why BRCA2-deficient cancers become highly sensitive to drugs that block genome replication by causing DNA cross-links or gaps. These discoveries have laid a scientific foundation for the development of new treatments for cancers arising in patients who carry BRCA2 mutations, and also provided a conceptual framework for understanding other human genetic diseases in which genome instability is connected with predisposition to cancer.

Venkitaraman's research continues to unveil new ways in which BRCA2 and related genes work to preserve genome integrity, and to explain how patients who carry BRCA2 mutations become more susceptible to early-onset cancers. He and his colleagues have recently discovered that cells carrying a single copy of mutant BRCA2 become more susceptible to the mutagenic effects of aldehydes, a class of chemicals found pervasively in the environment and generated in cells through metabolic reactions. His recent work has demonstrated how reactive small-molecule metabolites like methylglyoxal can bypass Knudson’s ‘two-hit’ paradigm for tumor suppression by BRCA2. It highlights how alterations in glycolysis, a pathway fundamental to metabolic diseases like diabetes as well as carcinogenesis, can trigger genome-wide mutational patterns implicated in cancer initiation, opening avenues for cancer biology and prevention research.

Venkitaraman has developed technologies that help to identify and validate new targets for next-generation medicines against cancer and other diseases. Work in his laboratory laid the scientific foundations for the development of “protein interference” at PhoreMost, which he co-founded with Chris Torrance and Grahame Mckenzie. This new technology is now being widely applied in collaborations with major pharmaceutical companies. Venkitaraman's laboratory has also devised new approaches to target cellular pathways initiated by enzymes like protein kinases. For example, they have selectively interrupted intracellular signaling by blocking the molecular recognition of protein phosphorylation using small-molecule chemical tools, now being pursued by industry for anti-cancer therapy. He has worked extensively with UK industry to develop new medicines. Having served for many years on the scientific advisory boards of companies such as Astex Therapeutics and Cambridge Antibody Technology/MedImmune, he currently holds appointments with Sentinel Oncology and PhoreMost, as well as on the international scientific advisory board of the Chugai Pharmaceutical Company, a member of the Roche group.

Venkitaraman has worked for many years to promote biomedical research in India. He leads a collaborative research initiative with the National Center for Biological Sciences and inStem in Bangalore, in which new technology is being applied to help develop drugs against human diseases, now supported by the Gates Foundation. He has established an initiative for the application of quantitative and engineering approaches to biological systems, the Centre for Integrative Biology & Systems Medicine, at the Indian Institute of Technology-Madras, where he holds the Mehta Foundation Visiting Professorship.

== Awards and honours ==
- In 2001, Venkitaraman was elected a Fellow of the Academy of Medical Sciences, one of the four national academies of the United Kingdom.
- In 2004, he was elected a Member of the European Molecular Biology Organization (EMBO), awarded for research excellence and outstanding achievements in the life sciences.
- Venkitaraman was awarded in 2017 the Basser Global Prize in recognition of his discoveries concerning the breast cancer gene BRCA2.
- In 2025, Venkitaraman was elected as a Fellow of the Academy of the American Association for Cancer Research, awarded to those whose work has made a profound and lasting impact on cancer research and related fields.
