= Neilank Jha =

Canadian neurosurgeon

Neilank Jha (Hindi: नीलंक झा) is a Canadian neurosurgeon specializing in concussions. Based in the city of Toronto, Neilank Jha established KonKussion, a hotline to address concussion injuries, which is staffed by neurosurgeons and neurologists to provide medical prognoses and treatment plans to physicians and nurses. In addition, Jha has pioneered clinical management guidelines for concussions through working with others in his field, internationally. Neilank Jha also established the first academic journal dedicated to the research of concussions.

== Early life and career ==
Neilank was born in Edmonton, Alberta and grew up in Regina, Saskatchewan where he had a passion for playing hockey. At age twelve, he moved to India, where he lived in an ashram until he was seventeen. Through his monastic experience in South Asia, Neilank Jha practiced asceticism, sleeping on the floor and owning only two sets of clothes.

Upon his return to Canada, Neilank pursued his undergraduate studies at the University of Toronto, medical school and neurosurgical residency at McMaster University, and spinal surgery fellowship at the University of Toronto.

At McMaster University, Neilank Jha was the chief resident in neurosurgery in 2010 when his mother, herself a nurse, suffered a concussion after falling down a flight of stairs. Her CAT scan was normal and she was diagnosed with a concussion and discharged from the hospital a few hours later and advised to return to work in a few days. She was unable to return to work as a nurse due to “persistent cognitive challenges and headaches”. Months later with no explanation for her persistent symptoms, no objective diagnostic tool or proven treatment she remained off work. This experience resulting in Neilank dedicating his life to concussion management and research, a departure from his extensive training in operating on the brain and spine.

Neilank has become an advocate for patients with concussions and has urged professional sports leagues to invest in R&D and better protocols to protect current and future athletes while also committing resources for retired athletes." Neilank has encouraged the responsible management of concussions in both athletes and non-athletes.

== Research ==
Neilank Chaired an International Concussion Conference in Toronto in September 2015 and published a white paper entitled ‘Solving the concussion crisis’, co-authored by others in the field. The publication "finalize[s] an international consensus by which concussive traumatic brain injuries are understood".

Neilank has conducted research evaluating the potential therapeutic benefit of cannabinoids in the management of traumatic brain injury. Early human studies have demonstrated encouraging results and additional studies are pending.

== KonKussion ==
Neilank Jha established KonKussion, a hotline to address concussion injuries, which is staffed by neurosurgeons and neurologists to provide medical prognoses and treatment plans to physicians and nurses. Neilank Jha personally attends to 200 concussion cases per week through KonKussion.
