= Tad Murty =

Canadian oceanographer (1937–2018)

Tadepalli Satyanarayana Murty
- Born: 1937; India
- Died: 2018 (aged 80–81)
- Education: University of Chicago
- Scientific career
- Fields: Oceanography
- Workplaces: University of Ottawa
- Thesis: Thermal convection in vertical tubes with application to geophysical phenomena (1967)

Tad S. Murty (1937 – 2018) was an Indian-Canadian oceanographer and expert on tsunamis. He was the former president of the Tsunami Society. He was an adjunct professor in the departments of Civil Engineering and Earth Sciences at the University of Ottawa. Murty had a PhD degree in oceanography and meteorology from the University of Chicago. He was co-editor of the journal Natural Hazards with Tom Beer of CSIRO and Vladimir Schenk of the Czech Republic.

== Climate change ==
He had taken part in a review of the 2007 Intergovernmental Panel on Climate Change.

Murty characterized himself as a global warming skeptic. In an August 17, 2006 interview, he stated that "I started with a firm belief about global warming, until I started working on it myself...I switched to the other side in the early 1990s when Fisheries and Oceans Canada asked me to prepare a position paper and I started to look into the problem seriously." Murty also stated that global warming is "the biggest scientific hoax being perpetrated on humanity. There is no global warming due to human anthropogenic activities." Murty was among the sixty scientists from climate research and related disciplines who authored a 2006 open letter to Canadian Prime Minister Stephen Harper criticizing the Kyoto Protocol and the scientific basis of anthropogenic global warming.

He has never published a scientific study against anthropogenic climate change and has been accused of receiving fossil fuel money.

Murty died on 2018, at the age of 80–81.
