= Samir Bhamra =

British actor, costume designer, director, playwright and producer

- Born: 7 September 1975 (age 51); Kenya
- Citizenship: British
- Occupations: Playwright; Film Maker; Theatrical Director; Costume Designer

Samir Bhamra is a British artist, playwright, costume designer, producer, and film and theatre director. He is the founder of the arts charity Phizzical CIO.

Bhamra graduated from Loughborough University with a BSc. in Mathematics and Computation.

Bhamra is the Creative Director of the UK Asian Film Festival.

His writing and directing credits include the West End concert Bombay Superstars at His Majesty’s Theatre, the biggest stage adaptation in the world of the Ramayana at Wembley Arena, Bombay Superstar and Precious Bazaar. Other notable touring productions include the Laurence Olivier Awards nominated play 10 Nights by Shahid Iqbal Khan and an academically acclaimed production of William Shakespeare's Cymbeline.

He was the 2021 Senior Producer at Belgrade Theatre Coventry where he delivered 12 productions across different media with a budget of £2.5 million as part of the theatre's UK City of Culture 2021 programme and the Programme Manager on the East Midlands 2012 Cultural Olympiad between 2010 and 2011. He subsequently delivered 3 large scale projects in the East Midlands for the Cultural Olympiad in 2012, including the Carnival parade in 6 cities for the London 2012 Olympic Torch.

== Musicals ==
In 2024, Bhamra was selected to be part of the Cove Park International Musical Theatre residency with partner's like National Theatre of Scotland, Dundee Repertory Theatre, National Centre for the Performing Arts and Tony Awards and Grammy Awards winning producers like Mara Isaacs to develop a new musical with Devesh Sodha and Robby Khela.

In 2022, Bhamra wrote, designed and produced his dream production Bombay Superstar co-produced with the Belgrade Theatre Coventry and The New Wolsey Theatre in Ipswich with musical director Hinal Pattani and musicians The 515 Crew. The cast included Nisha Aaliya, Pia Sutaria, Sheetal Pandya, Amar, Chirag Rao, Yanick Ghanty, Robby Khela, Rav Moore, Daisy Hardy, Alexandra Adams, Aaron Mistry and Pavan Maru.

In 2019, he directed Stardust at Belgrade Theatre in Coventry based on songs by Robby Khela, composed by Devesh Sodha with a book co-written with playwright Shahid Iqbal Khan. Stardust is a finalist for the 2020 Asian Media Awards Best Stage Production award. Samir worked with actor, singer and songwriter Robby Khela in Bring on the Bollywood, Cymbeline and previously Jean Genet's The Maids.

His first musical was Precious Bazaar which opened in 2004 at The Y in Leicester, which featured 10 performers who took part in a BollyIdol contest he developed with BBC and B4U. EastEnders actress Rakhee Thakrar played the lead role Suhani in Precious Bazaar. Precious Bazaar was nominated for a Windrush Award in 2004.

== Theatre ==
During the World Shakespeare Festival, he was seconded to the Royal Shakespeare Company from the National Theatre programme Step Change. His Bollywood styled production of Cymbeline toured for 12 weeks to 22 venues in England, Wales and Northern Ireland, and was the longest theatrical tour by any British Asian theatre company. The production received generally positive reviews.

Bhamra has directed an adaptation of Layla and Majnun and Romeo and Juliet in 2006 titled Romeo + Laila, and produced Omar Khan's adaptation of Twelfth Night titled What You Fancy which was directed by Leylah. In 2008, Samir directed the 1994 Pulitzer Prize nominated play A Perfect Ganesh written by Terrence McNally. He developed the ideas behind the play as part of in Residence at Haymarket Theatre.

Samir is currently researching and developing a production of William Shakespeare's The Winter's Tale set in Kashmir.

== Dance ==
Samir was the first judge of the UK version of Boogie Woogie and set the judging format which was followed from 2004 to 2008. Bhamra was a guest judge in the preliminary stages of Just Dance with Hrithik Roshan. Bhamra has been judging Just Bollywood, a Bollywood dance competition organised by Imperial University for students from all UK wide universities since 2015. He is a mentor to young adults to nurture their personal best.

Bhamra produced Subhash Viman's triple bill contemporary dance work Gamechanger, featuring Morphed, Fly From and Three. In 2018, he produced BBC Young Dancer finalist Anaya Vasudha's EKA which premiered at The Place.

== Cultural Strategy ==
Samir was one of many cultural leaders who developed a new cultural strategy for Leicester. for the City of Leicester.

== Awards ==
Samir Bhamra was one of the winners of the Olwen Wymark award from the Writers Guild of Great Britain in 2021. He won several global awards for costume design and directing his first short musical film Mad About The Boy, screened in Shanghai, Manila, Toronto, Cannes, and at the Queen Palm International Film Festival in California. He won the Arts and Culture Awareness award for his extensive work at the 2016 British Indian Awards in association with BDO. Precious Bazaar was nominated for a Windrush Arts Award in 2004. Samir received two High Commendations at the 2003 and 2004 Windrush Awards for his pioneering work in Digital, Internet and Technology.
