= Rishi Khosla =

British entrepreneur (born 1975)

Rishi Khosla OBE
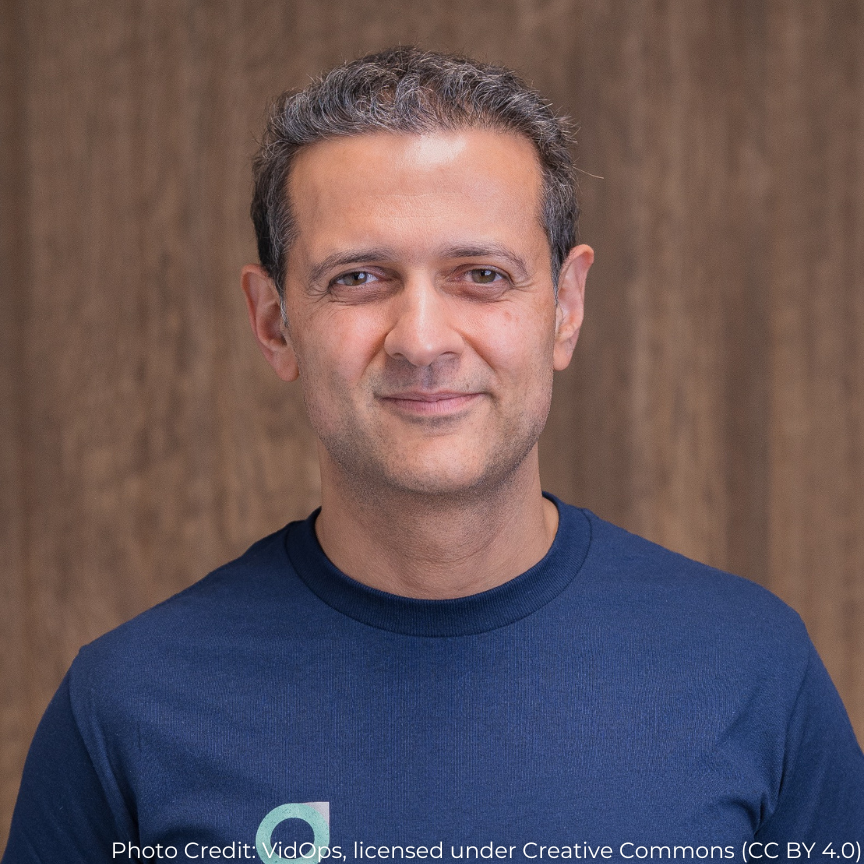

CEO of the OakNorth Bank

Personal details
- Born: 1975 (age 50–51)
- Children: Four
- Education: University College London

Rishi Khosla OBE (born September 1975) is a British CEO and cofounder of OakNorth Bank.

== Early life and education ==
Khosla was born in London, where his father earned a degree in engineering. During the early years of his life, Khosla's family moved to Delhi, India, where they lived in a small apartment with his grandparents and uncle's family.

In the 1980s, Khosla's family moved back to London, and he attended secondary school in South Harrow. During this time, his father worked as a businessman selling construction equipment in the Middle East.

In 1992, aged 17, Khosla attended University College London (UCL), where he received a BSc undergraduate degree in economics. He then received a master's degree in Accounting & Finance from The London School of Economics (LSE).

== Career ==
After graduating from LSE, Khosla began his career at the Dutch bank ABN AMRO in 1995 before joining GE Capital in 1999.

Prior to establishing his own company, Khosla worked for Indian steel magnate Lakshmi Mittal, where he managed a private equity venture portfolio for the Mittals that invested in fintech companies. It was during this time that Khosla became an early-stage investor in PayPal.

In 2011, Moody's Corporation acquired a majority stake in Copal Partners before eventually purchasing the company in 2014.

In 2015, Khosla and Perlman launched their second business together, OakNorth Bank. In March 2015, the company secured a full banking license from the Prudential Regulation Authority (PRA) and the Financial Conduct Authority (FCA), becoming the third new UK bank in over 150 years.

== Awards ==
In 2011, Khosla was one of the recipients of the Ernst & Young Entrepreneur of the Year Award. In 2020, he entered the Order of the British Empire at Queen Elizabeth II’s New Year Honours for business service.

== Personal life ==
Khosla married Milan in 2000 and they have four children.
