= Abishur Prakash =

Canadian futurist and author (born 1991)

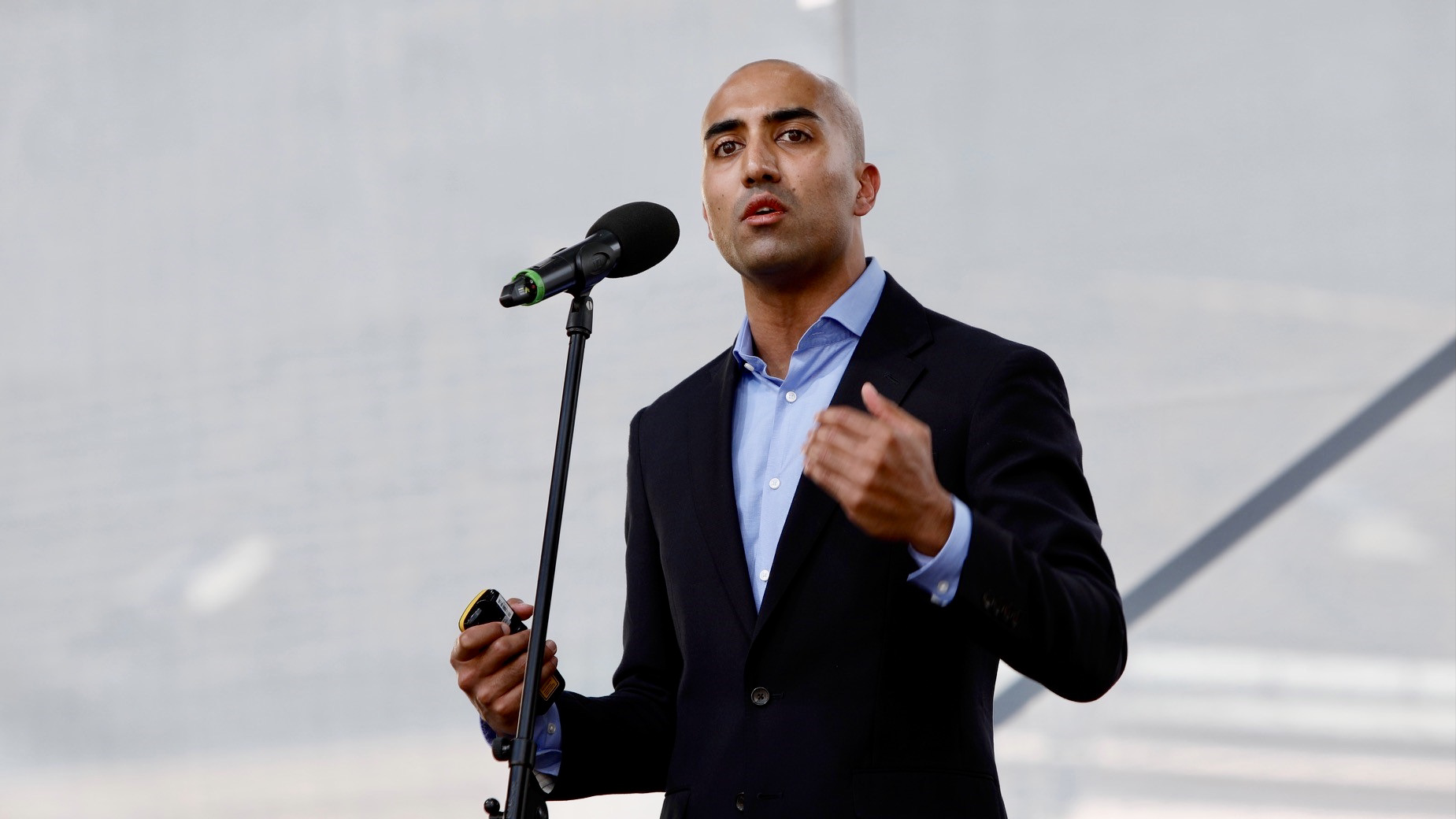
- Born: September 21, 1991 (age 34); New Zealand
- Education: Ryerson University (now Toronto Metropolitan University)
- Website: abishurprakash.com

Abishur Prakash (born September 21, 1991) is a Canadian businessman, author, and geopolitical expert. He is the chief executive officer and founder of The Geopolitical Business, an advisory firm based in Toronto, Canada. Prior to this, he worked as a futurist at Center for Innovating the Future, a foresight agency.

== Early life and education ==
Prakash was born in New Zealand to parents from India. He had his childhood in Australia and grew up in Canada.

Prakash has a B.A. in "Politics and Governance" from Ryerson University (now Toronto Metropolitan University).

== Career ==
In 2013, Prakash joined Center for Innovating the Future (CIF), a foresight practice based in Toronto, Canada. His work at CIF has been cited by the World Economic Forum, Brookings Institution, the Foreign Policy Research Institute and the Ministry of Foreign Affairs and International Cooperation (United Arab Emirates). In 2017, Prakash represented CIF in a public testimony to the Senate of Canada.

In 2023, Prakash started The Geopolitical Business, a geopolitical advisory firm in Toronto.

== Bibliography ==
- Next Geopolitics: The Future of World Affairs (Technology) Volume One (2016) ISBN 978-0-9958339-1-3
- Next Geopolitics: The Future of World Affairs (Technology) Volume Two (2017) ISBN 978-0-9958339-2-0
- Go.AI (Geopolitics of Artificial Intelligence) (2018) ISBN 978-0-9958339-4-4
- The Age of Killer Robots (2020) ISBN 978-0-9958339-6-8
- The World Is Vertical: How Technology Is Remaking Globalization (2021) ISBN 978-0-9811821-7-9

=== Reception ===
Prakash's book, Go.AI (Geopolitics of Artificial Intelligence), was reviewed by the France-based think tank, French Institute of International Relations (IFRI), alongside Kai Fu Lee's “AI Superpowers: China, Silicon Valley, and the New World Order.” The book was also reviewed by Mandiner, Hetek and Origo (website).
