= Balwinder Rana =

Indian-British anti-racism activist

Balwinder Singh Rana (born 1947) is an Indian-British anti-racism and anti-fascism activist. He was a cofounder and the first president of the Indian Youth Federation in Gravesend, the first Indian youth organisation in the UK.

== Life ==
Originally from Punjab, India, Balwinder Rana moved to the United Kingdom aged 16, in December 1963. He joined his father and two older brothers to live in Gravesend, Kent. He spent five years working in factories, experiencing constant casual racism. While studying for his A Levels at Gravesend College, he remembers an upsurge in racism after Enoch Powell's 1968 Rivers of Blood speech.

Rana and other students set up the Indian Youth Federation in Gravesend in 1969, combining its public launch with Indian Independence Day celebrations. The group invited the local MP, mayor, and councillors, as well as those in professions with a reputation for making racist decisions: bank managers, headteachers and railway staff. The group helped inspire South Asians to set up Asian Youth Movements elsewhere in Britain through the 1970s and 1980s - for example, in Sheffield, Bradford, Birmingham and Luton.

Rana joined the Anti-Nazi League in 1977. He took part in the Battle of Lewisham, and went on to work full-time for the Anti-Nazi League. He was present at the 1993 Welling riots. He later helped to set up Sikhs Against the English Defence League, and to organize a 2011 Luton counter-demonstration against the EDL. In October 2018 Rana joined an Anti-Nazi League against the Democratic Football Lads Alliance:

That's the first time I'd seen 1,500 fascists [...] It’s important that people in communities know what’s happening and realise it’s not something that happened in the past. It’s happening right now.
