= Upinder Randhawa =

- Born: Australia
- Occupations: Film director, executive producer, reporter, presenter, actor
- Known for: Coverage of the 2011 England riots; CEO & Founder of Freedom Films Productions; Channel Head of NewsNumber.Com

Upinder Randhawa is a Film maker as well as a radio and television reporter and presenter working in the United Kingdom. He has also acted in four movies in India. He has worked as a director and produced KIRDAAR which is getting released worldwide. Randhawa also worked as a line producer and an executive producer in the film industry. He's the CEO & Founder of Freedom Films Productions and is currently working on some Bollywood productions as well as some ventures with his business partner Shahid Hasan and film maker Anees Bazmee.

Randhawa is also a Channel Head for NewsNumber.Com which is one of the biggest social journalism platforms. He has also launched his own music production and is working with his signed artists on music and film projects. Upinder Randhawa is a Film Director and an Executive Producer. He also run a Music Record Label under Freedom Records.

== Early life ==
Randhawa was born in Australia . After studying in Melbourne, Australia, and working for a short time in Delhi, he came to the United Kingdom in 2009.

== Career ==
Randhawa worked for several Asian community radio stations. He exposed a series of controversies regarding a breach of the Ofcom sponsorship rules by one Station at which he had worked.

Randhawa later worked as a presenter for UK lifestyle channel Sangat TV. He provided live coverage of the 2011 England riots within the West Midlands, spoke out against violence, and assisted police during the event. The Channel’s participation was commended by David Cameron in the House of Commons for its commitment to social responsibility.

Randhawa went on to appear in Street Riots: The Live Debate on Channel 4. He was also featured in "10 Heroes of the London Riots" in New York’s Time Magazine. In 2012 he appeared in a Punjabi film, Mirza – The Untold Story.

In 2013 Randhawa was a speaker at a Birmingham event to raise awareness of crimes against women in India.

Randhawa also covered sports events, including the international bodybuilding championship Sheru Classic. He was voted number 41 for DesiClub.com’s Top 50 Coolest Desis of 2011. He has interviewed various celebrities for punjab2000. In 2016 he also appeared in the film Desi Munde, released in October 2016.
