= Manoj Badale =

British Indian Businessman

Manoj Badale OBE
- Born: 31 December 1967 (age 58)
- Education: University of Cambridge
- Occupation: Businessman

Manoj Badale OBE (born 31 December 1967) is an Indian-born British businessman and venture business builder. He is the co-founder and managing partner of venture builder firm Blenheim Chalcot, the South African SA20 franchise Paarl Royals and the Caribbean CPL franchise Barbados Royals and he formerly owned Indian Premier League franchise Rajasthan Royals before selling that to UK-based Indian-born Lakshmi Mittal (75%) and Adar Poonawalla (18%) at valuation of US$1.63 billion. He currently has a 7% stake in Rajasthan Royals.

== Life ==
Badale was born in Dhule, to a rich Maharashtrian Marathi speaking family. He attended Haberdashers' Aske's Boys' School before attending the University of Cambridge, where he studied economics.

Badale founded the IT services company Agilisys in 1998.

In June 2018, Badale was appointed an OBE for services to the economy and charity.
