= Siramdasu Venkata Rama Rao =

British painter of Indian descent (born 1936)

- Born: 1936 (age 89–90); Gudiwada, Andhra Pradesh, India
- Occupation: Painter
- Known for: Art
- Spouse: Suguna
- Children: Padmavathi
- Awards: Padma Shri; Lord Croft Award; The Most Outstanding Artist in the Commonwealth

Siramdasu Venkata Rama Rao (born 1936) is a British painter of Indian descent, known for his cubist paintings. Holder of Commonwealth Fellowship of 1962, he was honored by the Government of India, in 2001, with the fourth highest Indian civilian award of Padma Shri.

== Biography ==
Rao, whose father was a wood carver and, later, builder, was born in Gudiwada, in the South India state of Andhra Pradesh, in 1936, His graduate studies were in Accounting and Banking in which he graduated from Andhra University in 1955. During this period, he studied art under the tutelage of K. Venugopal and later, under K Srinivasulu and secured a government diploma in Fine Arts in 1955 from Kalakshetra, Chennai. On the insistence of the progressive art director of the institution, Madhavapeddi Gokhale, he joined Madras School of Arts and Crafts, present day Government College of Fine Arts, Chennai for advanced training and passed a Fine Arts degree course in 1959. Simultaneously, he studied Economics and secured a second graduate degree from Andhra University.

His association with the renowned painter, K. C. S. Paniker, in Chennai, assisted him in his growth and he moved to New Delhi in 1959 under a Government of India research fellowship where he stayed till 1962. On receiving a Commonwealth Fellowship that year, Rao migrated to UK and studied at the Slade School of Fine Arts, University of London till 1965 under William Coldstream. The next two years were spent at London County Council as a teacher of painting and drawing. Later, in 1967, he shifted to US and passed the Master of Fine Arts (MFA) course from the University of Cincinnati in 1969 and concurrently taught at the university as a teaching assistant, a post he held till 1969. The next move was to Western Kentucky University as the professor of fine arts. Later, he moved his base to Chicago.

Rao's lithographs are found in the collections of Herbert Reed, Tate Gallery, London and the Metropolitan Museum of Art, New York. Some of his exhibitions have been co-hosted by renowned modern painters such as Pablo Picasso, Joan Miró, Max Ernst, Jackson Pollock, Georges Braque and Salvador Dalí and his paintings are sold by art auctioneers such as Bonhams and Rosebury's Fine Arts Auctioneers. His paintings are displayed at:

- Museum of Modern Art, New York
- Victoria and Albert Museum, London
- Museum of New Zealand Te Papa Tongarewa, Wellington
- Seattle Art Museum, Seattle
- Nuffield Foundation, London
- Linx House Foundation, Glasgow
- National Gallery of Modern Art, New Delhi
- British Council, London
- Asia House, New York
- Mobile Museum of Art, Alabama
- University of Cincinnati, Cincinnati
- Fogg Art Museum, Harvard University, Boston
- Kalamazoo Institute of Arts, Kalamazoo, Michigan
- Ford Foundation, New Delhi
- University of London, London
- Chitralaya State Art Gallery, Thiruvananthapuram
- Madras Museum, Chennai
- Lalit Kala Academy, Hyderabad
- India International Centre, New Delhi
- Salar Jung Museum, Hyderabad

Rao, who is also credited with publications on art and poetry, is married to Suguna and the couple has a daughter, Padmavathi, a known classical dancer of Bharatanatyam. He returned to India in 2003 and pursues his work there.

== Awards and recognitions ==
Rama Rao received the Lord Croft Award in 1962. Three years later, he was selected as The Most Outstanding Artist in the Commonwealth by the Second Commonwealth Biennial of Abstract Art Exhibition, held in London in 1965. A doctorate (DLitt, Honoris Causa) holder from the Potti Sreeramulu Telugu University, Hyderabad, Rao's biography is featured in the Outstanding Educators of America and Washington DC publication. The Government of India honoured him with the civilian award of Padma Shri in 2001.

== See also ==
- Pablo Picasso
- Joan Miró
- Max Ernst
- Jackson Pollock
- Georges Braque
- Salvador Dalí
- K. C. S. Paniker
