= Agilisys =

Software provider in London, England

Agilisys Holdings Ltd.
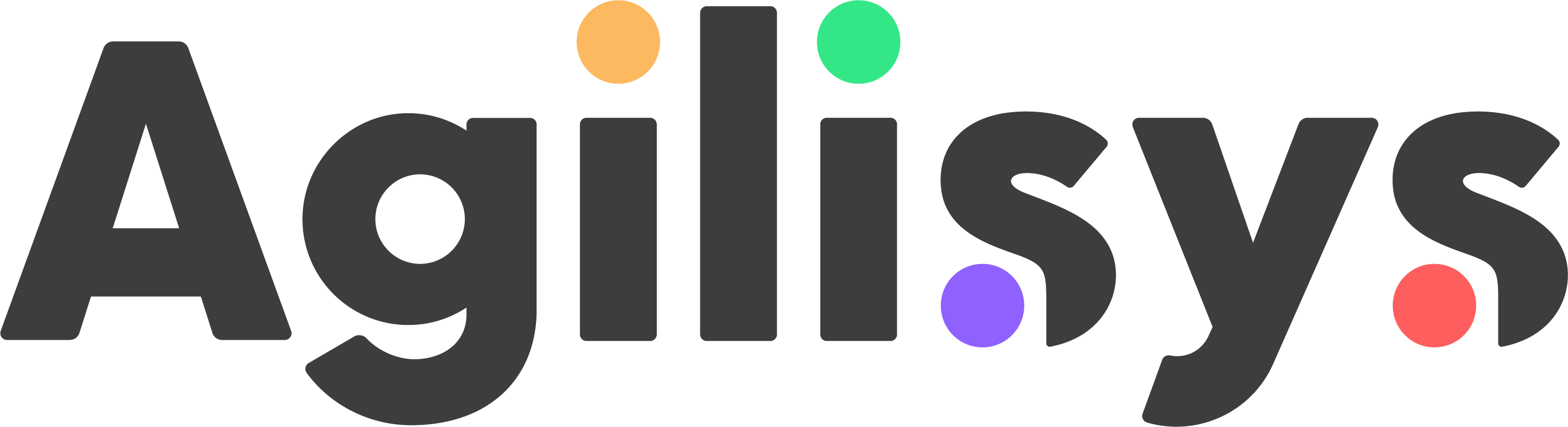
- Industry: IT Services
- Founded: 1998 in London, England
- Founders: Manoj Badale, Charles Mindenhall
- Headquarters: Wigan, UK
- Key people: Andrew Mindenhall (CEO)
- Products: "Citizen-centric technology products" as well as "centres of delivery excellence" around the UK.
- Number of employees: 1,500
- Parent: Blenheim Chalcot
- Website: www.agilisys.co.uk

Agilisys is an IT software and business services provider which has its headquarters in London, England with a focus in local government and citizen-centric technology products. Employing around 1,500 staff, it provides customer services, ICT and consulting services.

The company was started in 1998 by Manoj Badale and Charles Mindenhall. Its current structure being established in 2004, out of a merger between netdecisions, Agilisys Contact Services and Agilisys. Agilisys is part of a wider family of Blenheim Chalcot companies. In 2015, the company established itself as an employee-owned company through an Employee Ownership Trust.

== Company structure ==
=== Transformation ===
Agilisys Transformation is the consulting division of Agilisys. Agilisys Transform is a specialised division of Agilisys, focusing on leveraging Generative AI (GenAI) to enhance efficiency and service delivery within the public sector.

==== Community Cloud ====
Cloud Services were founded in 2011 as an Infrastructure as a Service (Iaas). Late 2016, Agilisys re-launched their cloud services operation under the brand Community Cloud. Community Cloud combines IT solutions, (IaaS, License Management, Outsource, Security, Desktop, SIAM, Mobility) to manage complex legacy systems and future applications.

== Operations ==
Agilisys was named in The Sunday Times Top Track 250 index for the fastest growing privately owned mid-market companies in Britain in 2013 and 2016. The annual Grant Thompson Top Track 250 recognises privately owned companies with significantly increasing year-on-year growth and is published in The Sunday Times each October.

Since its inception, Agilisys has worked both for the public sector (local and central government), third sector organizations and the private sector. It has established a number of strategic partnerships providing ICT and business services with local government authorities.

In 2026, Agilisys relocated its headquarters from London to Wigan town centre and is based out of the redeveloped Civic Centre.

=== Local government partnerships ===
In 2004, Agilisys entered an Incremental Strategic Partnership with the London Borough of Hammersmith & Fulham. In 2006, the joint venture company H&F Bridge Partnership (HFBP) was established through a ten-year deal between Agilisys and the council. This led to the creation of London's first shared services centre.

In 2005, Agilisys established a partnership with Cumbria County Council and together made a successful bid to run Consumer Direct North West, a provider of consumer advice services to citizens in 22 Local Authorities across the North West.

In 2009, Agilisys enters the Building Schools for the Future market with Sandwell Metropolitan Borough Council. The ten-year partnership has involved Agilisys transformation services, with a focus on increasing the use of 21st century ICT to the area.

In 2010 Agilisys enter into a Strategic Partnership with North Somerset Council to provide Customer Services, ICT, Revenues and Benefits, Finance, HR, Payroll and Facilities Management in a ten-year deal. The deal also saw Agilisys providing ICT support services to local schools.

In the same year, Agilisys create the Elevate East London partnership with the London Borough of Barking and Dagenham. This partnership contracted Agilisys to deliver ICT services, Revenues and Benefits, Customer Services, and Procurement for the council.

In 2012 Agilisys entered into a seven-year partnership with Tower Hamlets council to deliver its IT services in the form of new finance and HR systems, as well as support its transformation programme.

In 2012 Bristol City council selected Agilisys to implement and host a new integrated back office system. This involved the implementation of a new integrated Finance, HR and Asset management system as part of the City Council's transformation programme.

=== Central Government ===
Agilisys has worked with a number of central government agencies to meet their targets that have been set in line with the 'Digital by Default' agenda, announced in the 2012 government budget.

In 2014 Agilisys signed a contract with the Ministry of Justice and the Legal Aid Agency to deliver Civil Legal Advice contact centre services, based in North Somerset. The deal involved Agilisys delivering the Civil Legal Advice (CLA) Operator Service on behalf of the Legal Aid Agency. This services helps to determine whether people qualify for legal support.

Agilisys has completed proof of concept work for large central government agencies for improving processing benefits and records.

=== Third Sector ===
Agilisys has worked with third sector organisations to help them run their contact service provisions in contact centres across the UK. In 2011 Agilisys entered into a partnership with Citizens Advice Bureau to provide a consumer help service. Agilisys provides phone and online support from four contact centres totalling 180 seats across England and Wales.

In 2013 Agilisys was awarded a contract with Save the Children to provide support for the charity's "Eat Sleep Learn Play!" early intervention programme. The three-year deal sees Agilisys providing customer service support for the charity.

=== Healthcare ===
Agilisys provides Information Management and Technology (IM&T) strategy consultancy for organisations delivering health services to both the NHS and private sector to help them achieve their targets.

For BMI Healthcare, Agilisys is responsible for RIS-PACS across 50 sites throughout the UK.

In 2014 Agilisys and Quickheart, an Adult Social Care web services provider, signed a partnership deal.

In 2016 Agilisys became Top 13 in state generating $663M in revenue. The latest BC investment, HCR Debt Services, provides technology and business processes for reimbursement and debt recovery for the NHS.

== Awards ==
Agilisys, in partnership with the London Borough of Barking and Dagenham, was awarded the "Excellence in Partnership Working" prize at the Institute of Revenues Rating and Valuation (IRRV) performance awards in 2012 and in 2013 with the partnership between Agilisys and Hammersmith and Fulham council.

Agilisys Revenue Collection wins the top prize for ‘Excellence in Debt Management’ at the 2015 IRRV National Performance Awards with Sandwell Metropolitan Borough Council (MBC) and JBW Judicial Services Group
