= MRC Cancer Unit =

Cancer Research Institute at the University of Cambridge

Coordinates: 52.1770°N 0.1422°E

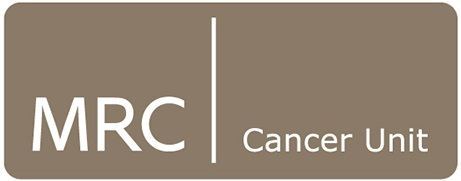
- Abbreviation: MRC CU
- Formation: 2001
- Dissolved: 2022
- Type: Research institute
- Legal status: University Unit
- Purpose: Cancer research in the UK
- Headquarters: Hutchison/MRC Research Centre
- Location: Cambridge Biomedical Campus, Cambridge, CB2 0XZ
- Region served: UK
- Director (interim): Rebecca Fitzgerald
- Parent organization: University of Cambridge and Medical Research Council
- Staff: c. 100 cancer research scientists and support staff
- Website: MRC Cancer Unit

The Medical Research Council Cancer Unit was located in Cambridge and was established in 2001. It was based within the Hutchison/MRC Research Centre, which in turn is situated on the Cambridge Biomedical Campus.

== History ==
The MRC Cancer Unit was established in 2001 (as the MRC Cancer Cell Unit) by Professor Ron Laskey CBE, who was also appointed as the unit's first director. Professor Laskey retired from the unit in 2010. His successor was Professor Ashok Venkitaraman, who had co-directed the unit from 2006 with Professor Laskey. As well as his position as director of the MRC Cancer Unit, Professor Venkitaraman was also the Ursula Zoellner Professor of Cancer Research within the University of Cambridge. In October 2013, the unit joined the University of Cambridge and changed its name to the MRC Cancer Unit. Professor Venkitaraman stepped down from the directorship in November 2019 to take up a new role as director of the Cancer Science Institute of Singapore. He was succeeded by Professor Rebecca Fitzgerald as the interim director. The MRC Cancer Unit was closed at the end of March 2022.

== Research areas ==
The unit had a general research focus on investigating the early stages of epithelial cancers, with an overall goal of improving the detection and treatment of these cancers. There were seven active research programmes in the Unit, which cover the following areas: chromosomal instability, Barrett's oesophagus and oesohago-gastric carcinoma, cell fate and cancer, lung tumour evolution, cancer metabolism, lymphatics and the tumour microenvironment, and cancer metastasis.
