= Sunder Genomal =

Indian businessperson, billionaire

- Citizenship: United Kingdom
- Education: De La Salle University
- Occupations: Businessperson, Founder & MD of Page Industries
- Organization: Page Industries
- Spouse: Madhuri
- Father: Genomal Verhomal

Sunder "Ashok" Genomal is a British-Indian businessperson, billionaire and Non-Executive Chairman of Page Industries, a Bangalore-headquartered garment company, founded in 1994. His company, Page Industries is one of the largest licensees in the world for underwear maker Jockey. As of 2019, Genomal has been ranked by Forbes as the 73rd wealthiest Indian, with an estimated net worth of approximately $1.9 billion. He was named the Ernst & Young Entrepreneur of the Year Award in 2017.

In 1994, Sunder Genomal founded Page Industries, along with his two brothers. The company is engaged in the manufacturing, distribution, and marketing of Jockey products. In India, Page Industries is also the exclusive licensee of swimwear brand Speedo.

== Personal life ==
He was born and brought up in Manila belonging to a family with Sindhi descent from Hyderabad. Holds the citizenship of United Kingdom. He holds a Master's degree in Science from De La Salle University.

He is married to Madhuri, and has a son named Shamir. Sunder Genomal's family is into innerwear business since 1959 when his father, Genomal Verhomal set up their first factory in the Philippines.

== Recognition ==
- Sunder Genomal was awarded the "India's Best CEO 2015" in the textiles category by Business Today (India) in December 2015.
- Forbes listed him as India's 95th richest with a net worth of $1.2 billion in 2016.
- In 2017, his estimated net worth was $1.75 billion and was placed #87th in Forbes's India Rich List 2017.
- In February 2018, Genomal was awarded EY Entrepreneur of The Year 2017 Award in the consumer products and retail category.
