= Ron Laskey =

British cell biologist and cancer researcher

Ron Laskey CBE FRS FMedSci
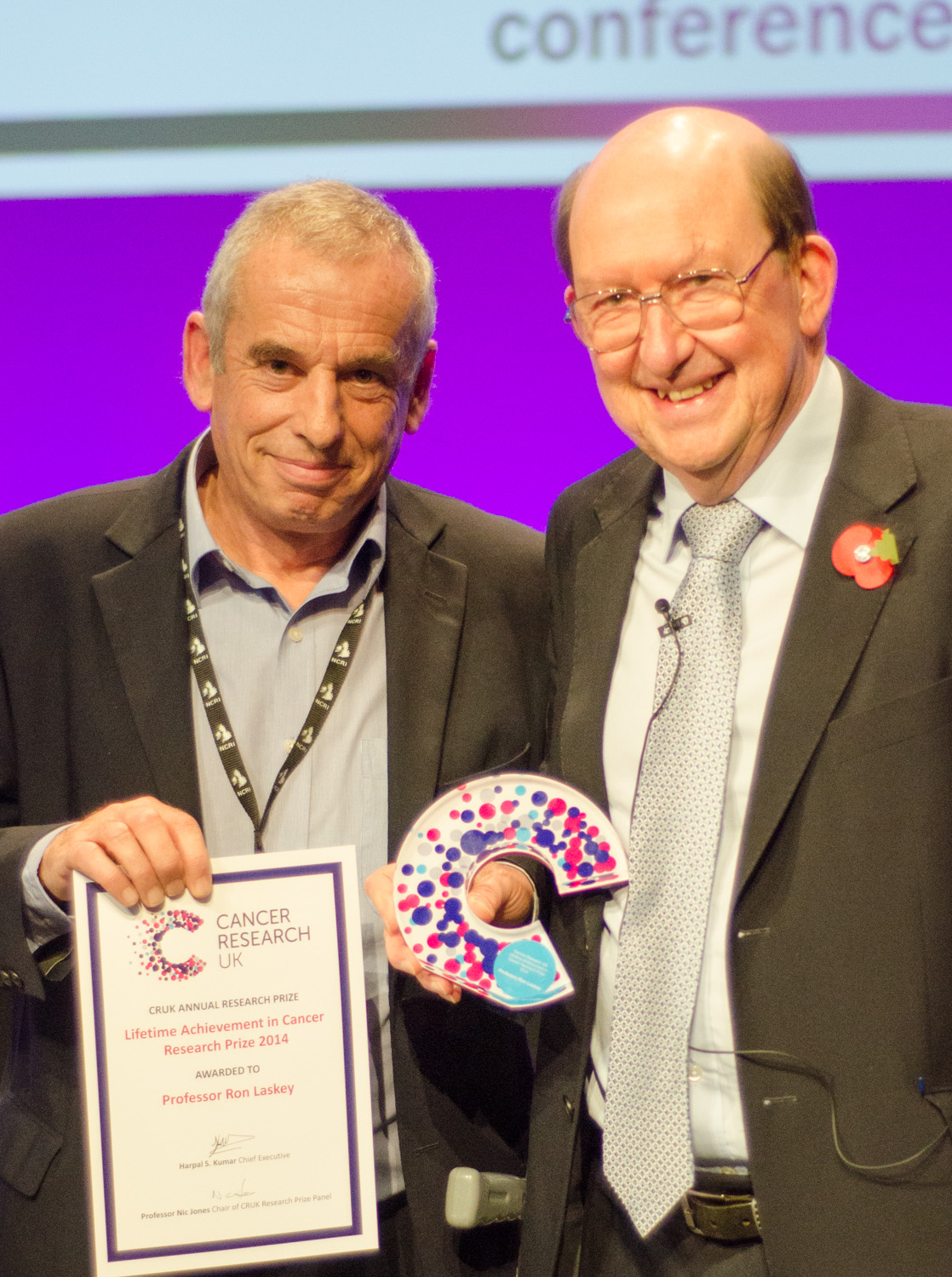
- Prof Laskey (right) presented with the 2014 Cancer Research UK Lifetime Achievement Prize by Chief Scientist Nic Jones
- Born: Ronald Alfred Laskey; 26 January 1945 (age 81)
- Education: Royal Grammar School, High Wycombe
- Alma mater: University of Oxford (DPhil)
- Spouse: Margaret Ann Page (m. 1971)
- Awards: Louis-Jeantet Prize for Medicine (1998); Colworth Medal
- Scientific career
- Thesis: Application of cell cultures to the study of differentiation in Xenopus laevis : effects of the environment on the proliferation and behaviour of differentiating amphibian cells (1970)
- Doctoral students: Richard Harland Kikuë Tachibana
- Website: www.zoo.cam.ac.uk/directory/professor-ron-laskey

Ronald Alfred Laskey CBE FRS FMedSci FLSW (born 26 January 1945) is a British cell biologist and cancer researcher.

== Career and research ==
Laskey was the Charles Darwin Professor of Embryology at the University of Cambridge. In 1991, he co-founded the Wellcome Trust/Cancer Research Campaign Institute (now known as the Wellcome Trust/Cancer Research UK Gurdon Institute), along with five other senior scientists including Professor Sir John Gurdon. In 2001, he founded the Medical Research Council Cancer Cell Unit in 2001, and was Director of the Unit until 2010. Laskey is also a Fellow of Darwin College, Cambridge.

=== Awards and honours ===
Laskey was appointed Commander of the British Empire (CBE) in the 2011 New Year Honours. Other significant honours include the Royal Society Royal Medal, for his "pivotal contributions to our understanding of the control of DNA replication and nuclear protein transport, which has led to a novel screening method for cancer diagnosis", and the Cancer Research UK Lifetime Achievement Prize.

- 1984: Elected Fellow of the Royal Society.
- 1998: Louis-Jeantet Prize for Medicine.
- 2000: Tomorrow's World award for health innovation.
- 2001: Croonian Lecture.
- 2009: Royal Society Royal Medal.
- 2011: Received an CBE in the New Year Honours list for services to Science.
- 2013: Elected Fellow of the Learned Society of Wales.
- 2014: Cancer Research UK Lifetime Achievement In Cancer Research Prize

== Personal life ==
Laskey married Margaret Ann Page in 1971. Laskey is an author, composer and singer of (mostly) science-based humorous songs, in the tradition of Tom Lehrer. Various combinations of these songs were published by the Cold Cold Spring Harbor Laboratory Press in three records: "Songs for Cynical Scientists" (audio cassette), More Songs for Cynical Scientists and Selected Songs for Cynical Scientists (CDs). Only the last-mentioned record is still available.
