= A Perfect Ganesh =

Play written by Terrence McNally

- Original language: English
- Written by: Terrence McNally
- Setting: India

Premiere
- Date: June 1993
- Place: New York City Center

A Perfect Ganesh is a play written by Terrence McNally which premiered Off-Broadway in 1993. Narrated by Ganesha, Hindu god of "wisdom, prudence, acceptance and love," it is the story of two friends, Margaret Civil and Katharine Brynne, who explore their differences, life-tragedies, and opinions during a healing trip to India. Ganesha accompanies the women through a series of exhilarating moments and profound experiences in a climate and culture that is completely foreign to the two travelers.

== Plot ==
Two middle-aged friends from Connecticut, Katherine Brynne and Margaret Civil, travel to India, avoiding their usual, safe vacation spots. Each is, in her own way, seeking to heal from the death of a son. While exploring its cities (with the goal of reaching the Taj Mahal), they encounter the Hindu god, Ganesha. However, Ganesha is not just a single entity, but exists in many people they meet. Katherine is convinced that she needs to kiss a leper, possibly to atone for not supporting her murdered son, Walter. Margaret is hiding the fact that she feels she let her son, Gabriel, be killed, as well as possible breast cancer. They eventually reach the Taj Mahal, whose splendor transforms them. They return to Connecticut to discover Katherine's husband has died, but connected in a deeper, honest friendship.

== Production history ==
A Perfect Ganesh opened Off-Broadway at the Manhattan Theatre Club on June 4, 1993, and closed on September 19, 1993, after 123 performances. Directed by John Tillinger, the cast featured Frances Sternhagen as Margaret, Zoe Caldwell as Katherine, Fisher Stevens as The Man and Dominic Cuskern as Ganesha.

In 2010 the Belgian theater company Judas TheaterProducties premiered a musical version of the play.

== Awards and nominations ==
The play was a finalist for the Pulitzer Prize in 1994.

== Reception ==
A Perfect Ganesh finds comic relief in the fact that Katherine and Margaret are two very American women in a different country.

The Back Stage reviewer noted that McNally "...continues to explore questions of faith and love in a chaotic world... With his newest work, the author moves into deeper waters of spirituality."

Frank Rich, in his review of the original Off-Broadway production for The New York Times, wrote: "The catharsis that brings the long journey of 'A Perfect Ganesh' to an end seems imposed by the author (through his cheerful deus ex machina, Ganesha), not earned, just as many of the incidents leading up to it are schematic. With death everywhere, Mr. McNally cannot be blamed for fighting against helplessness and hopelessness by searching for faith."

Paulanne Simmons, in her CurtainUp review of a 2008 Off-Broadway production by WorkShop Theater Company wrote: "The play has many wonderful moments. The interaction between the two women, at one moment catty the next comforting, both sets them apart and strikes a familiar chord with anyone who has ever participated in or observed female bonding." David Gordon, reviewing for the nytheatre of the 2008 WorkShop Theater Company production wrote: "McNally certainly has a way with words and captures the essence of these women as if he's known them his entire life. Yet, despite the Pulitzer nomination, I don't think Ganesh is the best play in his canon. The play is overwrought and overlong; most of the scenes in the second act end in such a way that you feel they can be a satisfying closer to the play, yet it just keeps going... 'A Perfect Ganesh', is certainly a bit of McNally's response to the AIDS crisis."

The reviewer of a Chicago production at Northlight Theatre in the Josephine Louis Theatre of Northwestern University wrote: "But for all the bright lines and smart talk, when he reaches for profundity, all he can come up with, at best, is sentimentality. The laughter in his plays is strong, but the tears are all too predictable and the emotions are all too weak."
