= George Downing (businessman) =

Property developer, born 1963

- Born: George Maxwell Downing; April 1963 (age 62); Liverpool, England
- Occupation: Property developer

George Maxwell Downing (born April 1963) is a property magnate from Liverpool, England. He is the founder and chairman of Downing, and made his fortune in the property and construction sectors. It is estimated that he has a wealth of around £500 million.

In 2007 he was awarded the DLA Piper Business Person of the Year accolade for his continued investment within Merseyside.

In 2010, Downing was reported by the Liverpool Echo as being "Liverpool's largest commercial landlord", and the owner of the Port of Liverpool building and the Capital Building.

In 2016, Downing was in favour of Brexit.

He is the founder of a company called Downing Property Services Limited. It was founded in 1988 and its development work includes student villages, residential and commercial properties.

== Personal life ==
Downing is married and has three sons. His youngest son, Bay Downing was a student at the University of Tampa, Florida, in 2016.
