= SouthGate =

Shopping centre in Bath, Somerset, England

SouthGate Bath
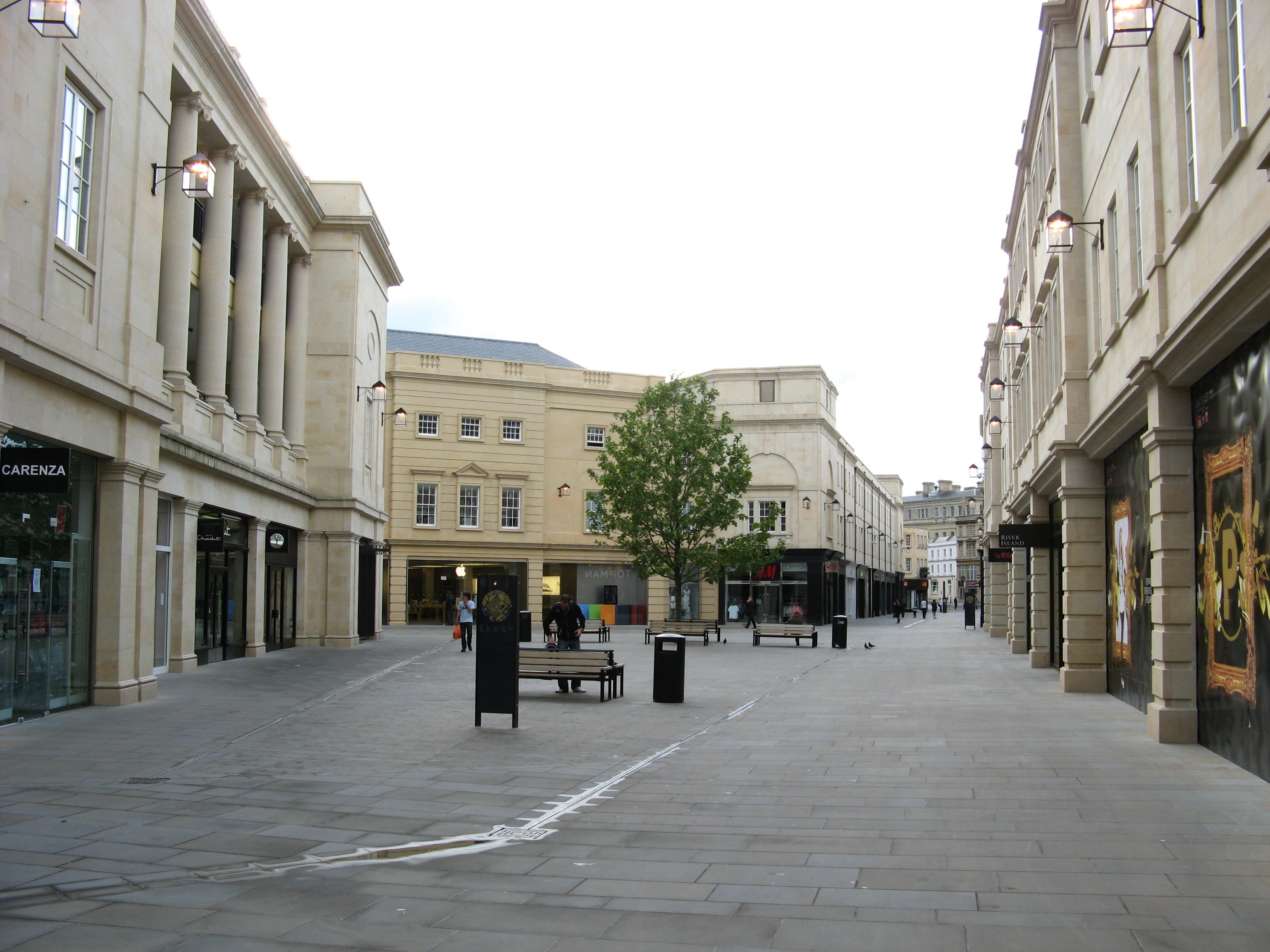
- SouthGate Place, the central plaza
- Location: Bath, Somerset, England
- Coordinates: 51.3786°N 2.3583°W
- Opened: 4 November 2009
- Developer: Multi Development UK
- Manager: Guy Henderson
- Owner: Aviva Investors and British Land
- Architect: Chapman Taylor, Wilkinson Eyre Architects, T+T Design
- Num. of stores: 56
- Parking: 876
- Website: www.southgatebath.com

SouthGate is a shopping centre in Bath, Somerset, England, It is home to over fifty shops, ten restaurants, 99 homes and an 860-space underground car park. It replaced a shopping centre which was demolished in 2007.

The new centre developed by Multi Corporation UK is more than double the size of the previous space and provides 37,000 square metres of retail space, 3,500 m^{2} of leisure space, 2,300 m^{2} of restaurant space plus 99 residential units. It was designed by Chapman Taylor to mimic Georgian architecture with a Bath stone facade. The first owners were the Aviva Investors. In 2013 British Land purchased a 50% stake for £101 million, leaving Aviva Investors as owners of the other 50%.

The development won the Georgian Group Architectural Giles Worsley Award for a New Building in Georgian Context in 2010.

== History ==
=== Site ===
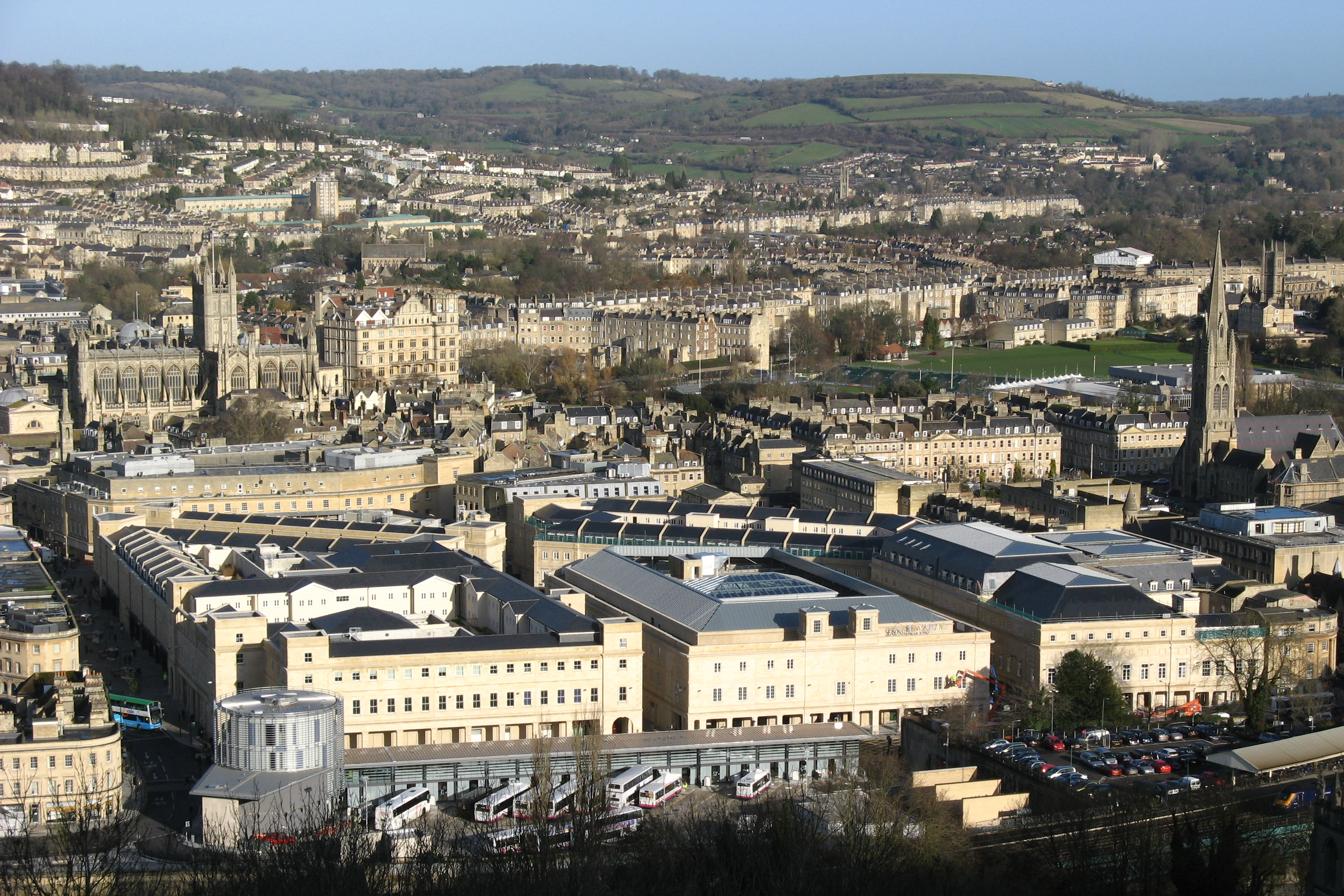
SouthGate shopping centre in the foreground, beyond Bath bus station, with the city of Bath in the background

On the site prior to this development was the Southgate Shopping Centre designed by Owen Luder, architect of the Tricorn Centre in Portsmouth and Trinity Square Carpark in Gateshead; and, on the east half of the site, the former Bath bus station and Ham Gardens Car Park. The Bath bus station and the car park were demolished and a new bus station was opened to the south of the site and just to the west of the main Bath Spa railway station.

The new SouthGate precinct occupies roughly the west half of an area of land once known as The Ham that existed up until around the time of Jane Austen. The Ham was outside the line of the original city wall, which at one time formed The Ham's north border. (The first section of that wall, starting at the city's south gate, ran east roughly along the present-day New Orchard Street.) The Ham is remembered in the name Ham Gardens, a small street towards the north-east corner of the precinct, connecting Philip Street to Kingston Road on the south side of Iceland (supermarket).

After the area for the new precinct had been cleared of the 1960s/1970s buildings, and before construction of the precinct's underground car park was started, an extensive archaeological project was carried out by Museum of London Archaeology Service to expose, study, and preserve underground structures such as sections of the original city wall, the 17th century 'Bum Ditch', a well and cellars from the 18th century, and the 19th century cobbles of the original Marchant's Passage.

=== Construction ===
On 23 September 2008, there was a serious fire on the construction site, caused by gas cylinders. There was a large fireball, with one explosion reaching higher than the surrounding cranes. Surrounding streets were closed while the fire was tackled. Trains did not stop at the station during the fire for safety reasons.

The new precinct opened in three phases. Phase one opened on 4 November 2009, Phase two in May 2010, and the final phase in August 2010.

The residential units were released to market on 16 April 2011. These are on the second floor of St. Lawrence House and the second and third floors of Philip House, Marchant House, and Southgate House.

There are conflicting reports on the cost of the development; Chapman Taylor reports a cost £140 million and the Bath Chronicle a cost of £360 million,

== Layout ==
SouthGate is formed of six buildings: St. Lawrence House, Philip House, the former Debenhams, Block E/F (which originally had an arcade, Little SouthGate, running through it at ground level, that was removed in 2017 and replaced by four new restaurants), Marchant House, and Southgate House. Bridges connecting Block E/F with Marchant House, and Marchant House with Southgate House, provide continuous goods delivery access between these blocks for the commercial units.

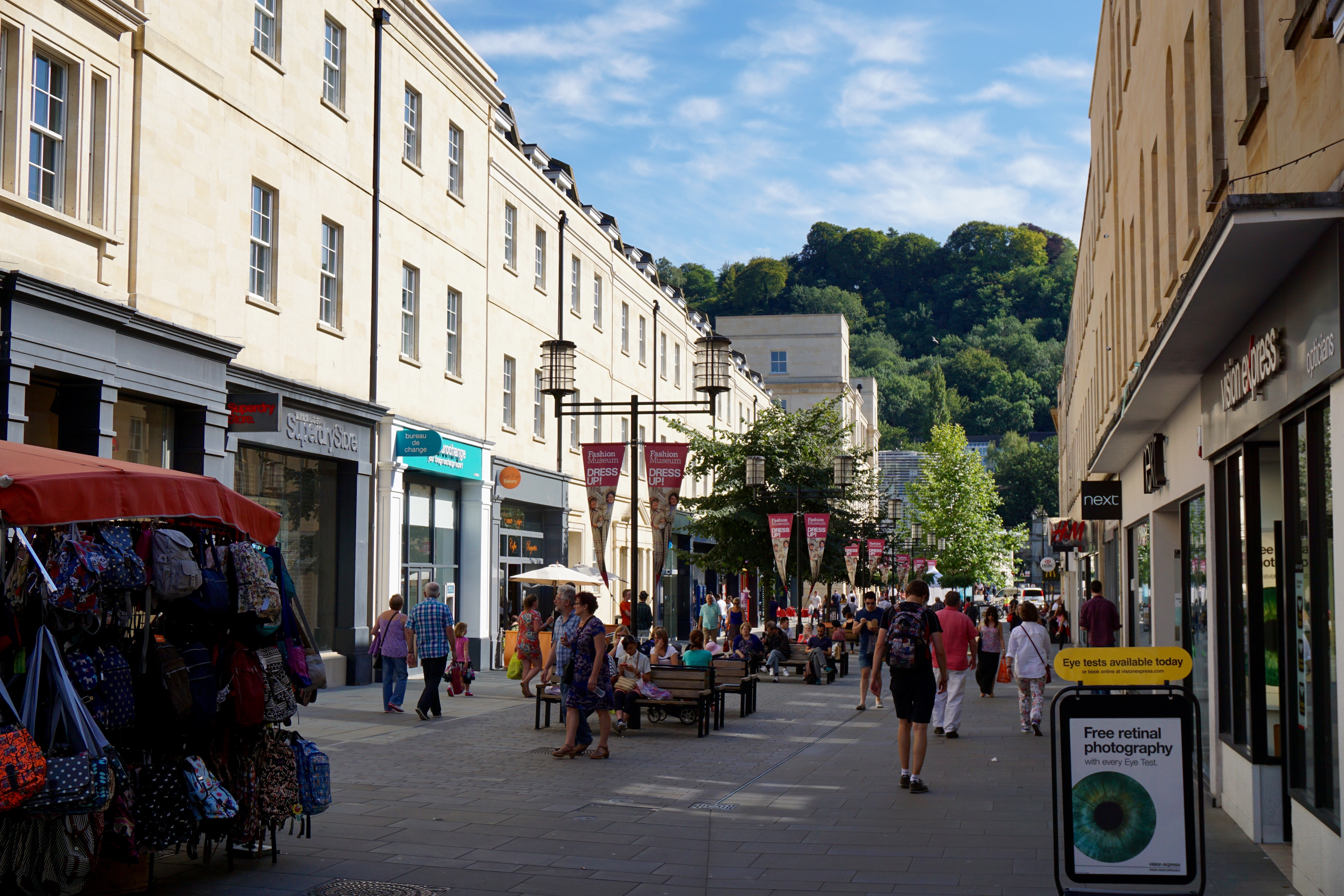
Southgate Street, bordering the area to the west

The area has seven pedestrianised streets and a central plaza (SouthGate Place), and is bordered by New Orchard Street, Manvers Street, Dorchester Street, and Southgate Street. The names of the new pedestrianised streets follow the names of streets that previously occupied similar positions on the site (Philip Street, Newark Street, Railway Street, etc.), although Marchant's Passage has been reborn as New Marchant's Passage. The street sign for New Marchant's Passage is missing the apostrophe.

Block E/F was designed to accommodate restaurants on the first floor and, on the upper floor, a leisure centre, including a swimming pool under the large central glass roof. Both the first and upper floors feature outdoor balconies facing into SouthGate Place through Georgian columns spanning the two levels. The developers were unable to find a tenant to operate the planned leisure centre and the floor has been re-purposed as office space. However, the plans for the first floor were fulfilled with a restaurant, which is now closed (originally Jimmy's World Grill & Bar) taking approximately half the floor (entrance on Dorchester Street) and Cosy Club taking the other half (entrance on SouthGate Place). Cosy Club's space includes the first-floor balcony facing into SouthGate Place.

=== Brunel Square ===
In late 2011, Multi started developments to more closely integrate Bath Spa railway station and Bath bus station with SouthGate, and redevelop some of the railway station car park and northern ramp into a restaurant complex, set amid Brunel's railway arches, at a cost of £12 million. The restaurant complex is named The Vaults Restaurant Quarter.

== Retailers ==
The centre was anchored by Debenhams, until the store closed in 2021. SouthGate has over 50 other shops, including H&M, New Look, Apple Store Urban Outfitters, Fat Face, River Island, Hotel Chocolat and Boots.

Currys was the only shop that has been continuously present for over sixty years: it was in Southgate Street up until the early 1970s, was then in the old Southgate Shopping Centre, and is now in the new SouthGate. Currys closed their Southgate store in 2020 and relocated the store and staff to their bigger store on the Lower Bristol Road.

=== Restaurants ===
Restaurants and food outlets in the main SouthGate centre include Pizza Express, Caffè Nero, Krispy Kreme, Pret a Manger, a branch of Giraffe Restaurants, and Cake Café; and, added in 2017 in the space that was previously Little SouthGate, are Absurd Bird, Tapas Revolution, Thaikun, and Comptoir Libanais. There is also a Sainsbury's Local supermarket.

Restaurants and food outlets in the Brunel Square vaults include Be At One, Gourmet Burger Kitchen, Franco Manca, Graze, Prezzo, and Nando's.

=== Little SouthGate ===
The arcade, Little SouthGate, running through the middle of Block E/F, housed a number of smaller shops, none of which was a sustained success. As a result, planning permission to remove the arcade and replace it with four restaurants was approved in 2016. In 2017 the work was completed and there is no longer a Little SouthGate. The restaurants are Thaikhun, Comptoir Libanais, Absurd Bird, and Tapas Revolution.

== Housing ==
SouthGate hosts four apartment zones (Southgate House, Marchant House, Philip House, and St. Lawrence House), with a total of 99 apartments, that were collectively marketed as The Residence. The apartments have private rooftop gardens.
