= 2 Sisters Food Group =

Subsidiary of Boparan Holdings Ltd

Boparan Holdings Limited
- Type: Private company
- Industry: Food manufacturing
- Founded: 1993
- Founder: Ranjit Singh Boparan
- Headquarters: Colmore Row, Birmingham, England, UK
- Area served: United Kingdom, Ireland, Netherlands and Poland
- Key people: Richard Pennycook, Chairman
- Products: Poultry, biscuits, chilled, frozen and bakery products
- Revenue: £2.69 billion
- Number of employees: 18,000
- Parent: Boparan Holdings
- Website: 2sfg.com

2 Sisters Food Group, a subsidiary of Boparan Holdings Ltd, is a privately owned food manufacturing company with head offices in Birmingham, England, focusing on private label manufacturing for retailer and food service markets. It was established in 1993 by entrepreneur Ranjit Singh Boparan as a poultry cutting operation for frozen retail. He made his two sisters directors, which was the origin of the company name.

As of 2022, the company operates 20 sites in the UK, six in the Netherlands, one in Ireland and one in Poland. It is amongst the largest food companies in the UK by turnover, with annual sales of £3 billion. It employs 18,000 people.

== Acquisitions and disposals ==
In November 2000 the sites at Scunthorpe and Flixton were acquired. These were significant acquisitions as it meant the group would move from a poultry meat cutting operation to a primary producer. In September 2005 the group purchased Haughley Park near Stowmarket, allowing the business to manufacture cooked and breaded poultry.

In June 2007 the group made four acquisitions – including Joseph Mitchell (Letham) of Forfar; Challenger Foods of Sunderland, where 400,000 chicken fillets per week are prepared for sandwich and pizza market; and the Tulip facility in Morecambe. In January 2008 the group bought Devon poultry firm Lloyd Maunder. In April 2010 the group announced the agreed acquisition of Dutch-based chicken processor Storteboom Group, with facilities in the Netherlands and Poland. In January 2011 the group announced it was to buy Northern Foods PLC in a deal worth £342m. In December 2011 Premier Foods sold its Brookes Avana business, combining RF Brookes chilled foods and Avana Bakeries, to 2 Sisters for £30m. In March 2013 the group announced the acquisition of the UK arm of Dutch poultry and red meat company VION.

By August 2014 the business announced it was selling its Avana Bakeries cake business in Newport and its salads business Solway Foods in Corby, Northamptonshire. In January 2018, 2 Sisters reached agreement with Nomad Foods on the sale of its Goodfellas Pizza brand for £200m.

In March 2023 it was announced the Llangefni site situated in Anglesey, North Wales would close, resuling in the loss of around 700 jobs.

== Product issues ==
In August 2014, an undercover investigation into the food poisoning bacteria campylobacter in food in the UK allegedly showed at one factory raw chicken, contaminated by being dropped on the floor, returned to the production line. The company disputed this claim, pointing out the footage did not prove the chicken entered the human food chain. The Food Standards Agency initially cleared the factory but then accepted a breach of regulations had occurred, though the company was not fined. In November 2014, 2 Sisters announced it had launched the most comprehensive programme in the poultry industry to reduce campylobacter levels. The initiative, costing £10m, would encompass the entire supply chain from farm to consumer, using interventions including blast surface chilling and 'no touch' packaging.

In September 2017, an undercover investigation filmed workers allegedly changing the slaughter dates – and hence the sell-by dates – at a 2 Sisters plant in West Bromwich. The company denied the allegations. Within days, management at the plant suspended production. The subsequent Food Standards Agency investigation report, published 2 March 2018, cleared the business of serious non-compliances. The CEO of the FSA, Jason Feeney, said: "Our investigation found some areas for improvement but the issues were resolved promptly by the company, who co-operated fully, and at no point did we find it necessary to take formal enforcement action". Shadow Business Secretary at the time, Jack Dromey, said 2 Sisters were informed that dates on their chicken were being changed as early as 2009.

== Staff and animal welfare ==
In June 2020, during the COVID-19 pandemic, Public Health Wales confirmed 75 cases at the 2 Sisters chicken factory in Llangefni on Anglesey. All staff had to self-isolate.

In August 2022, industry whistle-blowers claimed that factory farm chickens had "died slowly of heat exhaustion" after inadequate ventilation and cooling during the 2022 United Kingdom heat wave. 2 Sisters Food Group was listed as one of the companies involved. The Department for Environment, Food and Rural Affairs said it was "deeply concerned" about the issue and that the sheer scale of the mortalities had prompted an investigation by officials.

== Management ==
In February 2018, Ranjit Singh Boparan announced he was stepping up into the role of President of parent company Boparan Holdings Limited and in May 2018, Ronald Kers was appointed CEO of 2 Sisters Food Group. In February 2023, it was announced that Kers would be stepping down from the CEO role in the summer.

== Sustainability ==
In December 2014, the business signed a major contract with Liverpool-based H2 Energy for the installation of bio-refineries at ten 2 Sisters factories to convert product waste into energy. The company claims the deal – which will eventually encompass all its manufacturing sites in the UK – will deliver 35,000 tonnes of carbon savings, 20,000 fewer lorry journeys a year and a significant electric and thermal energy boost, reducing its non-transport carbon footprint by 10%.
