= Boparan =

Boparan may refer to:

- Boparan Holdings, holding company owned by Ranjit Singh Boparan
- Ranjit Singh Boparan (born 1966), British businessman
