= Boparan Restaurant Group =

British company

Boparan Holdings Limited
- Industry: Food, catering services
- Headquarters: United Kingdom
- Owner: Ranjit Singh Boparan and Baljinder Kaur Boparan
- Website: boparanrestaurantgroup.co.uk

Boparan Restaurant Group is a British operator of restaurant businesses and food production facilities, based in Birmingham. It is owned by Ranjit Singh Boparan and his wife, Baljinder Kaur Boparan.

The company owns restaurant chains such as Giraffe World Kitchen, Ed's Easy Diner, Gourmet Burger Kitchen and has franchise agreements with Carl's Jr. and Slim Chickens.

== History ==
In January 2009, the group rescued four FishWorks restaurants from administration. In January 2010, the group acquired Harry Ramsden's from SSP Group for an undisclosed sum.

In January 2016, Boparan acquired the Cinnamon Collection chain of three Indian restaurants in London. In June 2016, Boparan purchased Giraffe Restaurants from Tesco for an undisclosed sum. In September 2016, the group acquired turkey producer, Bernard Matthews, for £87.5 million. In October 2016, the group purchased Ed's Easy Diner.

In January 2018, the group announced it would begin a franchise agreement with American chain, Slim Chickens, bringing the chain to the United Kingdom. In August 2019, all 34 Harry Ramsden's were sold to Deep Blue Restaurants. In March 2020, Boparan acquired the Italian restaurant chain Carluccio's for £3.4 million. In October 2020, Boparan purchased Gourmet Burger Kitchen from Famous Brands.

In May 2024, the group announced it would begin a master license agreement with American chain, Carl's Jr., bringing the chain to the United Kingdom.
