= Ed's Easy Diner =

British restaurant chain

Giraffe Concepts Ltd (trading as Ed’s Easy Diner)
- Type: Subsidiary
- Industry: Casual dining
- Founded: 1987; 39 years ago in London, England
- Founder: Barry Margolis
- Headquarters: Birmingham, England, UK
- Number of locations: 3 (2026)
- Area served: United Kingdom
- Parent: Boparan Holdings
- Website: https://edseasydiner.com/

Ed's Easy Diner is a casual restaurant chain based in the United Kingdom selling 1950s American diner style items.

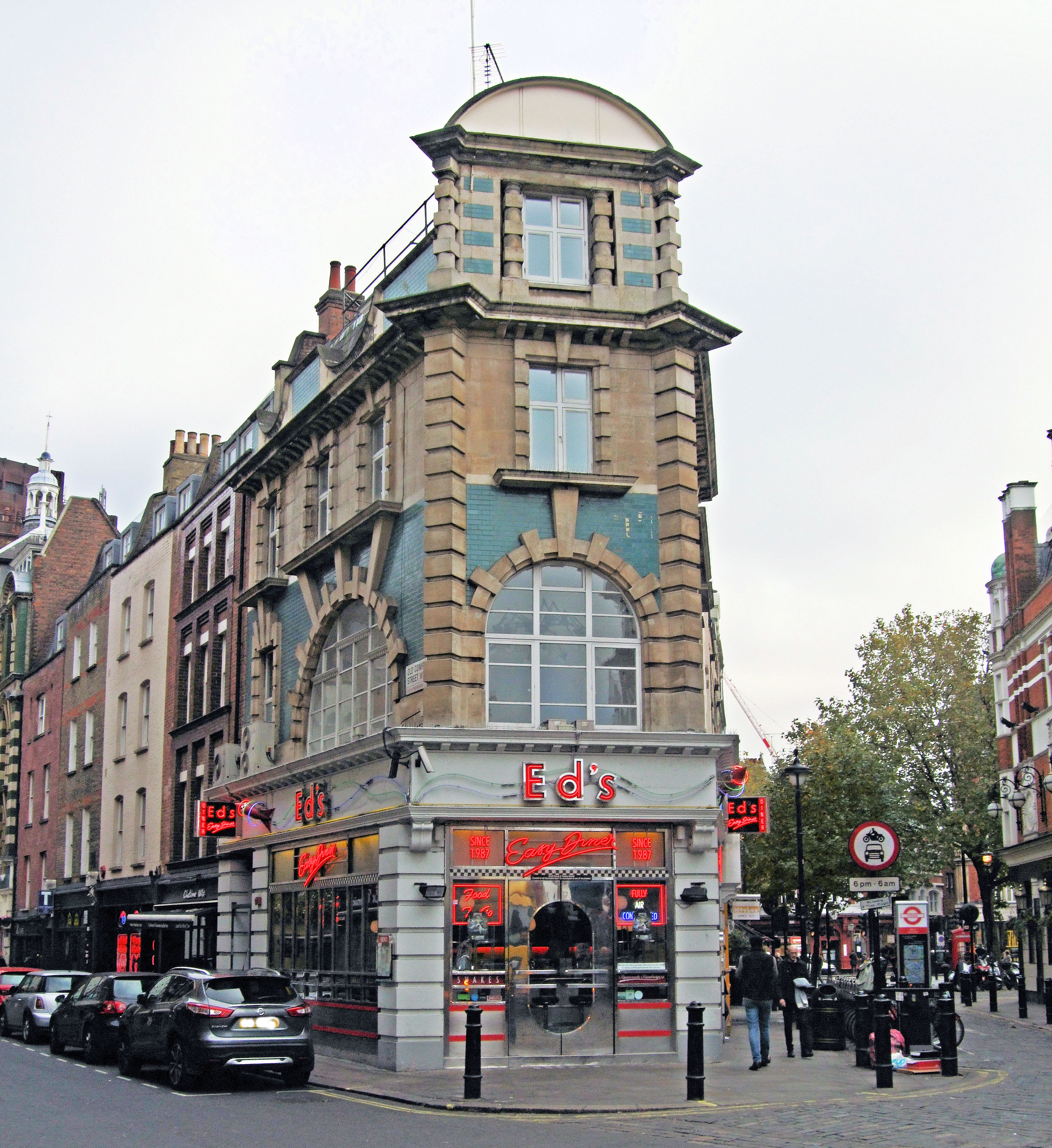
Ed's Easy Diner, Soho

== History ==
The first Ed's Easy Diner was opened by Barry Margolis in London's Soho in 1987. This outlet permanently closed in January 2019 and was subsequently converted into a Slim Chickens. In 2008, just three diners remained, all situated in London. As of April 2014, Ed's Easy Diner had 24 outlets; by September 2016, they had 59. In October 2016, the struggling company experienced poor sales and over-expansion and was purchased by Boparan Restaurant Holdings after it collapsed into administration. It is now a trading division of Boparan's Giraffe Restaurants.

After that deal closed, 26 diners closed immediately, and almost 400 jobs were lost; 33 diners remained open, supporting 700 jobs. As of January 2019, the company held 24 diners within the United Kingdom; further, their first branch in Soho closed permanently. Six more Ed's Diner locations were set to close in March 2019, due to reduced sales in the casual dining market. The company had 11 UK diners in August 2021; it had no restaurants in London.

In September 2021, it began a licensing deal of its branding and some of its recipes for a frozen food line sold by supermarket Iceland.

As of November 2026, there are three Ed's Easy Diner locations in Selfridges Birmingham, Cheshire Oaks Designer Outlet and Southampton's Westquay.

== See also ==
- Eddie Rockets
- Johnny Rockets
- List of hamburger restaurants
