= Steers (restaurant) =

South African restaurant chain

- Type: Franchise
- Industry: Restaurant
- Genre: Take-aways and diners
- Founded: 1960s
- Founder: George Halamandres
- Headquarters: Midrand, South Africa
- Number of locations: 714
- Area served: Africa; United Arab Emirates
- Products: Burgers; Chicken; Chips; Drinks; Milkshakes; Ribs; Salads
- Parent: Famous Brands Ltd
- Website: Steers.co.za

Steers is a South African quick-service restaurant brand, serving burgers and chips. Other menu items include chicken burgers, ribs, ice cream, milkshakes, chicken and salads.

== History ==
Steers founder, George Halamandress, created the original Milky Lane ice cream parlours; this was followed in quick succession by the first South African steakhouse (the Rosebank Golden Spur), the Seven Steers steakhouse in Highlands North and the Black Steer in Yeoville in the early 1960s.

After George died in 1984, leadership of the chain passed to his nephews Peter, Theo, and their brother, Perry, as well as to George's youngest son, John. The three brothers had all been operating their own franchises and John was operating the manufacturing business, supplying Steers outlets and other retailers. Together, they re-engineered the brand and actively sought new franchisees. The early 1980s saw the opening of Steers in Sandton City, which attracted interest from would-be franchisees, and this encouraged the team behind Steers to launch their franchise programme.

By the end of the 1990s, Steers started expanding its business beyond South Africa, and outlets opened in Swaziland (now Eswatini), Botswana, Zimbabwe, Kenya, Mauritius, Zambia, Tanzania and Ivory Coast. In early 90s they also opened one restaurant in Europe, in Athens, Greece that only lasted for a few years. The name Steers evolved over the years too, starting with Golden Spur, then changing to Seven Steer, followed by Branded Steer and Longhorn Steer, before becoming Steers.

Steers Holdings listed on the Johannesburg Stock Exchange in November 1994, and in 2001 changed its name to Famous Brands Limited. This reflected the diversity of the Famous Brands group portfolio, although Steers remained the icon brand within the group.

The brand has continued to prosper and currently has over 600 Steers restaurants worldwide. By attracting new consumers as well as increasing the consumption frequency of existing customers, Steers succeeded in reaching their target of double-digit system-wide sales growth in 2012.

In the late 80s the Comitis family, who owned the Steers rights in the Western Cape, continued to grow the brand throughout Southern Africa. After decades of growth Steers became the most prominent fast food company in Southern Africa and the Comitis family sold the share equity and manufacturing rights and franchise rights back to the Famous Brands parent company.

== Background ==
=== Franchise ===
In 1983, Steers launched a new franchise programme. The owners placed a single advertisement in a local newspaper inviting franchisees to apply, and since then Steers has never had a shortage of prospective franchisees seeking to buy into the franchise. Within two years there were more than 15 outlets opened, and this number grew to 250 stores ten years later. By the end of the 1990s, Steers began expanding beyond South Africa's borders, with outlets in Eswatini, Botswana, Namibia, Zimbabwe, Kenya, Mauritius, Zambia, Tanzania and Ivory Coast. There are over 500 franchises across Africa. A Steers restaurant opened on Lavender Hill, Battersea, London, UK in late July 2013. Although as of 2022, this has now been closed. In December 2025, Steers expanded into Southeast Asia with the opening of its first Malaysian outlet at the PETRONAS Station in Seksyen 9, Bandar Baru Bangi.

=== Achievements ===
For 17 years in a row, Steers has been recognized by well-known Johannesburg listing magazine, Leisure Options, for serving the Best Hamburger in the QSR industry. Steers has also won ‘best chips’ for 13 years running.

Steers Holdings Limited was, later renamed Famous Brands Limited.

=== Slogans ===
- Flame-Grilled, It Just Tastes Better (current)
- Real Burgers
- Real Food Made Real Good

== Countries with Steers restaurants ==
Countries with Steers Restaurants

- Botswana
- Eswatini
- Ivory Coast
- Kenya
- Lesotho
- Malawi
- Malaysia
- Mauritius
- Mozambique
- Namibia
- Nigeria
- Oman
- South Africa
- Sudan
- Tanzania
- United Arab Emirates
- Zambia
- Zimbabwe
