= Lloyd Maunder =

Lloyd Maunder are an Exeter, Devon based group of West Country retail butchers, a major producer of locally reared beef, pork and chicken products.

== History ==
FJP Maunder established a meat processing facility at Witheridge, Devon in 1879. He opened a butcher's shop in 1886, and was also chairman of a dairy company from 1894. He passed over management of his business to his son Lloyd Maunder in 1898, who then expanded the business by selling meat and dairy products to customers in London, thus becoming one of the first major suppliers of the supermarket chain Sainsbury's. As the business's dependence on rail transport increased, the company moved its headquarters and main meat processing operations in 1913 to the current site in Willand, near Exeter, to allow easier access to the Great Western Railway. This was also the first year when the first Lloyd Maunder branded shop opened in Bampton Street, Tiverton.

In the interwar period, the company expanded quickly in both its meat processing capacity, and its retail division. The company expanded into the production of lamb, beef and sausages. Like many butchers it suffered during World War II with rationing of meat (at the start of the war most was imported), but as it was based where many of the farm producers were located, managed to survive in good shape through its long-term relationships.

== Present ==
Lloyd Maunder began processing chicken in 1958, which by the 2000s at the Willand plant had become the dominant part of the company's output and turnover. In January 2008, the company sold the division to 2 Sisters Food Group.

In 2005, the company had bought Dewhurst Butchers Ltd an MBO based in Tunbridge Wells Kent who had purchased it from the receivers of the Vestey Group in 1995. They went into administration in 2007, Also in 2008 former Lloyd Maunder director Andrew Maunder set up a new limited company (West Country Family Butchers Ltd) and purchased the 14 Lloyd Maunder branded butchers shops, which still trade under the Lloyd Maunder name. This company has since added its own sausage making facility on the outskirts of Exeter.

By the middle of 2025 it turned out, that Lloyd Maunder produces Halal meat to distribute it in Supermarket chains.
