= Famous Brands =

South African restaurant franchisor

Famous Brands Limited
- Formerly: Steers Group
- Type: Public
- Traded as: JSE: FBR
- ISIN: ZAE000053328
- Industry: Fast casual restaurants Food manufacturing Logistics; Retail
- Founded: 1960; 66 years ago
- Founder: George Halamandres
- Headquarters: Midrand, Gauteng, South Africa
- Number of locations: 2,979 (2025)
- Area served: South Africa; United Kingdom; Middle East; Africa
- Key people: Darren Hele (CEO); Christopher Boulle (Chairman)
- Revenue: ▲ R8.28 billion (2025)
- Operating income: ▲ R914 million (2025)
- Net income: ▲ R585 million (2025)
- Total assets: ▲ R3.64 billion (2025)
- Total equity: ▲ R1.29 billion (2025)
- Website: famousbrands.co.za

Famous Brands (formerly known as Steers Group) is a South African fast casual restaurant conglomerate, operating via numerous brands using a franchise model. Aside from operating restaurants, the company is also involved in food and beverage manufacturing, logistics, and retail, in relation to its outlets.

Founded in 1960 and headquartered in Midrand, Gauteng, Famous Brands is traded on the JSE.

As of mid-2026, Famous Brands has around 3,000 restaurants across around 20 brands, and operates in 30 countries. This makes it Africa's largest restaurant franchisor.

== History ==
Founded by George Halamandress in 1960, Famous Brands was originally known as Steers. Halamandress had previously created the original Milky Lane ice cream parlours, followed in quick succession by the first South African steakhouse.

In 1999, Steers Group acquired Debonairs Pizza.

In August 2003, Famous Brands acquired Pleasure Foods, which included the South African master franchise license for Wimpy for R150.6 million.

In February 2007, Famous Brands acquired a majority stake in Wimpy.

In July 2009, Famous Brands acquired Mugg & Bean.

In September 2016, Famous Brands acquired Gourmet Burger Kitchen in the United Kingdom from Capricorn Ventures for £120 million. In October 2020, Gourmet Burger Kitchen was sold to Boparan Restaurant Group for an undisclosed sum.

== Operations ==
Famous Brands' operations comprise 4 pillars - restaurants, manufacturing, logistics, and retail. As of 2025, the group operated 9 logistics sites, 11 manufacturing facilities, and sold a total of 188 products.

As per the group's February 2025 financial statements, it had 2,979 restaurants in 30 countries. Of these, 2,626 were located in South Africa. A further 224 were located throughout the SADC, 68 across the rest of Africa and the Middle East, and 61 in the United Kingdom.

As of mid-2025, Famous Brands owned and operated the following restaurant chains in its mainstream category:

- Debonairs Pizza (868 locations)
- Steers (735 locations)
- Wimpy (539 locations)
- Mugg & Bean (322 locations)
- Fishaways (242 locations)
- Milky Lane (132 locations)
- Signature Brands (122 locations)
- Mr Bigg's (13 locations)
- Other (6 locations)

The group operates numerous small, upmarket chains under its Signature Brands portfolio, including Lupa, Mythos, Paul, Salsa Mexican Grill, Turn ‘n Tender, Vovo Telo, and House of Coffees.

Famous Brands is a Level 1 BBBEE contributor.
