= Eddie Rocket's =

Irish restaurant chain

Rocket Restaurants Ltd.
- Type: Limited liability
- Industry: Restaurant
- Founded: 1989; 37 years ago
- Founders: Niall Fortune
- Headquarters: Dublin, Ireland
- Area served: Republic of Ireland, Northern Ireland and Germany
- Products: American diner-style food
- Website: http://www.eddierockets.ie

Eddie Rocket's is an Irish restaurant chain, with its headquarters in Dublin. It offers American-style food in 1950s-style diners (similar to the Johnny Rockets diner restaurants in the United States). It is owned by Rocket Restaurants Limited.

== Company ==
Rocket Restaurants Limited opened their first restaurant in Dublin in 1989. At one point, the company was present in 42 locations in Ireland (both in the Republic of Ireland and Northern Ireland), England, Wales, and Spain. The company still has a substantial franchisee base. The Spanish, English and Welsh sites have since closed. They also have a number of restaurants branded Rocket's by Eddie Rocket's; these restaurants are smaller fast casual restaurants that feature self service instead of table service, which is the norm in Eddie Rockets locations and have a more modern décor similar to that found in chains such as Five Guys and Shake Shack.

== Franchise ==
Eddie Rocket's restaurants are largely franchised, with 32 of the 40 restaurants held by franchisees. They are a member of the Irish Franchise Association.

== Locations ==
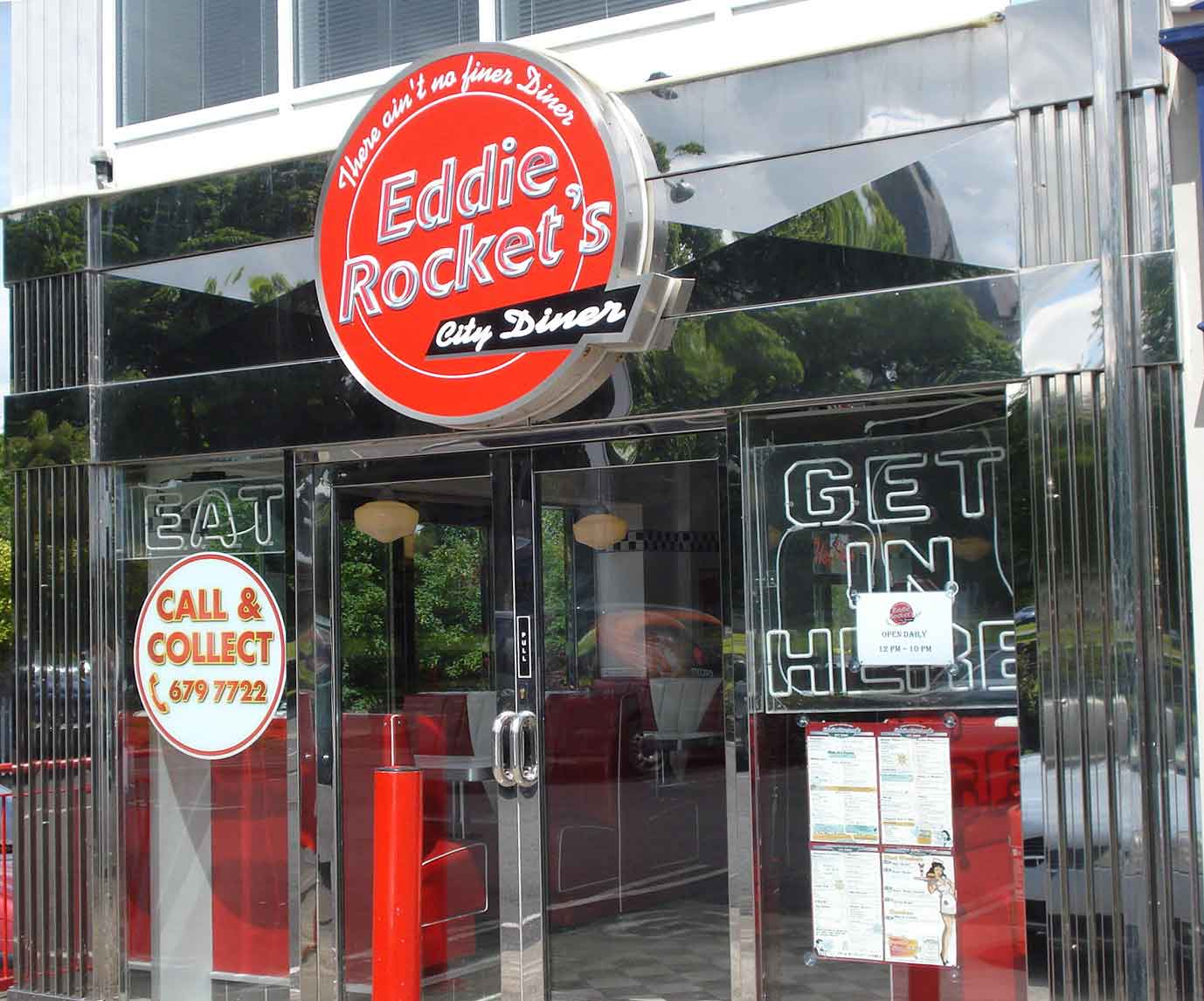
The restaurant of Eddie Rocket's in Ennis, County Clare

The 38 restaurants currently in operation in Ireland include:

- Arklow
- Athlone
- Carlow
- Dublin
- Drogheda
- Killarney
- Mullingar
- Naas
- Navan
- Newbridge
- Newry
- Portlaoise
- Tullamore

== Shake Dog / Rockin' Joe's ==
A number of Eddie Rocket's restaurants in Cork, Galway, Limerick, Waterford, Wexford, and Clonmel were dissociated from the company. These locations were rebranded as Rockin' Joe's in 2013 following a dispute between Eddie Rocket's and its largest franchisee, Limerick businessman Brian Dunne. Rockin' Joe's later rebranded as Shake Dog.

== See also ==
- Ed's Easy Diner
- Johnny Rockets
- List of hamburger restaurants
