= Carluccio's =

British Italian restaurant chain

Carluccio's Ltd
- Company type: Italian Restaurant
- Industry: Hospitality
- Founded: 1999; 27 years ago in London, England
- Founder: Antonio Carluccio
- Headquarters: London, England, UK
- Area served: UK, Ireland, Middle East and US
- Key people: Mark Jones, CEO
- Services: Restaurant and food shop
- Owner: Boparan Restaurant Group
- Website: www.carluccios.com

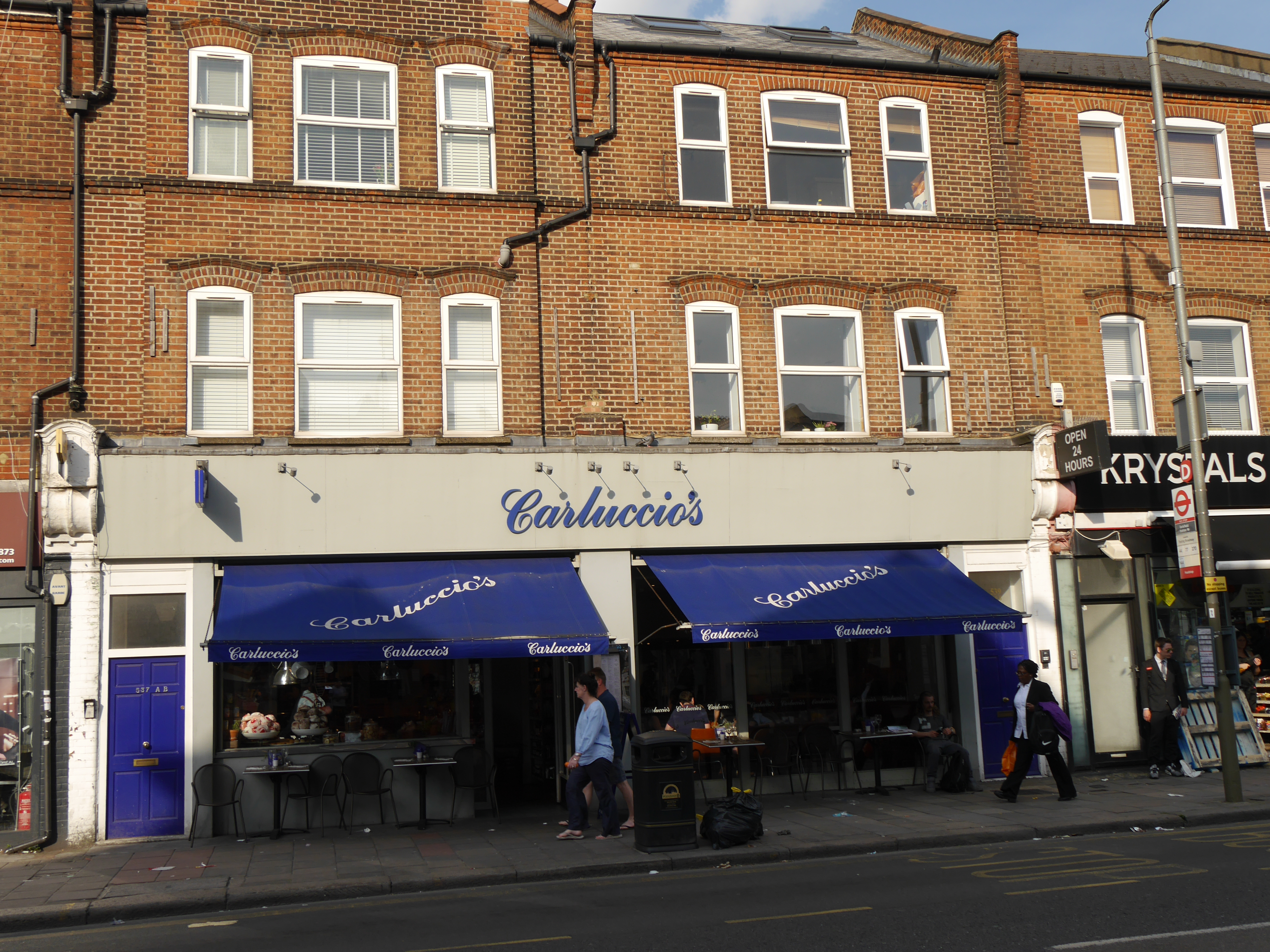
Carluccio's, Garratt Lane, Earlsfield, London

Carluccio's is an Italian restaurant chain founded in London in 1999.

== History ==
In 1991, Antonio Carluccio and his then wife opened an Italian food shop named Carluccio's.

In 1999, the first "Carluccio's Caffè" was opened in Market Place, London. The chain expanded, initially across southeast England, and subsequently across the UK. In 2005, Carluccio's listed on the Alternative Investment Market as a PLC. In 2010 the company received a takeover offer from the Landmark Group, a Dubai-based enterprise, valuing Carluccio's at £90m. The transaction was approved by the shareholders and completed in October 2010.

In March 2018, Carluccio's brought in KPMG for financial advice for possible options due to high costs and increased competition within the industry.

On 20 March 2020 following guidance from the UK Government for handling the COVID-19 pandemic Carluccio's, along with all other bars and restaurants in the country, closed their shops temporarily. Ten days later, on 30 March, Carluccio's went into administration putting 2,000 jobs at risk. The administrator looked at options for the future of the company including mothballing the business using government support and trying to sell all or parts of it. On 22 May, it was announced that the Boparan Restaurant Group was acquiring the Carluccio's brand and taking over 30 of the 71 outlets, with the remainder closed.

In June 2021 Boparan announced plans to open 500 new restaurants over five years under the brand Caffè Carluccio's.
