= Witheridge =

Village in Devon, England

Coordinates: 50°55′01″N 3°42′03″W

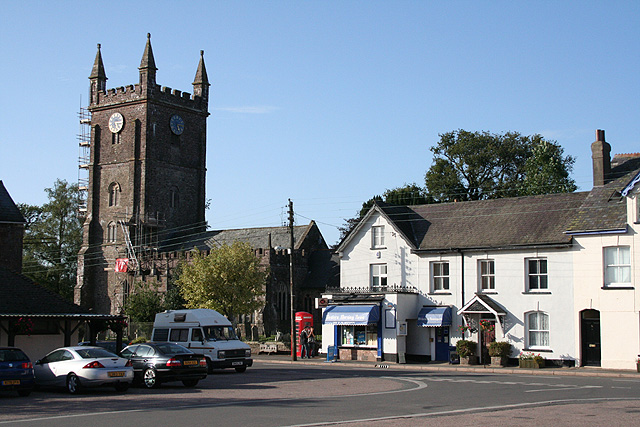
Witheridge with St John’s Church

Witheridge is a village and civil parish in the North Devon district of Devon, England. In 2011 the population of the parish was 1,158, increasing slightly to 1,306 at the 2021 Census. An electoral ward with the same name exists. The population at the above census was 2,465. Its name may be derived from the Old English for "Weather Ridge", which would fit with the village's somewhat exposed situation.

Situated almost equidistant from Dartmoor and Exmoor, the village has earned the nickname the Gateway to the Two Moors Way. Butcher FJP Maunder established his business in the village in 1879, which taken over by his son became local butchers chain Lloyd Maunder. The village is home to two shops, a pub, restaurant and a cafe. There is also the home to Mid Devon Medical Practice.

The parish church of St John the Baptist is a Gothic-style church, built circa 1500, and restored in 1841 and 1884. Its carved stone pulpit is one of just 70 medieval similar pulpits in England.

The village is twinned with Cambremer in Normandy, France, and the two villages have annual exchange trips (although not solely for students).

== Sport and leisure ==
Witheridge has a Non-League football club Witheridge F.C. who play in the South West Peninsula League which is at step 6 of the National League System as well as a Reserve side who play in Division 1 of the Devon and Exeter Football League. Both sides play their home games at Edge Down Park. The St John's Fair takes place annually and shows the wonderful community spirit in this English village.

Witheridge also has a well established Taekwondo club.

Following a single resident complaint, in 2024 Witheridge Parish Council paid £2,000 for adjustment to the mechanism of the clock installed at the parish church, so that it rang hourly only between 07:00 to 23:00.

== Notable residents ==
Witheridge is the birthplace of Mary Baker, a noted impostor who in 1817 went by the name "Princess Caraboo" from a fictional far-off island kingdom.

Frank and Mary Housam have represented Witheridge in town crier competitions all over the world, winning trophies in Canada, Australia and the US, and represented Witheridge at the World Town Crier Championships in Maryborough City, Australia.
