= Debonairs Pizza =

South African pizza restaurant chain

Debonair's Pizza

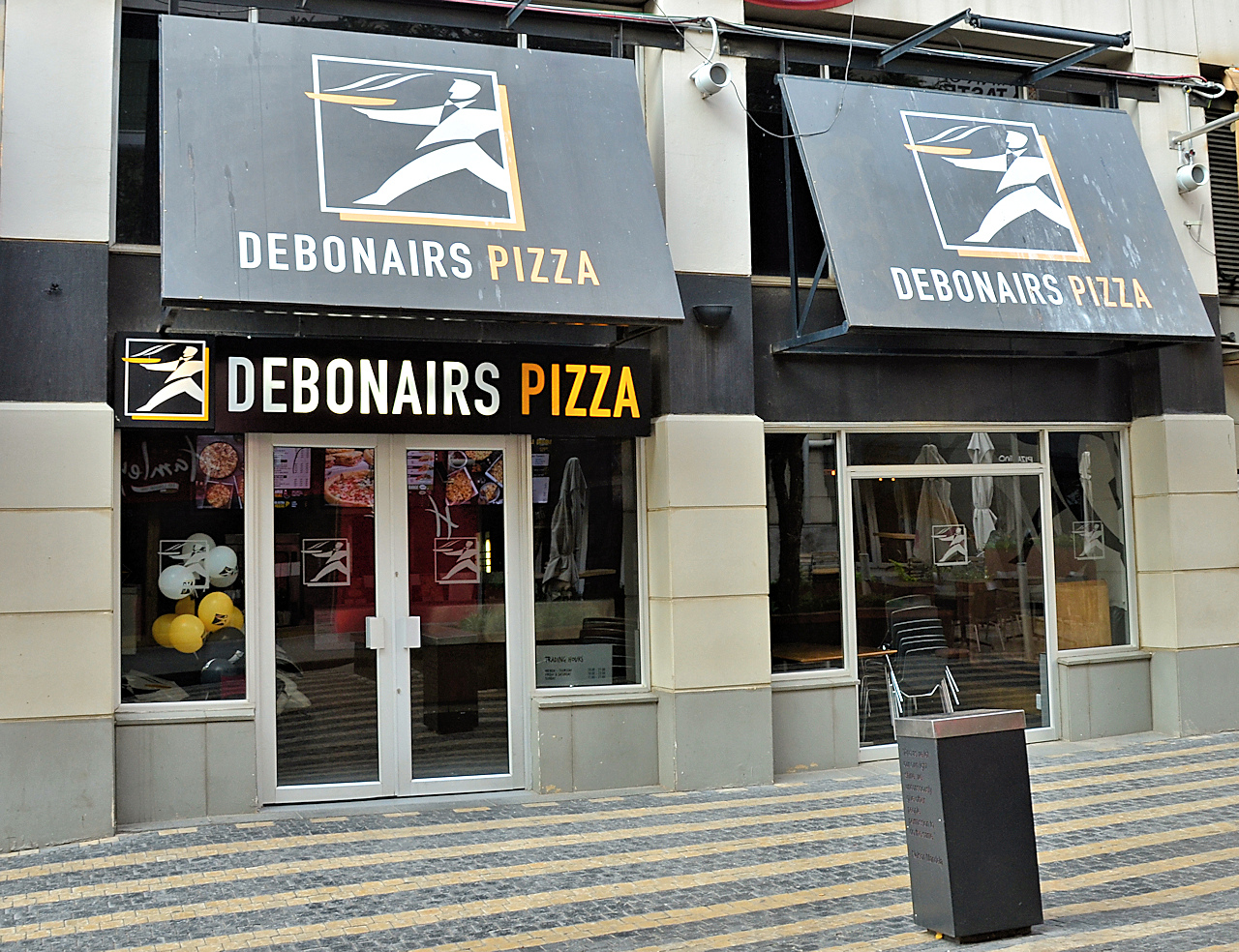
- Rosebank, South Africa location
- Industry: Food delivery; Franchising; Restaurants
- Founded: 1991; 35 years ago in Pietermaritzburg, KwaZulu-Natal
- Founders: Craig MacKenzie; Andrew Harvey
- Headquarters: Midrand, Johannesburg, South Africa
- Number of locations: 868(2025)
- Area served: Africa; United Arab Emirates
- Products: Pizza; Pasta; Chicken wings Submarine sandwiches Dessert
- Parent: Famous Brands
- Website: www.debonairspizza.co.za

Debonairs Pizza (often referred to as Debonairs) is a South African pizza restaurant franchise, headquartered in Johannesburg. The chain operates 868 outlets across Africa and the United Arab Emirates.

== History ==
Debonairs was founded in 1991, in the Park Road Spar in Pietermaritzburg. The company was founded by two university students, Craig MacKenzie and Andrew Harvey, who had just R6,000 (~ $2170) between them. MacKenzie came up with the idea and business model to found the company following a gap year trip to Los Angeles, while studying at the University of KwaZulu-Natal.

From conception, the restaurant offered free delivery services, and delivery people would wear tuxedos with bowties, as a differentiator.

Subsequent restaurants established were located in Umhlanga and Durban.

In 1996, Steers Group (now Famous Brands) acquired Debonairs, and in 1997, the company opened its first restaurant outside South Africa, in Manzini, Eswatini.

Debonairs began delivering food by vehicle in 1997.

The following year, the chain opened its 60th restaurant (located in Rivonia), and received the SA Franchisor of the Year award from the Franchisee Association of South Africa.

In 1999, Debonairs aired its first TV commercial.

The chain's tagline was changed in 2005 from "We Deliver Smartly" to "It's the way you like it". This was changed to the current tagline, "Try Something Different", in 2011.

In 2010, the restaurant chain became the first pizza brand in Africa to offer mobile ordering.

After 25 years of operation, Debonairs opened its 600th restaurant in 2016, in Botshabelo. In 2020, the chain opened its 700th restaurant.

In February 2025, it was reported that Debonairs had opened 27 new restaurants over its preceding fiscal year—a rate of roughly 1 outlet every 2 weeks.

== Operations ==
As of 2018, Debonairs Pizza was the largest pizza restaurant chain in South Africa. In June 2025, it was the largest chain in parent company Famous Brands' portfolio.

As of mid-2025, the company had 868 restaurants across 16 countries, most of which are in Africa. The company also had locations in the United Arab Emirates. The majority of its restaurants are located in South Africa.

== Corporate social responsibility ==
In 2012, Debonairs started its CSR initiative, called Doughnation, working with local charities and communities in need in South Africa.

In 2018, Debonairs ran a South African TV advertisement campaign on national (free-to-air) and DSTV channels, in support of the LGBT community. The ad featured a female same-sex couple, and the tagline, "Celebrate Different". Debonairs Marketing Executive Toni Joubert instructed FCB Johannesburg to create a campaign that acknowledged the diversity of South African society and culture, where the message encouraged the audience to be tolerant of and celebrate South Africans' differences. The campaign received positive and encouraging responses from the public.

== Accolades ==
In 2016, Debonairs Pizza was voted South Africa's favorite pizza brand, and 3rd favorite fast food brand, in the Sunday Times Top Brands Awards. In the same year, the South African Customer Satisfaction Index (SAcsi) for Fast Food Restaurants found that Debonairs Pizza had the most satisfied customers in the fast food industry, taking 1st place for quality and value for money.

In 2019, the chain won the Top Brands Award again, and moved up to second place for favorite fast food brand.

== See also ==
- List of pizza chains
- List of pizza franchises
- List of pizza varieties by country
