= Wetherby Whaler =

The Wetherby Whaler

Restaurant information
- Established: 1989
- Food type: Fish and chips
- Location: Yorkshire, England
- Website: Wetherby Whaler

The Wetherby Whaler is a chain of fish and chips restaurants in the United Kingdom. The first restaurant was founded in 1989 in Wetherby with six more having been subsequently opened across Yorkshire in Guiseley, Wakefield, York, Pudsey, Empire Outwood and Tadcaster (takeway only).

== History ==
Phillip and Janine Murphy founded the Wetherby Whaler restaurant in 1989 having worked in fishery in Tadcaster since 1969.

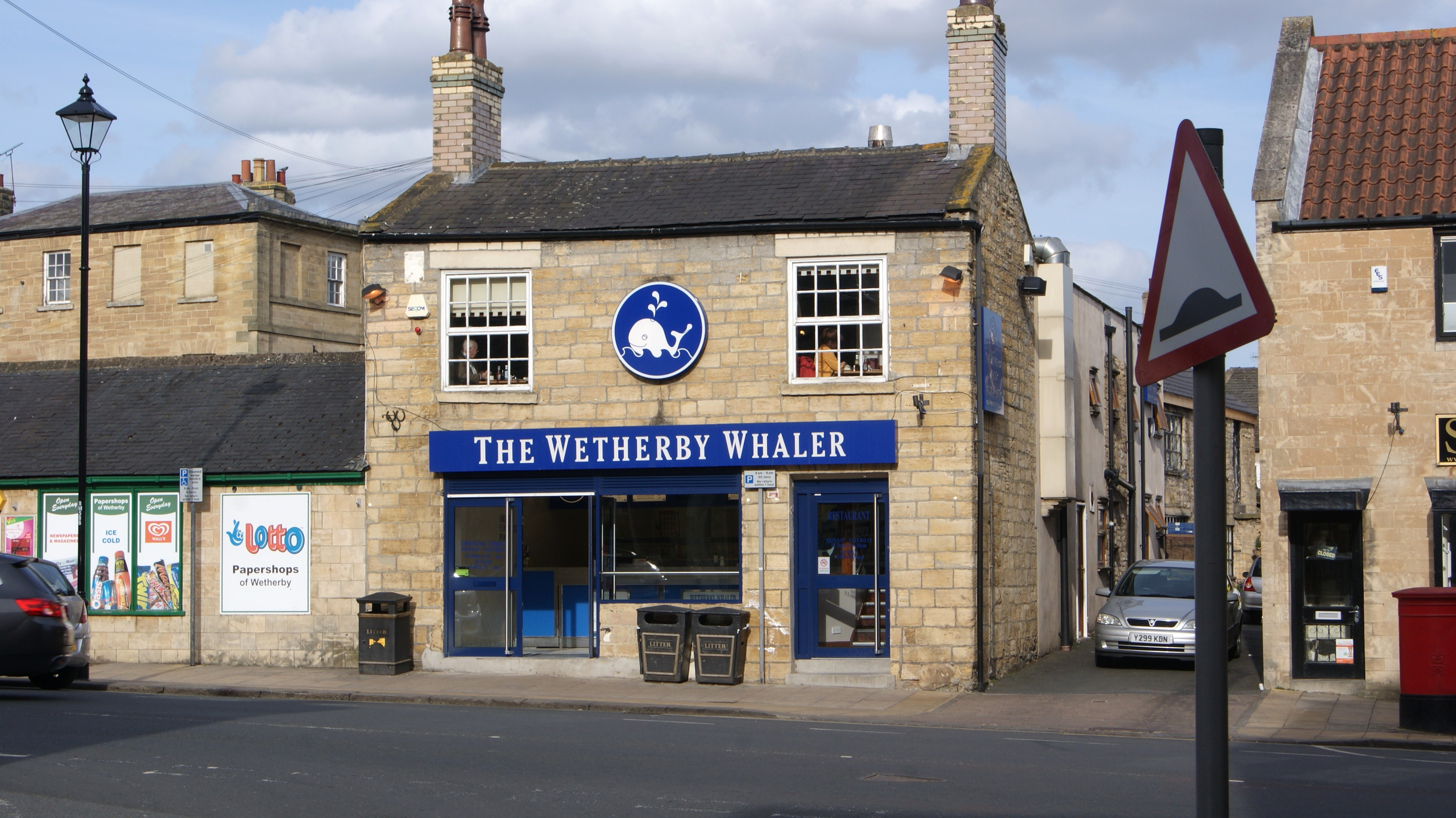
The original branch on Market Place, Wetherby seen in 2013.

The second restaurant in the chain was opened in 1990 in Pudsey. More branches were opened thereafter; York in 1996 (which was expanded in 2014), Wakefield in 2001 and Guiseley in 2012.

Guiseley fish and chip shop Harry Ramsden's was acquired by the Wetherby Whaler in 2012 for £500,000. Considered by reviewers in The Metro and The Guardian to be the "spiritual home" of fish and chips, Harry Ramsden's had gone into administration six months before the sale due to financial issues.

A charity musical performance with a storyline based on fish and chips was held at the Guiseley restaurant in 2016.

== Reception ==
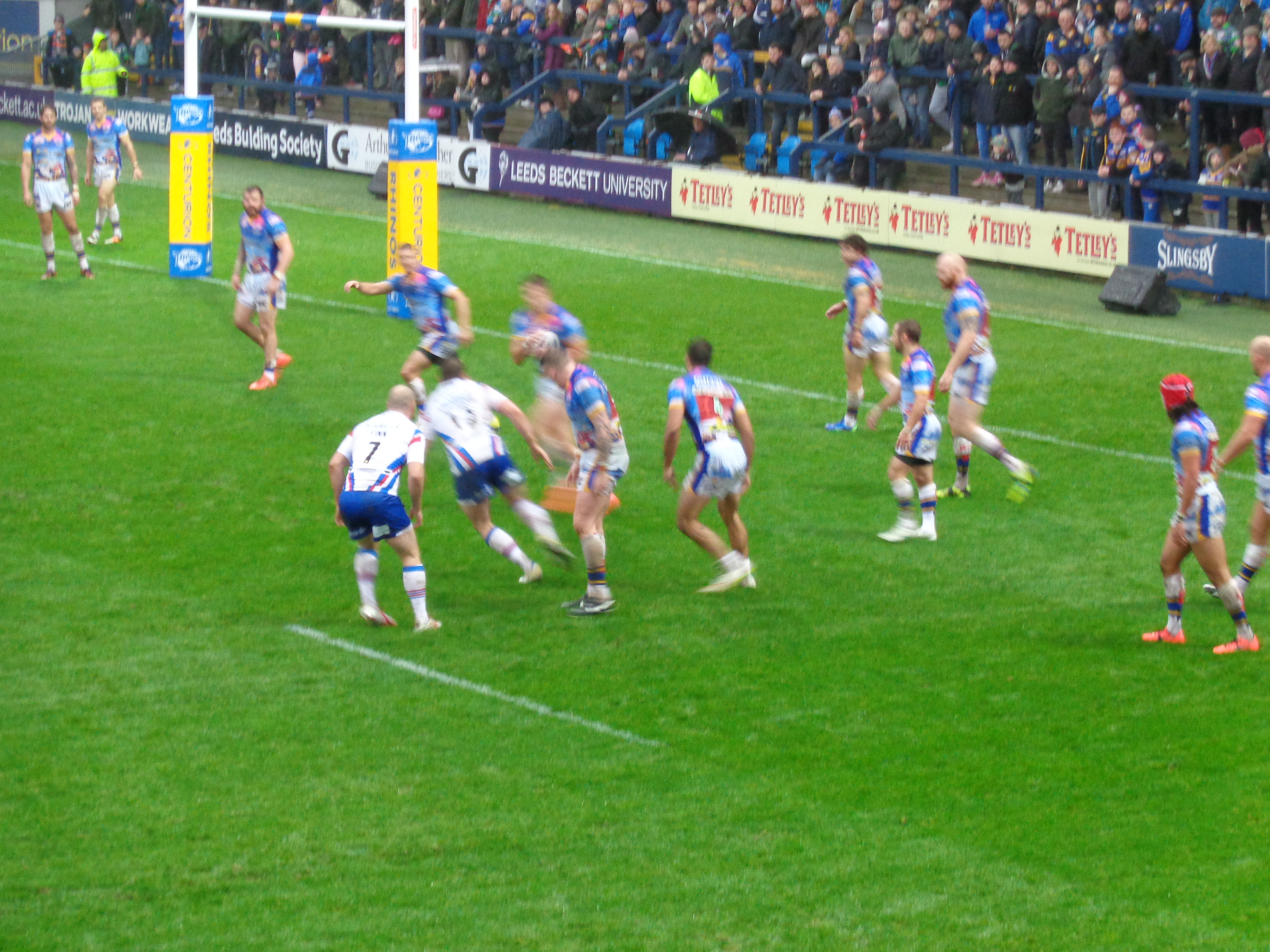
Wetherby Whaler sponsored the 2015 Festive Challenge between Leeds Rhinos and Wakefield Trinity.

Reviews of the Wetherby Whaler restaurants have been generally favourable. Yorkshire Life identified the Wetherby Whaler as one of the best fish and chip shops and the best gluten-free restaurant in Yorkshire. The Yorkshire Evening Post also placed the Leeds branch among its list of top restaurants in the city. The restaurants' gluten-free menus have received praise from several coeliac restaurant reviewers.

On National Fish and Chips Day, the restaurants offer a large meal as part of the "Impossible Fish 'n' Chips Challenge" which is traditionally attempted by local news reporters and restaurant reviewers, to varying degrees of success.

In January 2017, The Wetherby Whaler won the National Federation of Fish Friers Fish and Chip Quality Award after an inspection based on hygiene standards, staff training and food quality.

== Charity involvement ==
The Wetherby Whaler regularly sponsors regional awards including the Yorkshire Choice Awards and the Yorkshire Young Achievers Award.

In 2015, the Yorkshire Air Ambulance awarded the chain a corporate sponsor recognition award for the fundraising they have done since 2012.
