= Mugg & Bean =

Restaurant chain

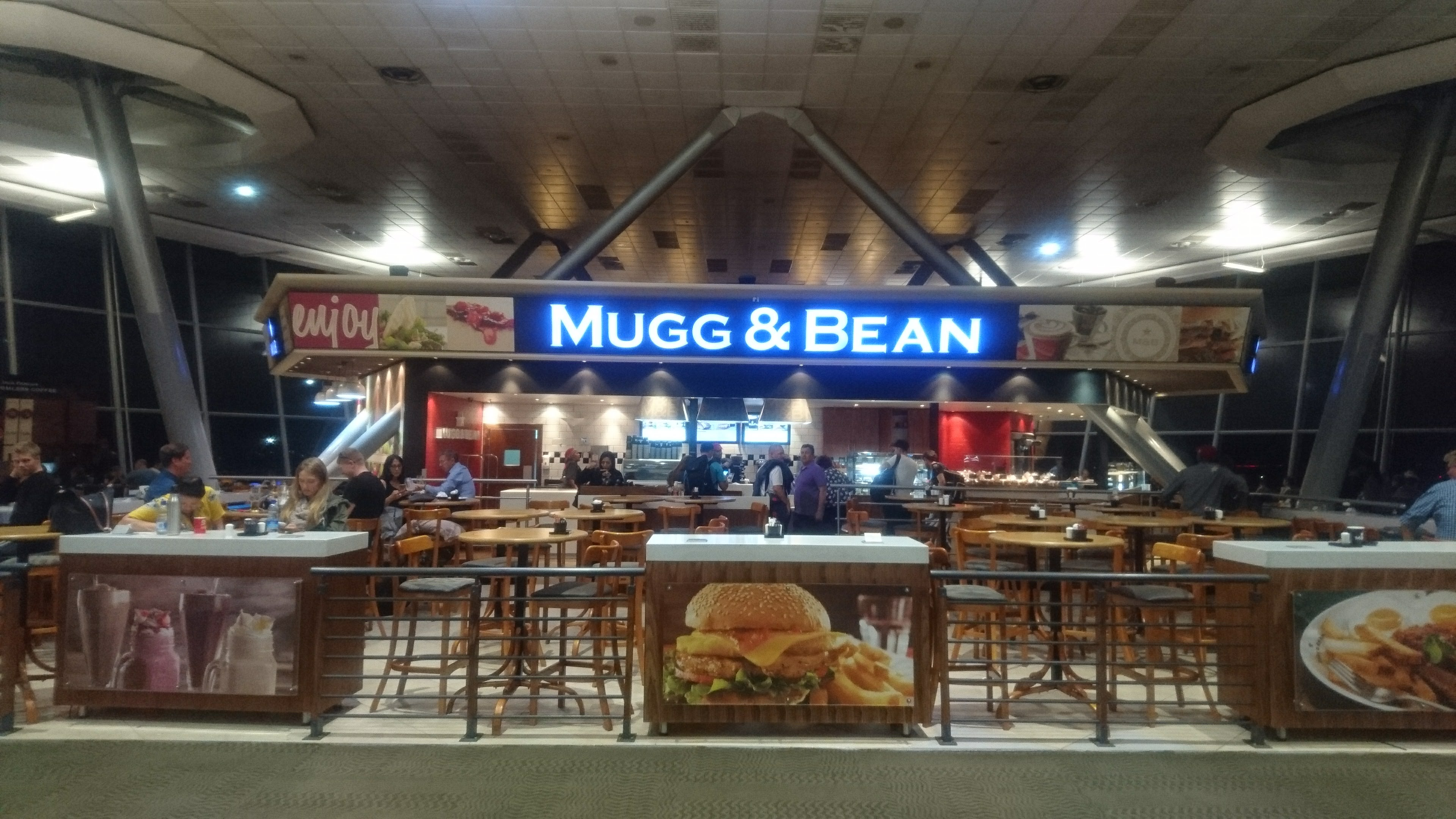
- A Mugg & Bean restaurant in O.R. Tambo International Airport.
- Industry: Restaurants
- Genre: Coffee & Generous Food
- Founded: Cape Town, South Africa (1996; 30 years ago)
- Founder: Ben Filmalter
- Headquarters: Midrand, South Africa
- Number of locations: 184 stores (2015)
- Products: Coffee; Burgers; Beverages; Baked goods; Salads; Sandwiches
- Parent: Famous Brands Limited
- Website: www.muggandbean.co.za

Mugg & Bean is a full-service coffee-themed restaurant franchise, founded in Cape Town, South Africa.

The restaurant chain was founded in 1996 by Ben Filmalter after a visit to a Chicago coffee shop in the early 1990s inspired him to open a similar restaurant in South Africa. The first restaurant was opened at the V&A Waterfront in Cape Town in 1996. The franchise was bought by Famous Brands in 2009.

As of 2015 they had 184 outlets throughout South Africa and the rest of Africa, as well as a number of overseas operations, including the United Arab Emirates and Kuwait.

== Controversy ==
In late 2018 and early 2019 Mugg & Bean was criticised by political parties and trade unions for alleged unfair labour practices. Trade union COSATU threatened to report the company to regulators for violating labour regulations relating to wages and working conditions.

In a separate incident the company was protested by the Economic Freedom Fighters political party when a restaurant manager was dismissed by a franchise owner amidst allegations of racism whilst the company stated that the manager was simply retrenched to cut costs.
