= Bath bus station =

Bus station in Somerset, England

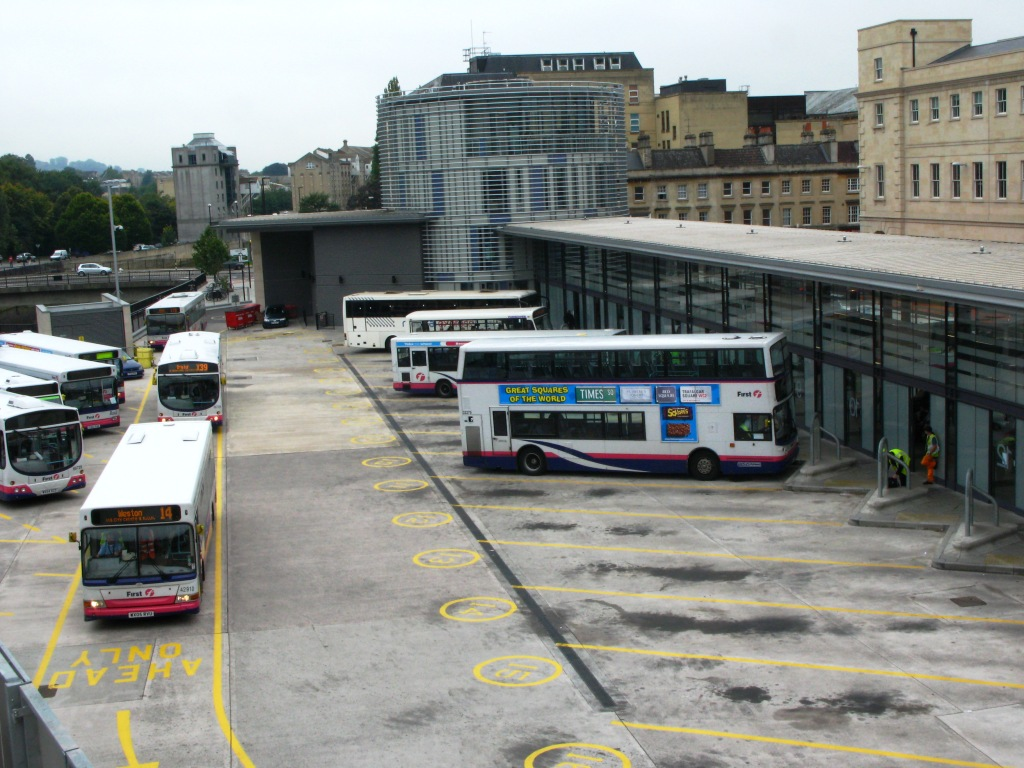
- The bus station in 2010

General information
- Location: Dorchester Street, Bath, Somerset; Bath and North East Somerset
- Coordinates: 51.3779°N 2.3591°W
- Operator: First West of England
- Bus routes: 1 Bus Station to Southdown 3 Upper Weston to Bathford; 4 Upper Weston to Odd Down; 5 Bus Station to Whiteway; 8 Bus Station to Kingsway; 13 Foxhill to Elmhurst; 19 Bath to Bristol Parkway Station; 39 Bath to Bristol via Keynsham; 171 Bath to Wells via Paulton; 172 Bath to Bristol via Midsomer Norton & Pensford; 173/174 Bath to Wells; 228 Bath to Colerne; 231 Bath to Chippenham; 271 Bath to Melksham; 272/273 Bath to Devizes; 522 Bath to Bristol via Midsomer Norton & Keynsham; 620 Bath to Stroud; 700 Bus Station to Sion Hill; 716 Bus Station to Newbridge; 734 Bus Station to Bathwick; A4 Bath to Bristol Airport via Keynsham & Hengrove; D1 Bath to Warminster; D1x Bath to Trowbridge; D2/D2x Bath to Frome; X31 Bath to Chippenham (direct via Corsham) X39 Bath to Bristol (direct along A4)
- Bus stands: 16
- Bus operators: First West of England; National Express; Stagecoach West; CT Coaches; Faresaver; FlixBus
- Connections: Bath Spa railway station (100 metres)

History
- Opened: 7 June 2009
Location

Bath bus station serves as part of an integrated transport interchange for the city of Bath, Somerset, England.

The Manvers Street bus station opened in 1958 and operated until 2009, when it was replaced by a new bus station, in Dorchester Street, as part of the Southgate regeneration programme.

The bus station is managed by First West of England. There are 16 bays. Bay 1 is for FlixBus and Bay 2 is for National Express coach services; bays 3 to 16 are for local bus services.

== History ==
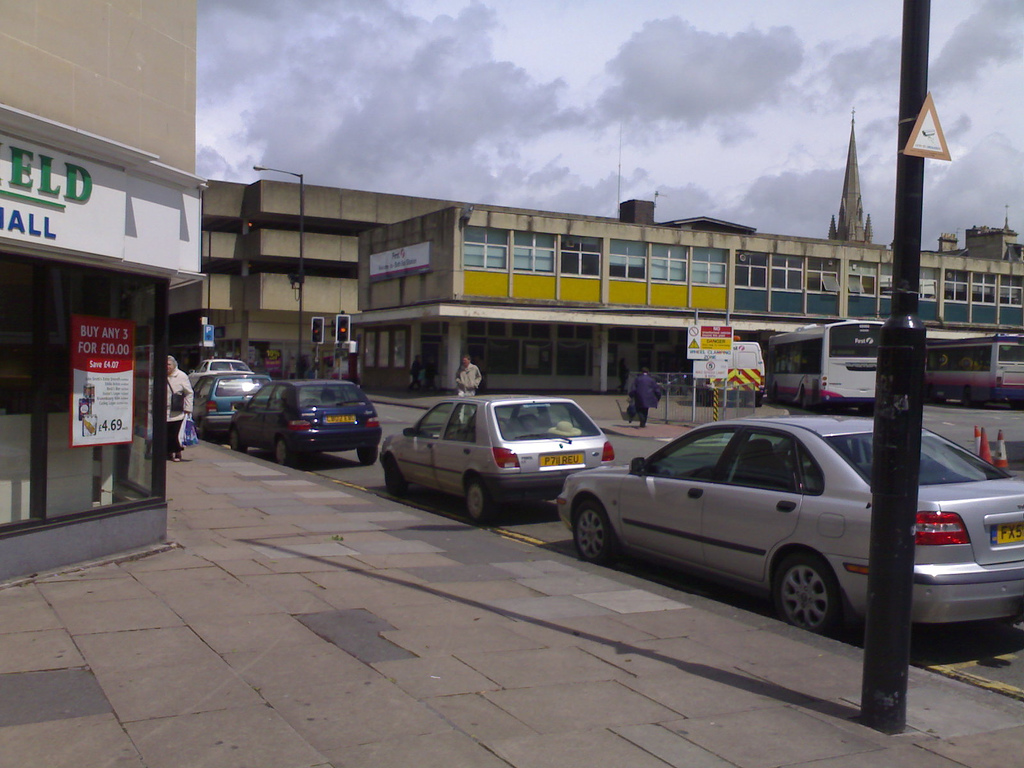
The old Bath Bus Station in 2006

The old Bath Bus Station, on Manvers Street, opened in 1958 under the control of the Bristol Omnibus Company. The Southgate area of the city, between Manvers Street to the east and St James' Parade to the west, was the area worst affected by the Baedeker Blitz of April 1942. The bus station was built as part of a project to replace this area of the city, where the city's main railway station, connecting Bath with Bristol and London was already situated. The bus station was located next to the city's red brick Victorian dairy, which showed lasting evidence of shell damage from the bombings. In this process, many of the city's older buildings and streets were destroyed to make way for not just the bus station, but also the Southgate Shopping Centre and accompanying Ham Gardens car park. The demolition of this maze of historical buildings was known as the Rape of Bath and was finally halted in the early 1960s due to public outcry. The city has since been designated a World Heritage Site and 95% of the buildings in the centre are protected by listed building status. The new development was seen as being a threat to the city's World Heritage Status.

The bus station operated a range of services during its 49-year history – including local city buses, country buses, National Express coach services and open-top bus tours. It has seen the Labour nationalisation and the Conservative privatisation of public transport, and the morphing of Bristol Omnibus into Badgerline, which was acquired by FirstGroup and rebranded as First Somerset & Avon.

== New bus station ==
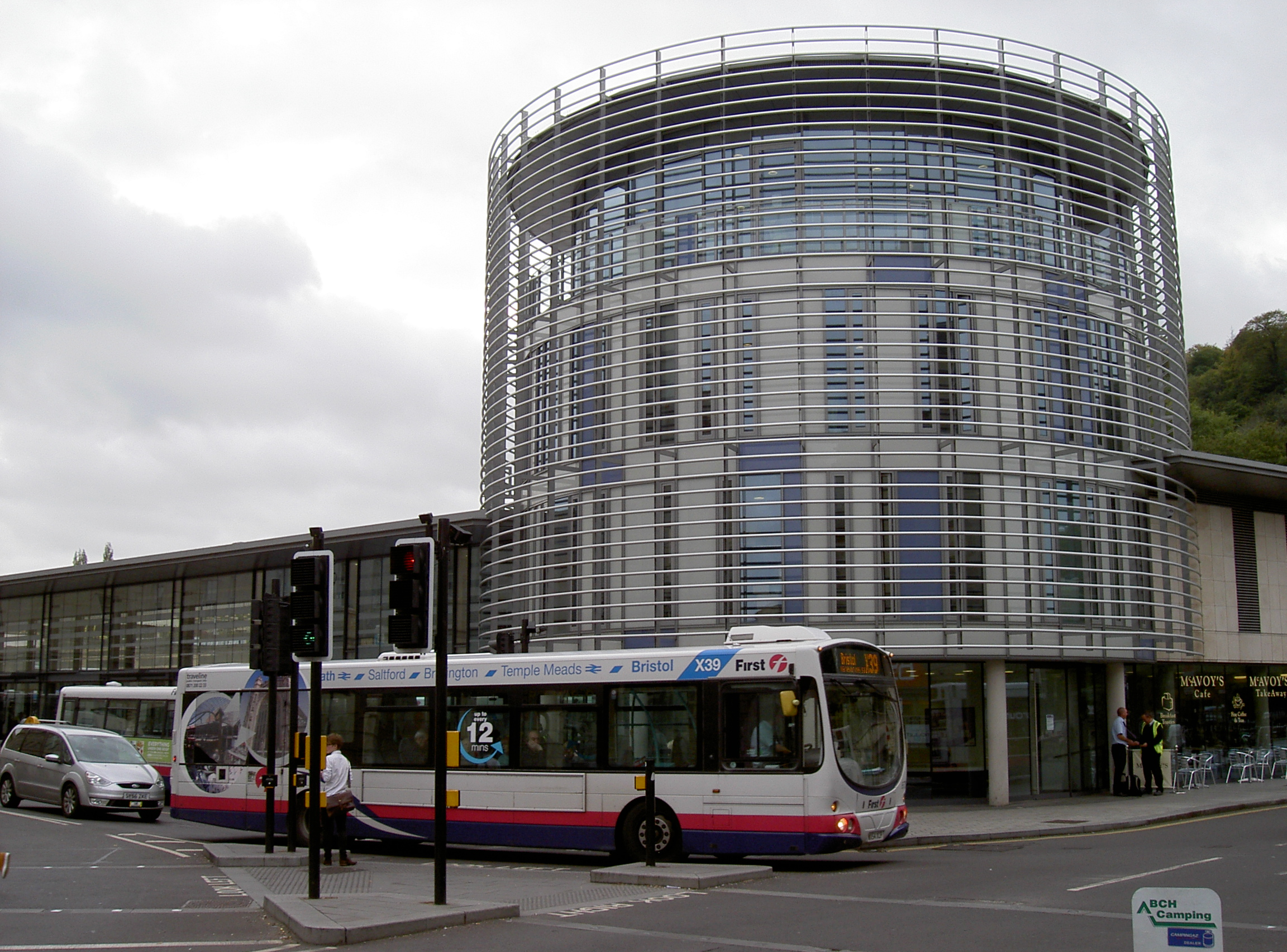
The 'Busometer'

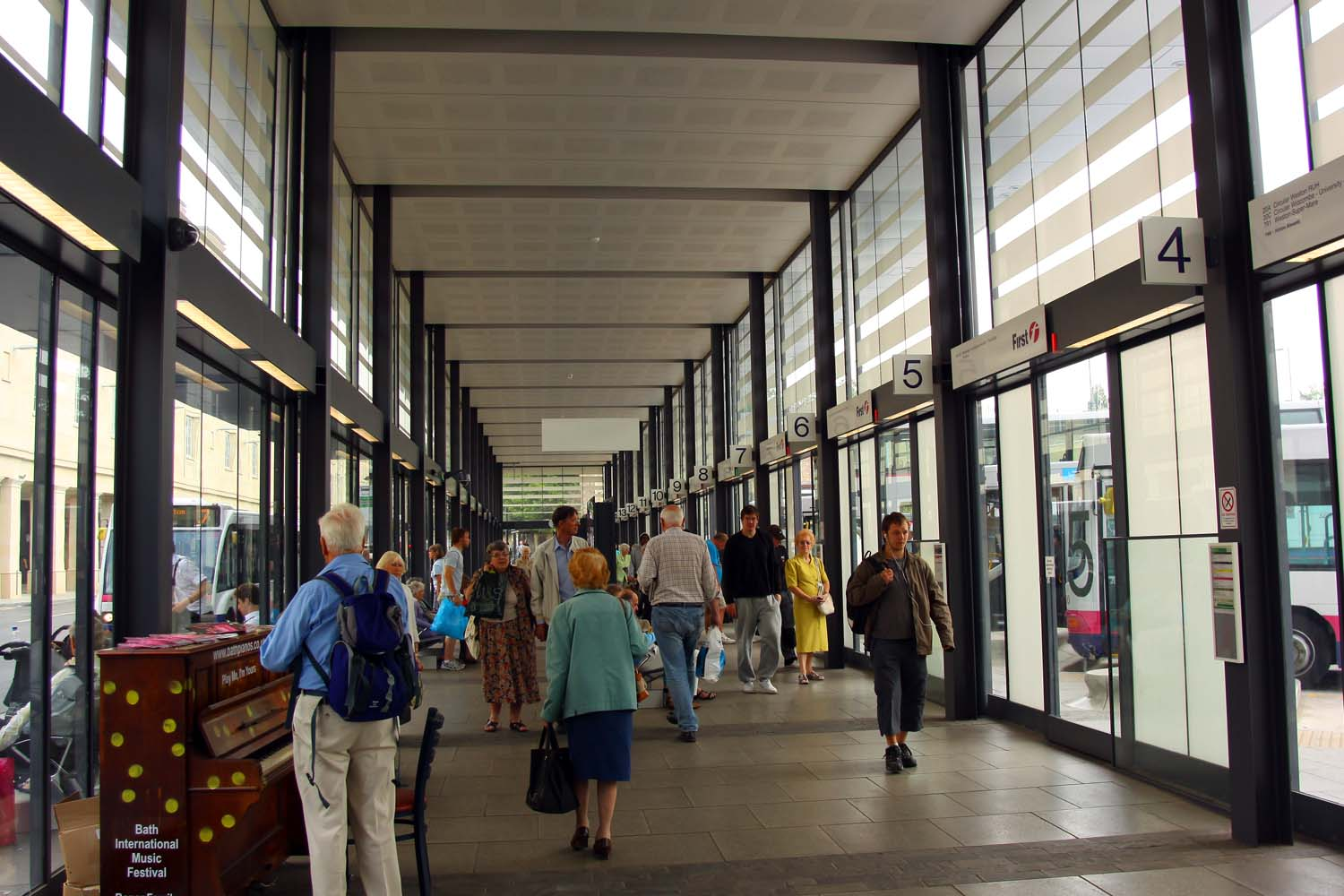
New Bath bus station

The Manvers Street Bus Station was scheduled to be demolished as part of the next Southgate regeneration programme for nearly 20 years. During this time, the building was owned by the local council and leased to First. Neither party was prepared to improve or repair the fabric of the building, as it was expected to be demolished. However, the redevelopment was plagued with controversy and continual demands for reviews, so the project did not get under way until early 2007, with the appointment of new contractors. The bus station was finally demolished in July 2007.

Operations for First Somerset & Avon moved to a temporary site constructed on the Avon Street Car Park on 16 June 2007. This was provided by contractors Sir Robert McAlpine as part of a move to speed up completion of the entire Southgate project by one year.

A new location for the bus station was chosen on the site of Churchill House – an abandoned 1920s electricity company building, the demolition of which sparked the most recent controversy to delay the whole project. Campaigners fighting for the preservation of the building argued that the frontage from Churchill House should be retained and incorporated into the design of the new bus station, but the architects maintained that this was not practical. Revised plans for a glass and metal rotunda – nicknamed derisively by local people as the "Busometer" – on the site close to Bath Spa railway station and on the edge of the River Avon were given council approval in early 2007 and work begun to construct this part of the transport interchange for the city.

The new Bath Bus Station opened on 7 June 2009, at a cost of £14 million, as part of the £360 million SouthGate development.
