= Richard Pennycook =

British businessperson

Richard Pennycook CBE
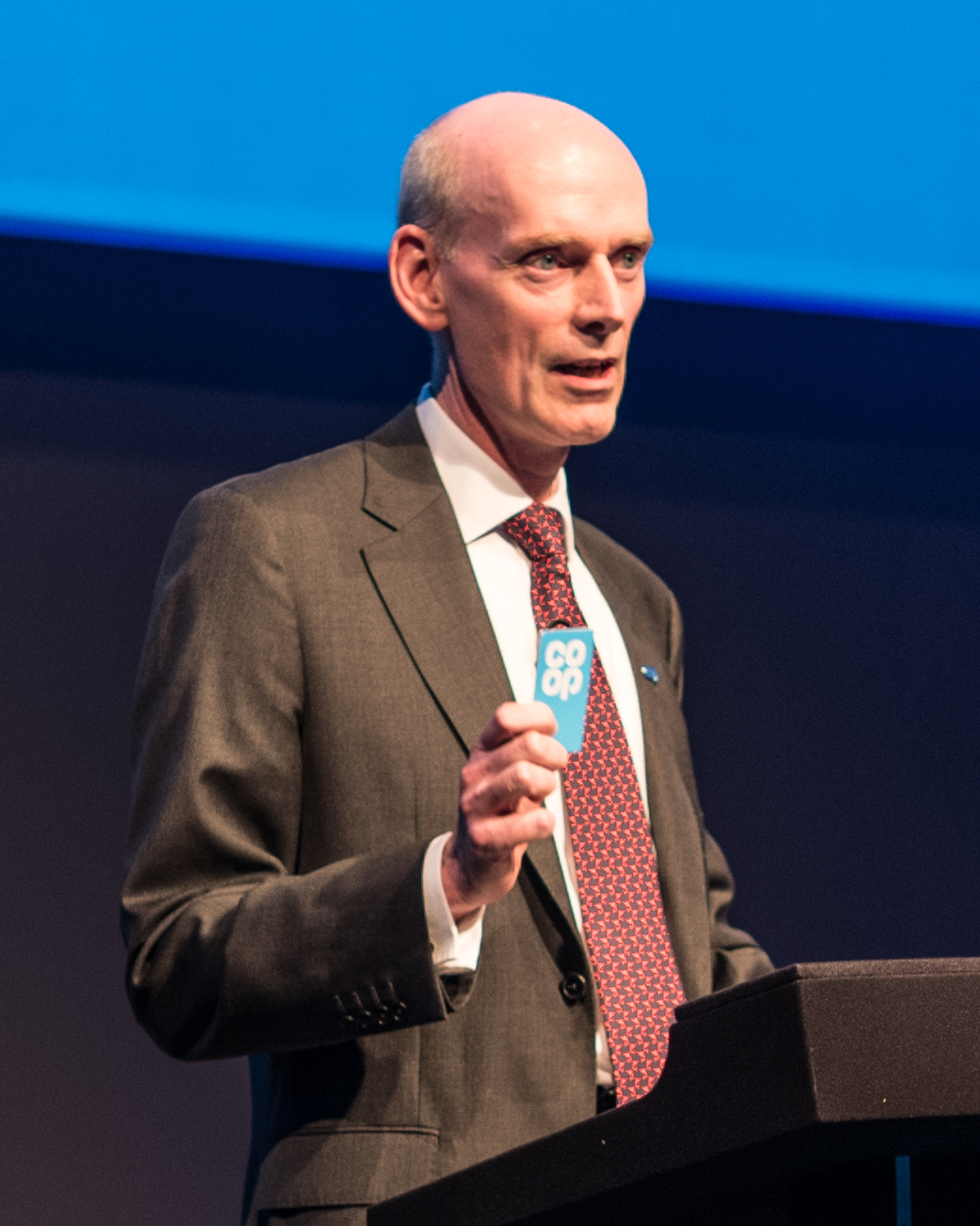
- Pennycook in 2016 at One Angel Square
- Born: Richard John Pennycook; February 1964 (age 62)

Richard John Pennycook CBE (born February 1964) is a businessman who was chief executive officer of the Co-operative Group.

Pennycook took the position as CEO in 2014 after being named Chief Financial Officer in 2013.

In 2013, he became Chairman of The Hut Group, an online retailer in North-West England with multiple brands.

In 2016, he received The Retail Leader of the Year award at the prestigious Retail Week Awards.

In February 2017, Pennycook stepped down as CEO of The Co-operative Group after three years at the helm, with Steve Murrells (previously CEO of Co-op Food division) taking charge.

Pennycook was appointed Commander of the Order of the British Empire (CBE) in the 2020 Birthday Honours for services to retail.
