= Harry Ramsden's =

British fast food restaurant chain

Harry Ramsden's Group Limited
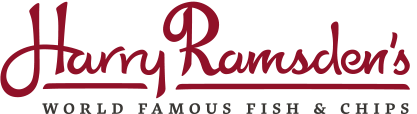
- Industry: Fast food restaurants
- Founded: 1928; 98 years ago
- Founder: Harry Ramsden (1888–1963)
- Headquarters: London, England, UK
- Key people: James Fleming (CEO)
- Products: Fish and chips and themed dishes
- Parent: Deep Blue Restaurants Ltd
- Website: harryramsdens.co.uk

Harry Ramsden's Group Limited is a fast food restaurant chain based in the United Kingdom which offers fish and chips and assorted themed dishes. Founded by restaurant entrepreneur Harry Ramsden in Guiseley, West Yorkshire, in 1928, it was sold to his partner in 1954. Since then it has a succession of corporate owners: Associated Fisheries, Merryweathers, Granada, Compass, SSP, BVL and Deep Blue.

== Early history ==
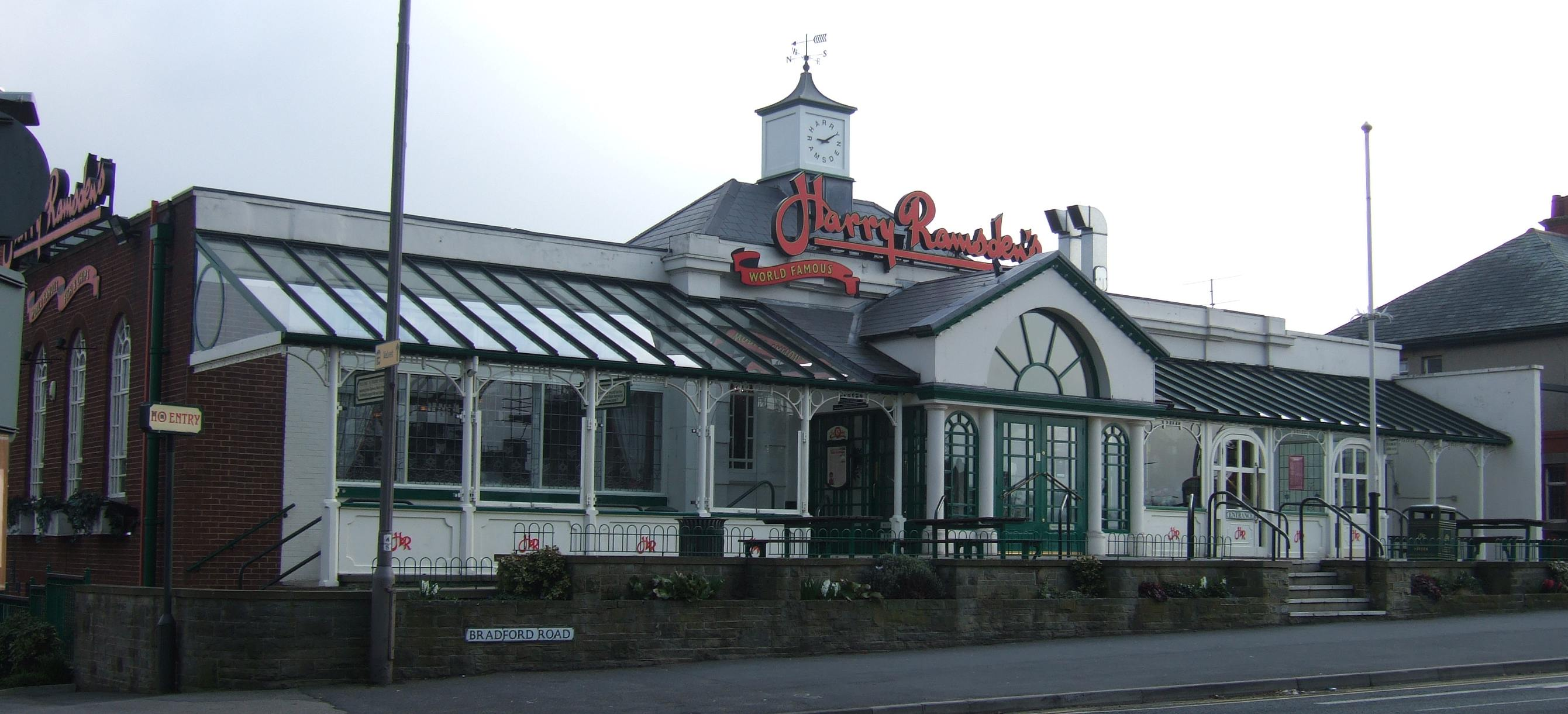
The Guiseley branch of Harry Ramsden's in 2007

The business was started by Harry Ramsden (10 February 1888 – 1963) in 1928 in a wooden hut in White Cross, Guiseley, West Yorkshire, northern England. Three years later, he moved into a new premises, complete with fitted carpets, oak panelled walls, and chandeliers. The original hut was demolished in 2012, as a result of its poor condition and asbestos content. The adjacent main restaurant, which replaced it, once held the Guinness World Record for the largest fish and chip shop in the world, seating 250 people and serving nearly a million customers a year. Harry Corbett of Sooty fame was a nephew of Harry Ramsden's, and played the piano in his uncle's original restaurant.

In 1954, the business was sold to Harry Ramsden's long-term business partner Eddie Stokes for the (then) large sum of £37,500, and subsequently in 1965 to Essex-based Associated Fisheries.

== Expansion ==
In 1988, the company, which still comprised the original Guiseley fish and chips premises, was bought by Merryweathers, led by Chairmen John Barnes and Richard Richardson. Barnes and Richardson led the transition of the business from a single restaurant in Yorkshire to an international chain.

In 1989, following a decision by their bank to withdraw funding, the management floated the company on the London Stock Exchange. The public offer was over-subscribed two and a half times over. The next ten years saw rapid expansion throughout the UK and worldwide, through company-owned and franchised restaurants. Locations outside the UK included Hong Kong, Australia, Epcot and Saudi Arabia.

A franchise deal with Granada motorway services to develop kiosk-style units ultimately led to Granada Ltd buying Harry Ramsden's for £20 million in October 1999. When acquired by Granada, Harry Ramsden's comprised four company-owned restaurants, twenty-five franchises and sixteen Henry Higgins units. Granada expanded Harry Ramsden's into motorway locations. Some franchise territories infringed onto motorways, so Granada bought the franchises back. In 2000, Compass merged with Granada. Under Compass, the business was expanded into motorway service station kiosks, contract catering locations such as schools, Post Office canteens, Little Chef, Butlins, and Haven Holidays. The last Harry Ramsden's on the motorway network, at Gretna Green, closed in August 2022. In 2026, nearly 4 years after closing its final motorway services location, Harry Ramsden's made a return with a new restaurant at Baldock Services.

In 1999, the company began operating a quick-service kiosk in Walt Disney World's Epcot in the United Kingdom pavilion. Branded and operated by Harry Ramsden's, the restaurant was added to provide traditional fish and chips in time for the park's Millennium celebration. The branding remained until a renovation in 2006, when its name became Yorkshire County Fish Shop. Despite the name change, the location was still sponsored and operated by Harry Ramsden's until 2010.

While earlier restaurant chains existed in the UK, such as Samuel Isaacs' chain of 22 fish and chip restaurants, the first of which opened in 1896, Harry Ramsden's website claimed their business to be "Britain's longest-established restaurant chain".

== SSP, Boporan, and Deep Blue ownership ==
By April 2006, Compass had spun off its motorway service stations to Moto, bought by Macquarie Bank of Sydney, Australia. Its specialist airports and railways division, SSP, was sold for £1,822 million to EQT AB of Sweden (who also own Findus). Harry Ramsden's was sold with the SSP business. Under the early years of SSP ownership, the business had to compete with other SSP brands for investment. In 2008, SSP recruited industry turnaround specialist Chris Sullivan as managing director. During 2009, Sullivan led a radical revision of the food on offer, improving quality, reducing wait times and removing menu items which were deemed to be more pub-restaurant than chip shop. The strategy delivered a marked improvement in sales in the food court and seaside restaurant business of Harry Ramsden's, prompting parent company SSP to market the business for sale.

On 19 January 2010, SSP sold Harry Ramsden's to Boparan Ventures Limited. BVL is the private investment vehicle for Ranjit Boparan. BVL planned to open another 100 units in the following five years and create 600 new jobs.

On 29 November 2011, it was announced that the original Harry Ramsden's restaurant in Guiseley would close, amid statements from the owners that it was losing money and that any refurbishment to make it profitable would not be viable. The restaurant closed on Monday 19 December 2011. In February 2012, it was announced that the Guiseley restaurant had been sold to the Wetherby Whaler group. It reopened on 22 May 2012 under the Wetherby Whaler name.

The Bournemouth branch of Harry Ramsden's in April 2009

BVL continued to invest in the Harry Ramsden's brand, with the Bournemouth branch briefly holding the title of World's Largest Fish and Chip Restaurant, seating 417 across its restaurant, cafe and terrace, before being surpassed in 2017.

During August 2019, Boparan Ventures Limited sold Harry Ramsden's to rival Deep Blue Restaurants for an undisclosed sum. The move saw Reigate-based Deep Blue acquire the Harry Ramsden's 34-strong estate, including 15 standalone restaurants, plus a combination of franchises in the UK and in Malaysia.

== Undercover Boss ==
In 2010, the chain was the focus of an episode of the Channel 4 television series Undercover Boss. The then-CEO of the company, Marija Simovic, posed as a new starter in a variety of locations – Swindon, Merry Hill Shopping Centre, Blackpool, Southampton and Great Yarmouth – to try to understand why the company was struggling. At the end of the programme, Simovic promised big changes in a bid to turn around the company's fortunes, along with promoting a number of employees who had impressed her. Simovic left the company in 2011.

== Licensing ==
The Harry Ramsden's brand is licensed to Princes Group for tinned mushy peas and to Birds Eye for frozen fish.

== See also ==
- List of fish and chip restaurants
- List of seafood restaurants
