= Gourmet Burger Kitchen =

Restaurant chain based in Birmingham, England

- Type: Subsidiary
- Industry: Restaurants Franchising
- Headquarters: Birmingham, England
- Number of locations: 10
- Area served: UK
- Key people: Peter Gordon
- Products: New Zealand cuisine
- Net income: £5.9 million (2022)
- Number of employees: 400
- Parent: Boparan Restaurant Group
- Website: www.gbk.co.uk

Previous logo

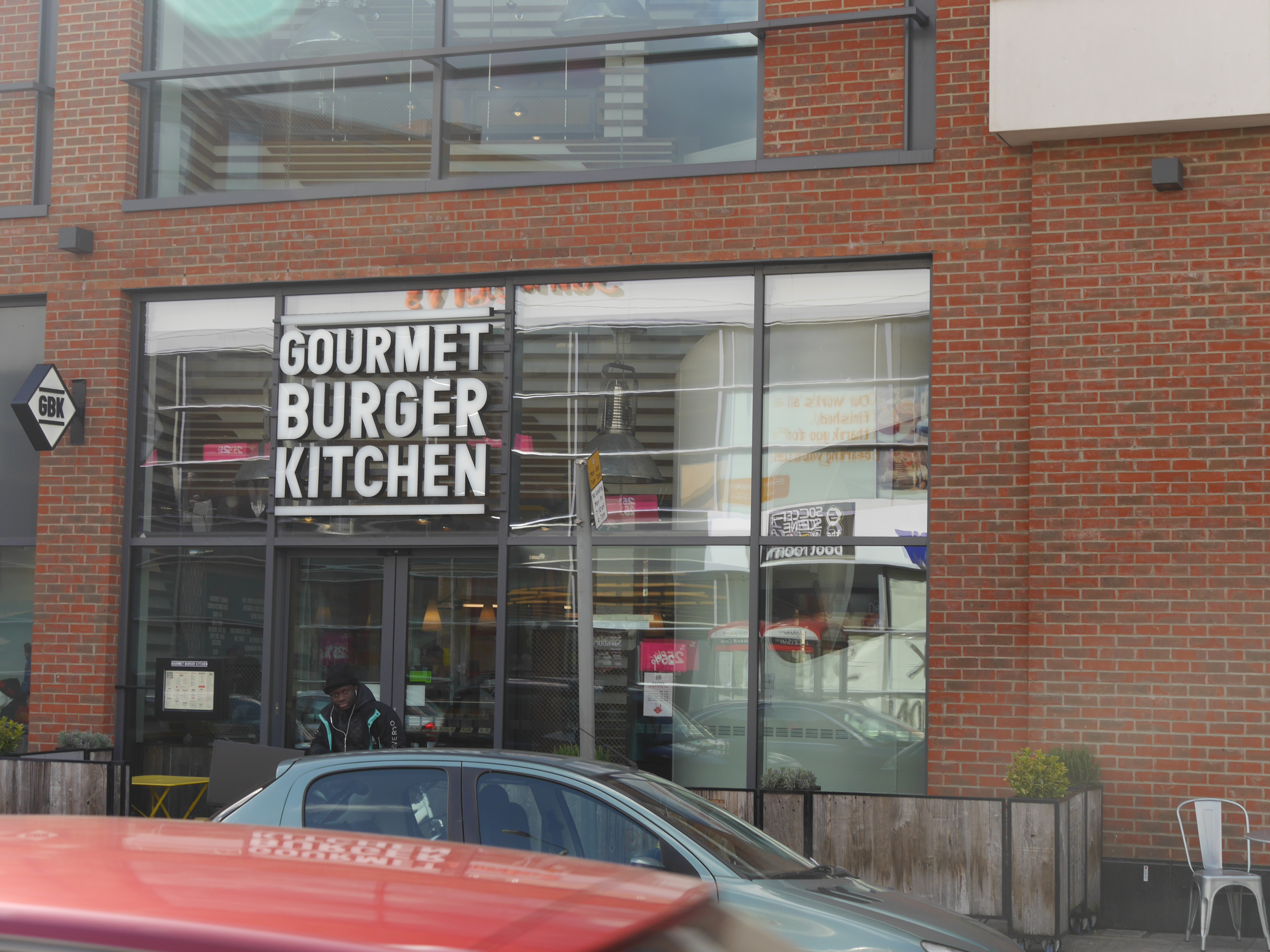
Gourmet Burger Kitchen, Southside Wandsworth, London

Gourmet Burger Kitchen (GBK) is a chain of luxury restaurants in the United Kingdom and Ireland specialising in gourmet burgers. There is a subtle Kiwi theme throughout the restaurants, a reference to the heritage of the original owners.

== History ==
The company was started in London by New Zealanders Adam Wills, Greg Driscoll, and Brandon Allen in 2001. Chef Peter Gordon, a New Zealand-born, London-based chef, oversaw the menu development and the first restaurant opened in 2001, bringing the concept of 'gourmet burgers' to London. GBK is known for its "large" burgers, fresh produce and casual service style. The initial success of the Battersea restaurant led to further openings across London.

In 2005, the owners sold the business to Clapham House Group PLC who added a total of 53 restaurants across the UK. In 2010 the restaurant chain was sold to Capricorn Ventures, most notable for operating Nando's. GBK expanded to 60 restaurants across the UK, and had plans to continue growing. Franchises operate in Ireland, Dubai, Greece and Oman.

In September 2016, the South African firm Famous Brands bought the company for US$143.3 million. In August 2018, the company reported huge losses due to a decline in sales.

In October 2018, Gourmet Burger Kitchen reported a £47m loss amid tough trading conditions. Later that month, Gourmet Burger Kitchen announced plans to close 17 restaurants.

In October 2020, it was announced that Ranjit Singh Boparan had acquired the company from administration. However, as part of the deal, 26 restaurants would remain closed, with the loss of 362 jobs. 35 restaurants will remain open.

The business continued to perform poorly over the coming years, and by 2026 had shrunk to 10 outlets, mainly in London and the Home Counties

== See also ==
- List of hamburger restaurants
- New Zealand cuisine
