= Slim Chickens =

American fast casual restaurant chain

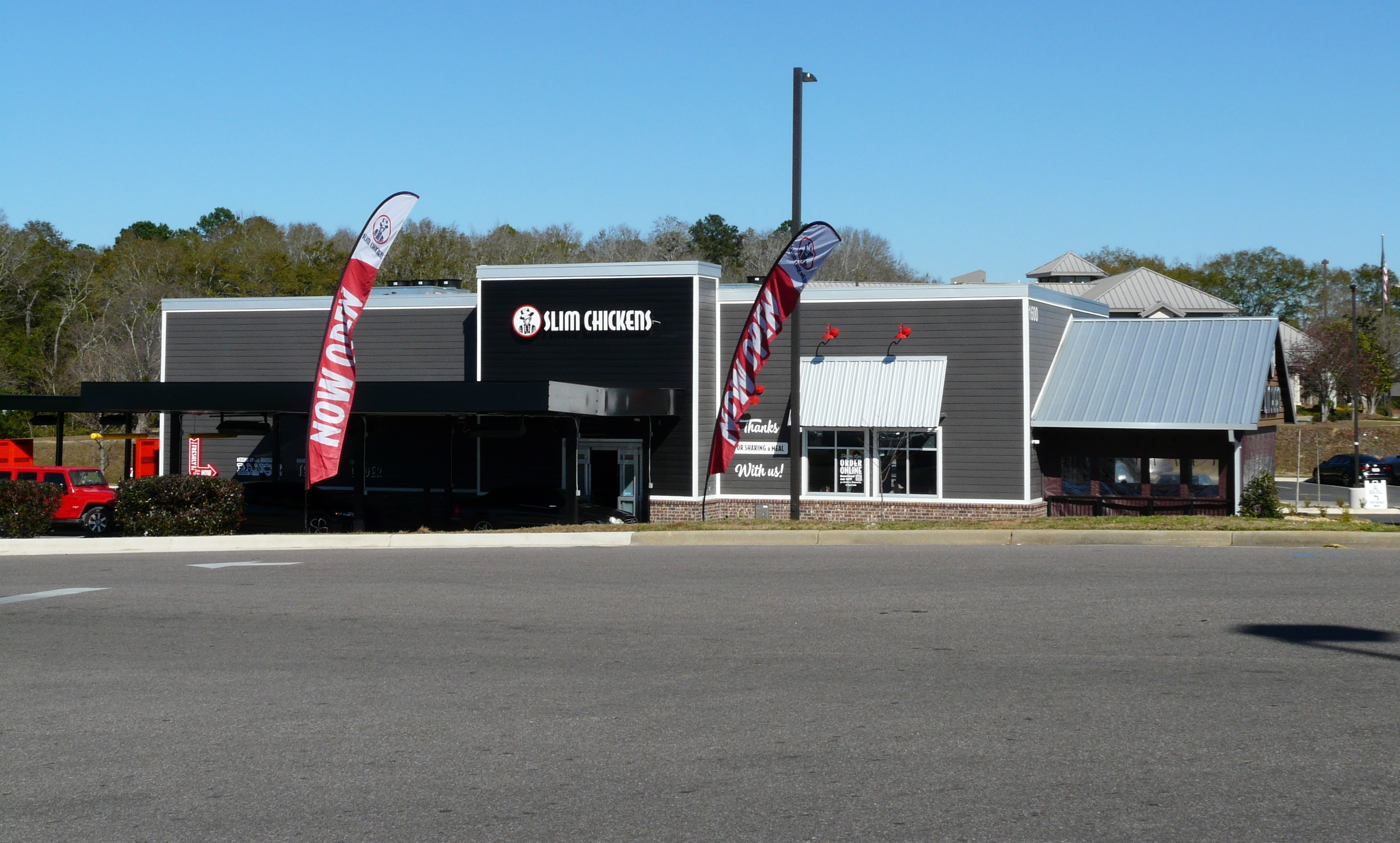
- location in Dothan, Alabama
- Type: Private
- Industry: Restaurants
- Genre: Fast casual
- Founded: 2003; 23 years ago Fayetteville, Arkansas, U.S.
- Headquarters: Fayetteville, Arkansas, U.S.
- Number of locations: 291 as of June 14, 2025
- Areas served: Malaysia, United States, United Kingdom, Germany, Turkey, Ireland
- Key people: Tom Gordon (CEO, Co-founder) Greg Smart (CBO, Co-founder), Maddi Slims (Youth executive)
- Website: slimchickens.com

Slim Chickens is an American fast-casual restaurant chain which specializes in chicken tenders, wings, sandwiches, salads, wraps, chicken and waffles, and other items. It was founded in 2003 by Greg Smart and Tom Gordon.

== History ==
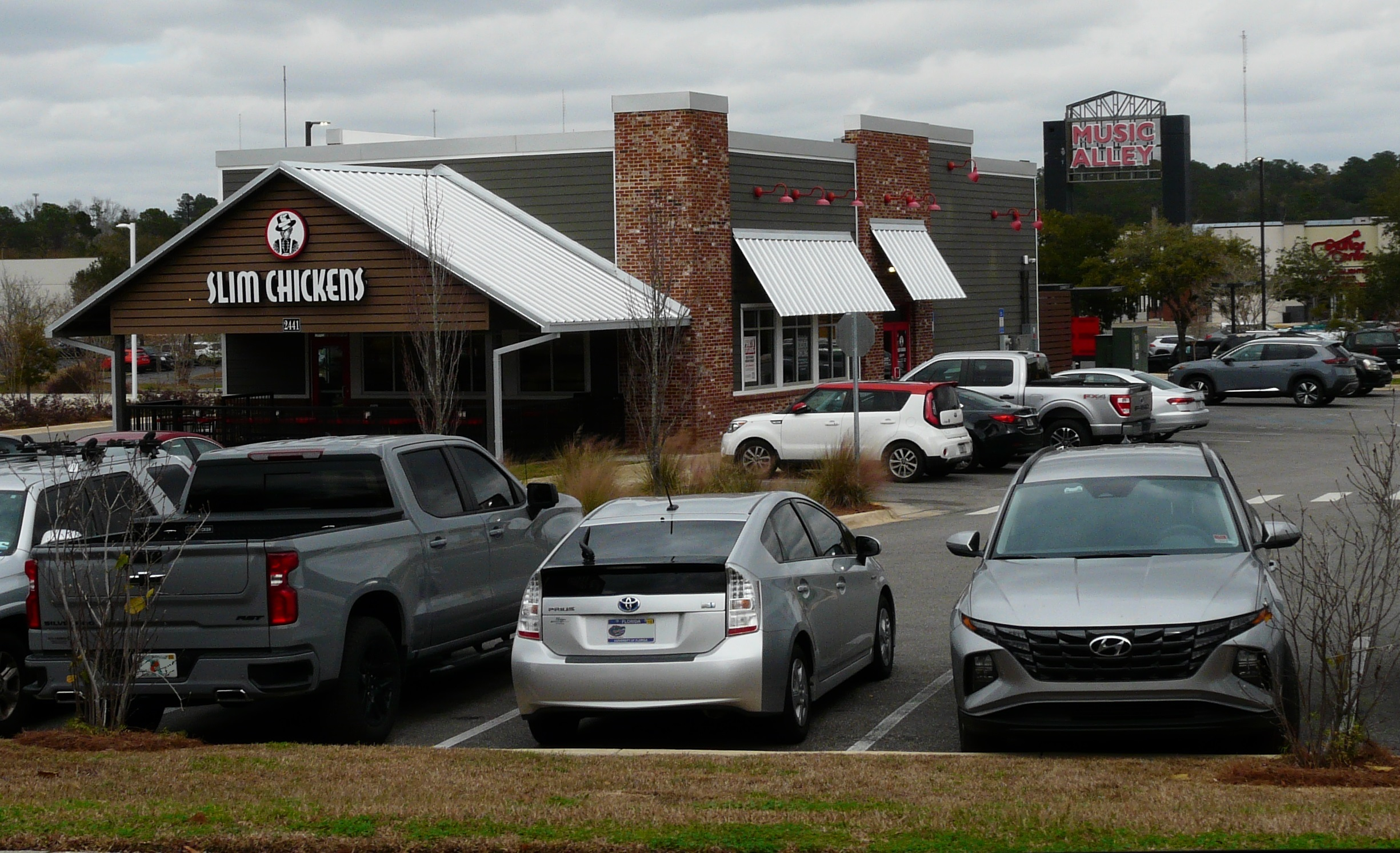
Slim Chickens in Tallahassee, Florida

The first location opened in 2003 at 2120 N. College Avenue in Fayetteville, Arkansas, inside a building formerly home to a sushi restaurant. In 2005, the second location opened in the nearby city of Rogers. The chain's expansion accelerated in 2008 with five more company-owned locations opening in Arkansas and Oklahoma. In 2013, the first franchise location was opened in Texarkana, Arkansas, by businessman Greg McKay.

The company has since expanded with more than 100 locations in 19 states, with international locations in the UK and Kuwait. The 100th location opened in Little Rock, Arkansas, on December 18, 2020.

== 10 Point Capital and 600 Restaurant Goal ==
Slim Chickens in 2019 announced a minority investment by 10 Point Capital. CEO Tom Gordon said the investment would help the company toward its stated goal of opening 600 locations in the next 10 years.

== International expansion ==
In a partnership with Persian Gulf company Alghanim Industries, the first international Slim Chickens opened in Salmiya, Kuwait, in May 2017. This location has since closed in 2022.

The first UK location opened in London at 35 James Street in March 2018 via a partnership with Boparan Restaurant Group. A Cardiff branch opened in St David's 2 shopping centre in 2019. A Bristol branch opened in 2019 in the shopping area of Cabot Circus. A branch of this restaurant chain opened in Birmingham. The first branch in Kent, England, opened in Bluewater Shopping Centre in February 2020. In 2021, branches were opened in Bournemouth, Southampton and Plymouth. In 2023, branches in Bury St Edmunds and Crawley opened. As of May 2026, there are currently over 70 branches open in the UK.

The first Turkish location opened on July 23rd, 2023 at Istanbul Airport. The first German location opened August 24, 2024 in Berlin. The first Malaysian location opened July 15, 2025 in Subang Jaya. Meanwhile, the first Irish location opened December 3, 2025 in Dublin.
