= Ranjit Singh Boparan =

British businessman (born 1966)

- Born: 24 August 1966 (age 59); Bilston, West Midlands, England
- Occupation: Businessman
- Title: Founder and owner of 2 Sisters Food Group
- Spouse: Baljinder Kaur Boparan
- Children: Antonio Singh Boparan

Ranjit Singh Boparan (Punjabi: ਰਨਜੀਤ ਸਿੰਘ ਬੋਪਰਨ, born 24 August 1966) is a British businessman, and the founder and owner of 2 Sisters Food Group with his wife Baljinder Kaur Boparan. Known as the "Chicken King" in the West Midlands, he has an estimated personal fortune of £600 million.

== Early career ==
Born in August 1966 in Bilston, West Midlands, Boparan left school aged 16 with few qualifications. He started working in a butchers shop, and founded 2 Sisters Food Group in 1993 with a small bank loan. Still resident today in the West Midlands, he began expanding West Bromwich-based 2 Sisters Food Group through its holding company Boparan Holdings, which he jointly owns with his wife.

== Boparan Holdings ==
Boparan Holdings is the group company, which owns all of the couple's subsidiary holdings. An undercover investigation by ITV News and The Guardian in September 2017 found workers illegally changing the slaughter dates — and hence the use-by dates — at a 2 Sisters plant in West Bromwich.

=== 2 Sisters Food Group ===
2 Sisters Food Group is a Birmingham, England-based food-manufacturing company.

Established in 1993 by Ranjit Singh Boparan as a frozen retail cutting operation, it has grown rapidly through acquisition and expanded to cover 36 manufacturing sites in the UK, eight in the Netherlands, five in Ireland and one in Poland.

The group employs 23,000 people, and annual sales of £3.28 billion. It is listed 9th on the 2017 Sunday Times Top Track 100. It is the largest food company in the UK by turnover.

=== Northern Foods ===
Following a period of asset disposal, on 17 November 2010 Northern Foods announced it was merging with Irish ready-made meals supplier, Greencore. According to industry web site, just-food.com, the company's shares rose more than 20% that day. The new company was to be called Essenta, with headquarters in Ireland but listed on the London Stock Exchange.

However, after building up a 25% share holdings, on 21 January 2011 Boparan announced a £341M bid to buy Northern Foods, which succeeded in gaining sufficient shareholder support to proceed. This resulted in the appointment of Boparan as the company's chairman in April 2011. On 13 May 2011 the company was delisted from the London Stock Exchange, and taken private under Boparan Holdings.

=== FishWorks ===
FishWorks is a seafood restaurant chain, originally started by Mitch Tonks.

=== Harry Ramsden's ===
In April 2006, Compass Group sold its specialist airports and railways division SSP for £1,822 million to EQT AB of Sweden, including the Harry Ramsden's fish and chip shop chain. After attempting a turnaround under new MD Chris Sullivan in 2008, on 19 January 2010 SSP sold Harry Ramsden's to Boparan Ventures Ltd, the private investment vehicle of Boparan. BVL announced plans to open another 100 units in the next five years, and create 600 new jobs.

=== Cinnamon Collection ===
In January 2016, Boparan Restaurant Holdings (BRH) acquired the three-strong Cinnamon Collection chain of restaurants in London, an upmarket Indian outlet.

=== Grove Farm Turkey ===
In April 2016, the Boparan Private Office acquired Irish Turkey business Grove Farm.

=== Giraffe Restaurants ===
In June 2016, the supermarket chain Tesco announced that it was to sell its 15-venue Giraffe Restaurants chain to Boparan Restaurants, for "an undisclosed sum", three years after it bought the chain for £50 million.

=== Bernard Matthews ===
In September 2016, it was announced Singh's Private Office (Boparan Private Office) was to acquire turkey producer Bernard Matthews for £87.5m.

=== Ed's Easy Diner ===
In October 2016, Singh's Private Office added to its restaurant and dining portfolio with the acquisition of part of the 1950s-themed restaurant chain Ed's Easy Diner.

== Family and personal life ==
Ranjit Boparan received an honorary doctorate from Nottingham Trent University in July 2015, "in recognition of his significant contribution to the food manufacturing industry, to education and the development of his workforce, and for his philanthropic interests."
