= Giraffe World Kitchen =

British restaurant chain

Giraffe Concepts Limited
- Trade name: Giraffe
- Type: Subsidiary
- Genre: Restaurant (chain)
- Founded: 1998
- Founder: Juliette Joffe; Russel Joffe; Andrew Jacobs
- Number of locations: 3 (UK); 6 (UK Airports); 1 (Bengaluru Airport); 1 (Barcelona Airport); 1 (Doha Airport); 1 (Dubai Airport); 2 (Málaga Airport)
- Parent: Boparan Holdings
- Website: giraffe.net

Giraffe Concepts Limited, trading as Giraffe or Giraffe World Kitchen, is a restaurant chain headquartered in Birmingham, United Kingdom, which was founded in 1998 in Hampstead as Giraffe Restaurants, by Juliette Joffe, Russel Joffe, and Andrew Jacobs. Giraffe was owned by its founders, with additional financial backing from private shareholders, 3i investment group and chairman Luke Johnson.

In October 2006, 3i invested £10 million in the company in a deal that valued the chain at £24 million. In March 2013, the chain was announced to be acquired by Tesco for £48.6 million. As part of the acquisition, 3i and Risk Capital Partners sold their shares in the company. In June 2016, Tesco reached an agreement to sell the company to Boparan Holdings.

== Branches ==
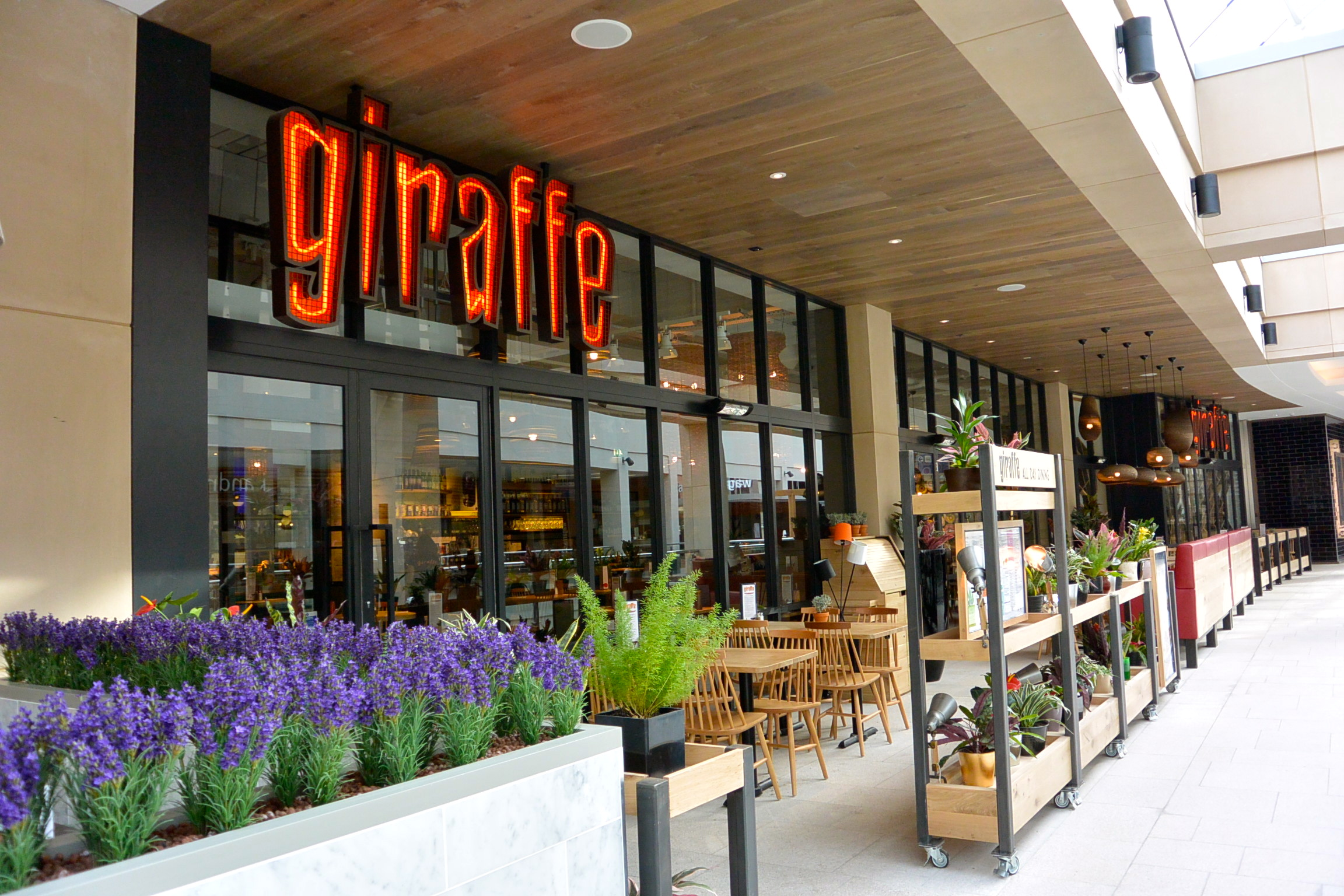
Giraffe at Trinity Leeds (March 2013)

As of August 2022, the company has 12 outlets across the UK plus three at Dubai Airport in the United Arab Emirates and two at Malaga Airport in Spain.

In September 2016, the company introduced a new brand, Giraffe World Kitchen, with its first branch in Basingstoke. The brand then had 45 restaurants in the UK and four in the United Arab Emirates. In March 2019, though, Boparan announced that 20 branches had been tagged for closure “to protect the company”, which had made a pretax loss of £10 million on sales of £67 million.
