= List of British Sikhs =

This is a list of notable Sikhs from the United Kingdom.

== Academia and education ==
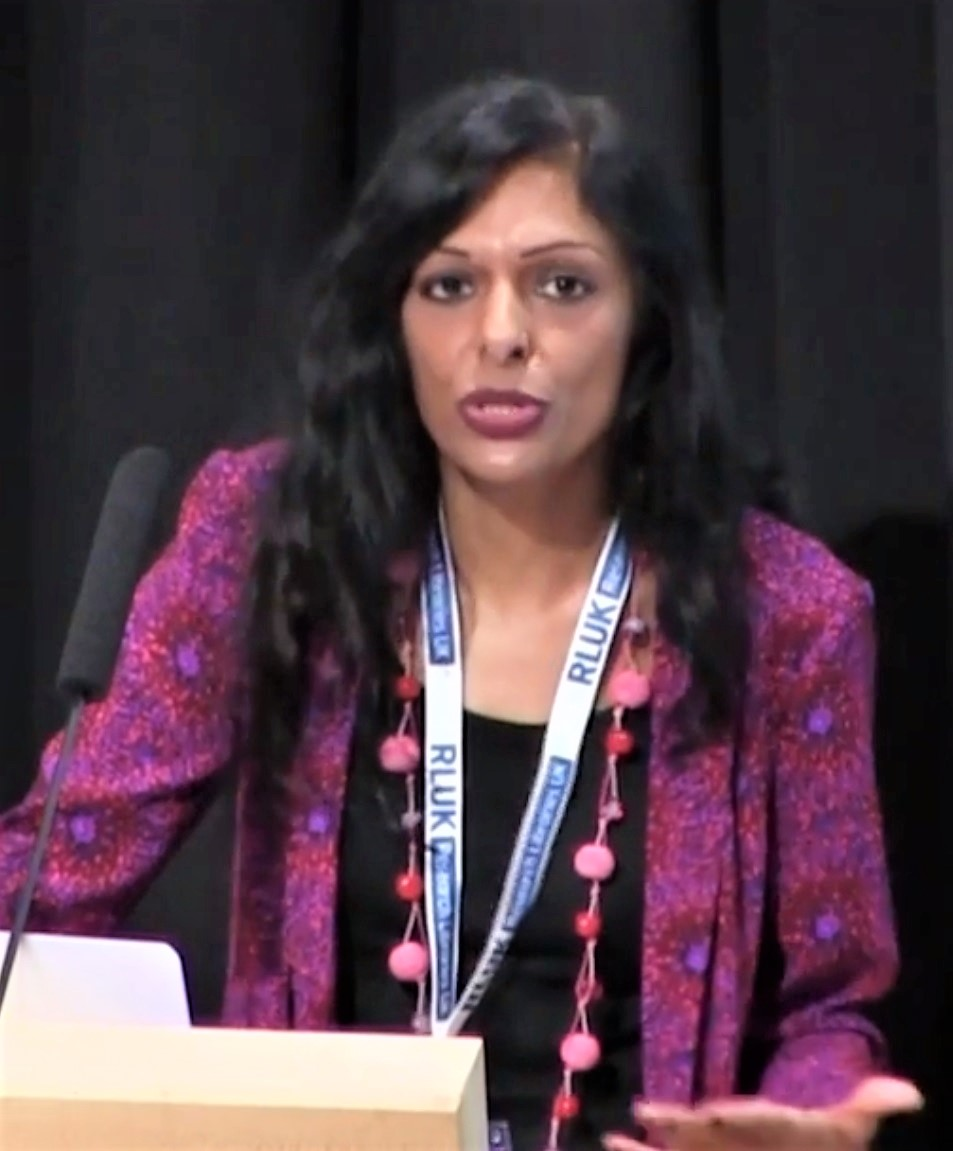
Prof Kalwant Bhopal at Research Libraries UK conference

- Harjinder Singh Dilgeer – National Professor of Sikh History. Director of SGPC
- Harminder Dua – Discovered a previously unknown layer lurking in the human eye named the "dua's layer".
- Jagbir Jhutti Johal – Professor of religion, author and media commentator
- Jagjit Chadha – Professor and Chair in Money and Banking in the Department of Economics at the University of Kent
- Kalwant Bhopal – Professor of Education and Social Justice and Deputy Director of the Centre for Research in Race & Education at the University of Birmingham
- Opinderjit Takhar – Researcher within Sikh Studies and Director of the Centre for Sikh and Panjabi Studies at the University of Wolverhampton.
- Simon Singh – Mathematician and author
- Sukhpal Singh Gill – Indian born UK academic and Assistant Professor of Computer Science at the Queen Mary University of London, UK.
- Sukhbir Singh Kapoor – Vice Chancellor of The International School of Sikh Studies and Khalsa College London
- Tejinder Virdee – Experimental particle physicist and Professor of Physics at Imperial College London
- Yadvinder Malhi – Professor of Ecosystem Science at the University of Oxford and a Jackson Senior Research Fellow at Oriel College, Oxford.

== Business and the professions ==
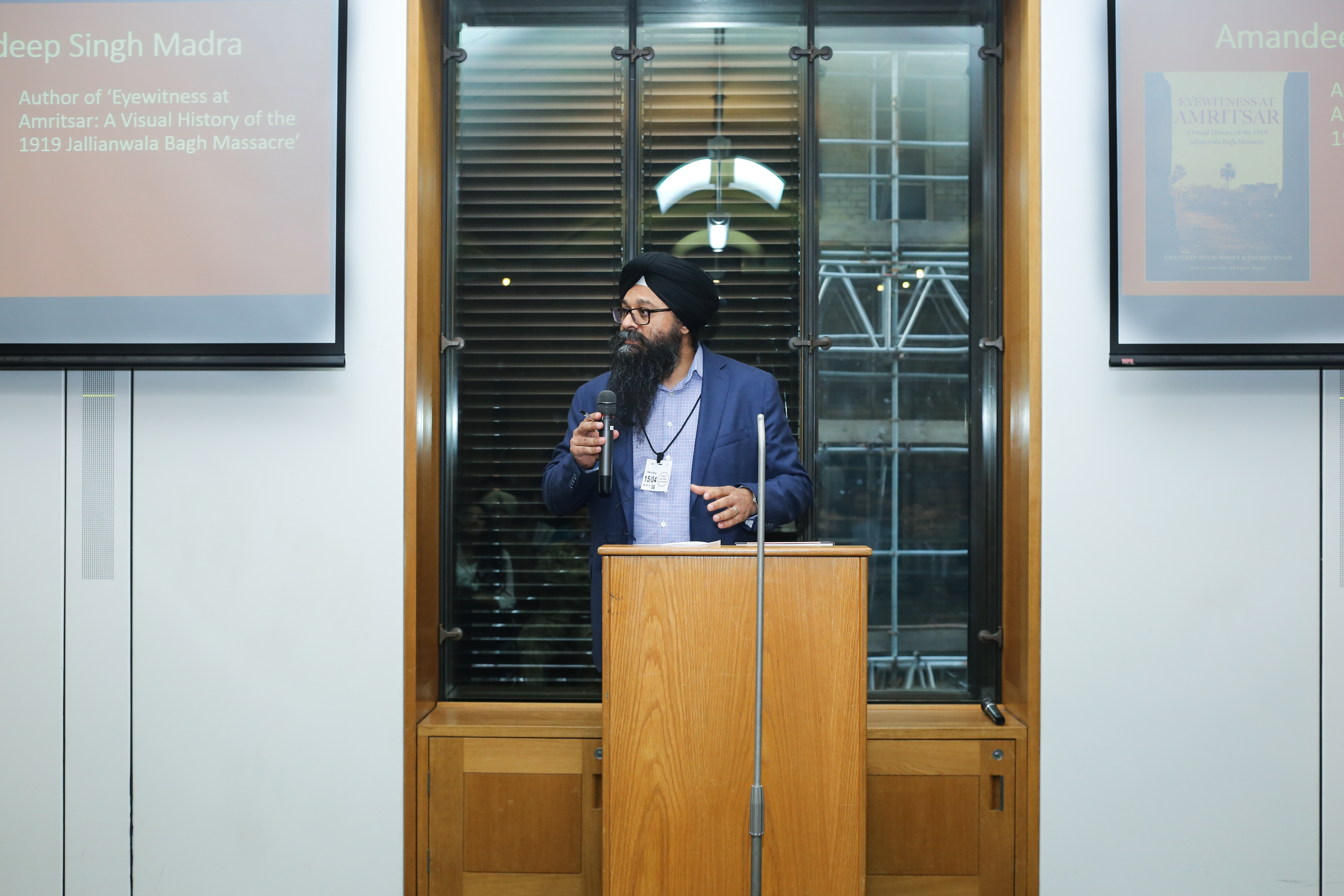
Amandeep Madra chairman of UKPHA speaking at the 100th anniversary of the Jalianwala Bagh massacre in the UK Parliament

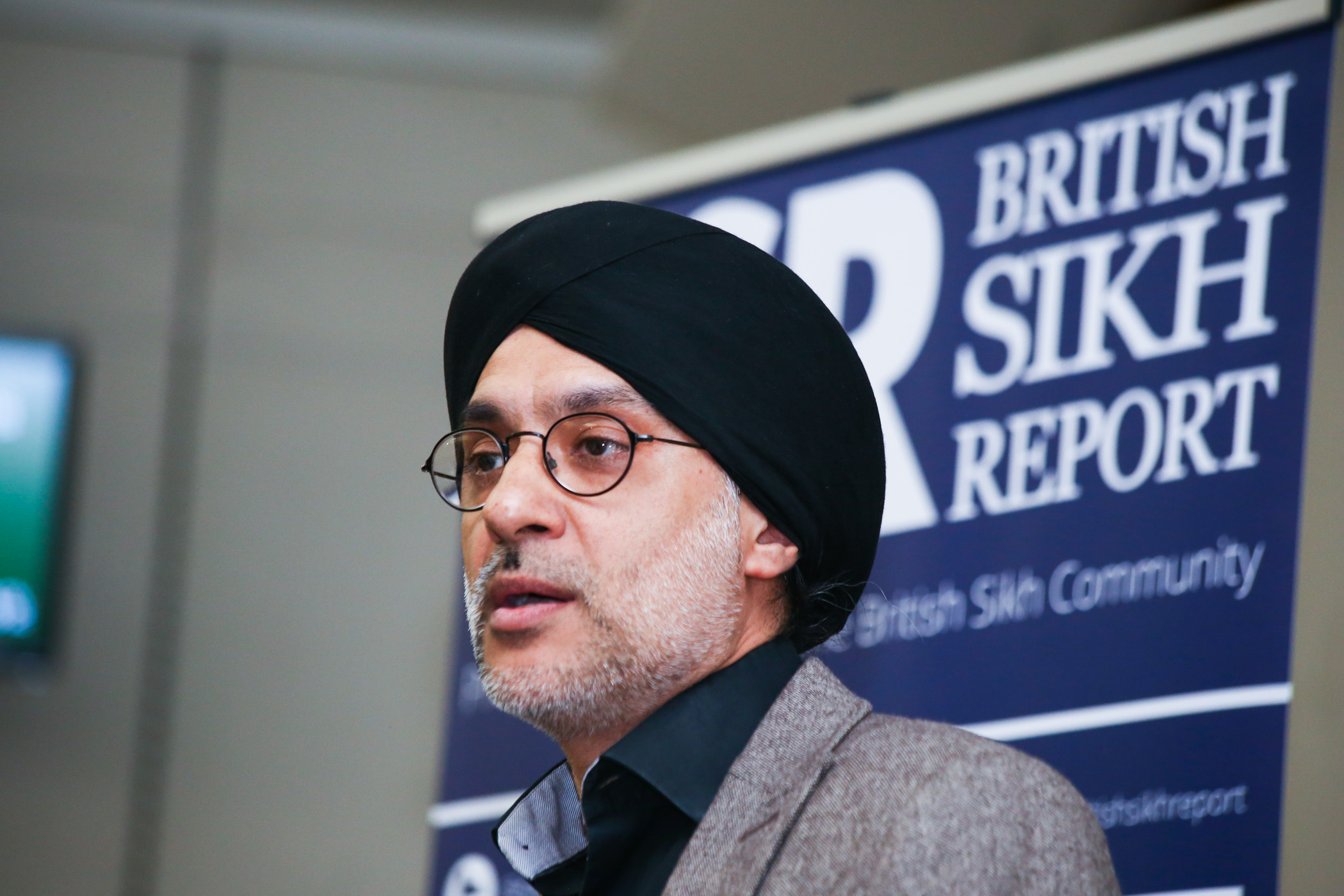
Jaz Rai chairman of the Sikh Recovery Network speaking in the UK Parliament

- Tony Lit – Managing Director of Sunrise Radio
- Dabinderjit Singh – Director at the National Audit Office
- Harpal Kumar – Chief executive of Cancer Research UK
- Jasminder Singh – Chairman of the Radisson Edwardian hotel empire.
- Jaz Rai – Aerospace engineer and chairman of the Sikh Recovery Network
- Kamel Hothi – Former banker at Lloyds Bank
- Karamjit Singh – Chair of the University Hospitals of Leicester NHS Trust
- Kulveer Ranger – Management Consultant. Former London Transport Minister and Mayor's Director of Environment and Digital London
- Manjeet Singh Riyat – Emergency Care Consultant at University Hospitals of Derby and Burton NHS Foundation Trust
- Param Singh – Technology and business professional
- Ranjit Singh Boparan – Founder and owner of 2 Sisters Food Group
- Reena Ranger – Director at Sun Mark and founder of Women Empowered Network
- Reuben Singh – CEO of contact centre
- Tom Singh – Founder of the high street fashion chain New Look.

== Charity, community and non-profit ==
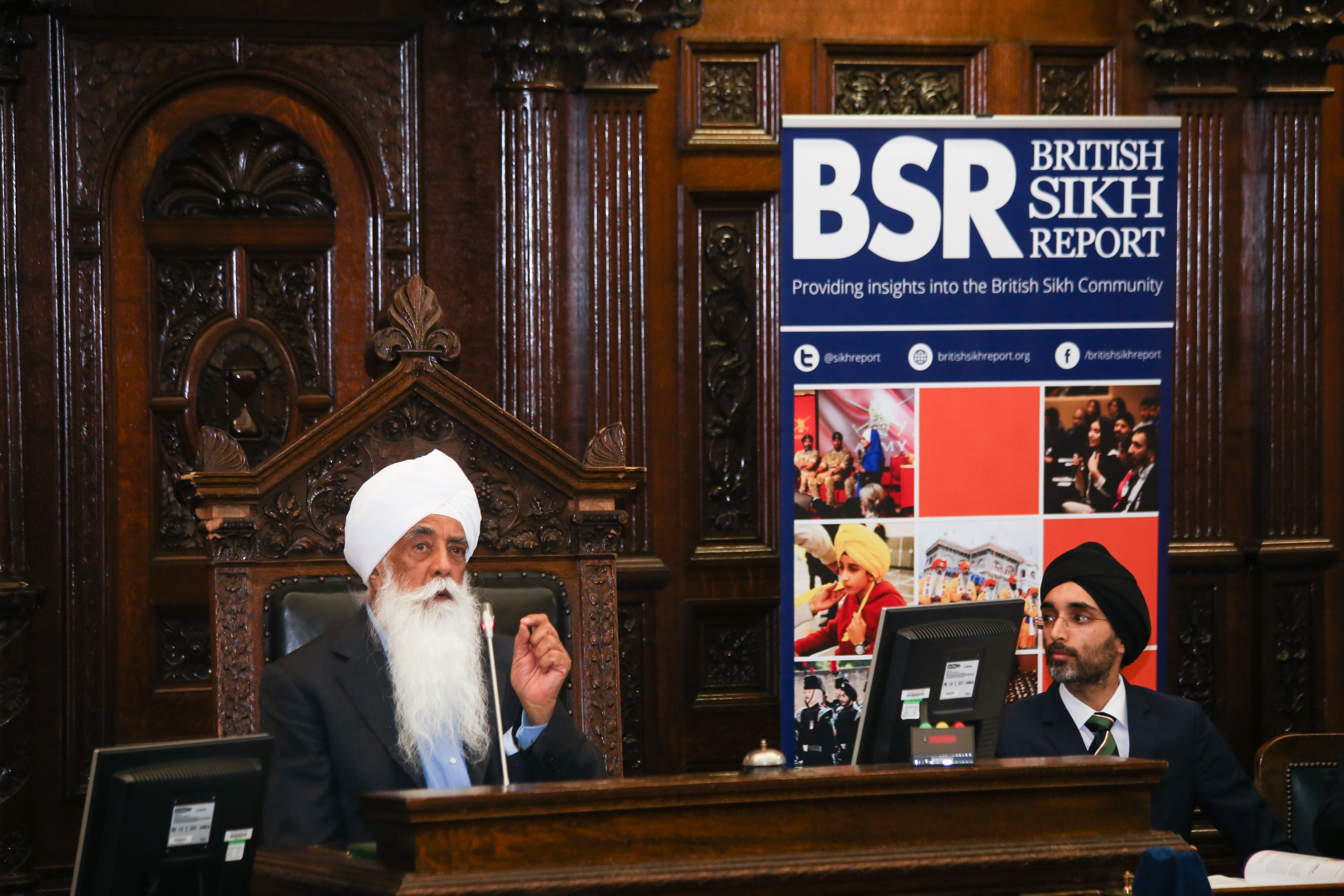
Bhai Sahib Bhai Mohinder Singh Ahluwalia speaking at the Midlands launch of the British Sikh Report 2018

- Amandeep Madra – Founder and chairman of the UK Punjab Heritage Association
- Balwant Kaur – Founder and chairperson of Mata Nanki Foundation
- Daljit Singh Shergill – President of Guru Nanak Gurdwara Smethwick
- Imandeep Kaur – Director of Impact Hub: Birmingham
- Jagraj Singh - Founder of Basics of Sikhi
- Mohinder Singh Ahluwalia – Chairman of the Nishkam Group
- Nidar Singh Nihang – Scholar and Grandmaster of Shastar Vidya
- Rajinder Singh Dhatt – World War II veteran and community leader
- Ravi Singh – CEO Khalsa Aid

== Film, drama and entertainment ==
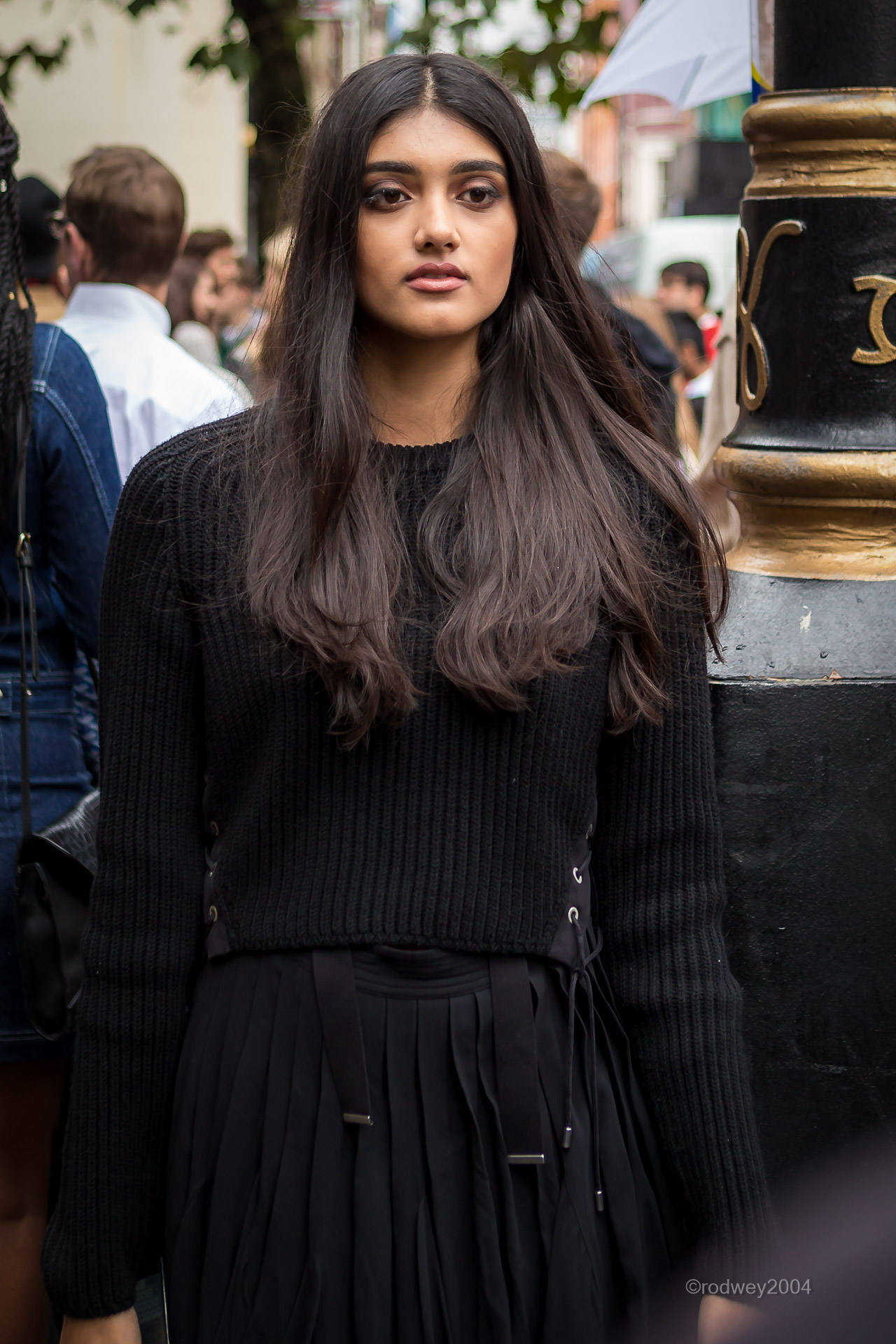
British fashion model Neelam Gill at London Fashion Week

- Ameet Chana – Actor
- Amrit Maghera – Professional model turned actress
- Chandeep Uppal – Critically acclaimed starring role as Meena Kumar in the film Anita and Me.
- Gurinder Chadha – Film director
- Harnaam Kaur – Model, anti-bullying activist, body positive activist
- Kulvinder Ghir – Actor, comedian and writer
- Jassa Ahluwalia – Actor and presenter
- Lena Kaur – Best known for her role as Leila Roy in Channel 4's Hollyoaks
- Mandip Gill – Actress
- Mandy Takhar – Actress
- Neelam Gill – Model, known for her work with Burberry, Abercrombie & Fitch and appearing in Vogue.
- Paul Chowdhry – Comedian and actor
- Parminder Nagra – Actress born in Leicester
- Perry Bhandal – Film director, screenwriter
- Simon Rivers – English actor who played the role of Kevin Tyler in Doctors
- Stephen Uppal – Known for playing Ravi Roy in the long-running British soap Hollyoaks
- Vikkstar123 – English YouTuber, Internet personality, DJ and music producer.

== Law and justice ==
Jo Sidhu QC a leading criminal law barrister speaking in the UK Parliament|alt=]]

- Alamjeet Kaur Chauhan – Lawyer and Femina Miss India winner 1978
- Anup Singh Choudry – Retired High Court Judge
- Jasvir Singh – Family Law Barrister, co-founder of South Asian Heritage Month, interfaith activist and main Sikh contributor to BBC Radio 4's Thought for the Day
- Jo Sidhu – Criminal Law Barrister
- Mota Singh – Retired Circuit judge England
- Lord Justice Singh - Rabinder Singh – First Sikh Judge of the UK High court Court of Appeal judge, formerly a High Court judge of the Queen's Bench Division

== Journalism, writers and media ==
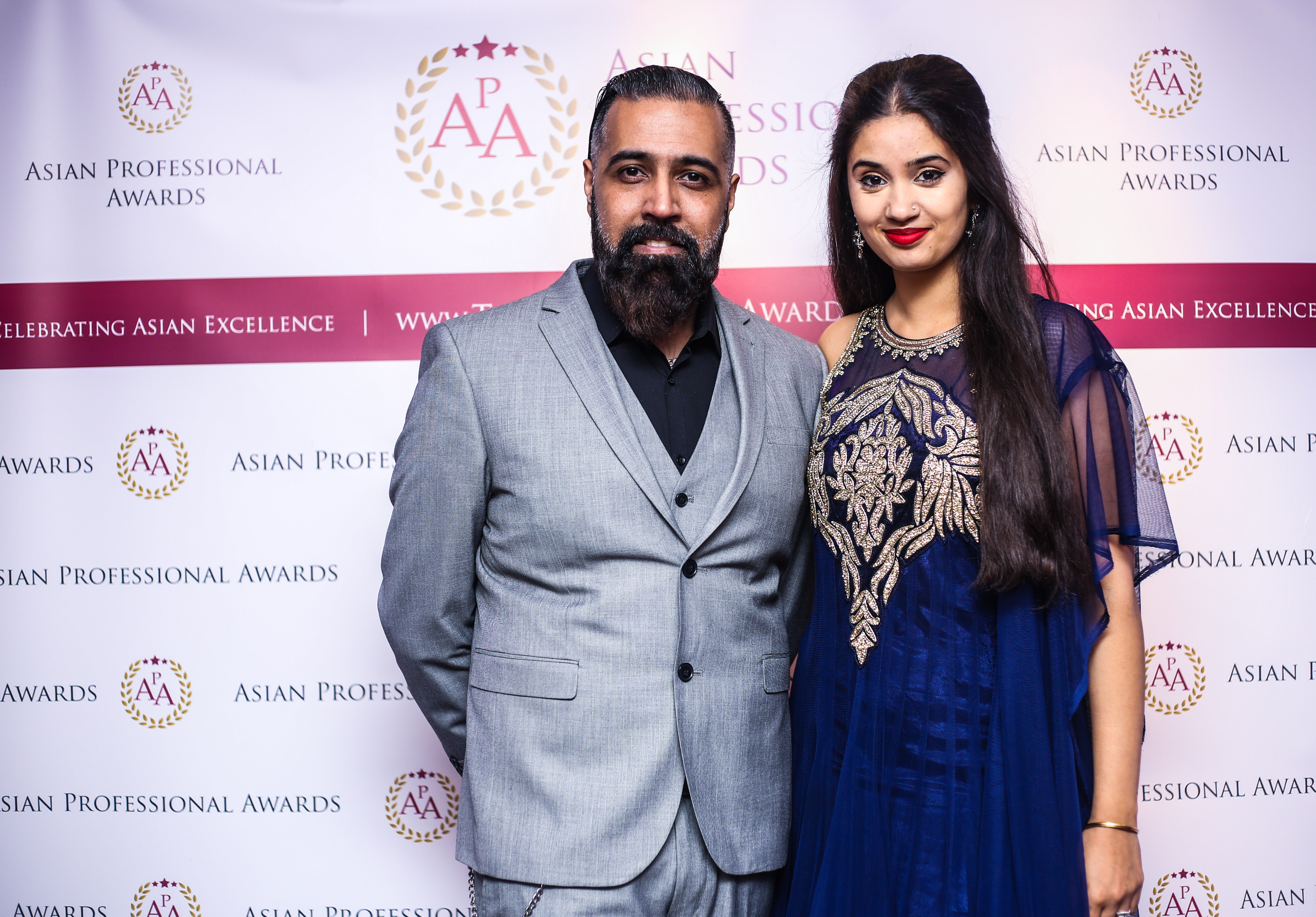
Sunny and Shay attending a gala Awards ceremony in London

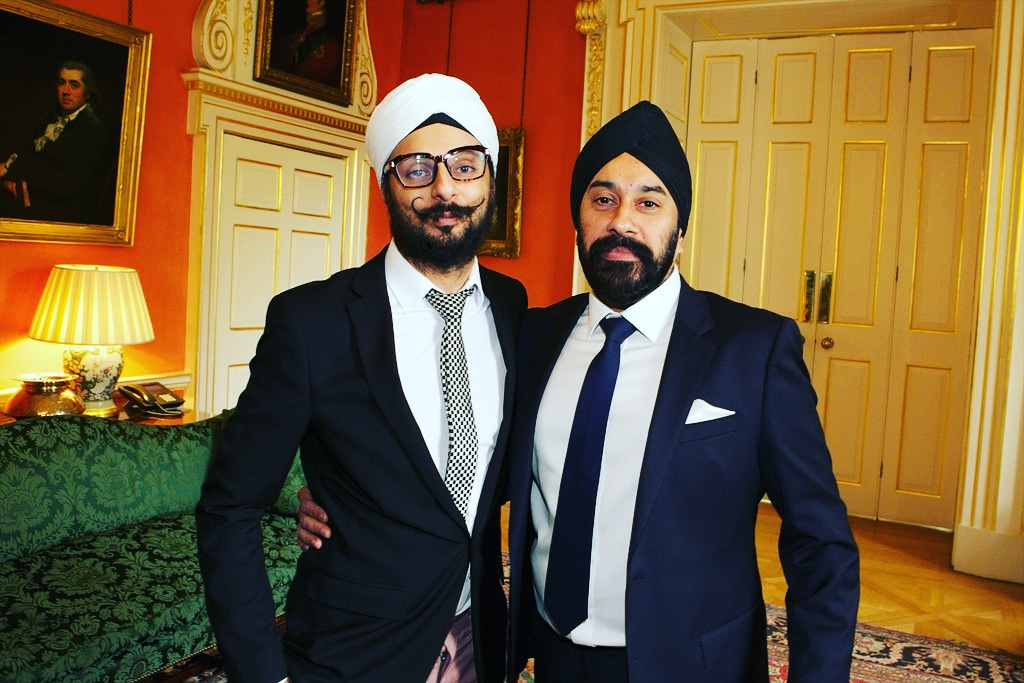
Peter Bance – historian and author of 'Sikhs in Britain' with technology professional Param Singh at Number 10 Downing Street

- Anita Rani – Radio and television presenter
- Bali Rai – English author of children's and young adult fiction
- Bobby Friction – DJ, television presenter and radio presenter
- Daljit Nagra – Poet
- Gurpreet Kaur Bhatti – Writer
- Hardeep Singh Kohli – Radio and television presenter
- Max Arthur Macauliffe (1841–1913) – Senior administrator of the British Raj who was posted in the Punjab; prolific scholar and author.
- Nirpal Singh Dhaliwal – Journalist and writer
- Peter Bance – Historian, author and Maharaja Duleep Singh archivist
- Priya Kaur-Jones – Newsreader
- Raman Mundair – Poet, writer, artist and playwright
- Ranvir Singh – English television presenter and journalist
- Sathnam Sanghera – British journalist and author
- Sonia Deol – English radio and television presenter
- Sunny Hundal – Journalist and blogger
- Sunny and Shay – Husband and wife radio presenters
- The Singh Twins – artists Amrit and Rabindra Kaur Singh

== Music ==
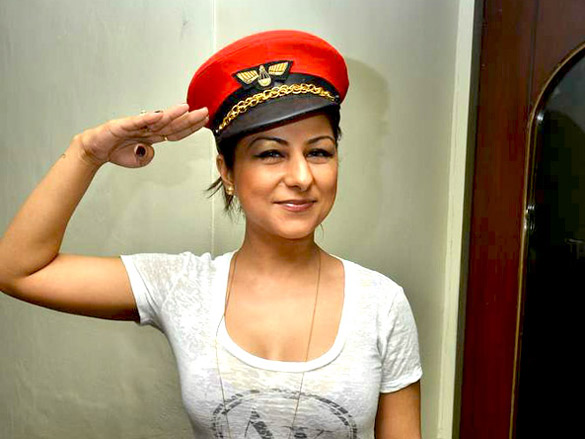
Hard Kaur at a Sony music album launch

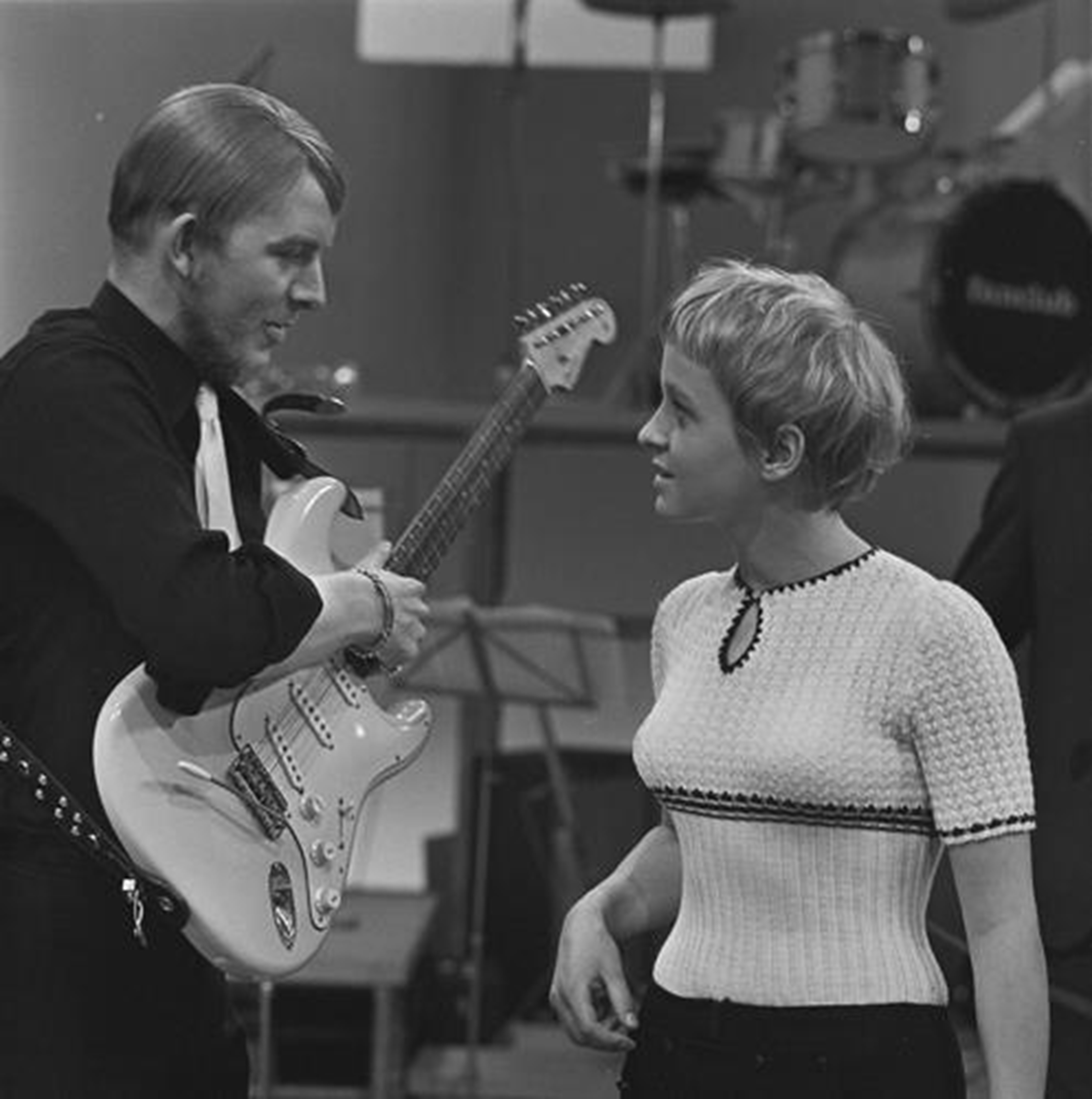
Sikh convert Vic Briggs with guitar (Dutch TV, 1967)

- Aman Hayer – Bhangra producer and singer
- Bally Sagoo – Record producer
- Channi Singh – British-Indian bhangra musician, known as the "godfather" of bhangra in the West.
- Diamond Duggal – Music producer, DJ, songwriter and guitarist
- Dr Zeus – Punjabi singer and music producer
- Gurdeep Samra – Music producer and DJ
- Hard Kaur – Rapper and hip hop singer
- Indy Sagu – Bhangra and hip hop musician
- Jas Mann – Songwriter, musician, singer, record producer and film producer
- Jassi Sidhu – Bhangra singer and the former lead singer of British Indian bhangra band B21
- Jay Sean – R&B Artist
- Juggy D – Bhangra, Punjabi, R&B
- Malkit Singh – Punjabi bhangra singer
- Manj Musik – Music composer, singer
- Manni Sandhu – Music director
- Panjabi MC – Rapper, musician and DJ
- Rishi Rich – Music producer
- Sardara Gill – Punjabi Bhangra singer, lead singer of Apna Sangeet
- Steel Banglez – Record producer
- Silinder Pardesi – Bhangra singer-songwriter, lyricist, and composer
- Surinder Singh Matharu – Founder of the Raj Academy Conservatoire
- Sukshinder Shinda – Bhangra Record producer and singer–songwriter
- Surjit Khan – Record producer, musician and singer-songwriter
- Tarsame Singh Saini – Singer, composer and actor
- Talvin Singh – Producer, composer and tabla player
- Tigerstyle – Folkhop group
- Tjinder Singh – Lead singer of British indie rock band Cornershop
- Tru Skool – Music artist
- Vic Briggs – Former blues and rock musician

== Politics ==
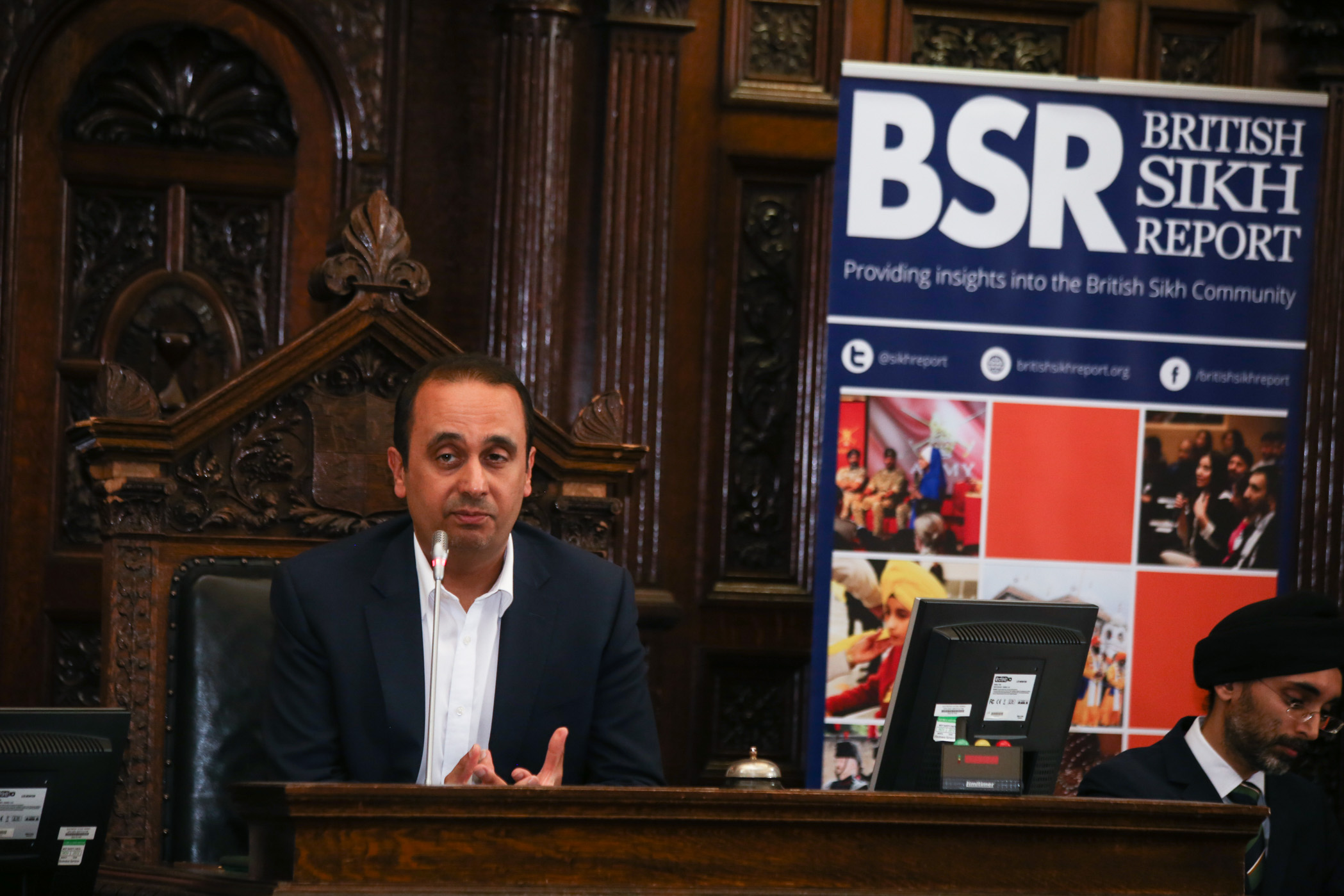
Paul Uppal the small business commissioner speaking at a Sikh community event in the Midlands

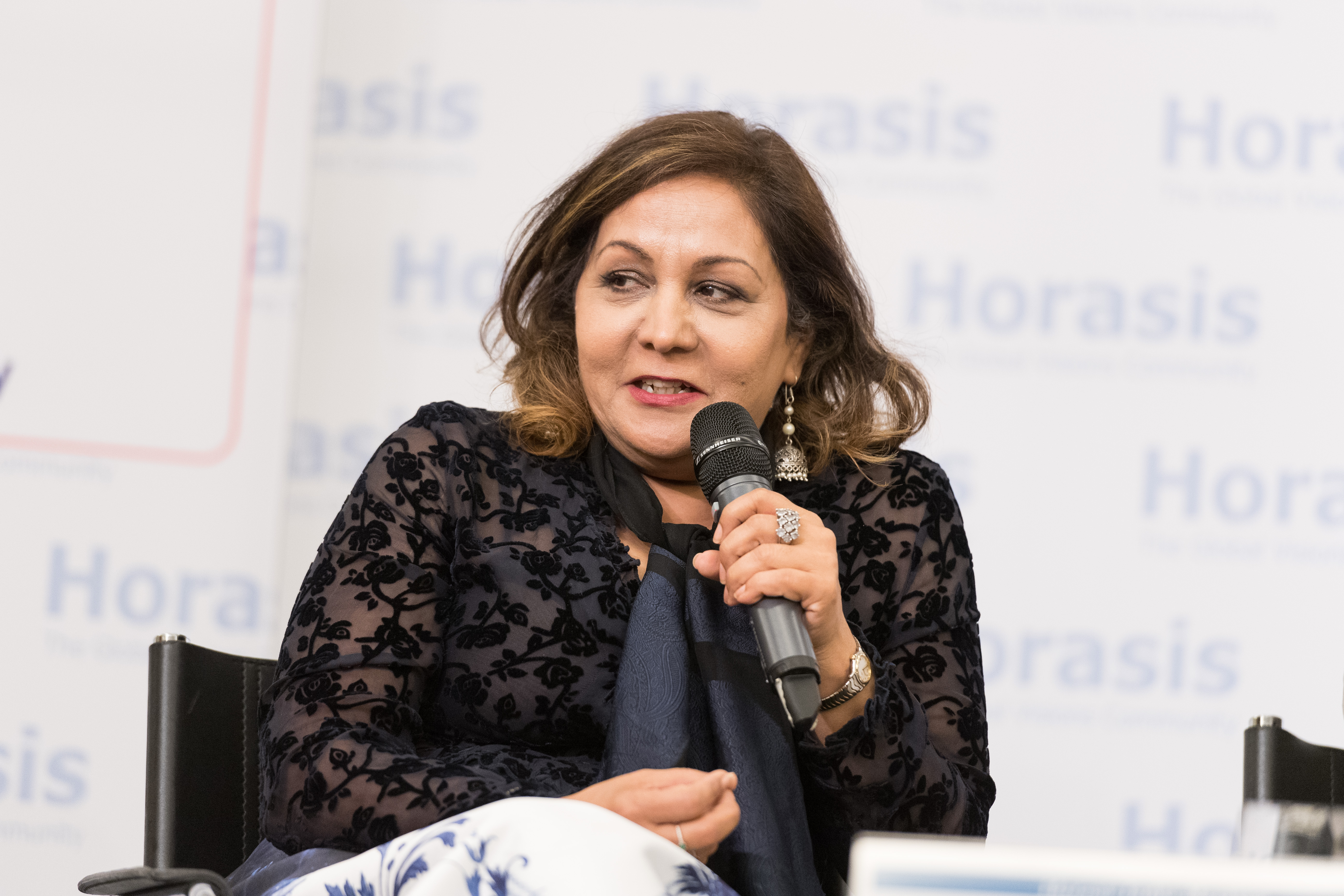
Neena Gill was a Member of the European Parliament (MEP) for the West Midlands

- Atma Singh – Policy Advisor to the Mayor of London on Asian Affairs in the Greater London Authority, under Mayor of London Ken Livingstone
- Gurinder Josan – Labour party activist
- Hardyal Dhindsa – Councillor
- Indarjit Singh – Member House of Lords
- Jas Athwal – Leader of Redbridge London Borough Council, Labour Party Politician
- Marsha Singh – British Labour Party politician, and the Member of Parliament (MP) for Bradford West from 1997 to 2012
- Neena Gill – Member of the European Parliament for the West Midlands
- Onkar Sahota – Member of the London Assembly for Ealing and Hillingdon
- Pam Gosal – Member of the Scottish Parliament for West Scotland
- Parmjit Dhanda – British Labour Party politician who was the Member of Parliament (MP) for Gloucester from 2001 until the 2010 general election
- Parmjit Singh Gill – Member of Parliament for Leicester South from July 2004 to May 2005, he was the first ethnic-minority Liberal Democrat MP
- Paul Uppal – Former Conservative Member of Parliament and Small business commissioner
- Piara Khabra – Labour Member of Parliament (MP) for Ealing Southall from 1992 until his death
- Preet Gill – Member of Parliament (MP) for Birmingham Edgbaston since the 2017 general election. She is the first female British Sikh MP.
- Ranbir Singh Suri, Baron Suri – Member House of Lords
- Sonika Nirwal – Senior Ealing Southall constituency Labour politician representing the Greenford Broadway ward
- Tanmanjeet Singh Dhesi – British Labour Party politician. Member of Parliament (MP) for Slough since 2017
- Satvir Kaur – Leader of Southampton City Council, Labour Party Politician
- Chaman Lal - First British Indian Lord Mayor of Europe's largest council, Birmingham City Council.
- Ram Parkash Lakha - Former Lord Mayor of Coventry.
- Bishan Dass - Elected as first British Asian Lord Mayor of Wolverhampton in 1986.

== Royalty ==
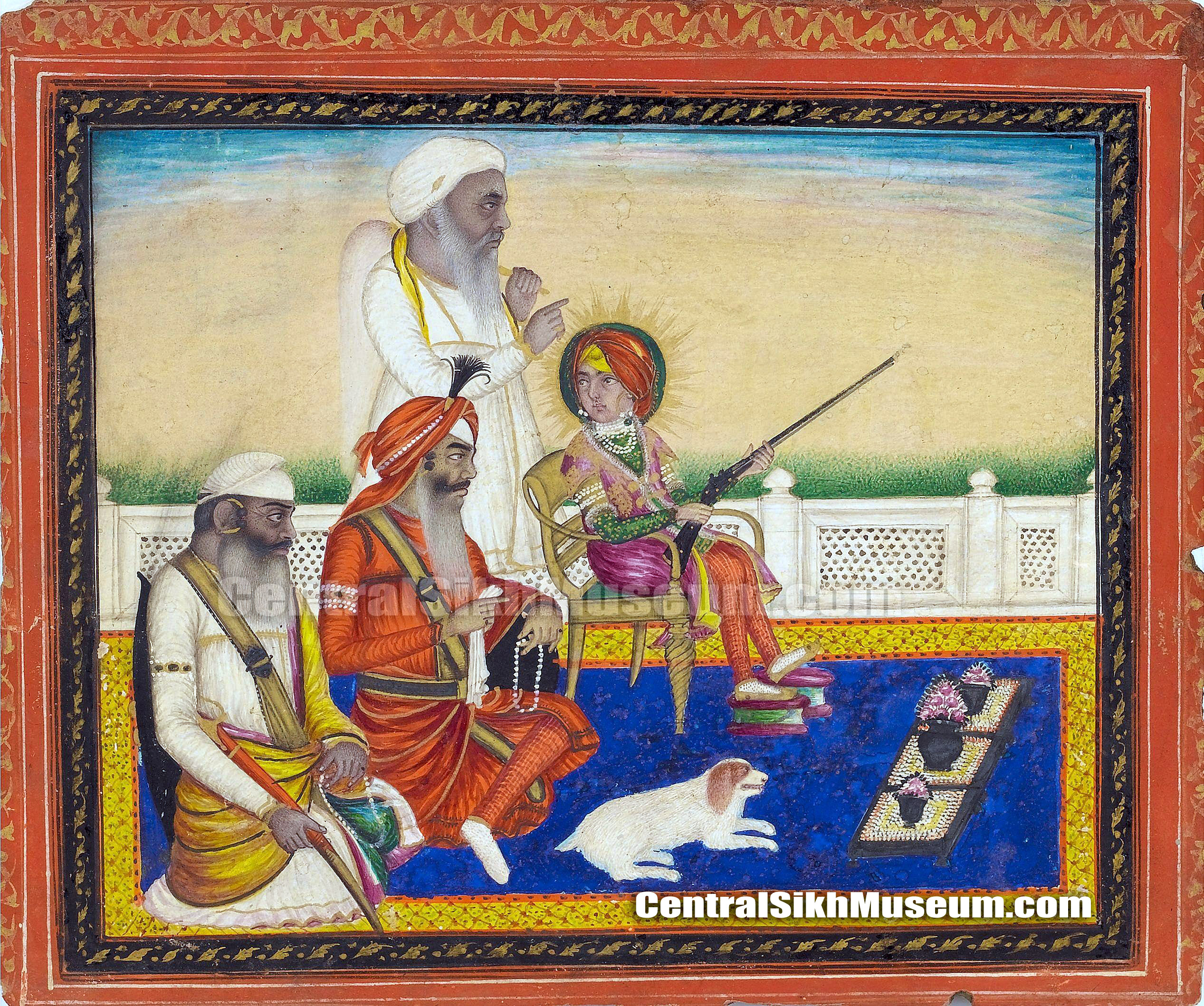
Maharaja Duleep Singh in durbar on a terrace with Labh Singh and Tej Singh and an attendant Lahore, circa 1850

- Maharaja Duleep Singh – Last Maharaja of the Sikh Kingdom, exiled in 1849 during the British Raj.
- Maharani Sahiba Ushira Singh Kapoor

== Sports ==
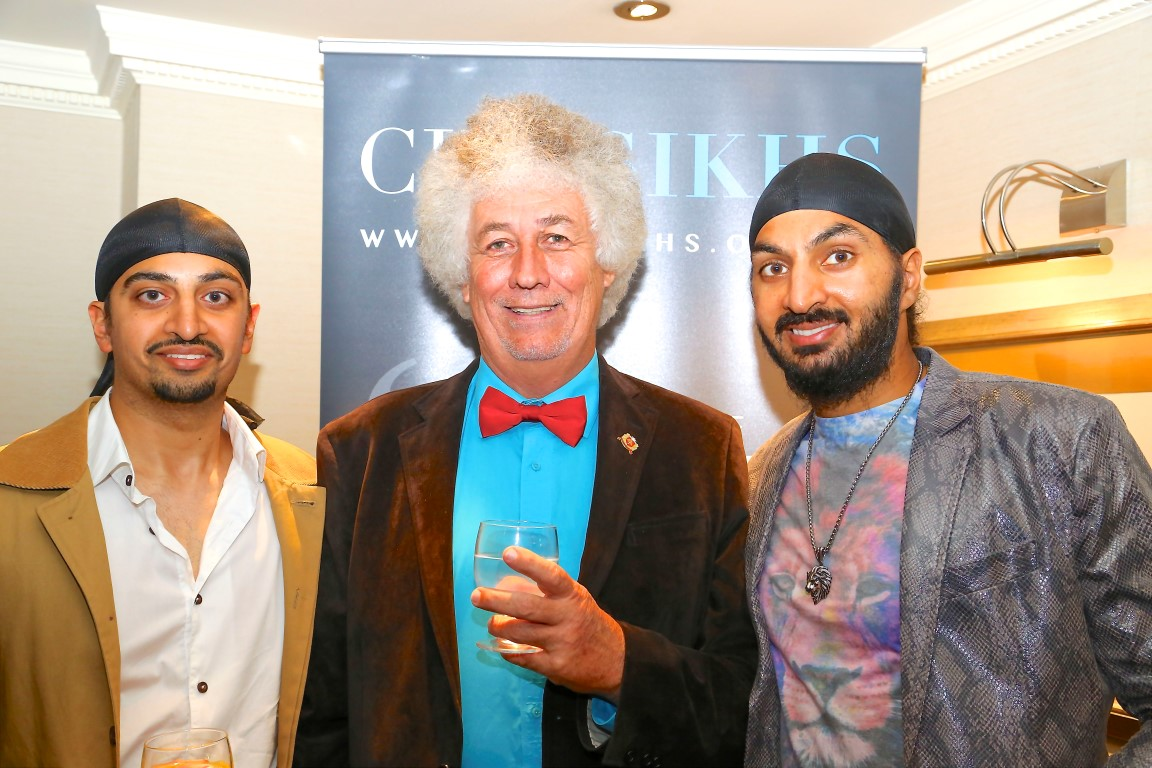
The Cricketer Monty Panesar and his brother at a Sikh Professional Networking event in London

- Karenjeet Kaur Bains – Powerlifter and gladiator
- Aman Dosanj – First British Asian footballer to represent England
- Arjan Raikhy – Footballer for Aston Villa
- Brandon Khela – Footballer for Birmingham City F.C
- Danny Batth – Footballer and Captain of Wolverhampton Wanderers F.C.
- Fauja Singh – British Sikh centenarian marathon runner
- Harpal Singh – Footballer
- Kash Gill – Former kickboxing world champion
- Monty Panesar – England cricketer
- Raj Hundal – English Snooker player
- Ravi Bopara – English cricketer
- Skipping Sikh – British-Indian septuagenarian health and fitness personality

== Causes célèbres ==
- Jagtar Singh Johal – Scottish Sikh man who has been unlawfully detained in India since 2017.
- Lakhvir Kaur Singh – British Sikh woman, known as the "Curry Killer" due to the food to which the poison was added.

== See also ==
- List of Canadian Sikhs
- List of Sikhs
- Sikhism in England
- Sikhism in the United Kingdom
