= Rajinder Singh =

Rajinder Singh may refer to:

- Maharaja Rajinder Singh of Patiala (1872–1900)
- Rajinder Singh (brigadier) (1899–1947), Maha Vir Chakra recipient, Jammu and Kashmir State Forces
- Rajinder Singh (cricketer) (born 1960), Indian cricketer
- Rajinder Singh (Skipping Sikh), British Indian health and fitness personality
- Rajinder Singh (spiritual master) (born 1946), Indian spiritual teacher
- Rajinder Singh (wrestler) (born 1954), Indian former wrestler
- Rajinder Singh Sr. (born 1958), Indian field hockey player and coach
- Rajinder Singh Jr. (born 1959), Indian field hockey player
- Rajinder Singh (field hockey, born 2002), Indian player who made his debut in 2024

== See also ==
- Rajendra Singh (disambiguation)
- Rajinder Singh Bedi (1915–1984), Indian writer, screenwriter
- Rajinder Singh Rahelu (born 1973), Indian Paralympic powerlifter
- Rajinder Singh Rai, British musician professionally known as Panjabi MC
- Rajinder Singh Rana (born 1966), Indian politician
- Rajinder Singh Rawat (born 1940), Indian hockey player
- Rajinder Singh Sandhu (born 1945), Ugandan hockey player
- Rajinder Singh Sarkaria (1916–2007), Indian Supreme Court justice
- Rajinder Singh Sparrow (1911–1994), Maha Vir Chakra recipient, Indian Army
