= List of The Family (2008 TV series) episodes =

The following is a list of episodes for the British fly-on-the-wall documentary series, The Family. The series is a revival of the original series of the same name that first aired in 1974.

As of December 22, 2010, 24 episodes of The Family have aired.

== Series overview ==
Series	Episodes	Originally released	
Series	Episodes	First released	Last released
1	8	17 September 2008	5 November 2008
Christmas Special		24 December 2008	
2	8	4 November 2009	23 December 2009
3	7	16 November 2010	22 December 2010

== Episodes ==
=== Series 1: The Hughes (2008) ===
Series 1 followed the lives of the Hughes family consisting of parents Simon and Jane, and their four children – Jessica (22), Emily (19), Charlotte (17), and Tom (14) who live in Harbledown, Canterbury, Kent. They had more than 20 cameras placed in their semi-detached home, capturing their every move over a period of four months and were controlled from the house next door.

No. overall	No. in season	Title	Original release date	Viewers (millions)
1	1	"Life Begins at 40"	17 September 2008	2.7
As Jane's 40th birthday approaches the tension is building in the Hughes household. Nineteen-year-old Emily is frequently out partying and her nocturnal lifestyle threatens to overshadow the happy family celebration.
2	2	"Secrets"	24 September 2008	2.2
Two of the Hughes children have been keeping secrets from their mum and dad and it's only a matter of time before the cat is out of the bag and both girls are in trouble.
3	3	"Bedtime"	1 October 2008	1.5
Simon and Jane go out for the evening and leave Emily in charge. When 14-year-old Tom won't go to bed on time, a fight breaks out between brother and sister.
4	4	"The St. Valentine's Day Massacre"	8 October 2008	2.0
Feeling unsupported in his attempts to discipline the children, Simon starts to lash out at everyone – not an ideal preparation for a romantic evening.
5	5	"Teenage Kicks"	15 October 2008	1.7
The portrait of family life continues with mum Jane and dad Simon locked in a battle of wills with headstrong daughter Emily.
6	6	"Rules"	22 October 2008	2.0
Emily pushes Jane to the limit this time, Jane decides she's had enough with her daughter's rude remarks.
7	7	"The Pierced Ear"	29 October 2008	1.8
Tom reveals that he has had his ear pierced, but by who? Tom shows his sisters who cannot help but laugh, when Jane arrives home from work and Tom reveals the earring to her, she is not pleased.
8	8	"Wedding Vows"	5 November 2008	2.2
The intimate portrait of family life concludes with the wedding of eldest daughter Jessica.
9	9	"The Family Christmas Special: The Family at Christmas"	24 December 2008	1.36
Christmas time at the Hughes household.

=== Series 2: The Grewals (2009) ===
Series 2 followed the lives of the Grewals, a British Indian family consisting of parents Arvinderjeet and Sarbjit, and their three children – Mandeep (33), Gurdip (32), and Tejind (23) along with Mandeep and Gurdip's spouses – Gursharonjit (24) and Jitender (36), respectively, who live in West London. The format differed slightly from the first series in that micro-interviews with family members were interspersed periodically throughout the programme, commenting about the issue in the episode.

No. overall	No. in season	Title	Original release date
10	1	"Cup of Tea"	4 November 2009
Eldest son Sunny and Shay's Indian wedding is fast approaching. Their experience is very different to that of parents Arvinder and Sarbjit, who had an arranged marriage 35 years ago and met for the first time on their wedding day. However, the occasion is overshadowed by Shay's difficult relationship with her mother. Is Shay's dream of reconciliation possible?
11	2	"Chicken and Vodka Every Day"	11 November 2009
For Jeet, playing house-husband is a far cry from the film star days he has left behind in India. Meanwhile, pregnant Kaki is feeling hormonal and unhappy as her due date draws closer.The tensions are taking their toll on their relationship, and with the pressure mounting, Jeet announces he might go back to India: with or without Kaki.
12	3	"You're The One"	18 November 2009
With no one to give her away on the big day, Shay is left questioning if blood really does run thicker than water. For the past five years Sarbjit has always been by Shay's side to help pick up the pieces. So far Shay's attempts at reaching out to her family have left her broken-hearted. Do you need to lose one family to gain another or will a phone call from her aunt change everything?
13	4	"Daddy Likes His Potatoes"	25 November 2009
Until now he has maintained a silence on girlfriends and sex but, with his mum and dad looking for a bride for the 'baby' of the house, Tejind comes clean on a night out. The family also gear up for Fathers' Day, but for Shay and Sarbjit this also brings tears as they remember their own fathers, who are no longer alive. Without her dad, Shay hopes she might be able to make peace with her mother before the wedding and decides to call her. After five and a half years, will this phone call bring them back together?
14	5	"Little Pinchings"	2 December 2009
For Sarbjit and Arvinder having all their children under one roof is all-important, but as every parent knows, it sometimes comes at a price. With a wedding on the horizon and a baby on the way, the family is feeling the pressure. As the storm brews will news about the baby clear the air and heal the rift in the family?
15	6	"Risk It for a Biscuit"	9 December 2009
The discovery of a rat in the kitchen means Arvinder turns DIY Dad as he grapples with getting rid of the pest. He's not impressed spending his time off playing handyman, nor is Sarbjit with her 'old man' under her feet all day. But who will prevail? The rat? Or Arvinder and his DIY? Meanwhile, Kaki's baby is due in eight weeks but Jeet is off to India for a month to see his family. With news about the baby and the day of departure drawing closer, Jeet is left wondering if he is making the right decision.
16	7	"Nine Missed Calls"	16 December 2009
17	8	"Happy Days Again"	23 December 2009

=== Series 3: The Adesinas (2010) ===
Series 3 followed the lives of the Adesinas, a Nigerian British family consisting of parents Sunday and Vicky, and their four British children – Ayo (27), Julie (25), Olu (23), and Ola (15) who live in Hackney, East London.

No. overall	No. in season	Title	Original release date
18	1	"The Family"	16 November 2010
19	2	"Top of the Tree"	23 November 2010
20	3	"Single Black Male"	30 November 2010
21	4	"She's Too Western"	7 December 2010
22	5	"Freedom Is a Curse"	14 December 2010
23	6	"Life Is Not a Picnic"	21 December 2010
24	7	"Farewells"	22 December 2010
