= The Family (2011 TV series) =

- Genre: Reality Television
- Country of origin: Australia
- Original language: English
- No. of seasons: 1
- No. of episodes: 8

Production
- Executive producers: Peter Newman; Richard Campbell
- Producer: Lara Hopkins
- Production locations: Melbourne, Australia
- Editor: Nikki Stevens

Original release
- Network: SBS One
- Release: 24 November 2011 – present

Related
- The Family (1974); The Family (2008)

The Family is an Australian fly-on-the-wall documentary series that began airing 24 November 2011 on SBS One. It is the Australian version of the British series of the same name.

The first series will follow the Cardamone family—father Angelo, mother Josephine, and sons David (20), Stefan (18), and Adrian (14)--through their daily lives. They have allowed 35 remote-controlled cameras to follow their every move, day and night, for three months.

== The Families ==
=== Series 1: The Cardamones ===
Series 1 follows the lives of the Cardamone family—parents Angelo and Josephine and sons David (20), Stefan (18), and Adrian (14)--who live in the Melbourne suburb of Park Orchards.

- Angelo Cardamone works for a concrete company and is a quiet man who lets his wife Josephine run the house. When Angelo feels strongly about something, he will definitely put his foot down and is the stricter parent. Angelo describes himself as content and looks forward to seeing his boys mature and start their own lives.
- Josephine 'Josie' Cardamone runs a very efficient household, providing a home for her husband and three boys. The large amount of cooking, cleaning and caring doesn't get her down. Josephine, while keeping up with her duties of running the house, is also a part-time cosmetics salesperson in Myer, which adds to her load. Josephine looks forward to having daughters-in-law and hopes to make a great mother-in-law one day.
- David Cardamone (20) is Angelo and Josephine's eldest son. He studies architecture and works part-time. He also plays football and has a steady girlfriend, Jess. He fights with his brothers when he feels they do not pull their own weight. David's biggest frustration is that he and Jess aren't allowed to share a bedroom when she stays over.
- Stefan Cardamone (18) is Angelo and Josephine's middle son. He tends to not feel the pressure of expectation that his older brother David does, and he escapes the attention that younger brother Adrian gets. He is very creative and loves '80s music. Stefan also plays the guitar and likes football and is the most laid-back of the 3 boys. He's in Year 12 and has a big decision to make about his future and whether he will attend university, take on a trade, or take a year off to travel.
- Adrian Cardamone (14) is Angelo and Josephine's youngest son. The most self-confident of the boys, he likes to act as the family commentator. He doesn't like arguments and usually retreats to the piano when he's angry. Adrian has a very open relationship with his father Angelo and is quite thoughtful. He also likes to have friends over and is hoping to find a girlfriend soon.

== Episodes ==
No.	Title	Original release date
1	"Married with Children"	24 November 2011
Angelo and Josephine Cardamone, after 25 years of marriage, have learnt to negotiate most things. But when their youngest son, Adrian, wants a trail bike for his birthday they just simply can’t agree. Dad Angelo is totally against it, while Mum Josephine thinks it’s a great idea. Like all couples, they try to find some common ground.
2	"Let's Talk About Sex"	1 December 2011
The three sons of the house have sex on the brain. David is frustrated that he can’t sleep with his girlfriend at home, Stefan is beginning a new romance, and Adrian is looking at girlie magazines. Talking about sex with growing young men is difficult for most parents, but with three boys the Cardamone parents have triple the trouble.
3	"Happy Birthday to You"	8 December 2011
Stress, secrets and celebrations … Mum's 50th birthday is fast approaching and Dad and the boys haven’t planned anything. They all get together to discuss a secret strategy.
4	"They're Not Kids Anymore"	15 December 2011
For 20 years Josephine and Angelo have been looking after their three boys. But now the boys are all away. Stefan finishes year 12 and takes off to "schoolies", Adrian is heading away on a school camp and David is busy at work and with his girlfriend. It’s a new experience for Josephine and Angelo to have a quiet home.
5	"And So This Is Christmas"	22 December 2011
Another year over for the Cardamones and a massive Christmas day to organise. As usual, the family is cooking, cleaning and entertaining, and as usual most of the work falls to Josephine. For an Italian family this is a very important day - family and friends come together to celebrate.
6	"A House Full of Boys"	29 December 2011
Josie is not-too-happy with her lot. She is bored at work and feels like a slave at home and Angelo and the boys don’t seem to notice. After years of caring for the family, Josie needs to put herself first.
7	"DIY Dad"	5 January 2012
After months of planning, Angelo decides to install a water tank in the garden. But DIY does not come naturally, so the whole family is called on to assist. The boys do their bit, and share plenty of opinions along the way while Angelo tries to convince everyone he has it under control.
8	"What Are You Going to Do?" "What Are You Going to Do with Your Life?"	12 January 2012
It’s crunch time for Stefan with year 12 results and university offers on the way, but he doesn’t seem to care. He plans to take a year off and enjoy himself, but Josie and Angelo are dead set against the idea.
