= The Family (2008 TV series) =

- Genre: Reality Television
- Directed by: Jonathan Smith; Olly Lambert
- Composer: Matthew Cracknell
- Country of origin: United Kingdom
- Original language: English
- No. of series: 3
- No. of episodes: 24 (list of episodes)

Production
- Production locations: Canterbury, Kent (series 1); West London (series 2); Hackney, East London (series 3)

Original release
- Network: Channel 4
- Release: 17 September 2008 – 22 December 2010

Related
- The Family (1974); The Family (2011)

The Family is a British fly-on-the-wall documentary series that aired from 17 September 2008 to 22 December 2010 on Channel 4. Each series follows a chosen family, consisting of parents and their children. The project aim was to gain a picture of everyday family life in the United Kingdom, as film-maker and director Jonathan Smith attempted to "condense four months of ordinary family life into eight films". The series is a revival of the original series of the same name that first aired in 1974.

== The Families ==
=== Series 1: The Hughes ===
Series 1 followed the lives of the Hughes family consisting of parents Simon and Jane, and their four children - Jessica (22), Emily (19), Charlotte (17), and Tom (14) who live in Cumberland Cottage, Harbledown, Canterbury, Kent. They had more than 20 cameras placed in their semi-detached home, capturing their every move over a period of four months and were controlled from the house next door.

- Simon Hughes (44) describes his role in the family as "cook, taxi, painter and decorator, encourager, the default person to ask anything, provider, giver of cuddles, and the one who has to pretend to be in charge".
- Jane Hughes (40) is a Charity worker and has been married to Simon for 22 years. She defines her responsibilities as "peacekeeper, general dogsbody and keeper of all knowledge of where people have to be and where their belongings are".
- Jessica Hughes (22) is the eldest daughter and lives nearby with her fiancé Pat and their 10-month-old daughter, Ruby. Jessica is a stay-at-home mum, but a regular visitor to the Hughes household and describes the family as "loving, loud and food obsessed". Jessica and Pat get married at the end of the first series.
- Emily Hughes (19) is the second daughter of Simon and Jane and sees herself as the headstrong, rebellious, trouble-making party animal of the clan. She works as a shop assistant.
- Charlotte Hughes (17) is still at school and was once the district shot-put champion for the under 14 girls. She describes her role as "someone to lighten the mood" and says it's never boring with a big family.
- Tom Hughes (14) is the baby of the family. He's a typical teenager whose hobbies are BMX'ing, skateboarding and reading comic books. He says his biggest role model is Batman.

The Hughes also have a black cat called Ziggy, who is frequently seen in the series. During filming he went missing for a few days, but later returned safe and well.

=== Series 2: The Grewals ===
Series 2 followed the lives of the Grewals, a British Indian family consisting of parents Arvinderjeet and Sarbjit, and their three children - Mandeep (33), Gurdip (32), and Tejind (23) along with Mandeep and Gurdip's spouses - Gursharonjit (24) and Jitender (36), respectively, who live in west London. The format differed slightly from the first series in that micro-interviews with family members were interspersed periodically throughout the programme, commenting about the issue in the episode.

- Arvinderjeet Grewal (54) is the father of the household and is married to Sarbjit.
- Sarbjit Grewal (aka Polly) (55) is the mother of the household and is married to Arvinderjeet.
- Mandeep Grewal (aka Sunny) (33) is the eldest son of Arvinderjeet and Sarbjit and is married to Shay.
- Gursharonjit Grewal (aka Shay) (24) is married to Sunny and is Arvinderjeet and Sarbjit's daughter-in-law.
- Gurdip (aka Kaki) (32) is the middle child and daughter of Arvinderjeet and Sarbjit. She is married to Jeet and gave birth to her and Jeet's second child during the Series 2.
- Jitender (aka Jeet) (36) is married to Kaki and is Arvinderjeet and Sarbjit's son-in-law.
- Tejind Grewal (aka Tindy) (23) is the youngest son of Arvinderjeet and Sarbjit.
- Bhavika (aka Wah Wahs) (2) is the granddaughter of Arvinderjeet and Sarbjit and is the first daughter of Jeet and Kaki.

The Grewals also have two dogs named Rusty and Dusty.

Since the series aired, Sunny and Shay have gone on to present a radio show on BBC London 94.9. and in 2011 began presenting the BBC Asian Network's Weekend Breakfast show.

21 March 2018 Sunny and Shay appeared on One Born Every Minute (Series 11, Episode 3)

In January 2024, Sarbjit Grewal (aka Polly) was diagnosed with lung cancer and subsequently passed away on 16 May 2026.

=== Series 3: The Adesinas ===
Series 3 followed the lives of the Adesinas, a Nigerian British family consisting of parents Sunday and Vicky, and their four British children - Ayo (27), Julie (25), Olu (23), and Ola (15) who live in Hackney, east London.

- Sunday Adesina (60) is the Nigerian born father of the Adesina household and sees himself as the provider for his family. He now runs a restaurant and take-away in east London.
- Vicky Adesina (52) is the Nigerian born mother of the Adesina household and describes her family as 'her life' and is happiest when they are all together. She currently works at the family restaurant.
- Ayo Adesina (27) is the eldest son of Sonny and Vicky. He lives at home with his parents and has started his own business as a freelance web designer. Ayo's passion is rapping and would love to release a UK rap album.
- Julie Adesina (25) is the eldest daughter of Sonny and Vicky. Julie had recently moved back home after living away for six years, which included a stint at University. Will Smith is her role model.
- Olu Adesina (23) is the youngest son of Sonny and Vicky. Olu manages one of the family's restaurants.
- Ola Adesina (15) is the youngest daughter of Sonny and Vicky. She admires American singer and actress Jennifer Hudson. Ola is scared of snakes, rats and cats.
