= Women's Studies International Forum =

Bimonthly academic journal devoted to Women's studies

- Discipline: Women's studies
- Language: English
- Edited by: Kalwant Bhopal

Publication details
- Former name(s): Women's Studies International Quarterly
- History: 1978–present
- Publisher: Elsevier
- Frequency: Bimonthly
- Impact factor: 1.736 (2021)

Standard abbreviations
- ISO 4: Women's Stud. Int. Forum

Indexing
- CODEN: WSINDA
- ISSN: 0277-5395
- LCCN: 82643383
- OCLC no.: 7590245
- Women's Studies International Quarterly
- ISSN: 0148-0685

Links
- Journal homepage; Online archive; Online archive of Women's Studies International Quarterly

Women's Studies International Forum is a bimonthly peer-reviewed academic journal covering feminist research in the area of women's studies and other disciplines. The journal is published by Elsevier and its editor-in-chief is Kalwant Bhopal (University of Birmingham).

== History ==
The journal was established in 1978 as Women's Studies International Quarterly, obtaining its current name in 1982.

== Abstracting and indexing ==
- Applied Social Sciences Index and Abstracts
- America: History and Life
- British Humanities Index
- Current Contents/Social and Behavioral Sciences
- Historical Abstracts
- PsycINFO
- Social Sciences Citation Index
- Sociological Abstracts
- Scopus

According to the Journal Citation Reports, the journal has a 2021 impact factor of 1.736.

== See also ==
- List of women's studies journals
