= Kamel Hothi =

Kamel Kaur Hothi OBE
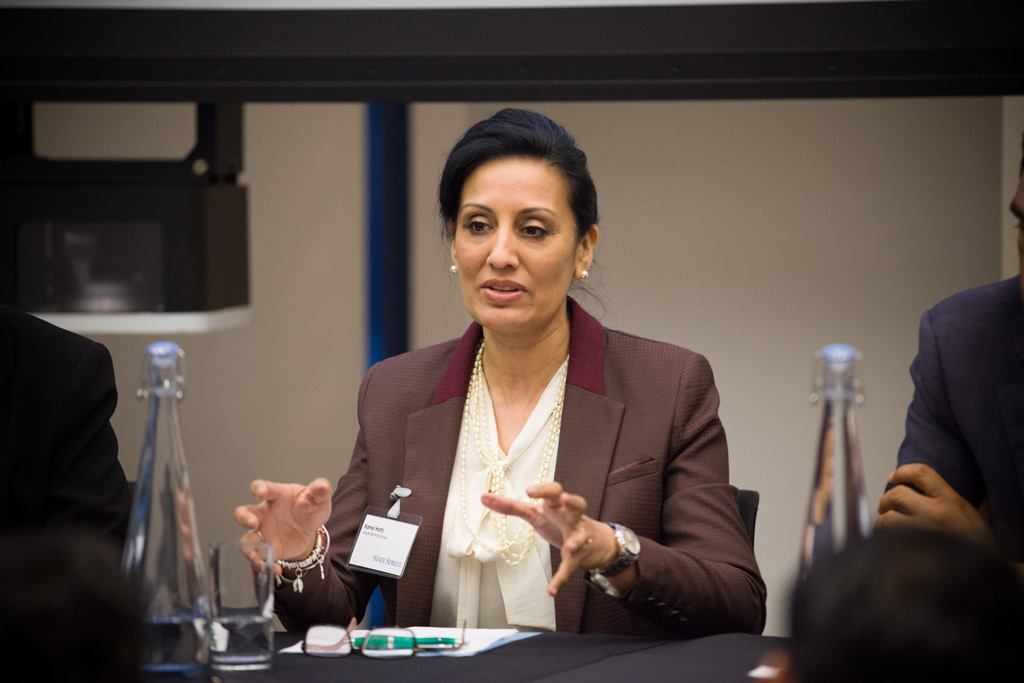
- Born: 1962 (age 63–64); London, England
- Education: World Sikh University
- Occupation: Banker
- Years active: 1979–present
- Employer: Formerly Lloyds Bank
- Known for: Adviser to several organisations
- Board member of: City Sikhs, Queen’s Commonwealth Trust
- Awards: Honorary doctorate, World Sikh University (2011)
- Honours: OBE (2017)

Kamel Hothi OBE (born 1962) is a British banker and financial adviser.

== Career ==
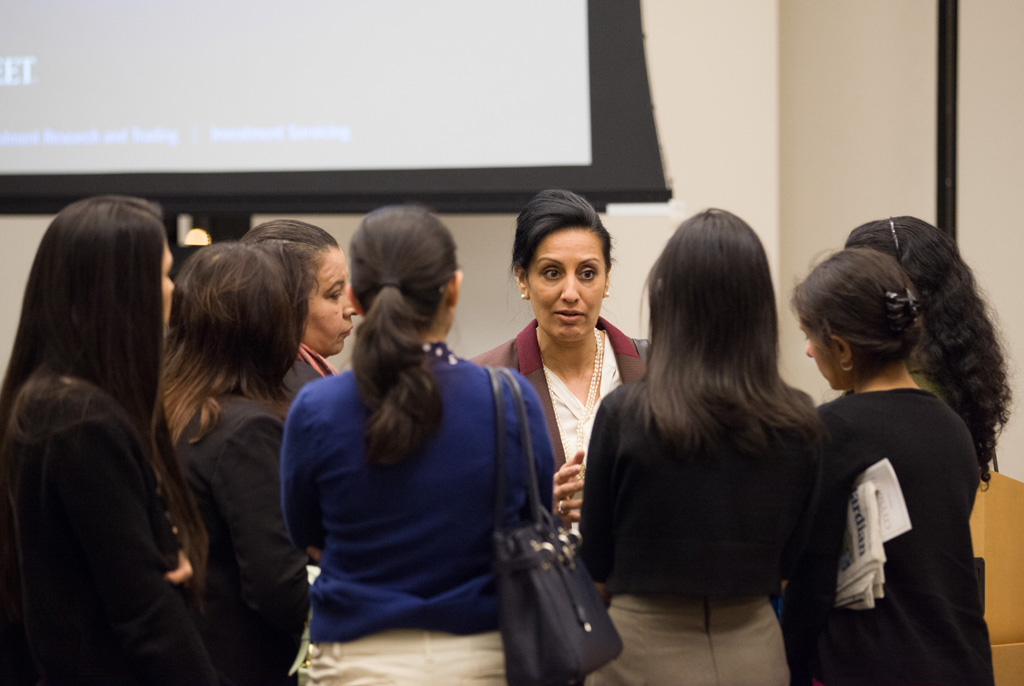
Dr Kamel Hothi OBE renowned for mentoring hundreds of Sikh/BAME female professionals

Hothi has worked at Lloyds Bank since the age of 16. Kamel became TSB's first female manager in the South-east and the bank's first Asian manager.

She is credited with developing the Asian Strategy across Lloyds Banking Group, an initiative aimed at improving access to financial services for ethnic minority communities across Britain. She was also a founding member of the Lloyds TSB Steering Group and led the bank's 250th anniversary celebrations.

She is an advisory board member of the Queen’s Commonwealth Trust Fund setup in 2018 aimed at connecting young leaders who are working hard to change the world and an Ambassador for the Alzheimer’s Society after pledging to help tackle social stigma around dementia among Asian communities

== Awards and recognition ==
In the 2017 Birthday Honours, Kamel was appointed an Officer of the Order of the British Empire for services to promoting diversity in banking. She received an honorary degree in 2011 by the World Sikh University and a Diversity Champion award in 2025.

== See also ==
- List of British Sikhs
