= Mohinder Singh Ahluwalia =

British businessman

Bhai Sahib Bhai Mohinder Singh Ahluwalia OBE KSG
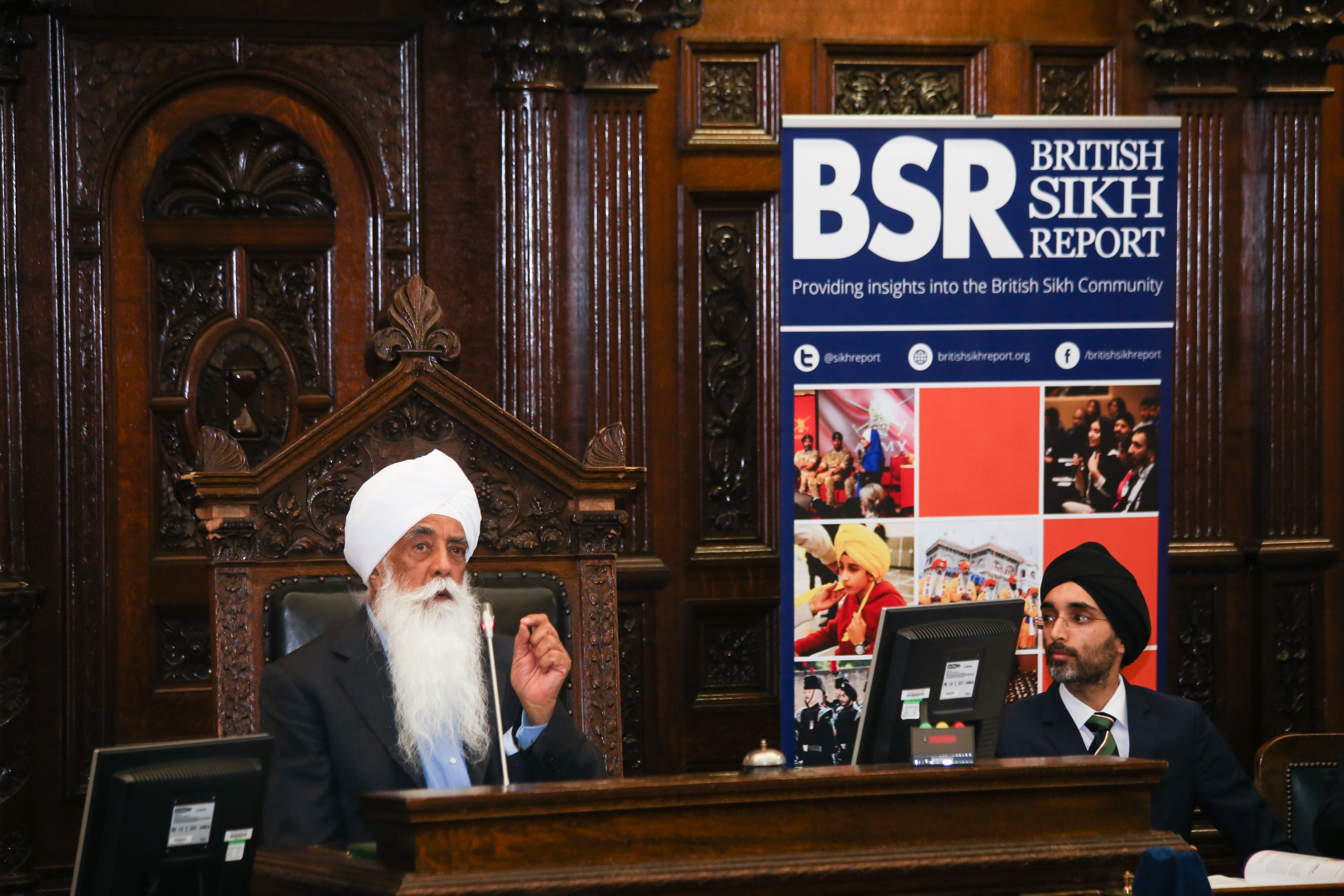
- Born: Gulu
- Education: Civil Engineering
- Occupation: Chairman
- Years active: 1995–present
- Known for: Interfaith work

Bhai Sahib Bhai Mohinder Singh Ahluwalia OBE KSG (born on 31 March 1939 in Gulu, Uganda) is the chairman of the Guru Nanak Nishkam Sewak Jatha UK. He is listed in the top 100 most influential Sikhs in the world.

== Career ==
Bhai Sahib has worked as chairman of the GNNSJ since 1995.

He is the first British Sikh to be awarded the official title of ‘Bhai Sahib’ by the Shiromani Gurudwara Parbandhak Committee, SGPC, Amritsar (the Sikh ‘apex’ organisation representing some 26 million Sikhs globally), for his selfless service in propagating the Sikh faith, engagement in interfaith work and heritage conservation.

He is a patron of the Darbar Festival, a founding member of the European Council of Religious Leaders and Co‑President of Religions for Peace International.

== Awards and recognition ==
In the 2015 New Year Honours, Bhai Sahib was appointed an Officer of the Order of the British Empire for services to Interfaith and community cohesion.

In 2012 Bhai Sahib made history by becoming the first Sikh in the world to be honoured with the Pontifical Order of Knighthood of St Gregory for his interfaith work.

In addition he has received a wide range of awards recognising his community work including:

- An honorary degree from Aston University in 2014
- The Third GCGI Award for Public Service in the Interest of the Common Good presented at the 12th Annual GCGI International Conference in 2014
- Juliet Hollister Award from the Temple of Understanding in 2008. Past awardees have included the XIVth Dalai Lama, Archbishop Emeritus Desmond Tutu and Nelson Mandela.
- An honorary degree from Birmingham City University in 2006
- An honorary degree from the University of Central England in 2001

== See also ==
- List of British Sikhs
