= Jaz Rai =

British activist

Jaz Rai OBE Esq.
- ਜਸਵਿੰਦਰ ਰਾਏ
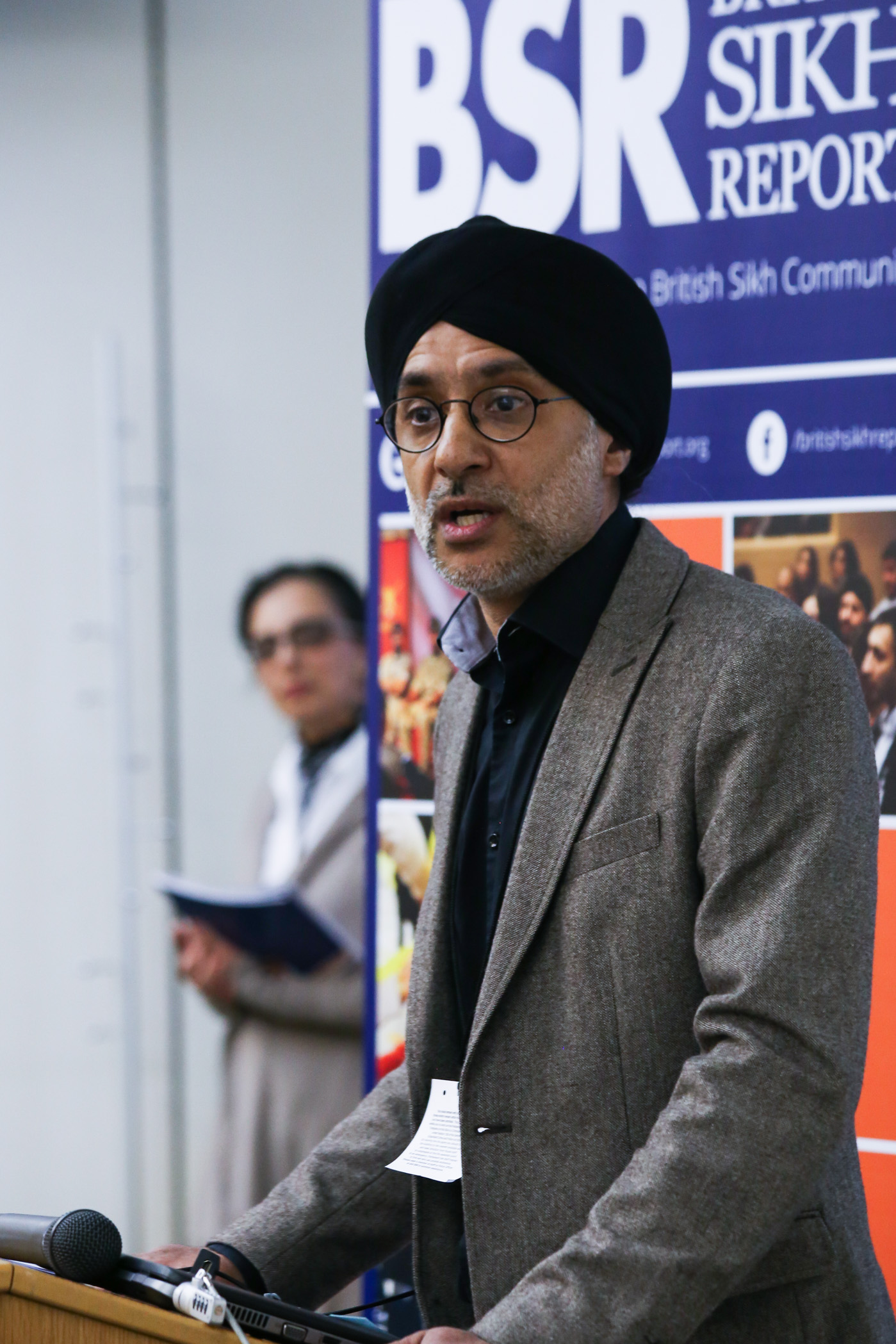
- Born: Derby
- Education: Engineering
- Occupations: Community Leader; Aerospace Engineer
- Years active: 2006–present
- Employer: Rolls-Royce
- Known for: Supporting people with addictions
- Television: Sikh Channel
- Board member of: Sikh Recovery Network
- Awards: Points of Light Award (2020)
- Honours: Officer of the Most Excellent Order of the British Empire OBE (2021)

Jasvinder "Jaz" Rai OBE (Punjabi:: ਜਸਵਿੰਦਰ ਰਾਏ, born in Derby) is a British Aerospace engineer, community leader and chairperson of the Sikh Recovery Network which supports people with alcohol and drug addictions. He regularly talks about addiction and other issues of importance to the Sikh community in the media and in 2020, was recognised by 10 Downing Street for his work supporting people with drug and alcohol addiction. He was appointed Officer of the Order of the British Empire (OBE) in the 2021 Birthday Honours.

== Career and work ==
Jaz Rai is founder and chairperson of the Sikh Recovery Network. He set up the network after his own addiction challenges with alcohol which included drinking up to 1 litre of vodka a day. He now supports people with addictions in a number of cities including Leicester and Derby.

In 2011, his relative Kalwinder Singh Dhindsa, designed the first Sikh poppy khanda holder in honour of the 80000 Sikhs that gave their lives in the world wars and raised thousands of pounds for the Royal British Legion. As a result, they were both invited to attend the remembrance festival at London's Royal Albert Hall.

In 2015, Jaz Rai hosted the first Alcohol and Beyond TV show on Sikh Channel and due to the success of the show it is currently in its 9th season.

In 2016, he was invited to New York to address the UN's General Assembly over 3 days regarding the global challenges of the world drug problem.

== Awards and recognition ==
In 2019, his charity was given official recognition with the charity commission.

In 2020, he was recognised as a ‘Points of Light’ winner by 10 Downing Street for his work supporting people with drug and alcohol addiction.

In the 2021 Birthday Honours, Jaz Singh was appointed an Officer of the Order of the British Empire for services to the Sikh community during the COVID-19 pandemic. He is one of a handful of Sikhs in the world to hold this distinction.

== Views ==
Jaz Rai regularly talks about addiction and other issues of importance to the Sikh community in the media.

== See also ==
- List of British Sikhs
