= Rajendra Singh (disambiguation) =

Rajendra Singh (born 1959) is a water conservationist.

Rajendra Singh is also the name of:

- Rajendra Singh (brigadier) (1899–1947), officer in the Indian Army
- Rajendra Singh (RSS) (1921–2003), fourth sarsanghchalak of the Rashtriya Swayamsevak Sangh
- Rajendra Singh (politician) (born 1951), member of Uttarakhand Legislative Assembly
- Rajendra Singh (coast guard) (born 1959), former Director general of the Indian Coast Guard
- Rajendra Singh Babu (born 1952), Kannada film maker and producer
- Rajendra Singh Lodha (?–2008), Indian chartered accountant
- Rajendra Singh Paroda (born 1942), Indian agricultural scientist
- Rajendra Kumar Singh, Indian politician from Madhya Pradesh
- Rajendra Pratap Singh (born 1954), Indian politician from Uttar Pradesh

== See also ==
- Rajinder Singh (disambiguation)
