= Sunny and Shay =

British Radio presenting duo

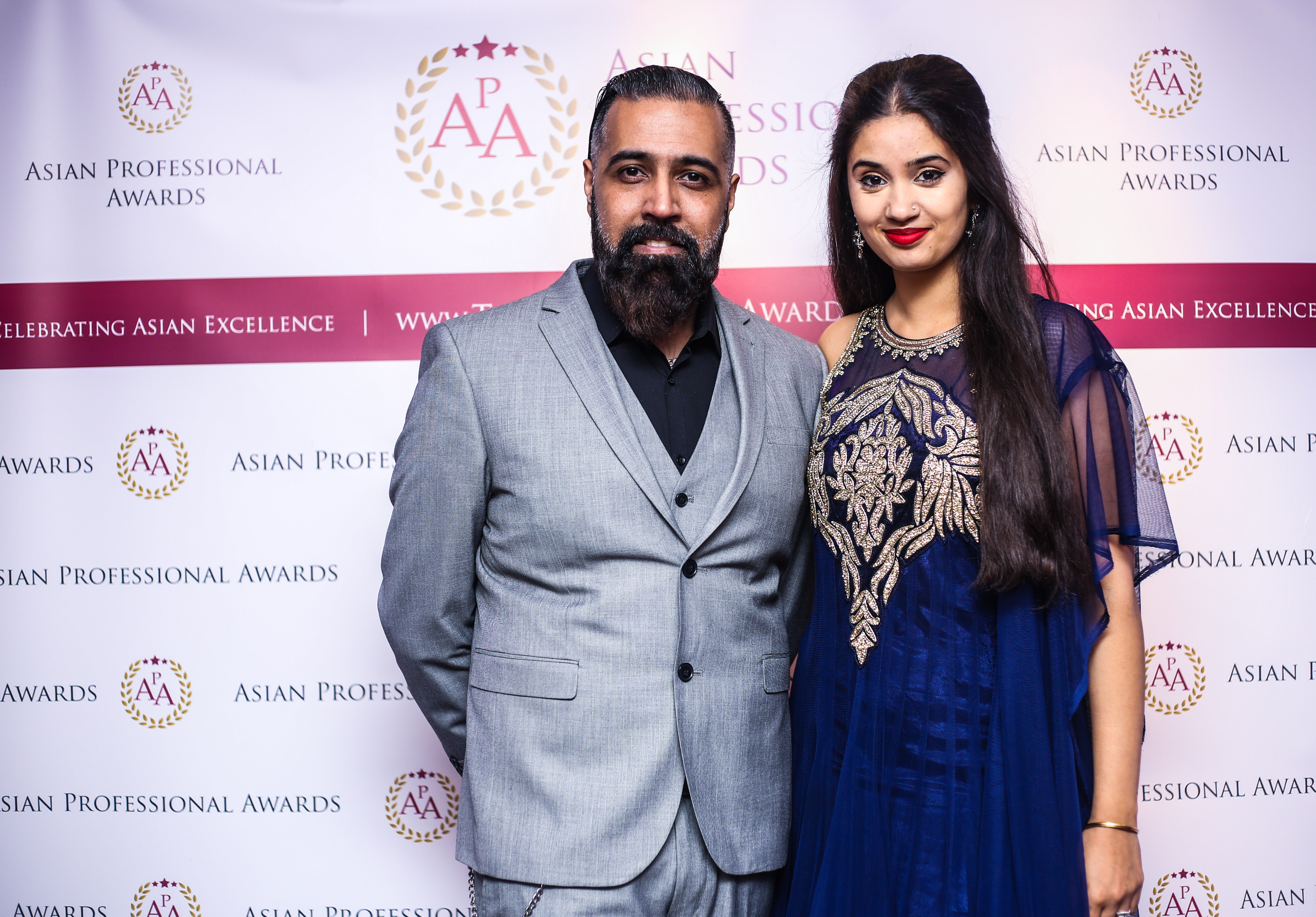
- Born: Mandeep Singh Grewal and Gursharonjit Kaur Grewal; London
- Occupation: Radio/television presenters
- Years active: 2009–present
- Employer: BBC
- Known for: Media Personalities
- Awards: Best Personality Presenters at New York Radio Awards; Media Award at GG2 Leadership Awards; Media Award at Asian Women of Achievement Awards

Sunny and Shay (Sunny born 1975, Shay born 1984) are a British Radio presenting husband and wife duo consisting of Mandeep "Sunny" and Gursharonjit "Shay" Grewal, both from London.

== Career ==
Sunny and Shay present a number of shows including the BBC Radio WM afternoon slot for which they became the first high profile Asian presenters to do so in addition to the BBC Asian Network and BBC Radio London.

They became a household name after appearing on the Channel 4 show The Family in 2009.

They support and attend a number of high profile events throughout the year including the Asian Awards and the Indian Film Festival. They co-hosted the Brit Asia TV Music Awards with Sukhi Bart, in 2014 and 2015. In 2019 Shay also hosted the first Asian woman festival.

Prior to becoming radio presenters Sunny worked as a BAA security officer at Heathrow Airport and Shay was a HR consultant in the City.

== Awards and recognition ==
- They are annually featured in the Asian power couples list.
- In August 2019 they won the New York Festival radio award.
- In November 2017 they won the GG2 Media & Creative Arts Award.
- In May 2017 Shay was presented with the Asian Women of Achievement Award by Cherie Blair and named the Media Award Winner.
- In December 2016 Shay was ranked as one of the top 10 inspirational Sikh women in Britain.

== Personal life ==
In 2017 they announced they were expecting a baby and in 2018 they were featured in Channel 4's documentary One Born Every Minute as millions viewed Shay give birth to their daughter.

== See also ==
- List of British Sikhs
