= The Family (1974 TV series) =

- Genre: Reality Television
- Directed by: Franc Roddam; Paul Watson
- Starring: Heather Wilkins; Margaret Wilkins; Marian Wilkins; Terry Wilkins; Gary Wilkins; Chris Wilkins; Tom Bernes; Karen Wilkins; Scott Wilkins
- Theme music composer: Dave Brooks
- Opening theme: Dave Brooks
- Ending theme: Dave Brooks
- Composer: Dave Brooks
- Country of origin: United Kingdom
- Original language: English
- No. of series: 1
- No. of episodes: 12

Production
- Producer: Paul Watson
- Running time: 30 mins

Original release
- Network: BBC1
- Release: 3 April – 26 June 1974

Related
- The Family (2008); The Family (2011)

The Family is a 1974 BBC television series made by producer Paul Watson, and directed by Franc Roddam. It is a fly-on-the-wall documentary series, seen by many as the precursor to reality television. It is similar to an American documentary which had aired the previous year (but which had been filmed in 1971), called An American Family.

The series follows the Reading-based working class Wilkins family of six, headed by Margaret and Terry, through their daily lives, warts and all. It culminates in the marriage of one of the daughters, which was plagued by fans and paparazzi alike.

The show was the basis for two parodies: Monty Python's Flying Circus, in their last episode, which aired on 5 December 1974, featured a sketch called "The Most Awful Family in Britain 1974"; and Benny Hill, on one of his 1975 specials, did a takeoff called "That Family".

== Aftermath ==
The day after the series ended, BBC Two's In Vision asked whether viewers had learned anything from the programme about the problems of living in an urban society, and whether we actually really knew the Wilkins family. Later in the year on 12 October Both Sides of The Family asked similar questions, with input from sociologist Colin Bell and a psychologist. As with the main series this was produced by Paul Watson.

The series was repeated on BBC Two from 17 September 1983 to 3 December 1983, as the start of a 'Fly on the Wall' season. Like the subsequent series in the season, Sailor, a follow-up programme was transmitted. The 40-minute special, sub-titled "The After-Years", was shown on 10 December, with Franc Roddam and Paul Watson both returning. On 6 November (the day after the repeat of episode nine), Margaret Wilkins was one of the three guests on Did You See...?

The whole series was then repeated again in a late night slot over three weeks from 11 to 29 July 1988, again on BBC Two. On 25 July (the day episode nine was to be repeated), the Wilkins family were guests on Wogan. "The After-Years" was repeated at 9pm on 30 July, this time in an hour-long slot, as it was followed by a new interview between Margaret Wilkins and Paul Watson.

Margaret and Terry divorced three years after the programme's broadcast due to Terry's ill health. Both remarried; Margaret became Margaret Sainsbury. She died of a reported heart attack in Berkshire on 10 August 2008, aged 73. Terry died on 31 October 2016, aged 82.

The format was revived in 2008 (see The Family).
