= Kalwant Bhopal =

Indian social scientist

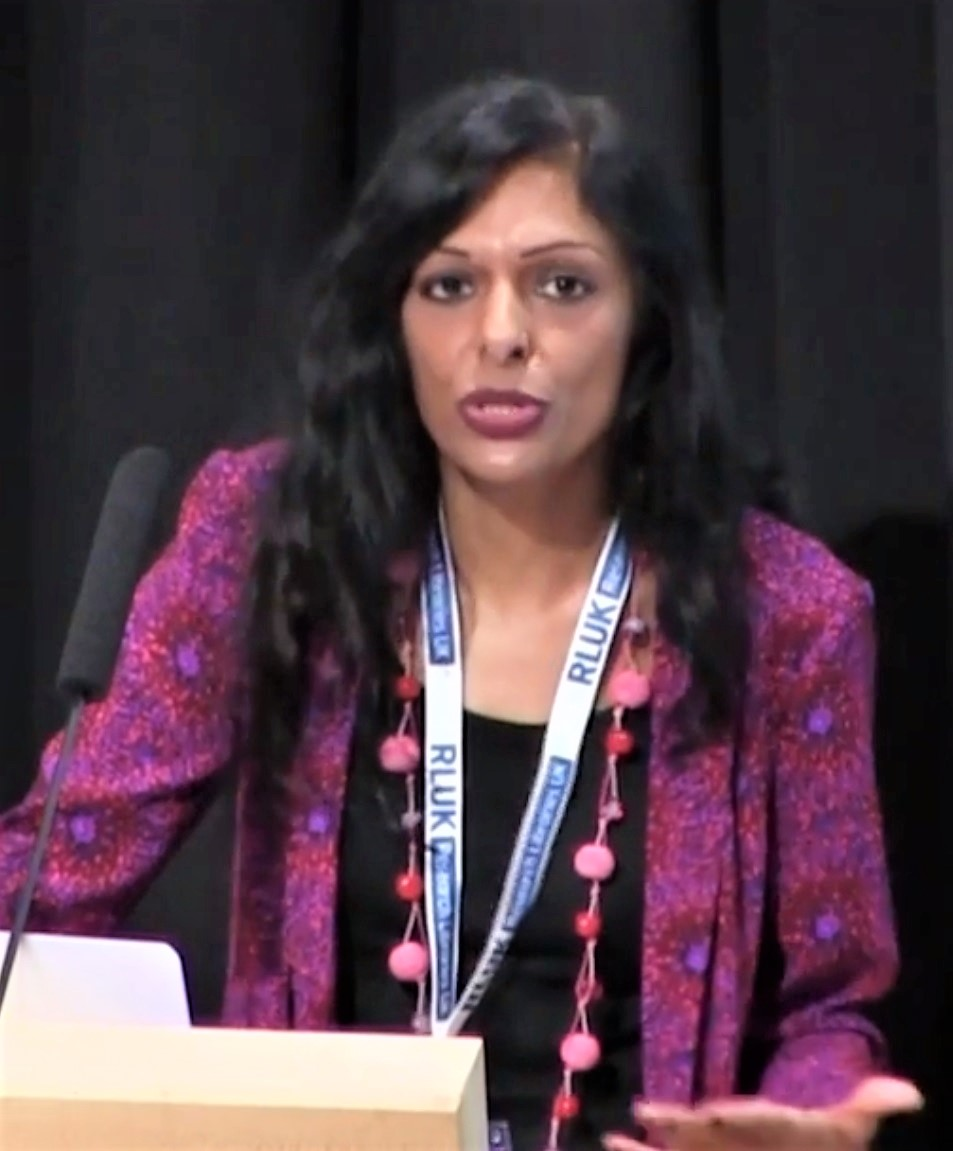
- Kalwant Bhopal speaks at RLUK in 2017
- Scientific career
- Workplaces: UCL Institute of Education; University of Southampton; Harvard Graduate School of Education; University of Birmingham
- Thesis: The position of South Asian women in households in the UK (1996)
- Doctoral advisor: Sylvia Walby

Kalwant Bhopal MBE, FAcSS is Professor of Education and Social Justice and Director of the Centre for Research in Race & Education at the University of Birmingham. Her work explores the achievements and experiences of minority ethnic groups in education with a focus on how processes of racism, exclusion and marginalisation operate in predominantly White spaces.

== Early life and education ==
Bhopal was born in England and is of Indian descent. She studied sociology in her undergraduate degree, before completing a Postgraduate Certificate in Education in further education. She then completed an MSc in sociology at the London School of Economics before completing her doctoral degree at the University of Bristol. She worked as a research associate at the UCL Institute of Education. Here she conducted research on the educational experiences of UK Gypsy and Travellers During her early career she claims to have experienced both subtle and overt racism.

== Research and career ==
Bhopal worked at the School of Education, University of Southampton, from 2006 where she served as Professor of Education and Social Justice. In 2015 she was appointed Equality and Diversity Champion for the University of Southampton Faculty of Social, Human and Mathematical Sciences. Here she researched the considerable effort that black and ethnic minority staff have to make to reach higher levels of academia and the educational experiences of other underrepresented groups including Gypsies and Travellers. She studied how the everyday aspects of teaching and learning serve to marginalise certain groups of students. A result of this work was the creation of recommendations for how race, diversity and inclusion should be taught in postgraduate education courses.

She joined the Harvard Graduate School of Education in 2017, where she spent two years as a visiting professor. That year she moved from the University of Southampton to the University of Birmingham. At Birmingham she was appointed Professorial Research Fellow and deputy director of the Centre for Research in Race & Education. In January 2020 she was appointed Director of the Centre for Research in Race & Education. Bhopal was appointed Member of the Order of the British Empire (MBE) in the 2020 New Year Honours for services to race equality in education.

Bhopal has investigated race inequality and racism in UK academia. She claims that racism is present in academia in various ways; including the marginalisation of black and minority ethnic staff, their exclusion from decision-making, frequent micro-aggressions, implicit bias and open prejudice. She argues that dealing with racism is currently not a priority for UK universities. In a 2016 report from the University and College Union, almost three-quarters of black and minority ethnic staff reported that they had experienced racial harassment and bullying from managers. The same research has claimed that UK academia has racist recruitment and promotion practises and a considerable ethnic pay gap. Bhopal argues that radical change is needed to support black and minority ethnic students. She has argued that universities work towards equality in general terms, without confronting uncomfortable practises, and ultimately perpetuating white privilege. Bhopal has called for more financial investment in the Equality Challenge Unit Race Equality Charter, so that universities recognise that it is as important as Athena SWAN. She has claimed that diversity initiatives in the United Kingdom mainly benefit white middle-class women, and that whilst most universities view gender as a universal issue race is largely ignored.

== Selected publications ==
Her publications include:

- Bhopal, Kalwant (2024). Race and Education: Reproducing White Supremacy in Britain. Penguin Pelican. ISBN 9780241537329.
- Bhopal, Kalwant; Myers, Martin (2023). Elite Universities and the Making of Privilege. Abingdon, Oxon; New York, NY: Routledge. ISBN 978-0-367-46607-7.
- Bhopal, Kalwant (2018). White Privilege: the myth of a post-racial society. Policy Press. ISBN 9781447335979.
- Bhopal, Kalwant and Martin Myers (2018) Home Schooling and Home Education: race, class and inequality. Routledge. ISBN 978-1138651340
- Bhopal, Kalwant (2016). The experiences of black and minority ethnic academics: a comparative study of the unequal academy. London; New York, NY: Routledge. ISBN 978-1-315-81834-4.
- Bhopal, Kalwant (26 June 2015). The Experiences of Black and Minority Ethnic Academics. Routledge. ISBN 978-1-317-81659-1.
- Bhopal, Kalwant (2010). Asian Women in Higher Education: Shared Communities. Trentham Books. ISBN 9781858564692.
- Bhopal, Kalwant (2000). Connecting Children: Care and Family Life in Later Childhood. Routledge. ISBN 9780203996355.

Bhopal is editor-in-chief of Women's Studies International Forum, executive editor of the British Journal of Sociology of Education, and serves on various editorial boards including the journal Race Ethnicity and Education. She has also written for The Conversation and Times Higher Education.
