= Jo Sidhu =

Disbarred British criminal law barrister

- Navjot Sidhu
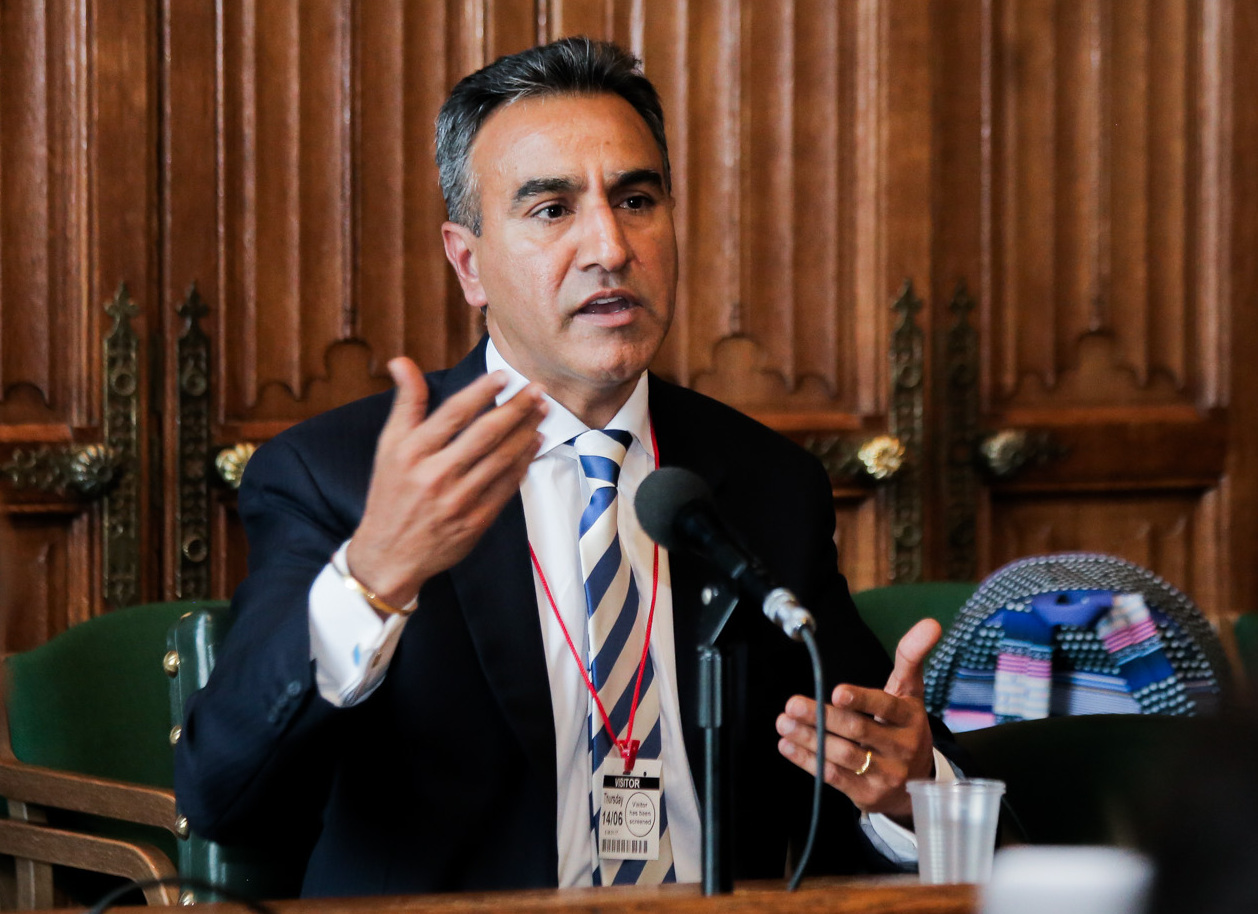
- Navjot Sidhu speaking at an event in parliament 2018
- Born: London, England
- Education: London School of Economics; University of Oxford
- Spouse: Luna Sidhu
- Father: Pritam Singh Sidhu
- Relatives: Ravi Sidhu

Navjot Sidhu (Punjabi: ਜੋ ਸਿਧੁ) is a disbarred British criminal law barrister, and former King's Counsel.

== Career ==
Sidhu had worked as a criminal law barrister since 1993.

He is a past chairman of the Criminal Bar Association. He was the chairperson for the Society of Asian lawyers, the biggest BAME lawyers' society in the UK representing more than 3,000 members and from 2001 he was the vice-chair of the Equality & Diversity Committee of the Bar Council.

In 2012, Sidhu was appointed Queen's Counsel, a rank awarded to about 8% of practising barristers. He was one of about 100 BAME QCs in Britain of whom few have Punjabi origin.

Sidhu specialised in serious crime, typically terrorism, homicides and conspiracies involving frauds, robberies and drug trafficking. He was a target of death threats and online harassment lasting 12 months in 2015. After police were unable to provide assistance owing to a lack of resources, Sidhu hired a forensic computer expert to track the cyber-criminal behind the smear campaign, who was then jailed for five years.

Sidhu has said that the government must do more to tackle cyber threats of this nature.

On 8 September 2023, the appellant received notice of the BSB’s disciplinary proceedings Upon notification of the proceedings, the appellant took voluntary steps to limit his contact with female students and junior members of the Bar. These steps included ceasing to take any mini-pupils and removing himself from the Register of Pupil Supervisors. The appellant also ceased accepting new instructions as of 25 October 2023 and subsequently withdrew from his elected positions on the Bar Council and Lincoln's Inn.

Sidhu voluntarily relinquished his practising certificate on 5 July 2024.

In December 2024, a disciplinary panel upheld as proven three charges of professional misconduct by Sidhu for inappropriately initiated sexual contact with a female paralegal. Of the three proven allegations, the Bar Standard Board tribunal found that Sidhu invited a woman in her 20s to his hotel room while she was on a mini-pupillage (work experience) with him, then asked her to stay the night, changed into his pyjamas and created a pillow “barricade” on the bed. This was despite her protests that she wanted to leave the room or sleep on the sofa, she stated in her evidence. In reaching its decision, the tribunal noted that the misconduct occurred in a professional setting and was directed at a person in a vulnerable position; and the tribunal found that the misconduct was deliberate, sexual in nature and involved elements of planning by Sidhu. The panel ordered that a certificate to practise should be withheld until the sanctions hearing. He was disbarred in March 2025.

In June 2025, three women who alleged "predatory and grooming" behaviour by Sidhu spoke to Channel 4 News about their experience, as a leading peer and former solicitor general calls for a "moment of reckoning" about sexual misconduct in the legal profession.

On 9 June 2025, the Bar Standards Board (BSB), the regulatory body for barristers in England and Wales, issued a formal apology to the complainants in the case against barrister Navjot "Jo" Sidhu. In a public statement, the BSB acknowledged that its handling of the case had caused further distress to the individuals involved, stating: "We added to the trauma." The apology marked a significant moment in the ongoing scrutiny of regulatory responses to professional misconduct in the legal sector.

Harriet Harman's 2025 Independent Review of Bullying and Harassment at the Bar discussed the case concerning Jo Sidhu KC, the report noted that the Tribunal did not accept that the relationship between Person 3 and Sidhu fell within the scope of the professional regulator, given the passage of time between her mini-pupillage and the alleged conduct. Person 3 gave evidence that she had received requests from Sidhu for photographs of naked parts of her body, as well as requests for sexual role play and video calls. The Tribunal Chair described the conduct as “reprehensible” and something that would “shock” the public. However, the Tribunal held that the conduct did not fall within the regulator’s remit on the basis that the relationship between Sidhu and his former mini-pupil was no longer “professional”.

However, Harman's report stated that relationships that originate in a professional context and involve a clear power dynamic should fall within the regulator's scope where the alleged misconduct is likely to affect the reputation of the profession. The report argued that where sexual misconduct arises from a relationship formed through a professional connection, it should be assessed in light of its professional origins and power dynamics. It further observed that, even where there is no continuing professional nexus, misconduct may be so serious that it raises questions about whether an individual can meet the standards expected of the profession. Harman concluded that the complaint by Person 3 should have been treated as professional misconduct, noting that the connection between Sidhu and Person 3 stemmed from her position as a law student seeking to enter the profession, and that the seriousness of the alleged conduct warranted regulatory enforcement action.

In November 2025, Sidhu's brother Ravi Sidhu, a former barrister and author, was disbarred after being found guilty of professional misconduct, in a case noted for its parallels with his own fiction. Sidhu had written Call This Justice, a novel about a rule-breaking Crown Prosecution Service (CPS) prosecutor who engages in reckless conduct while evading detection. In practice, Ravi Sidhu was found to have acted dishonestly after accepting instructions through Citadel Chambers in Birmingham for an inquest but subsequently excluding the chambers from the matter without the client's knowledge. He issued invoices on chambers-headed paper that listed his personal bank account details and recorded his working days as holiday. Ravi Sidhu received £40,000 from a vulnerable, recently bereaved client, who was later distressed to learn that his work had not been conducted through chambers. Although Ravi Sidhu argued before the Bar Tribunal that the situation arose from an honest mistake and that he later reimbursed the chambers' fees, the tribunal found that he had deliberately created a misleading impression in order to avoid paying chambers' fees. He was disbarred, ordered to pay £3,000 in costs, and found to have acted dishonestly.

In December 2025, Sidhu appealed the professional regulator's decision to disbar him following findings of serious professional misconduct. The appeal was heard by a specialist panel of the High Court. In the 51-page judgment, the tribunal rejected Sidhu's appeal and upheld the sanction of disbarment.

The High Court judge said that the tribunal did take account of the appellant's personal circumstances and the fact that he contributed greatly to the profession. However, the weight (if any) to be attached to such matters in a particular case is a matter for the tribunal. The personal circumstances, such as his difficult childhood, were not said to have had any bearing on the misconduct in question. As stated in the guidance, one needs to exercise caution about mitigation based on personal circumstances as, "Many practitioners will face personal challenges, such as ill-health, bereavement and divorce, but do not resort to committing misconduct".

The judge emphasised that the misconduct did not stem from an "unwise, spontaneous and consensual sexual encounter", but involved the use of professional position to "pressurise a young female mini-pupil into a compromising situation in order to gratify his own sexual desires". The tribunal concluded that such conduct was particularly serious and could not be adequately addressed by any sanction less than disbarment.

== Awards and recognition ==
In 2016, Sidhu was awarded the UK's Asian Professional of the Year Award 2016.
