= Peter Bance =

British historian

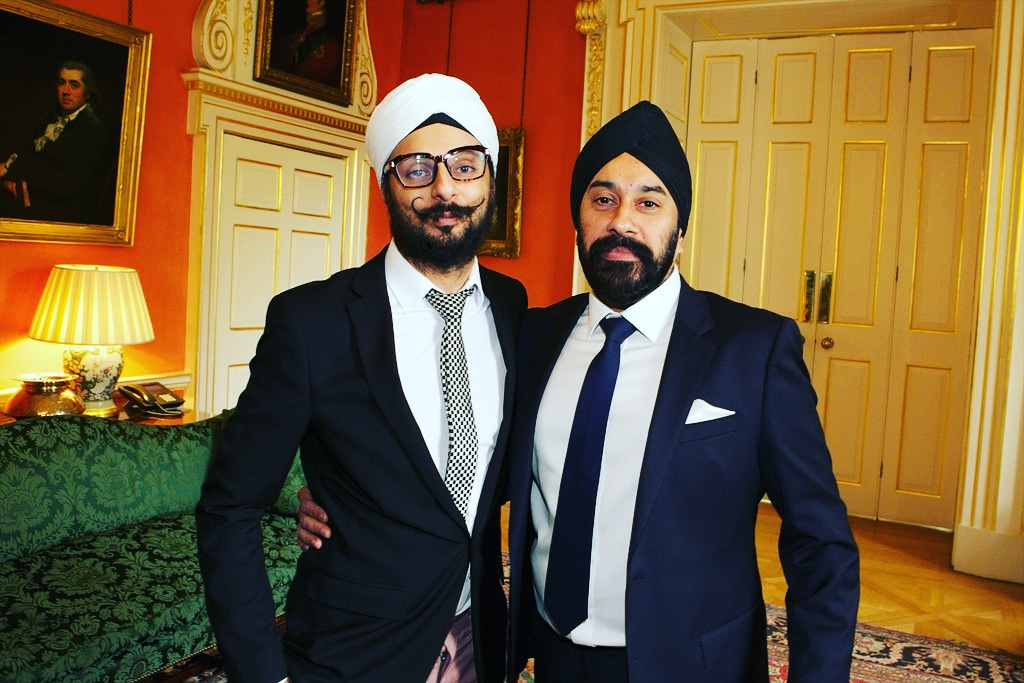
Peter Bance with Param Singh, the Deputy Chairman of City Sikhs, at Number 10 Downing Street

Peter Bance, born Bhupinder Singh Bance, is a Sikh historian, author, art collector, antiquarian, and Maharaja Duleep Singh archivist. He focuses on correct preservation, restoration, and documentation of Anglo-Punjab history. He has written three books on Duleep Singh and his family.

== Biography ==
=== Family background ===
Bance's family has its origins in Sialkot district, located in present-day Pakistan. His family had immigrated to the United Kingdom in the 1930s. His grandfather, from Daska, Sialkot, immigrated to England in 1936.

=== Early life ===
Bance was born in the United Kingdom as a third-generation British-Sikh. Bance was originally a marketing student, however upon a visit to Duleep Singh's grave in Elveden, he became interested in Sikh history. Whilst in Thetford, the young Bance was directed to a small museum, which had been started by the son of Duleep Singh. Bance became curious whilst visiting the museum and asked the curator questions on if any literature or old records covering Duleep Singh's family can be found, which the curator responded no to.

=== Research work and collection ===
After this visit, Bance became deeply engrossed in researching Duleep Singh's life story and that of his descendants. He first placed advertisements in local papers seeking information about Duleep Singh's children from locals, after which receiving 300–400 responses in the first six months. The responses came from people who claimed to have known Duleep Singh's children to others who claimed a grandparent had worked for Duleep Singh. Others more claimed to have personal artefacts attributed to Duleep Singh, such as diaries, clothing, and photographs. Bance dedicated one year meeting with these claimants, gathering information on Duleep Singh and his family and purchasing some artefacts from them. Bance admits that some of the people he visited just outright gave him artefacts, as they noticed his dedication to the topic. Duleep Singh's children by this point in-time had all been deceased, so their belongings came into the possession of locals or people who had once worked for them. In-time, they passed into the hands of the descendants of those people, who felt nil personal attachment to the items. This allowed Bance to start building-up his own personal collection of Duleep Singh-related artefacts and memorabilia.

To pursue further research, Bance travelled to Lahore, Pakistan in 2004 to find out more on the story of Duleep Singh and his family. He visited his ancestral, familial home located in Daska, Sialkot. Afterwards, he went onward to Gujranwala and paid visits to locations associated with the Sukerchakia dynasty of Ranjit Singh. In 2004, Bance released his first book. His first book was the result of two-years of personal research.

After his initial visit to Pakistan, Bance would travel to both India and Pakistan multiple times. During his visits to Lahore, he worked together with local Sikh-era experts. Bance believes visits to Pakistan are necessary to study 19th century Punjab, as the majority of Sikh Empire-related historical sites and architecture are to be found there.

Bance has researched historical Sikh religious sites in Pakistan, advocating for the preservation of surviving sites. He has recommended that Sikhs visit religious sites currently in Pakistan to help conserve them. Bance was saddened by the dilapidated state of Sikh sites in Pakistan but was glad that many of them were still extant. Comparing the status of Sikh sites in present-day India, where the majority of Sikhs live today, Bance criticized the destruction of the originality of the sites under the guise of "renovation", whereby historical structures are toppled and new buildings take their former place. An example cited by him of sites losing their originality relates to nanakshahi bricks, which are characteristic of Sikh architecture from the 19th century, being replaced by renovators of historical Sikh sites in India by marble and gold. Bance advocates that a grassroots movement advocating for the proper restoration and preservation of historical Sikh sites and their original architecture is necessary, which works together with private enthusiasts and government bodies in-cooperation with one another. Bance further claims that a lack of willpower rather than a lack of funds is responsible for the poor conservation of Sikh historical sites.

Bance believes that the way forward in the modern-age to conserve Sikh heritage must be a digital approach, where social networking and technology is utilized to share research, build-up archives, and promote tourism to these sites. Increased tourism has the potential to increase efforts to preserve and restore Sikh heritage sites. Bance uses the Instagram platform to bring light to forgotten Sikh heritage lying in Pakistan with the wider community, using engagements there to generate social awareness and passion. Through his Instagram account, Bance has been contacted by persons interested in restoring Sikh heritage sites, which have allowed them to be connected with others who specialize in this field. Furthermore, he claims that on a weekly-basis hundreds of members of the general public from both India and Pakistan contact him through social media requesting him to visit their locality to document the Sikh heritage located there, as they lack the know-how on how to do this themselves.

Bance states that although Sikhs passionately request that historical materials related to them currently in foreign collections be returned to Sikhs, that the heritage itself that was left in Sikh-control has not been properly taken care of. Bance states that whilst items gifted to the British by the Sikhs have been taken care of in British hands, the things that other parties gifted to the Sikhs at Lahore has not been similarly looked after with such care. He criticizes families of former Sikh princely states in the post-independence-era for auctioning off their historical collections to private buyers to make money rather than handing them over to the government. In-contrast to this, Bance praises the British museums currently holding historical Sikh-related materials, in that their manner of handling and obtaining these items is far superior in-terms of historical preservation and from an ethical perspective.

Another book he released later-on delve into the relationship between local Sikh gurdwaras, Sikh migration, and Sikh experiences in the United Kingdom.

Bance has amassed a collection of artefacts related to Duleep Singh and his family, such as clothing, weapons, photographs, and personal writings (such as diaries). He has exhibited at museums such as the Victoria & Albert Museum, the British Museum, and the Bard Graduate Center. Some curious items from his collection include the personal Bible of Duleep Singh from Fatehgarh.

In 2015, he was credited for discovering what had happened to Princess Pauline Duleep Singh, daughter of Duleep Singh and his second-wife, in France. He is also credited with uncovering the graves of Prince Victor Duleep Singh and his wife Monte Carlo, and Maharani Jind Kaur's gravestone in Kensal Green, London.

Apart from his historical research and artefact collecting pursuits, he operates a London-based property business. He is a frequent contributor to BBC Radios Suffolk, Norfolk, and London.

In 2026, he released his third book on Duleep Singh's family and he lent part of his collection for The Last Princesses of Punjab exhibition at Kensington Palace. After November, the collection will be displayed in Canada.

== Documentaries ==
He has also appeared in many BBC programmes such as The Story Of The Turban (2012), Inside Out (2004), Desi DNA (2005), Britain's Maharajah (2013), Sophia: Suffragette Princess (2015) and The Stolen Maharajah: Britain's Indian Royal (2018)

== Bibliography ==
Bance is the author of several books:

- The Duleep Singhs: Photograph Album of Queen Victoria's Maharajah (2004)
- Khalsa Jatha British Isles Centenary 1908-2008 (2008)
- Sikhs in Britain: 150 Years of Photography (2012)
- Sovereign, Squire and Rebel: Maharajah Duleep Singh & the Heirs of a Lost Kingdom (2009)
- The Last Royals of Lahore: The Duleep Singhs (2026)

== Filmography ==
Bance had collaborated with Satinder Sartaaj in producing the 2017 film, The Black Prince.

Bance is currently working with Kajri Babbar on a British Film Institute film, titled Lioness, that is about Sophia Duleep Singh.
