= Skipping Sikh =

Rajinder Singh MBE
- Born: 1946 or 1947 (age 78–79); India
- Notable work: Health and fitness videos

Rajinder Singh, MBE, more popularly known as the 'Skipping Sikh', is a British-Indian septuagenarian health and fitness personality.

== Career ==
During the 2020 COVID-19 pandemic, Singh started sharing exercise videos to inspire older members of the Asian community to stay healthy whilst also raising money for the NHS.

In 2021 Singh was invited to watch tennis in Wimbledon from the royal box. In the same year he also fulfilled a lifelong dream by running his first marathon at the age of 74.

He arrived in the UK from India in 1970 after his father, a soldier in the British Indian Army, encouraged him to build a better life abroad.

== Awards ==
- He was awarded an MBE in the 2020 Queen's Birthday Honours List for services to health and fitness which he dedicated to India.
- He was awarded a Points of Light award in 2020 from the Prime Minister Boris Johnson.
