= List of British Punjabis =

This is a list of prominent Punjabi people from the United Kingdom who may follow a variety of beliefs including Sikhism, Hinduism, Islam, Christianity or atheism.

== Academia and education ==
- Harminder Dua – discovered a previously unknown layer lurking in the human eye named the "dua's layer".
- Humayon Dar – director general of Islamic Research & Training Institute (IRTI)
- Jagjit Chadha – professor and chair in Money and Banking in the Department of Economics at the University of Kent
- Kalwant Bhopal – Professor of Education and Social Justice and Deputy Director of the Centre for Research in Race & Education at the University of Birmingham
- Max Arthur Macauliffe (1841–1913) – senior administrator of the British Raj who was posted in the Punjab; prolific scholar and author; converted to Sikhism in the 1860s
- Peter Bance – historian, author and Maharaja Duleep Singh archivist
- Simon Singh – mathematician and author
- Sukhbir Singh Kapoor – vice chancellor of The International School of Sikh Studies and Khalsa College London
- Tejinder Virdee – experimental particle physicist and professor of physics at Imperial College London

== Business and the professions ==
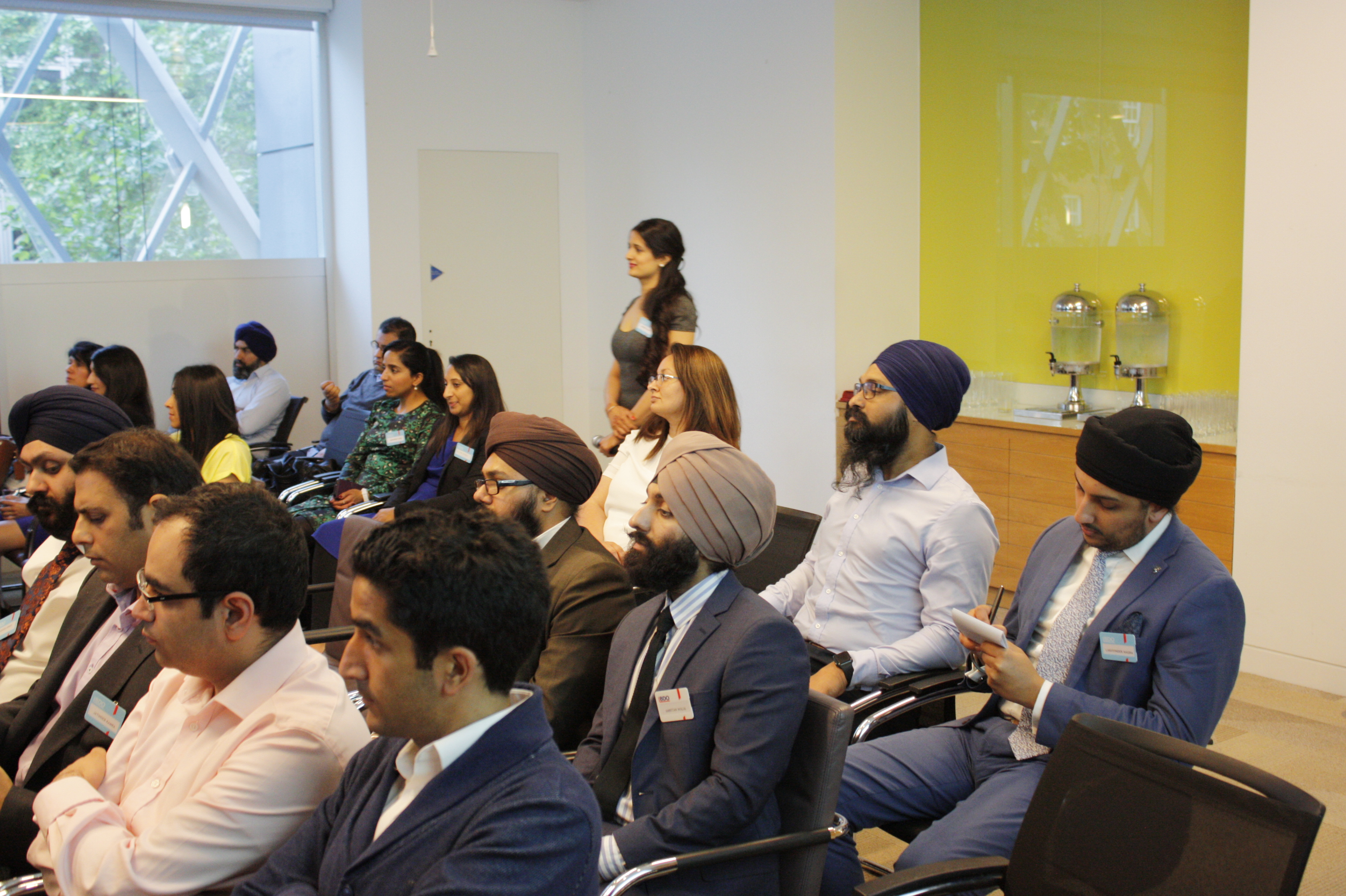
Punjabi professionals at a networking and inspirational City Sikhs events in London

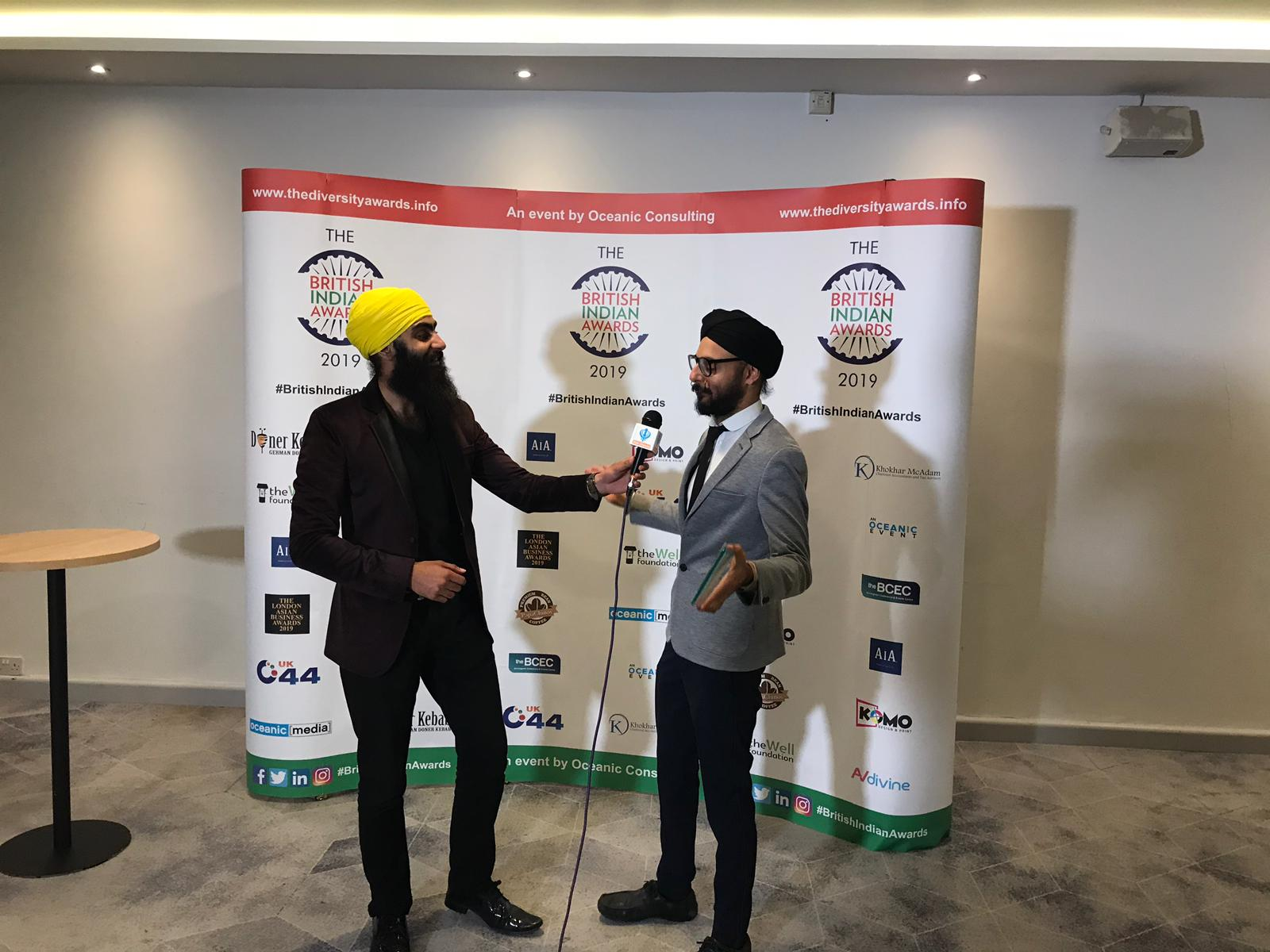
Business professional Param Singh speaking at an awards ceremony with YouTuber 'Flex Singh'

- Avtar Lit – former owner and chairman of Sunrise Radio Group
- Emran Mian – author and civil servant
- Aneel Mussarat – ranked the 466th richest person in the United Kingdom and 21st richest Asian in the UK in 2007 by the Sunday Times
- Sir Anwar Pervez – founder and chairman of Bestway
- Dabinderjit Singh – director at the National Audit Office
- James Caan – entrepreneur and Dragon's Den personality
- Jasminder Singh – chairman of the Radisson Edwardian hotel empire
- Jaz Rai – aerospace engineer and chairman of the Sikh Recovery Network
- Kamel Hothi – former banker at Lloyds Bank
- Karamjit Singh – chair of the University Hospitals of Leicester NHS Trust
- Kulveer Ranger – management consultant; former London Transport Minister and Mayor's Director of Environment and Digital London
- Mo Chaudry – chairman of WaterWorld aqua park
- Mohammad Naseem – GP
- Osama Saeed – Scottish communications professional
- Param Singh – business professional and entrepreneur
- Rami Ranger – founder of Sun Mark, an international marketing and distribution company
- Ranjit Singh Boparan – founder and owner of 2 Sisters Food Group
- Reuben Singh – CEO of contact centre company alldayPA
- Reena Ranger – director at Sun Mark and founder of Women Empowered Network
- Simon Arora – billionaire businessman, CEO of the retail chain B & M
- Surinder Arora – hotelier
- Tom Singh – founder of the high street fashion chain New Look
- Zameer Choudrey

== Charity, community and non-profit ==
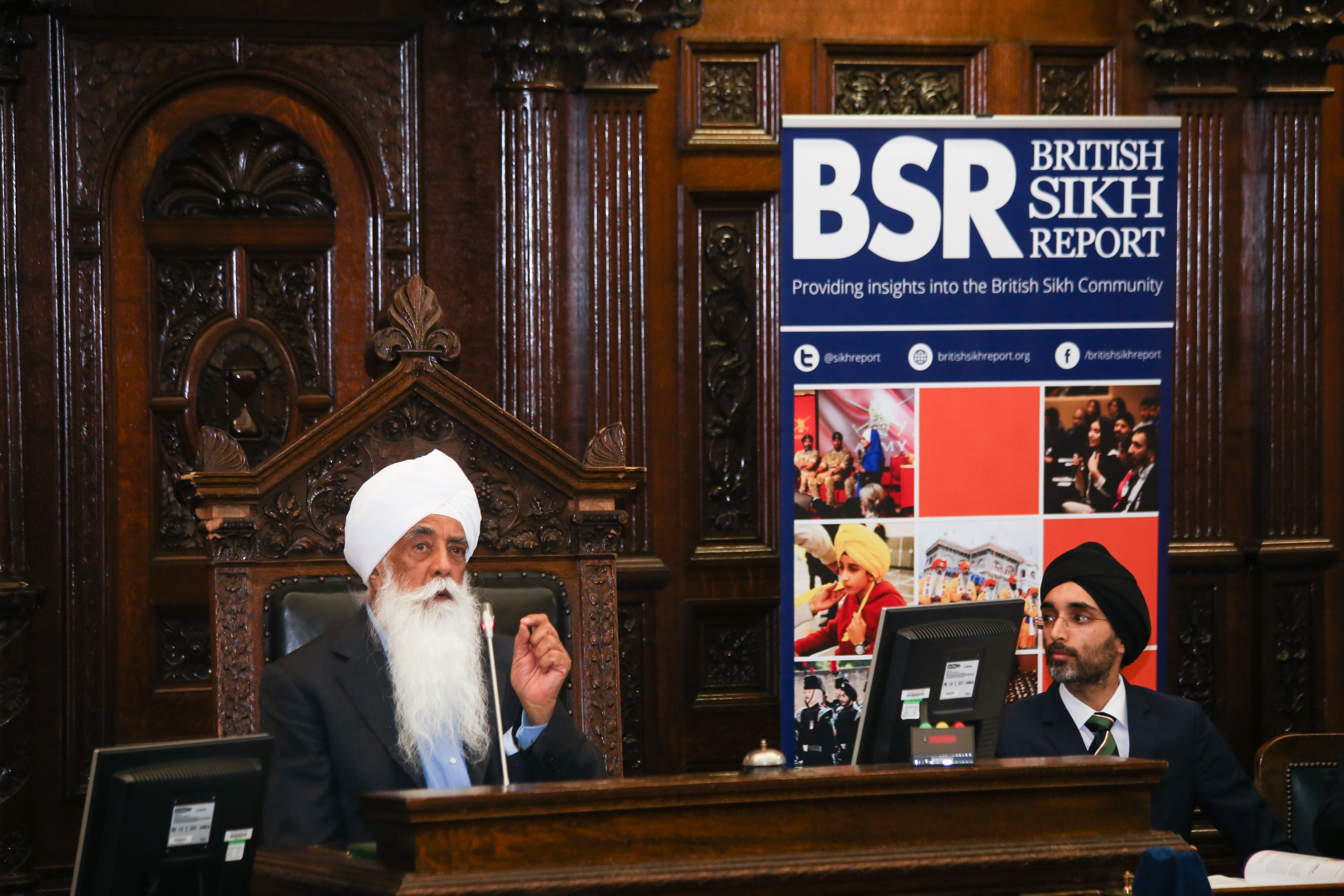
Bhai Sahib Bhai Mohinder Singh Ahluwalia speaking at the Midlands launch of the British Sikh Report 2018

- Balwant Kaur – founder and chairperson of Mata Nanki Foundation
- Daljit Singh Shergill – president of Guru Nanak Gurdwara Smethwick
- Harpal Kumar – chief executive of Cancer Research UK
- Imandeep Kaur – director of Impact Hub: Birmingham
- Mohinder Singh Ahluwalia (Bhai Sahib) – chairman of the Nishkam Group
- Nidar Singh Nihang – scholar and grandmaster of Shastar Vidya
- Ravi Singh – CEO of Khalsa Aid

== Film, drama and entertainment ==
- Aaron Thiara - actor
- Abdullah Afzal – comedian
- Adeel Akhtar – actor
- Ameet Chana – actor
- Amrit Maghera – professional model turned actress
- Archie Renaux – actor and model
- Art Malik – actor
- Asim Chaudhry - actor and comedian
- Balvinder Sopal - actor
- Chandeep Uppal – actor, best known for her critically acclaimed starring role as Meena Kumar in the film Anita and Me.
- Danny Bhoy – comedian
- Gurinder Chadha – film director
- Guz Khan – comedian
- Harnaam Kaur – model, anti-bullying activist, body positive activist
- Humza Arshad – comedian
- Jas Binag – actor/model
- Jassa Ahluwalia – actor and presenter
- Jay Shareef – comedian
- Jimi Mistry – actor
- Kulvinder Ghir – actor, comedian and writer
- Lena Kaur – actor, best known for her role as Leila Roy in Channel 4
- Mandy Takhar – actor
- Meera Syal – comedian
- Navin Chowdhry - actor
- Neelam Gill – known for her work with Burberry, Abercrombie & Fitch and appearing in Vogue
- Nitin Kundra – actor
- Nitin Sawhney – musician, producer and composer
- Paul Chowdhry – comedian and actor
- Parminder Nagra – actor
- Parvez Qadir – actor
- Perry Bhandal – film director, screenwriter
- Saeed Jaffrey – actor
- Sair Khan – actor
- Saira Choudhry – actor
- Saira Khan – television presenter
- Samir Bhamra – playwright, designer, producer, director
- Sanjeev Bhaskar – comedian
- Sanjeev Kohli – comedian
- Shabana Bakhsh – actor
- Shiv Jalota - actor
- Simon Rivers – English actor who played the role of Kevin Tyler in Doctors
- Stephen Uppal – actor, known for playing Ravi Roy in the long-running British soap Hollyoaks
- Tahirah Sharif – actor
- Zia Mohyeddin – actor

== Law and justice ==
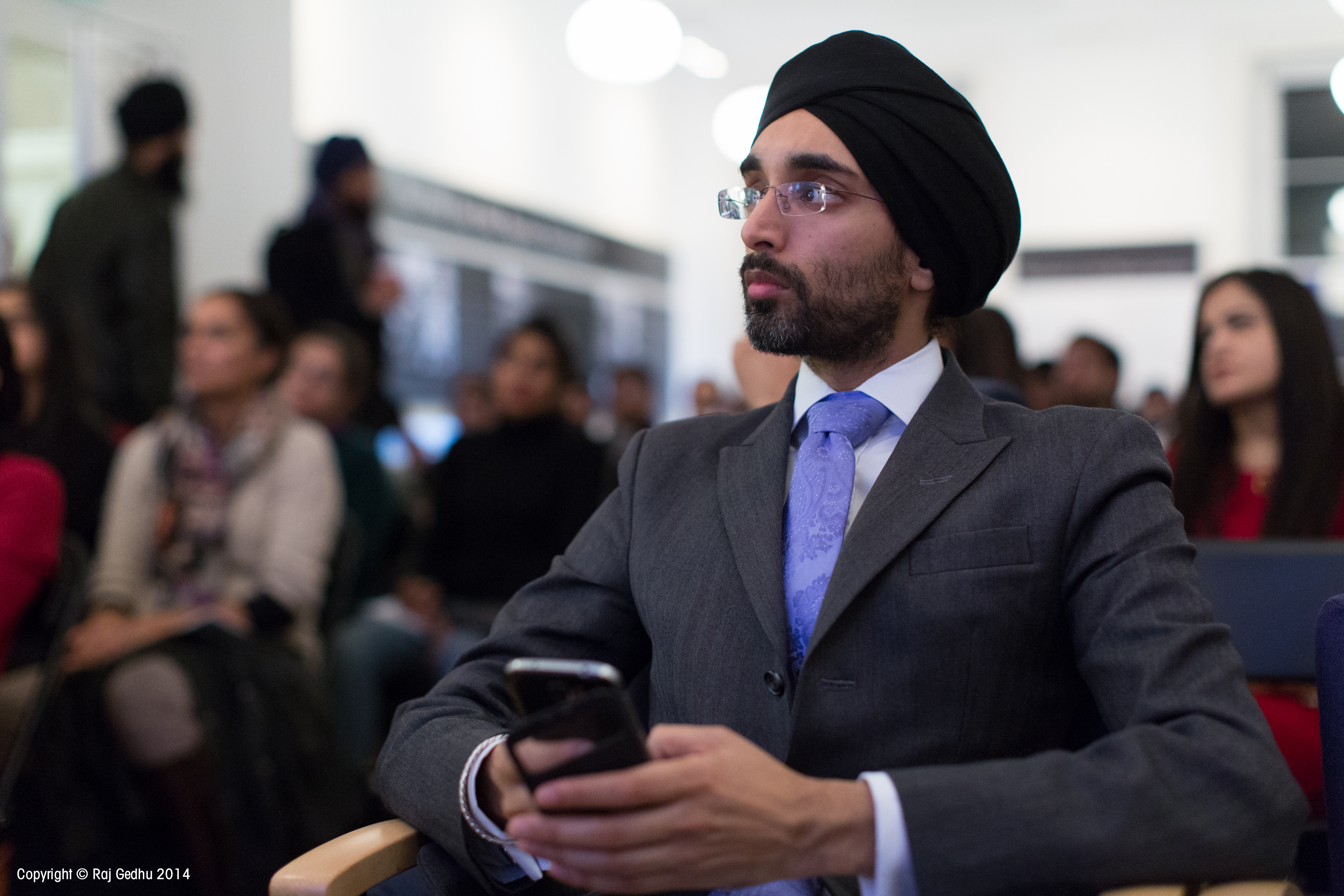
Jasvir Singh at a City Sikhs event in London

- Anup Singh Choudry – retired High Court judge
- Bobbie Cheema-Grubb (The Hon. Mrs Justice Cheema-Grubb) – judge of the Queen's Bench Division of the High Court of Justice of England and Wales
- Jasvir Singh – family law barrister
- Jo Sidhu QC – criminal law barrister
- Mota Singh QC – retired circuit judge England
- Nazir Afzal – lawyer
- Rabinder Singh (The Rt. Hon. Lord Justice) – English Court of Appeal judge, formerly a High Court judge of the Queen's Bench Division
- Tarique Ghaffur – former high ranking police officer

== Journalism, writers, creatives and media ==
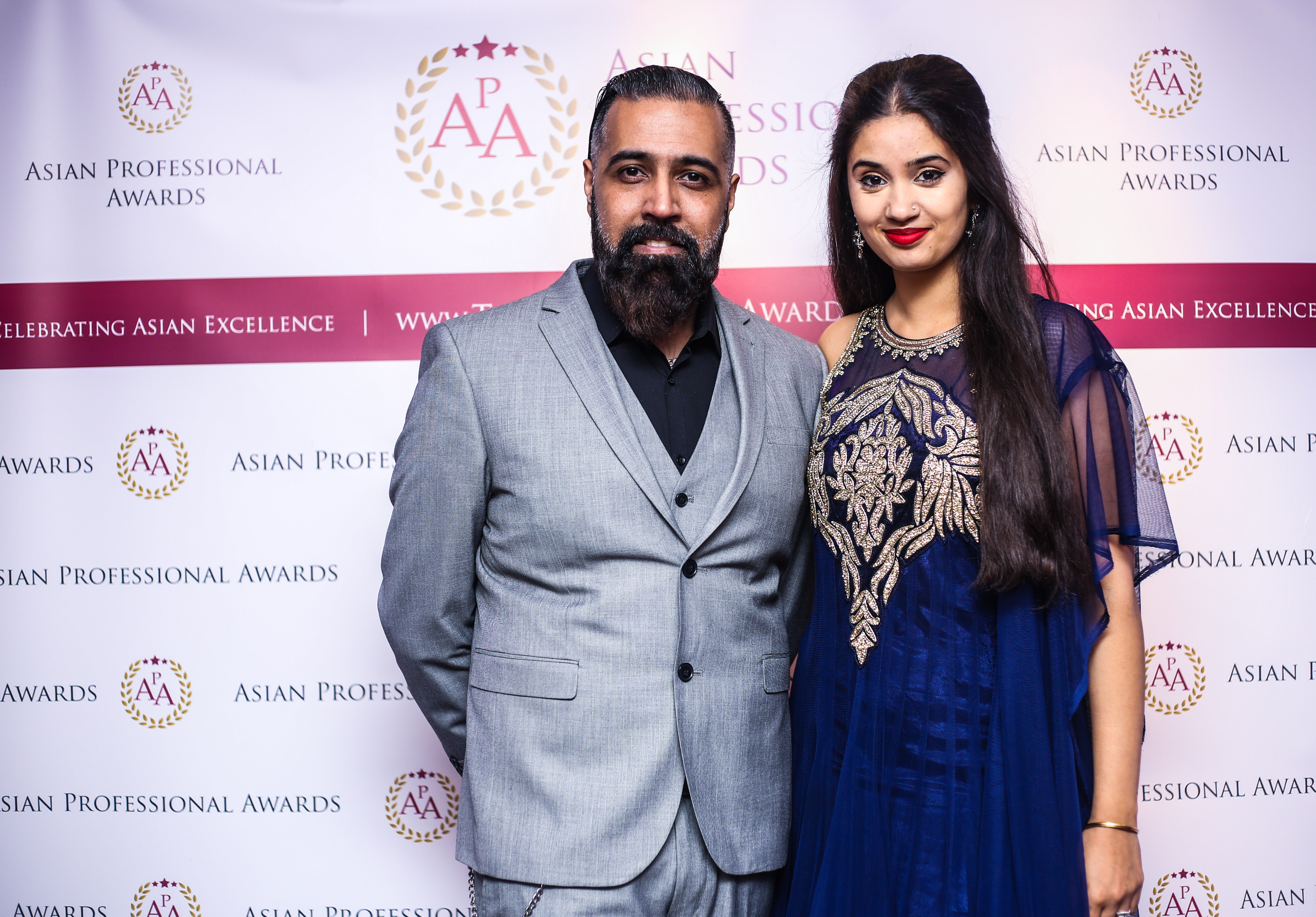
Sunny and Shay attending an awards ceremony in London

- Aatish Taseer – writer-journalist, son of Indian journalist Tavleen Singh
- Adil Ray – actor, comedian and radio and television presenter
- Atta Yaqub – model
- Anita Rani – radio and television presenter
- Chila Kumari Burman – artist
- Bobby Friction – DJ, television presenter and radio presenter
- Daljit Nagra – poet
- Gurpreet Kaur Bhatti – writer
- Hardeep Singh Kohli – radio and television presenter
- Hassan Ghani – Scottish broadcast journalist
- Imtiaz Dharke – poet, artist and documentary filmmaker
- Martin Bashir – journalist
- Mishal Husain – British news presenter
- Mo Dutta – television and radio presenter
- Mohsin Hamid – novelist, writer and brand consultant
- Moniza Alvi – poet and writer
- Nirpal Singh Dhaliwal – journalist and writer
- Omar Mansoor – designer
- Priya Kaur-Jones – newsreader
- Qaisra Shahraz – novelist, scriptwriter, college inspector, teacher trainer, education consultant
- Raman Mundair – poet, writer, artist and playwright
- Ranvir Singh – English television presenter and journalist
- Razia Iqbal – journalist employed by BBC News
- Rizwan Khan – broadcaster
- Sangita Myska – television presenter and journalist
- Sarfraz Manzoor – journalist, documentary maker, and broadcaster
- Sathnam Sanghera – British journalist and author
- Sonia Deol – English radio and television presenter
- Sunny Hundal – journalist, blogger and academic
- Sunny and Shay – husband and wife radio presenters
- Tariq Ali – writer, journalist
- Ziauddin Sardar – scholar, award-winning writer, cultural critic

== Music ==
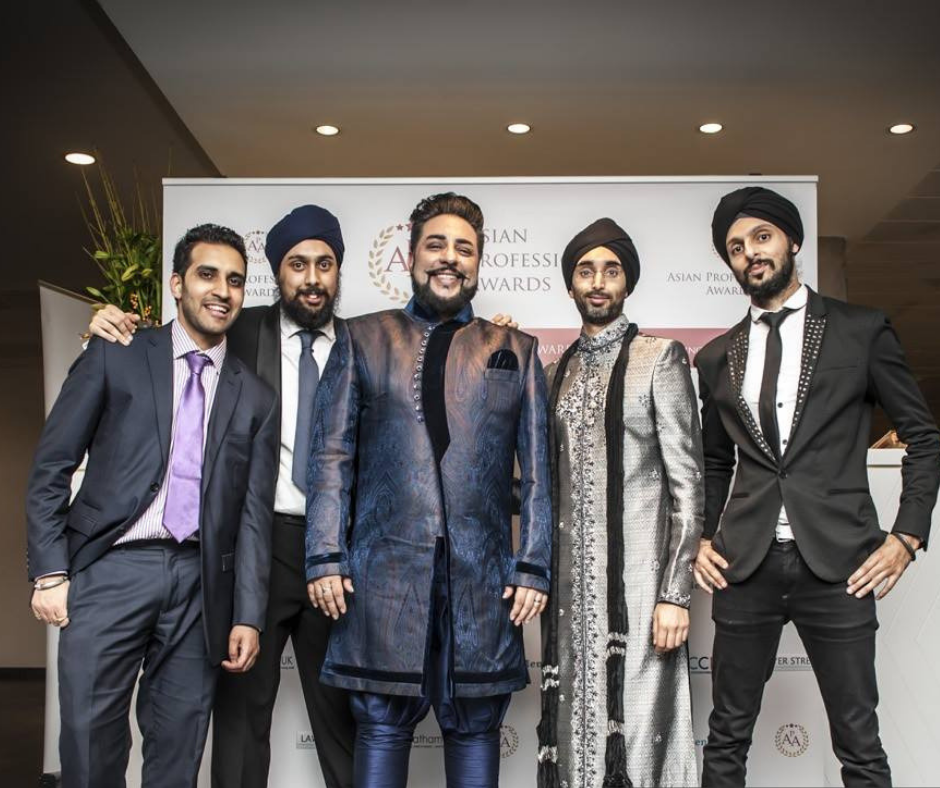
Bobby Friction at the Emirates Stadium in London

- Aman Hayer – bhangra producer and singer
- Bally Sagoo – record producer
- Channi Singh – bhangra musician, known as the "godfather" of bhangra in the West
- Diamond Duggal – music producer, DJ, songwriter and guitarist
- Dr Zeus – Punjabi singer and music producer
- Gurdeep Samra – music producer and DJ
- Hard Kaur – rapper and hip hop singer
- Indy Sagu – bhangra and hip hop musician
- Jas Mann – songwriter, musician, singer, record producer and film producer
- Jassi Sidhu – bhangra singer and the former lead singer of British Indian bhangra band B21
- Jay Sean – R&B artist
- Juggy D – bhangra, Punjabi music, R&B
- Malkit Singh – Punjabi bhangra]] singer
- Manj Musik – music composer, singer
- Manni Sandhu – music director
- Ms Scandalous – bhangra/rap artist
- Naughty Boy – rapper, musician and DJ
- Panjabi MC – rapper, musician and DJ
- Rishi Rich – music producer
- Silinder Pardesi – bhangra singer-songwriter, lyricist, and composer
- Steven Kapur - singer, known as Apache Indian
- Sukshinder Shinda – bhangra record producer and singer–songwriter
- Prof Surinder Singh Matharu – founder of the Raj Academy Conservatoire
- Surjit Khan – record producer, musician and singer-songwriter
- Tarsame Singh Saini – singer, composer and actor
- Talvin Singh – producer, composer and tabla player
- Tigerstyle – folkhop group
- Tjinder Singh – lead singer of British indie rock band Cornershop
- Zack Knight – singer-songwriter, music composer and producer
- Zayn Malik – singer

== Politics ==
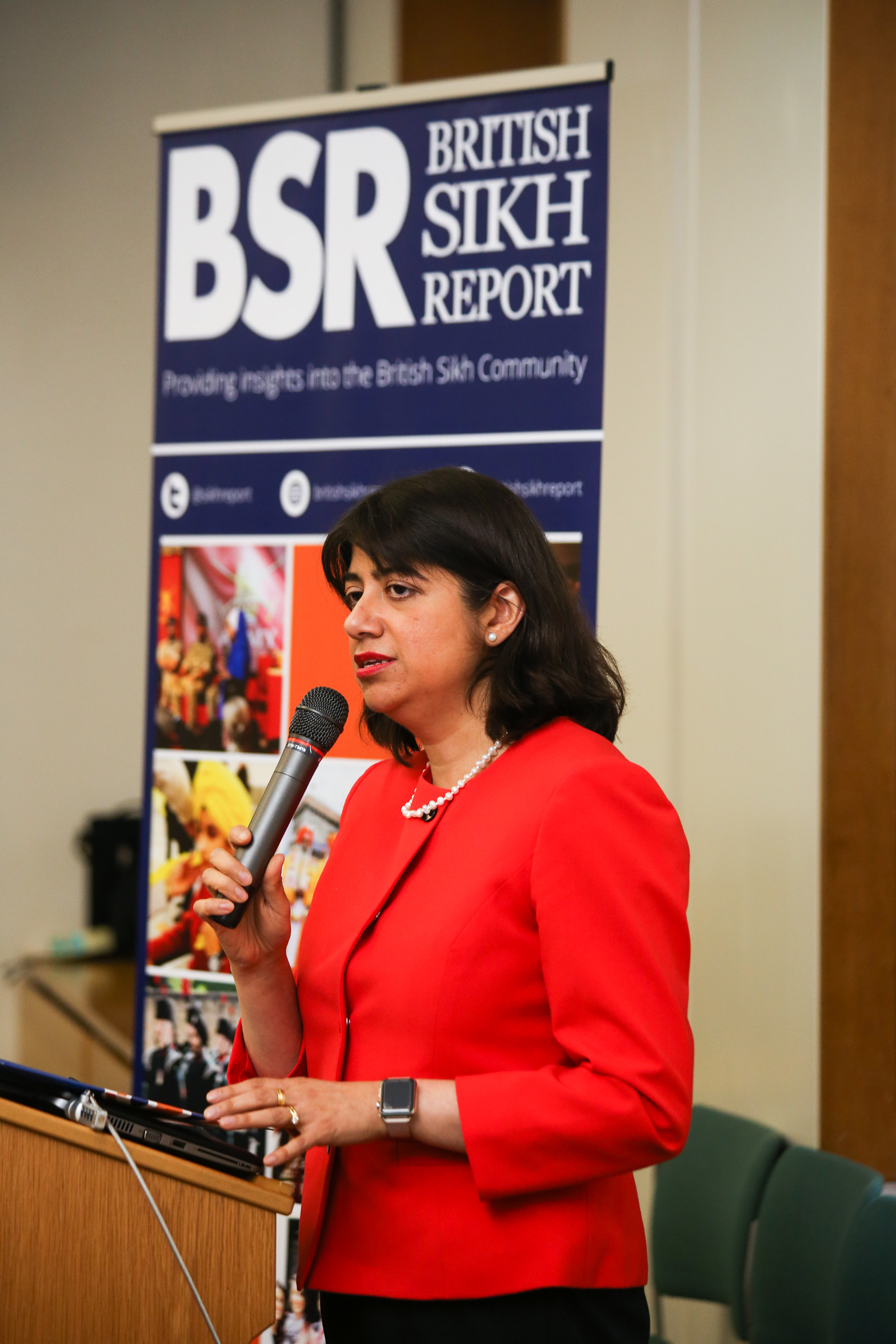
Labour MP Seema Malhotra speaking at the parliamentary launch of the British Sikh Report

- Atma Singh – policy advisor to the Mayor of London on Asian Affairs in the Greater London Authority, under Ken Livingstone
- Afzal Khan – British Labour Party politician who serves as a member of parliament for the Manchester Gorton constituency
- Anas Sarwar – Scottish Labour Party politician
- Bashir Ahmad – SNP Politician
- Bashir Khanbhai – former MEP for East of England and Conservative Party politician.
- Bashir Maan – Pakistani-Scottish politician, businessman, judge, community worker and writer
- Diljit Rana – member of the House of Lords
- Gurinder Josan – Labour party activist
- Hanzala Malik – Scottish Labour Party politician
- Humza Yousaf – SNP politician and current first Minister of Scotland
- Rishi Sunak – former Prime Minister of the United Kingdom
- Hardyal Dhindsa – Derbyshire police and crime commissioner
- Indarjit Singh (The Lord Singh of Wimbledon CBE) – member of House of Lords
- Marsha Singh – British Labour Party politician, Member of Parliament (MP) for Bradford West from 1997 to 2012
- Mohammad Sarwar – former Pakistani Senator
- Neena Gill – Member of the European Parliament for the West Midlands
- Nosheena Mobarik – life peer
- Onkar Sahota – Member of the London Assembly for Ealing and Hillingdon
- Parmjit Dhanda – British Labour Party politician, Member of Parliament (MP) for Gloucester from 2001 until the 2010 general election
- Parmjit Singh Gill – Member of Parliament for Leicester South from July 2004 to May 2005, he was the first ethnic-minority Liberal Democrat MP
- Paul Uppal – small business commissioner
- Piara Khabra – Labour Member of Parliament (MP) for Ealing Southall from 1992 until his death
- Preet Gill – Member of Parliament (MP) for Birmingham Edgbaston since the 2017 general election, first female British Sikh MP.
- Ranbir Singh Suri, Baron Suri – member of the House of Lords
- Sajid Javid – former Home Secretary
- Seema Malhotra – Labour MP for Feltham
- Shas Sheehan – life peer
- Sonika Nirwal – senior Ealing Southall constituency Labour politician representing the Greenford Broadway ward
- Tanmanjeet Singh Dhesi – British Labour Party politician, MP for Slough since 2017
- Virendra Sharma – Labour Party politician
- Yasmin Qureshi – Labour Party politician
- Zahida Manzoor – Conservative member of the House of Lords
- Chaman Lal - First British Indian Lord Mayor of Europe's largest council, Birmingham City Council.
- Ram Parkash Lakha - Former Lord Mayor of Coventry.
- Mohinder Kaur Midha - Former Mayor of the London Borough of Ealing.
- Bishan Dass - Elected as first British Asian Lord Mayor of Wolverhampton in 1986.

== Royalty and revolutionaries ==
- Frederick Duleep Singh – younger son of Duleep Singh, the last Maharaja of the Sikh Empire
- Maharaja Duleep Singh – last Maharaja of the Sikh Kingdom, exiled in 1849 during the British Raj and possibly the first permanent Sikh resident in England
- Princess Sophia Alexandra Duleep Singh – prominent suffragette and accredited nurse
- Udham Singh – Punjab revolutionary and freedom fighter belonging to the Ghadar Party

== Sports ==
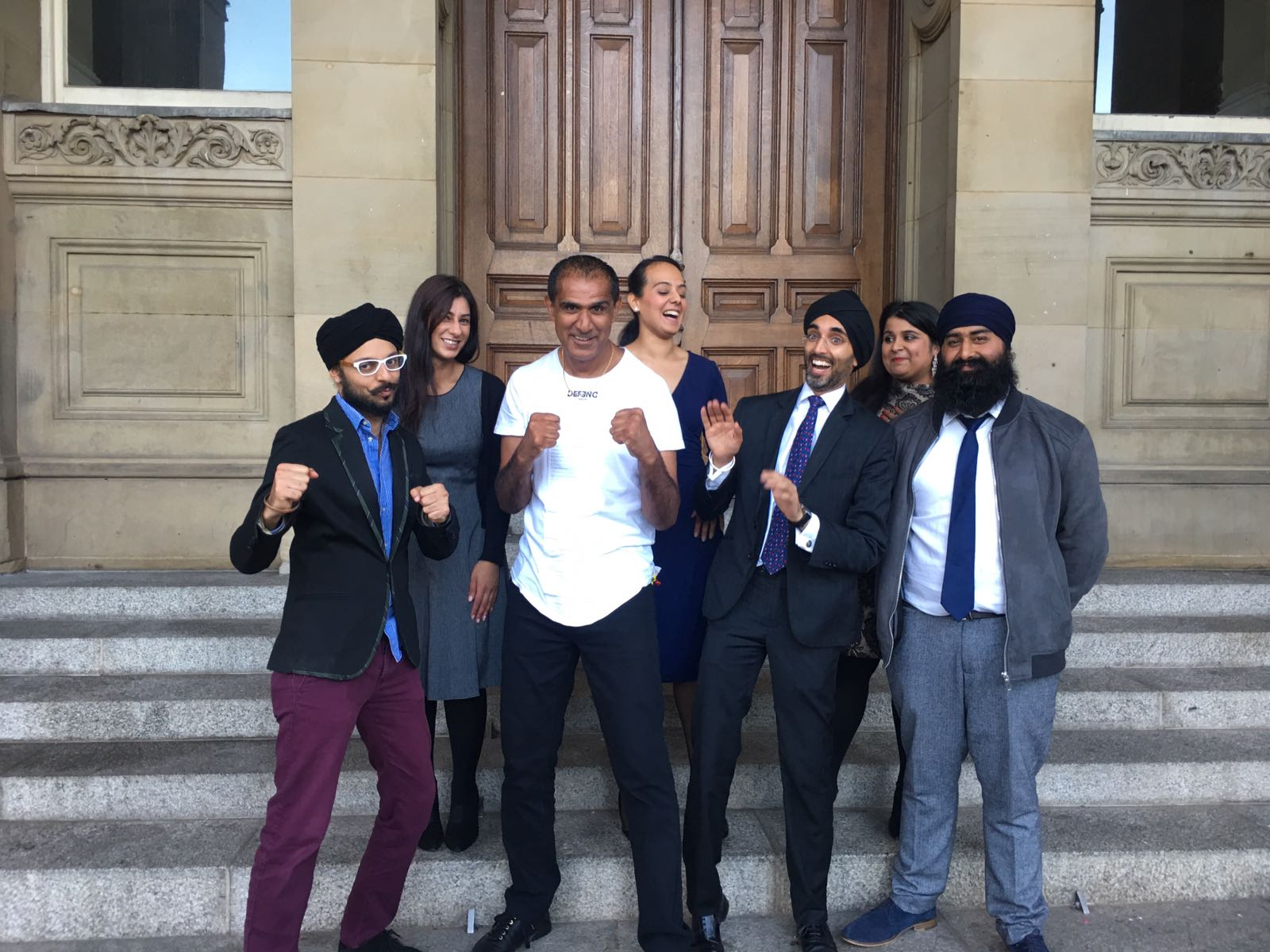
Kickboxer Kash Gill at the Birmingham Council House in 2017

- Ajmal Shahzad – cricketer
- Aman Dosanj – first British South Asian footballer to represent England at any level (under-16)
- Amir Khan – boxer
- Arjan Raikhy - footballer
- Asim Butt – cricketer
- Danny Batth – footballer and captain of Wolverhampton Wanderers F.C.
- Fauja Singh – British Sikh centenarian marathon runner
- Hamzah Sheeraz – boxer
- Harpal Singh – footballer
- Imran Jamshed – cricketer
- Imran Majid – pool player
- Kabir Ali – cricketer
- Kadeer Ali – cricketer
- Kamran Afzaal – cricketer
- Kash Gill – former kickboxing world champion
- Michael Chopra – footballer
- Mohammad Akhtar – cricketer
- Monty Panesar – England cricketer
- Ravi Bopara – England cricketer
- Saqlain Mushtaq – cricketer
- Shaftab Khalid – cricketer
- Usman Afzaal – cricketer
- Zafar Ansari – cricketer
- Zesh Rehman – footballer
- Zidane Iqbal – footballer

== Causes célèbres ==
- Jagtar Singh Johal
- Lakhvir Kaur Singh

== See also ==
- British Punjabis
- Punjabi diaspora
- British Indians
- List of British Sikhs
