= City Sikhs =

UK nonprofit organisation

- ਸਿਟੀ ਸਿੱਖ
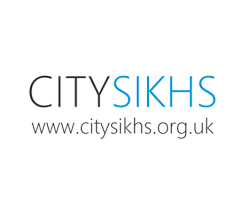
- "The City Sikhs mission is to create positive change within society and inspire people to be the best they can be."
- Named after: Professionals working in the City of London
- Founded: October 2010
- Founder: Jasvir Singh CBE; Param Singh MBE
- Founded at: London, England
- Type: Non-governmental organization
- VAT ID no.: None
- Legal status: Registered British charity
- Purpose: Faith and Interfaith work Professional networking Policy research Community cohesion Political engagement
- Headquarters: London, England
- Locations: Birmingham (Midlands); Manchester (North)
- Region served: United Kingdom
- Members: 10000 members and supporters
- Trustee Co-Chairman: Jasvir Singh CBE
- Trustee Co-Chairman: Param Singh MBE
- Volunteers: 40
- Website: www.citysikhs.org.uk
- Formerly called: City Sikhs Network

City Sikhs (formerly City Sikhs Network) (Punjabi: ਸਿਟੀ ਸਿੱਖ) is a nonprofit organisation, and a registered charity which describes itself as "A voice for progressive Sikhs". It promotes networking, education and volunteering amongst Sikh professionals and provides a platform for engagement with the British Sikh community.

== History ==
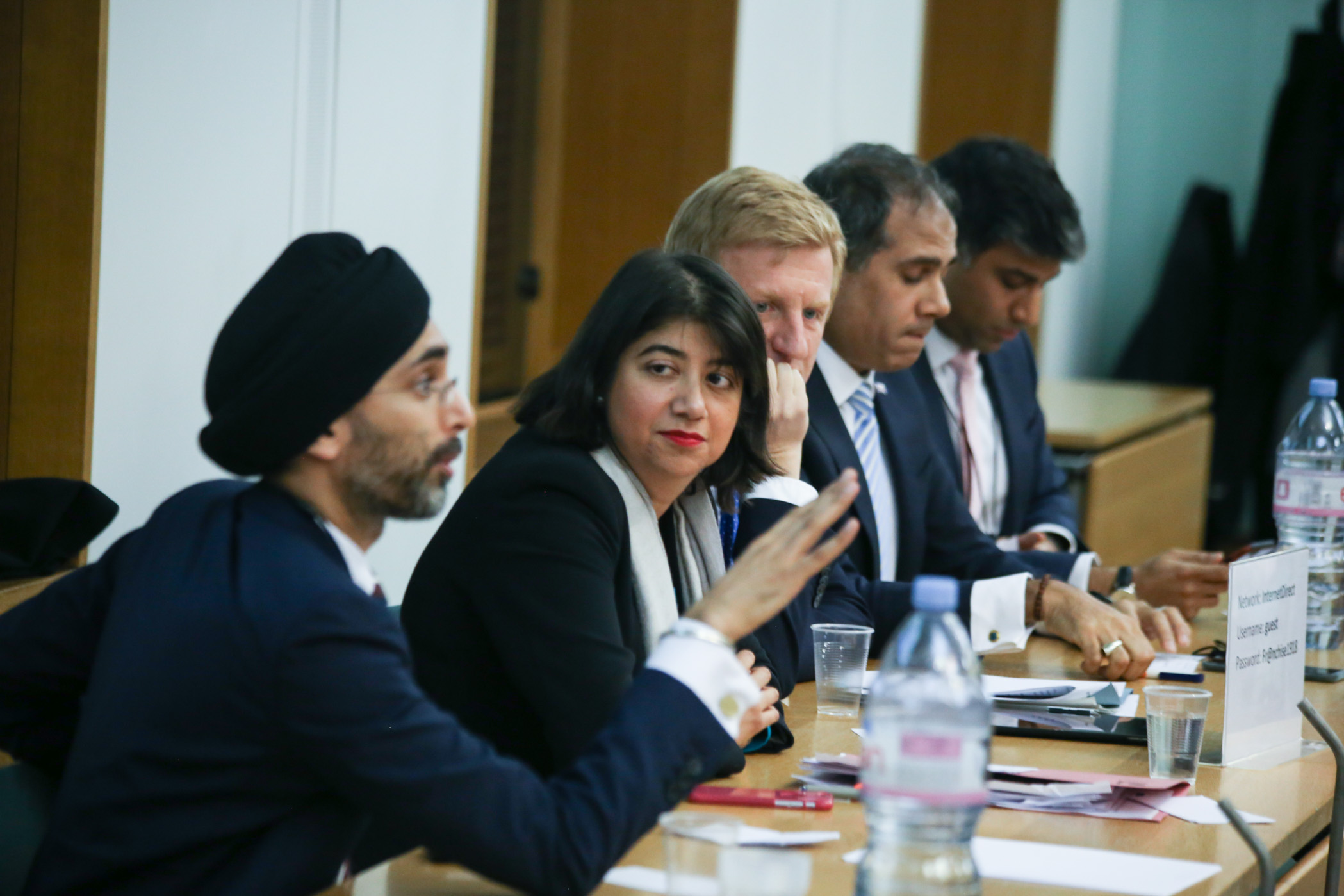
Jasvir Singh Chairing the City Sikhs Politics in the City 2018 in Parliament

City Sikhs was launched in London in October 2010 by a group of Sikh professionals. The idea for the organisation came about after the founder of City Sikhs, Param Singh became friends with Dhruv Patel OBE, the founder of the City Hindus Network through a leadership training programme they both attended. In 2018, the organisation had over 7,000 members and was the largest Sikh organisation in the UK and Europe.

City Sikhs is a member of the Faiths Forum and has worked with a variety of organisations including City Hindus Network, Deloitte Diversity Networks, National Sewa Day, the Faith and Belief Forum (formerly Three Faiths Forum), Limmud, the Islamic Society of Britain, and The Football Association

In 2021, Rita Chadha, who was the former Small Charities Coalition chief executive, was appointed as its first director.

== City Sikhs' work ==
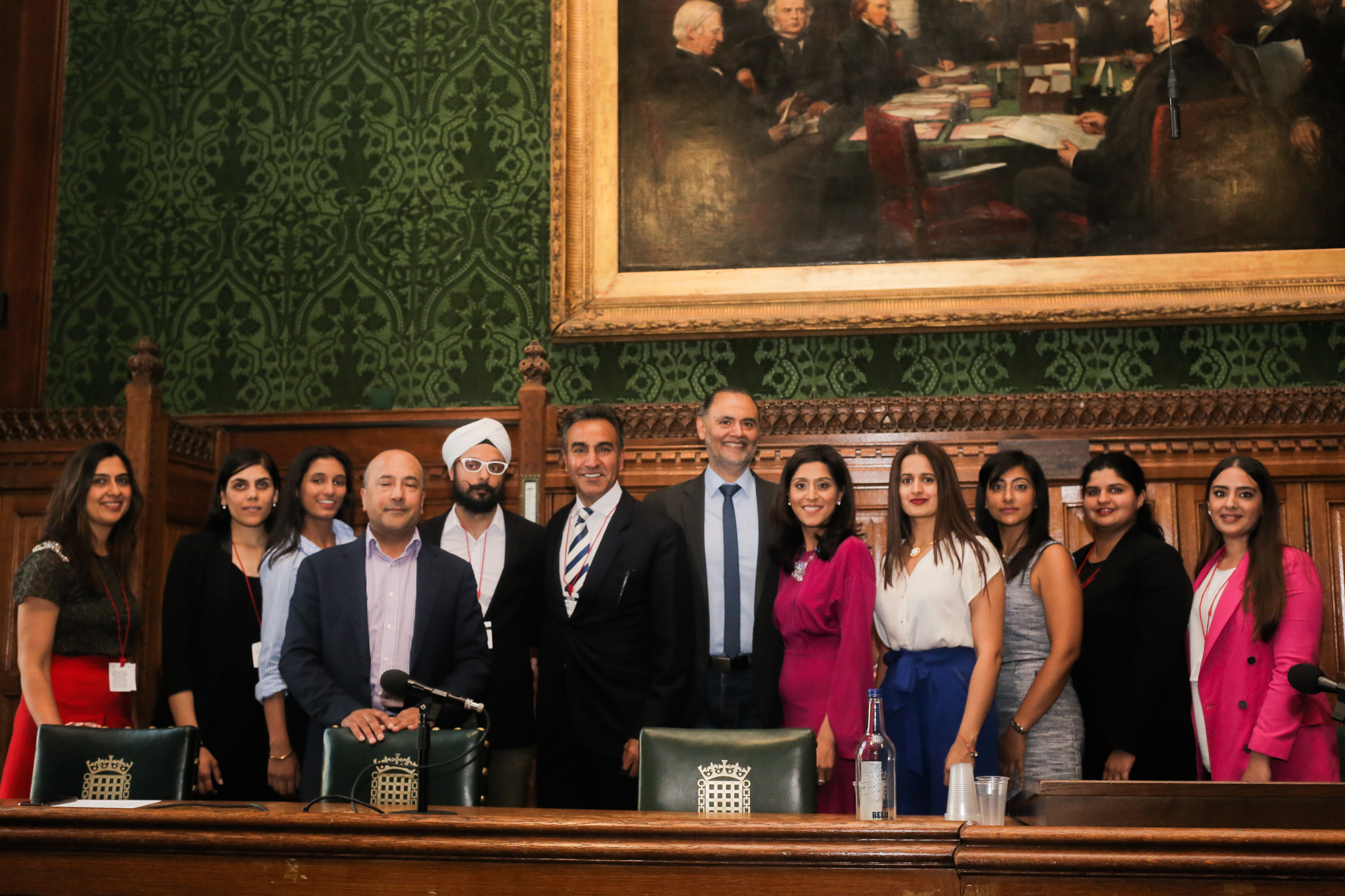
The City Sikhs annual Recipes for Success 2018 taking place in Parliament. Picture showing volunteers and the speakers.

Some of the events that City Sikhs has organised include:

- 17 August 2011: "Sikhs, the City and Success", hosted by Barclays Wealth
- 2 April 2012: "Mayoral Hustings in the City", hosted by Deloitte
- 17 October 2012: "Celebrating British Asian Sporting Success", hosted by Herbert Smith Freehills LLP
- 4 April 2013: "Recipes for Success", hosted by State Street Bank
- 31 July 2013: "Launch of the British Sikh Report", hosted by Ernst & Young
- 10 February 2014: "Women in Faith", co-hosted by St Paul's Cathedral
- 9 April 2015: "Hustings in the City", hosted by the Chartered Insurance Institute and co-organised with the City Hindus Network.
- "Recipes for Success", hosted by UBS Bank in 2014, Lloyds Bank in 2016, BDO in 2017 and Parliament in 2018.
- 15 April 2019: The Grand Trunk Project and Faiths Forum for London in partnership with City Sikhs, City Hindus Network and the Association of Muslim Lawyers held an event in Parliament to commemorate 100 years on since the Jallianwala Bagh Massacre.
- 22 July 2019: The Faiths Forum for London in partnership with City Sikhs organised the parliamentary launch of the first South Asian Heritage Month
- 29 July 2019: City Sikhs in partnership with the Indian High Commission organised a photo exhibition on the life and philosophy of Guru Nanak Dev Ji as part of his global 550th birth anniversary celebrations.

City Sikhs supports interfaith initiatives such as the St George's Day Declaration and CAASE. City Sikhs has also supported British Sikh projects such as the Warrior Saints book, the British Sikh Report, and the Khanda Poppy Project

In February, 2022 they also authored an open letter about religious freedom in collaboration with British South Indians and think tank, Bridge India in response to the move to ban head scarves in schools in Karnataka.

Members of City Sikhs have appeared on TV and radio and in print on a number of occasions to talk about Sikh or British Asian issues and are regular contributors to the BBC Asian Network and BBC1's The Big Questions.

== Awards and nominations ==
The City Sikhs team has been awarded a wide range of awards recognising both interfaith and community work, including:

- In the 2017 New Year Honours, a founding trustee Jasvir Singh, received an OBE for services to faith communities and social cohesion in the UK. He became the youngest Sikh to receive this award.
- In the 2018 New Year Honours, Onkardeep Singh, a founding trustee, received an MBE for services to faith communities and young people in the UK. He became the youngest person of South Asian heritage to receive this award.
- In November 2018, Trustee Param Singh received an 'Inspirational Individual' award at Faith and Belief Forum Community Awards presented by the Lord Lieutenant for Greater London, Sir Ken Olisa OBE for services to the various faith communities in London.
- In the 2019 New Year Honours, Param Singh, a founding trustee, received an MBE for services to charity.
- In July 2019, City Sikhs was given the "Community Initiative of the Year" award and the co-founder, Param Singh MBE, was named Man of the Year at the 7th British Indian Awards.
- In September 2019, Onkardeep Singh MBE, a founding member, was awarded the prestigious Asian Achievers Award for community service at the 19th Asian Achievers Awards at Grosvenor House by Air Chief Marshall Michael Wigston of the Royal Air Force.

== See also ==
- Sikhism in the United Kingdom
- Sikhism in England
- British Sikh Report
