= City Hindus Network =

- સિટી હિંદુઓ નેટવર્ક
- Founded: 2005
- Founder: Dhruv Patel CBE
- Founded at: London, England
- Type: non-governmental organization
- Legal status: Non profit organisation
- Purpose: Networking; Education; Spirituality; Charity
- Headquarters: London, England
- Region served: London
- Members: 5000
- Chair: Alpesh Patel OBE
- Chair Advisory Board: Lord Jitesh Gadhia
- Director: Dhruv Patel CBE
- Volunteers: 20
- Website: www.cityhindus.org

City Hindus Network (CHN) is a not-for-profit organisation created to promote networking, spirituality, education and charity amongst Hindu professionals. It was founded in 2005 by Dhruv Patel OBE, who was succeeded by entrepreneur Pratik Dattani. Its current Chair is Alpesh Patel OBE, who was appointed in December 2019. CHN is focused on building closer relationships between Hindu professionals working in the City of London.

== History ==
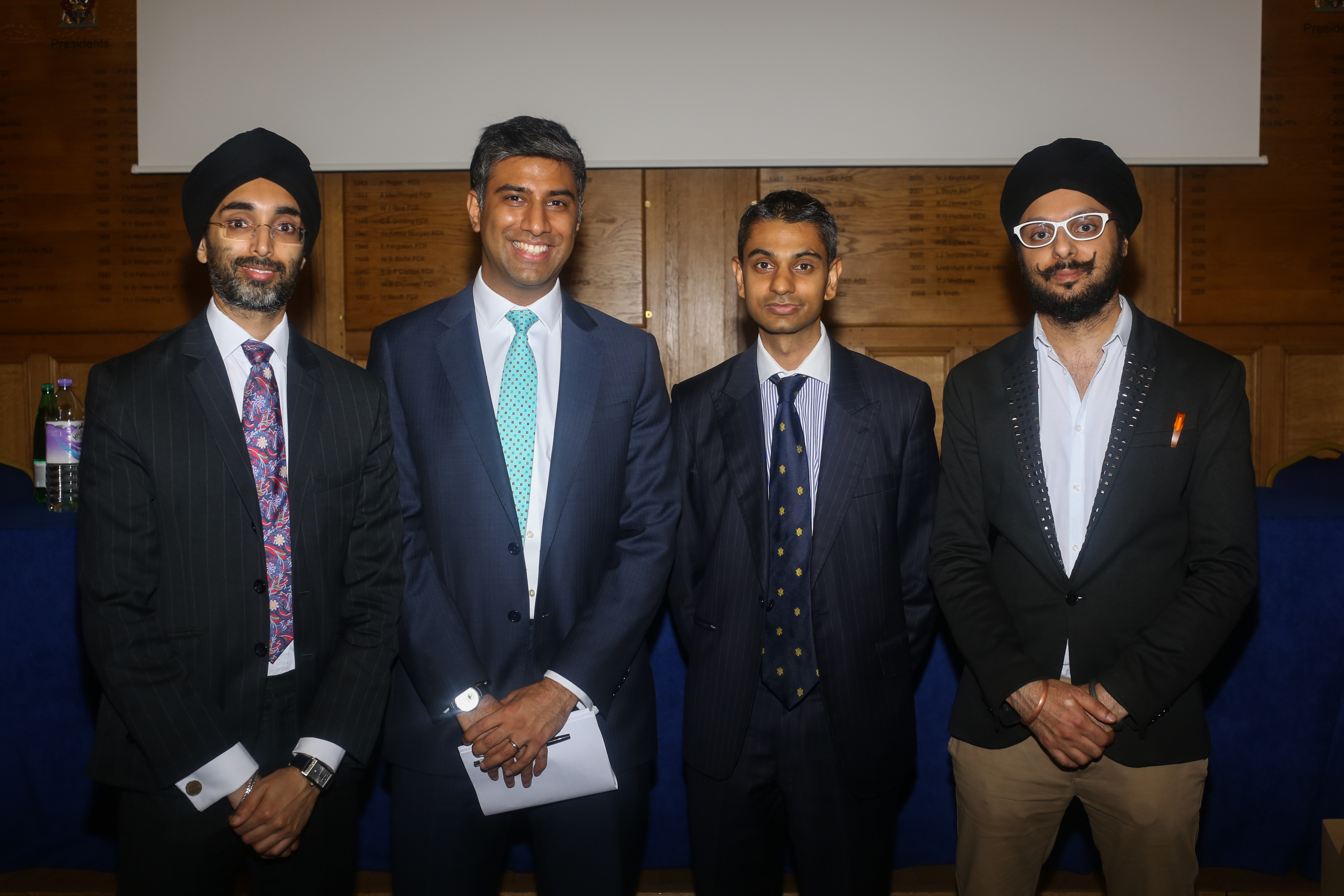
The founders and chairs for the City Hindus Network and City Sikhs at a joint Hindu-Sikh 'Hustings in the City' event in 2017. (From left to right Jasvir Singh OBE, Neel Patani, Dhruv Patel OBE, Param Singh MBE)

CHN's first major event was held by the then Mayor of London, Ken Livingstone, for the British Hindu community, at City Hall in London.

Since then, the CHN has organised networking events, talks on Hindu philosophy and spirituality, a mentoring scheme, charity and volunteering events for Hindu professionals, and taken part in community and government liaison on behalf of the Hindu community. Many of its events have been in conjunction with the accountancy and consulting firms and investment banks in London, alongside other Hindu community partners, such as Diwali in London, built relationships with the Metropolitan City Police and charities such as Odanadi, Women in Need, Joshua Playing Project and London Community Transport.

CHN has also works closely with other faith networks including City Sikhs to organise the largest hustings events in London. Recent collaboration events have included a quarterly DEI series focusing on Women in Business and Technology.

== Awards and nominations ==
- The founder of CHN, Dhruv Patel received an OBE in the 2018 Birthday Honours as a result of his community work through CHN and a CBE in the 2026 New Year Honours. He was elected the High Sheriff of London in 2026.
- The chairman of CHN, Alpesh Patel received an OBE in the 2020 Birthday Honours as a result of his services to the economy and international trade.
