= Three faiths =

Three faiths may refer to:

- The three largest Abrahamic religions: Judaism, Christianity, Islam
- Three teachings in Chinese philosophy (Chinese: 三教; pinyin: sān jiào): Confucianism, Taoism, and Chinese Buddhism

== See also ==
- Faith and Belief Forum, a British interfaith organisation formerly known as the Three Faiths Forum
