= Jagbir Jhutti Johal =

British professor of religion

Jagbir Jhutti Johal OBE
- Occupation: Professor
- Years active: 2002–present
- Organization: University of Birmingham

Jagbir Jhutti Johal OBE is a British professor of religion, author and media commentator.

== Career ==
Jagbir Jhutti Johal is professor of Sikh Studies in the department of theology and religion at the University of Birmingham.

She is a co-author of The changing nature of Sikh activism research paper looking at second generation Sikh activism published by the UK government in 2019 and also has been a contributor to the UKs ‘New Settlement’ for Religion and Belief which produced the Living with Difference report.

Jagbir is also regularly featured on the BBC Radio 4 Thought for the Day sharing views on Sikhism and contemporary issues.

She is a steering group member on the UK Freedom of Religion or Belief Forum and in 2022 was appointed to the Panel of Experts on Freedom of Religion or Belief by the OSCE (Organisation for Security and Cooperation in Europe)/ODIHR (Office for Democratic Institutions and Human Rights).

In 2022, she was appointed to the Race Equality Foundation Board.

== Awards ==
She was awarded an OBE in the 2019 Queen's New Honours List for services to Higher Education, Faith Communities and to the Voluntary Sector

== Selected publications ==
- Impact of 'cost-of-living ‘tsunami’ on the Sikh community, published within the British Sikh Report (2022)
- Jhutti-Johal, Jagbir (2019). Racialisation, Islamophobia and Mistaken Identity: The Sikh Experience. London: Routledge.
- Mental Health -The Sikh Dharam (Faith) And Punjabi Cultural Perspectives, published within the British Sikh Report (2019)
- Chapter on Sikh Dharma in Howard, Veena R. and Sharma, Rita D. (2017). Dharma: The Hindu, Buddhist, Jain and Sikh Traditions of India. London: I.B Tauris.
- Chapter on How Parties to Sikh Marriages use and are influenced by the Norms of their religion and culture when engaging with mediation in Maclean, M. and Eeklaar, John (2013). Managing Family Justice in Diverse Societies. Oxford: Hart Publishing.
- Chapter on Sikhism and mental illness: negotiating competing cultures in Cave, D. and Sachs Norris, Rebecca (2012). Modern Science and the Construction of Religious Meaning. Netherlands: Brill.
- Chapter on Sikh Women’s Voices in Jakobsh, Doris (2010). Sikhism and Women. India: Oxford University Press.
