= South Asian Heritage Month =

Awareness month in the United Kingdom

- Also called: SAHM
- Observed by: United Kingdom
- Type: National
- Significance: Celebration of the culture and heritage of South Asia including, South Asian history and its links to diaspora communities
- Date: 1 to 31 July (UK)
- Duration: 1 month
- Frequency: Annual
- First time: 2020; 6 years ago

South Asian Heritage Month is the name given to the month-long celebration in the South Asian diaspora to celebrate the heritage of people with roots in the South Asian countries of India, Pakistan, Bangladesh, Sri Lanka, Nepal, Bhutan, and the Maldives.

It runs from 1 to 31 July each year.

Between 2020 and 2025, it ran from 18 July to 17 August each year. The co-founders of South Asian Heritage Month are Jasvir Singh CBE and Dr Binita Kane.

== South Asian Heritage Month in the UK ==
The South Asian community in the UK organised the concept launch of the first South Asian Heritage Month event in July 2019 at the House of Commons. The concept launch was a collaboration between City Sikhs, Faiths Forum for London, The Grand Trunk Project and The Partition Commemoration Campaign. The first South Asian Heritage Month took place in 2020

== Dates for South Asian Heritage Month ==
South Asian Heritage Month runs from 1 to 31 July and seeks to commemorate, mark and celebrate South Asian cultures, histories, particularly the intertwined histories of the UK and South Asian communities and how South Asian cultures are present throughout the UK.

SAHM originally took place across two Western calendar months (July and August), which was unlike most commemoration months. The reason for this was that it respected the traditions of the South Asian solar calendar and 18 July to 17 August contains several significant dates:

- 18 July: the Indian Independence Act of 1947 gained royal assent
- 26 July: Maldives Independence Day
- 8 August: Bhutan Independence Day
- 14 August: Pakistani Independence Day
- 15 August: Indian Independence Day
- 17 August: Partition Commemoration Day or the date that the Radcliffe Line was published in 1947, setting out where the border between India, West Pakistan and East Pakistan (now Bangladesh) would be

That period also very nearly coincided with the South Asian month of Shravana, which is the main monsoon month when the region's habitat undergoes renewal.

After the end of South Asian Heritage Month 2025, it was announced that it would run from 1 to 31 July from 2026 onwards in order "to make the campaign more accessible".

== Origins in Ottawa, Canada ==
The first Indo-Caribbean Canadian (OSSICC) was formed primarily to celebrate the upcoming 150th anniversary of the arrival of Indians to Guyana in 1988. OSSICC continued to celebrate Indo-Caribbean Heritage Day until the year 2000, with interest coming mainly from Indo-Caribbeans.

In April 1997, the Indo-Trinidadian Canadian Association (ITCA) was formed and immediately started Indian Arrival Day celebrations that year. Also that year, community activist Asha Maharaj organized a display of Indian artifacts, the Trinidad and Tobago Association of Ottawa held its first celebration, and the Caribbean East Indian Cultural Organization headed by radio host Richard Aziz organized an Indian Arrival celebration in Toronto.

By 1998, ITCA had decided to celebrate the event as Indian Arrival and Heritage Day, and held a huge show/display/dance at the Etobicoke Olympium. It was never an Indo-Caribbean for ITCA but always Indian, meaning all people with roots in the Indian subcontinent.

== Indian Arrival and Heritage Month in Canada ==
Since 1997, ITCA and later the Council for Indian Arrival and Heritage Month had decided not to make this an Indo-Caribbean event. They realized that Indo-Caribbeans were only about 10 percent of the South Asians in Toronto, and if they confined Indian Arrival to Indo-Caribbeans, it would remain forever a marginal event.

By 1999, ITCA had moved to celebrate the month of May as Indian Arrival and Heritage Month. At this stage, only ITCA and OSSICC were organizing events.

By the year 2000, a Council for Indian Arrival and Heritage Month was in place, composed of people from ITCA, OSSICC, the Guyanese group GEAC, the Hamilton group CICA and several individuals.

== Becoming Asian Heritage Month in Canada ==
When Indian Arrival and Heritage Month were launched at the Scarborough Civic Centre in 2001, the keynote speaker was Raminder Gill, at the time the South Asian Member of the Ontario Parliament.

Since May 2002, it has been known as Asian Heritage Month, and it incorporates waves of migration from East Asia, Southern Asia, Western, Central and Southeast Asia.
