= Surinder Singh Matharu =

Professor Surinder Singh
- ਸੁਰਿੰਦਰ ਸਿੰਘ ਮਠਾਰੂ
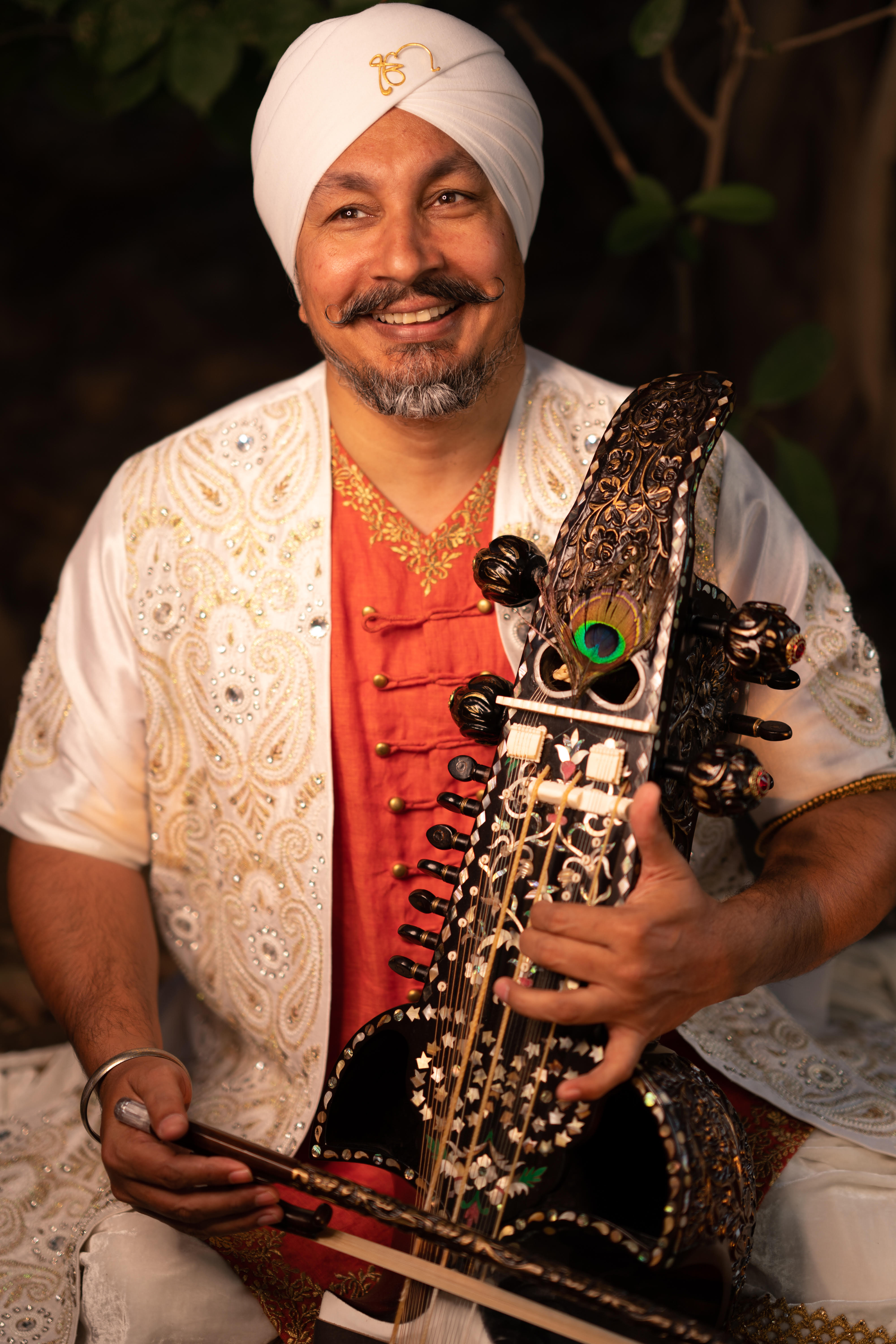
- Born: 1969 (age 56–57); Kapurthala
- Education: Economics, Music
- Alma mater: Guru Nanak Dev University
- Occupations: Musicologist, Naad Yogi, Scholar
- Years active: 1994–present
- Known for: Reviving Traditional Sikh Music and Naad Yoga
- Notable work: Mere Mun (2001), Anhad – Beyond Sound (2005), Partaal – Rhythms of Life (2008), Mantr – The Spiritual Solution (2013), Patsahi Dasvee - A Tribute to the King of my Soul (2013), Vaar Asa – Wisdom of Life (2014)
- Board member of: Raj Academy Conservatoire, Naad Yoga Council

Professor Surinder Singh Matharu (Punjabi: ਸੁਰਿੰਦਰ ਸਿੰਘ ਮਠਾਰੂ) (born 1969 in Kapurthala, India) is a British scholar of Indian music, philosophy, and naad yoga.

== Career ==
In 1994 in London, Prof. Surinder Singh founded the Raj Academy of Asian Music, which later became the non-profit organisation now known as Raj Academy Conservatoire. The Academy is an international institution and it quickly became one of the foremost schools for the study and practice of Sikh Music and Gurmat Sangeet ('music of Guru’s wisdom') of the Sikh musical tradition, teaching the art of playing ancient musical instruments of India including the Rabab, Taus, Saranghi, Dilruba, Saranda and Jori. He is also a founding member of Naad Yoga Council, which was founded in 2008.

He has taught Sikh Music and Naad Yoga in various places throughout the world including the UK, Canada, USA, Germany, Spain, France, and India, with over 3000 students around the world.

In 2006 Surinder Singh was awarded the status of Professor of Musicology at Thames Valley University (now University of West London). He taught degree courses at the university in Sikh Music, Naad Yoga and Classical Indian Music until 2012. In 2017, he launched the first multi-award winning documentary on Sikh Music called "Sikh Musical Heritage: The Untold Story".

== Early life ==
Prof. Surinder Singh was born and brought up in India and like many Sikhs hails from an Indian military family. In his younger years he would spend time with Yogis, Sadhus and Spiritual people. His early childhood was strongly influenced by Indian classical music, which he practised from the age of nine. His earliest teachers were Mahant Ajit Singh for musicology and Gyani Najar Singh for rhythm. During his teenage years Surinder Singh had the great privilege of studying singing, composition and musicology under the Guru- Shishya Parampara (intensive personal training under a master) with Pandit Kharayti Lal Tahim from the Delhi Gharana. His musical training was continued in England under Surjit Singh Aulakh, a senior student of Pandit Ram Narayan Ji.

In 1988, aged 19, Surinder Singh gained a BA in Economics at NJSA College, Kapurthala. A year later he graduated with an MA in Classical Indian Music at APJ College of Fine Arts, Jalandhar, followed by an MPhil in Classical Indian Music at Guru Nanak Dev University, Amritsar.

== Awards ==
Matharu received the title of professor whilst working for the Thames Valley University developing the first ever, globally recognised, degree in Sikh Music.
