= Karamjit Singh (electoral commissioner) =

British public servant (born 1950)

Karamjit Sukhminder Singh CBE (born 1950) is a British public servant. He was a member of the United Kingdom's Electoral Commission from 2001 to 2010, and the Social Fund Commissioner for Great Britain from 2009 to 2013 and for Northern Ireland from 2009 to 2015. He has been Chairman of the University Hospitals of Leicester NHS Trust since 2014

Before, he was the Assistant County Clerk (Urban Policies) for the Leicestershire County Council from 1984 to 1987. In 1990, he received a Harkness Fellowship to study the relations of urban institutions with their local communities in the United States. He has also been appointed to the Civil Service Commission, Judicial Studies Board, the Police Complaints Authority, the Parole Board and Employment Tribunals Panel. On 6 February 2007, Singh accepted a three-year appointment as an Independent Non-Executive Board Member of the Government Office for the West Midlands with the lead role for equality and diversity.

In the 2000 New Year Honours, Singh was appointed Commander of the Order of the British Empire (CBE) for services to the administration of justice.
