= Kash Gill =

British professional kickboxer (born 1966)

Personal information
- Nickname: The Flash
- Nationality: British
- Born: Kashmir Singh Gill; 2 July 1966 (age 60) Handsworth, Birmingham, England
- Height: 6 ft 3 in (1.91 m)
- Weight: 75 kg (11.8 st; 165 lb)

Boxing career

Boxing record
- Total fights: 100
- Wins: 84
- Win by KO: 43
- Losses: 16
- Draws: 1

Kashmir Singh Gill (Punjabi: ਕਸ਼ਮੀਰ ਸਿੰਘ ਗਿੱਲ, born 2 July 1966) popularly known as Kash "The Flash" Gill, is a retired British professional kickboxer who is a former four-time world champion.

Gill became a world champion in kickboxing at the age of 21. He formally retired from fighting in 2002. In 1991, he won the World Kickboxing Association (WKA) light middleweight and super welterweight full contact titles. The following year he won the WKA middleweight championship. He was the International Sport Karate Association freestyle champion of 1993.

== Biography ==
Born in 1966 as Kashmir Gill, he is an alumnus of Christ Church, Oxford where he studied biochemistry. Gill discovered kickboxing at the age of 14 when he saw a demo in a local park went down for a trial session and fell in love with the sport.

His speed and athletic ability as well as his flashy showmanship soon earned him the nickname 'The Flash'. By 1984, having earned his black belt, Gill at the age of 18, had entered and won his first competition in a three-round contest in full-contact karate.

He won a number of world titles and in 1986 he won a gold medal at the World PKA Amateur Full Contact Championships. He collected his first Professional world title, the WKA Junior Middleweight in 1991 when he also won the World full contact Karate championships. In the two consecutive years following, he went on to win the WKA World Middleweight kickboxing title and the ISKA World Light Middleweight title.

== Comeback ==
In December 2011, Gill fought former world kickboxing champion Don "The Dragon" Wilson in a mixed martial arts cage match in Kazakhstan. The bout was originally billed as an exhibition, but Wilson, 57, was awarded the decision at the end of the match.

== See also ==
- List of male kickboxers
