= Bibi Balwant Kaur =

British Sikh leader

Bibi Balwant Kaur, MBE
- Born: 10 May 1915; Village Soos, Punjab
- Died: 21 March 2009 (aged 93); Wales, United Kingdom
- Other names: Bibi Ji
- Known for: Charity

Bibi Balwant Kaur (Punjabi: ਬਿਬੀ ਬਲਵੰਤ ਕੌਰ, 10 May 1915, in Soos, Punjab – 21 March 2009), also known as Bibi Balwant Kaur Soor or Bibi ji, was the founder and chairperson of Mata Nanki Foundation, located at Rookery Road, Birmingham, the head of the Bebe Nanaki movement and the Mata Nanaki movement.

In 2000, Bibi Balwant Kaur was awarded the MBE (Member of the Most Excellent Order of the British Empire) by Queen Elizabeth for dedicating her life to charitable causes. In 2007, she won the Sikh Women's Alliance Award for her "lifetime work in the service of worldwide humanity."
