= Imandeep Kaur =

British social and civil activist and businesswoman (born 1985)

- Born: 8 October 1985 (age 41); Birmingham, England
- Occupation: Director of Civic Square

Imandeep "Immy" Kaur (born 8 October 1985) is a British social and civil activist and businesswoman from Solihull. She was the director of Impact Hub Birmingham and is currently the co-founder and director of Civic Square.

== Early life and education ==
Kaur was born in Birmingham, England to parents of Indian origin. Her family originates from Punjab, India.

Kaur was educated at The Solihull School. On her first day at school, Kaur couldn't speak any English. In 2004, she enrolled at the University of Cardiff and graduated with a BSc in physiology in 2007, achieving an Upper Second Class classification. In 2011, Kaur graduated from University of Birmingham, International Development Department, with a MSc in International Development.

== Career ==
In 2012, Kaur interned for a year with Christian youth charity The Feast as a part of their Fellowship with the Tony Blair Faith Foundation.

Between 2015 and 2019, Kaur was a founding co-director of Impact Hub Birmingham, a collaborative working space and social enterprise in Digbeth, used for building entrepreneurial communities. The hub was established after Kaur and her co-founders created a Kickstarter crowd funder which raised £65,095 from 586 backers, exceeding its £50,000 target.

In 2020, Kaur became co-founder and director of Civic Square, a civic infrastructure project built on the ethos of Impact Hub Birmingham and committed to investing in local communities and neighbourhoods.

She was the director of Project 00, a collaborative studio of architects, strategic designers, social scientists, economists and urban designers and is curator for TEDxBrum.

In January 2020, Kaur backed the West Midlands Design Charter, a vision for the future for design and planning across the region launched by Mayor of the West Midlands Andy Street and the West Midlands Combined Authority.

Kaur also sits on the board of directors for BOM, a Birmingham-based centre for art, technology and science "dedicated to creative innovation with purpose".

Kaur has contributed to the Huffington Post, where she is described as a "Sikh interfaith activist".

== Activism ==
Kaur has campaigned for the BBC to promote more diversity, engage better with ethnic minorities and invest more in Birmingham.

She has spoken out against austerity cuts and closures of public libraries and youth centres.

== Politics ==
In June 2017, Kaur joined a rally in support of Jeremy Corbyn and expressed her support for the Labour Party in the 2017 United Kingdom General Election.

In August 2019, Kaur spoke on a panel at left-wing political festival The World Transformed in Birmingham, billed alongside Jon Lansman, Keir Milburn, Huda Elmi and Grace Blakeley. The workshop and majority of the multi-day festival was held at Impact Hub Birmingham.

In December 2019, Kaur told Sky News her 2019 United Kingdom General Election voting priorities were "immigration and Brexit" and that she was against the Home Office hostile environment policy, public cuts and the privatisation of the National Health Service.

== Personal life ==
She identifies as Sikh.

== Awards ==
In April 2016, Kaur won the 2016 Asian Business Women of the Year award.

In April 2016, Kaur was listed as one of the most influential people within the world of business lobbying within the West Midlands.

In September 2017, Kaur was named in The Innovation 50 report published by law firm Mills & Reeve, in collaboration with TheBusinessDesk.com.

In July 2019, Kaur received an honorary doctorate from the University of Aston.

Kaur was a finalist in the English Women's Awards 2019, selected for the 'Woman of Influence' category.
