= Dhruv Patel (politician) =

English businessperson and politician

Dhruv Patel CBE
- Born: Dhruv Prashant Patel; 1983 (age 42–43); London, England
- Education: Imperial College, London
- Occupations: Businessman, politician
- Awards: OBE (2018)

Dhruv Prashant Patel CBE (born 1984, London) is a British Indian businessman, community organiser and politician, who serves as a City Common Councilman since 2013.

In 2018 HM Birthday Honours, Patel was appointed OBE.

== Career ==
Patel has been returned as a Common Councilman of the City of London Corporation since 2013, and was appointed Chairman of the City Community and Children's Services in 2015.

In 2019, he became the first Indian-origin Chairman of the City Bridge Trust, London's largest independent grant-making charity. Prior to serving as a Common Councilman he was an executive at Barclays Capital.

Patel is the founder of the City Hindus Network, an organisation based in the City of London which was set up in 2005 representing over 3,000 Hindu professionals. In 2007 he organised the first Hindu community engagement event at City Hall with support from then-Mayor Ken Livingstone to celebrate the contribution of Britain's half a million Hindus to the UK economy, culture and social life.

Patel organised the first celebration of the Hindu festival of Diwali at Mansion House, the official residence of the Lord Mayor of London in 2015.

In 2020 Patel supported the founding of the London Communities Response Fund to help provide money for organisations facing immediate financial pressures as a result of COVID-19.

As the chair of the High Premium Group (HPG) a consortium of Lloyd's Names have clubbed together in 2023 to provide Funds At Lloyd’s (FAL) with approximately £5 million of underwriting capacity in three Lloyd’s Syndicates.

In 2026 he was elected as the High Sheriff of Greater London.

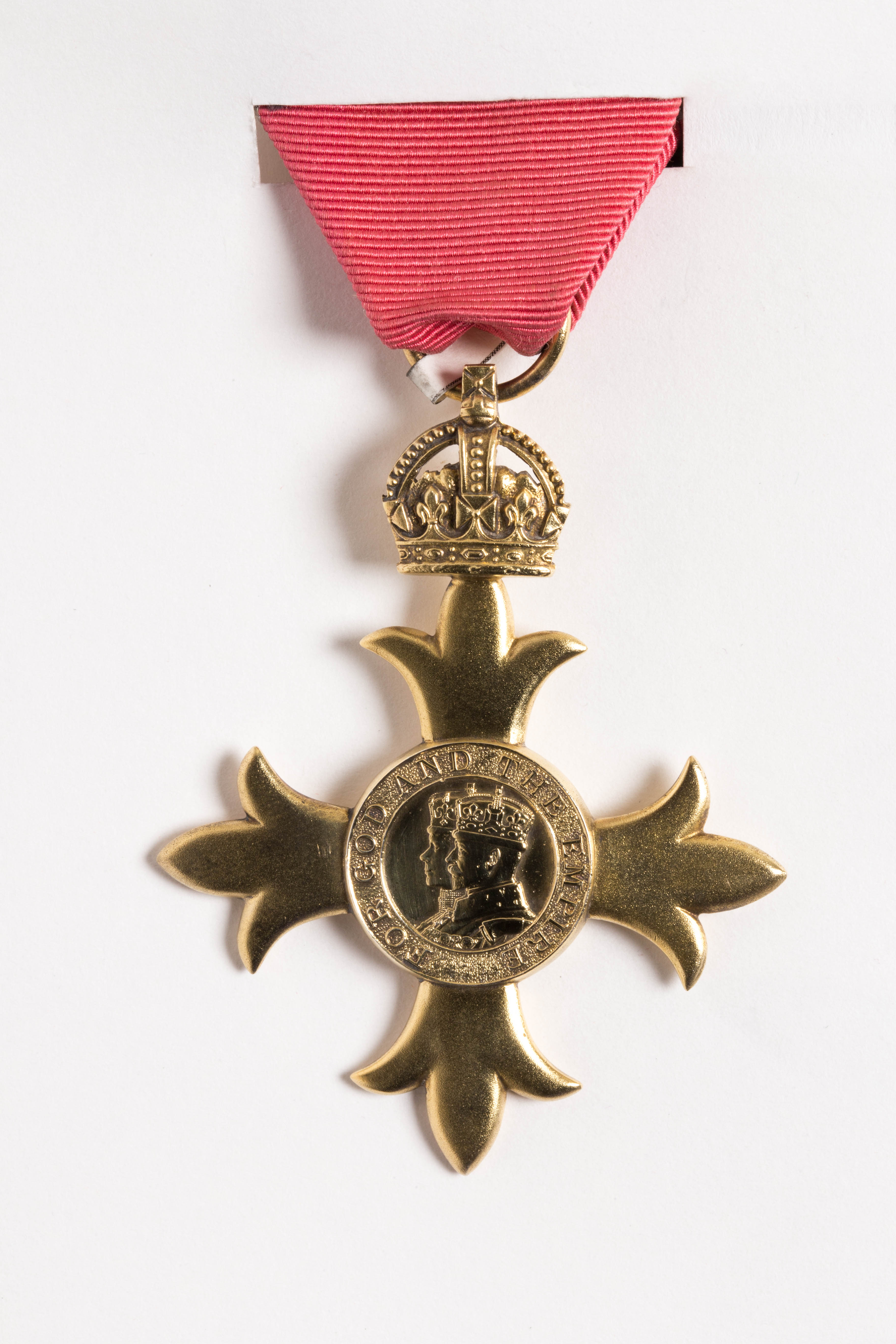

== Honours ==
In the 2018 Queen's Birthday Honours, Patel was appointed an Officer of the Order of the British Empire for services to the British Hindu community and promoting social cohesion.

== Personal life ==
He is married to Anita Patel and they have two children together, Roma and Aryav. The couple was featured in the annual Asian power couples list in 2019.
