= Param Singh (consultant) =

British consultant

Param Singh MBE FRSA
- ਪਰਮ ਸਿੰਘ
- Born: London
- Education: Mechanical Engineering
- Alma mater: University of Sheffield
- Occupation: Business Consultant
- Years active: 2010–present
- Notable work: Member of several organisations
- Television: The Ranganation, 4thought.tv, Take Me Out
- Relatives: Sardar Professor Sundar Singh, The Hon Shri S.S. Ahluwalia
- Awards: Awarded 'Man of the Year' (2019), Awarded 'Inspirational Individual' (2018)
- Honours: Member of the Most Excellent Order of the British Empire MBE (2019)

Paramdeep Singh Bhatia MBE (Punjabi: ਪਰਮ ਸਿੰਘ) is a British business and technology consultant, charity founder and reality television personality. He has worked for various companies including the Ford Motor Company, Rolls-Royce, Sainsbury's, Accenture and MetLife. Singh was appointed a Member of the Order of the British Empire (MBE) in the 2019 New Year Honours for voluntary services to minority communities.

== Career ==
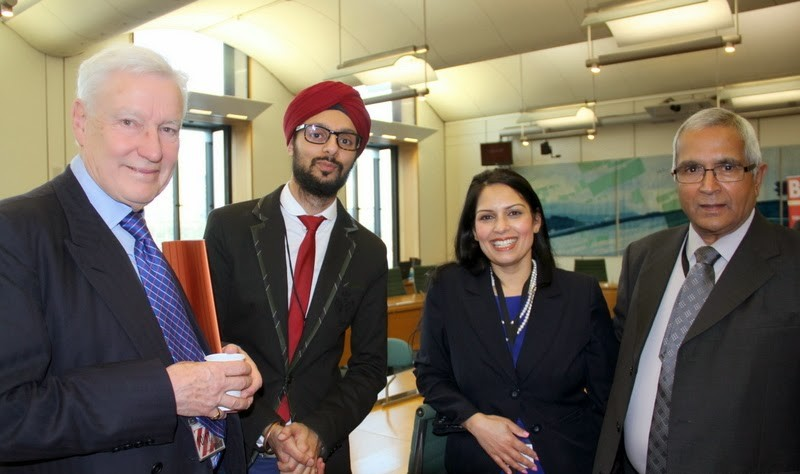
Left to Right: The Lord Crathorne KCVO, Param Singh MBE, Rt Hon Priti Patel MP, The Rt Hon. the Lord Dholakia OBE DL

Singh has worked with internet startup companies since 2011 after launching an online 'find a lawyer' website, similar to TripAdvisor.

He is a founding member and spokesperson for City Sikhs which is a charity representing the interests of British Sikh professionals.

From 2019, Singh appeared as “Wheeler Dealer” across five seasons of the BBC Two comedy series The Ranganation, a topical entertainment show hosted by comedian Romesh Ranganathan. The programme featured a recurring cast of 25 members of the public who provided commentary on current affairs alongside celebrity guests and the host. Singh was one of the original and longest-serving contributors, regularly appearing on-screen and participating in weekly discussions on social and political issues. His on-screen nickname, “Wheeler Dealer,” became a recognisable part of the show’s format. The BBC has released multiple clips highlighting his commentary under this persona.

== Awards and recognition ==
- Jul 2019: Awarded ''Man of the Year'' at the British Indian Awards.
- Jan 2019: Appointed a Member of the Most Excellent Order of the British Empire (MBE) and received the honour at Buckingham Palace from Queen Elizabeth II.
- Nov 2018: Honoured with an 'Inspiring Individual' award at the Faith and Belief Community Awards from the Lord-Lieutenant of Greater London, Sir Kenneth Olisa OBE.

== Personal life ==
In 2019, Singh claimed he and his friends of Asian heritage were barred from entering several clubs in Vienna - Prater Dome, Baku Lounge and Loco Bar - while on holiday due to alleged racial discrimination. Martin Fahmy, the manager of Baku Lounge, denied the claims, highlighting the racial diversity of his staff and other venue patrons. Fahmy citing a lack of reservation as the reason the group were turned away.

In 2013, Singh became the first Sikh to appear on UK dating game show Take Me Out. In 2018, he appeared on the same show's 10th anniversary special.

== Family ==
Singh's grandfather Professor Sunder Singh was a graduate from the University of Sheffield.

== Views ==
Singh appears in the media to talk about the experience of British Asians in dating, diversity and interfaith related matters.

== See also ==
- List of British Sikhs
