= British Sikh Report =

Annual report on British Sikhs

- ਬ੍ਰਿਟਿਸ਼ ਸਿੱਖ ਰਿਪੋਰਟ
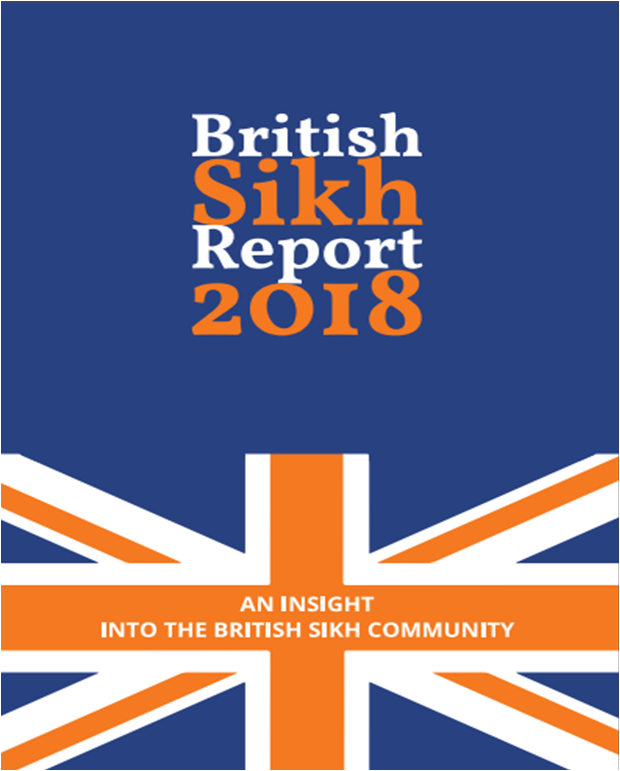
- Providing insights into the British Sikh community
- Abbreviation: BSR
- Founded: 2012
- Founder: Jasvir Singh CBE; Param Singh MBE
- Founded at: London, England
- Type: non-governmental organization
- Legal status: British charity
- Purpose: Providing insights into the British Sikh community
- Headquarters: London, England
- Locations: Edinburgh (Scotland), Cardiff (Wales), Manchester (North); Birmingham (Midlands)
- Region served: United Kingdom
- Product: Annual report created about British Sikhs
- Services: Publishing an annual report on British Sikhs
- Chair: Jasvir Singh CBE
- Editor of the BSR: Jagdev Singh Virdee MBE
- Academic Advisor: Professor Jagbir Jhutti-Johal OBE
- Volunteers: 10
- Website: www.britishsikhreport.org

The British Sikh Report, (Punjabi: ਬ੍ਰਿਟਿਸ਼ ਸਿੱਖ ਰਿਪੋਰਟ) also known as the BSR, is an annual report launched in Parliament every year about Sikhs in the United Kingdom. The report looks at the views of Sikhs living in the UK and provides this information e.g. the government, non-governmental organisations, companies and other groups. It is one of the largest projects to regularly study the needs and wants of Sikhs anywhere in the world.

== History ==
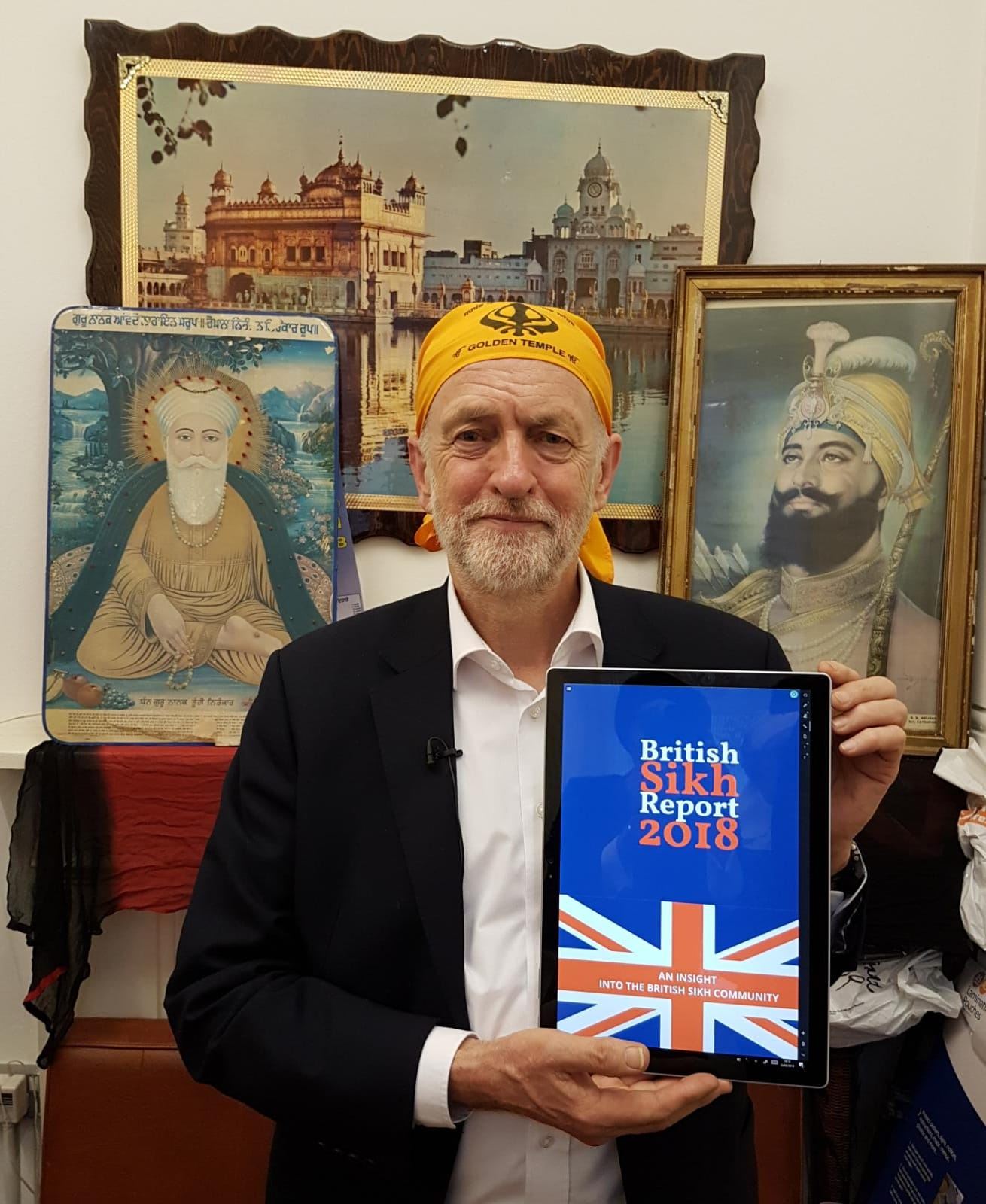
Rt Hon Jeremy Corbyn MP being presented with the British Sikh Report 2018

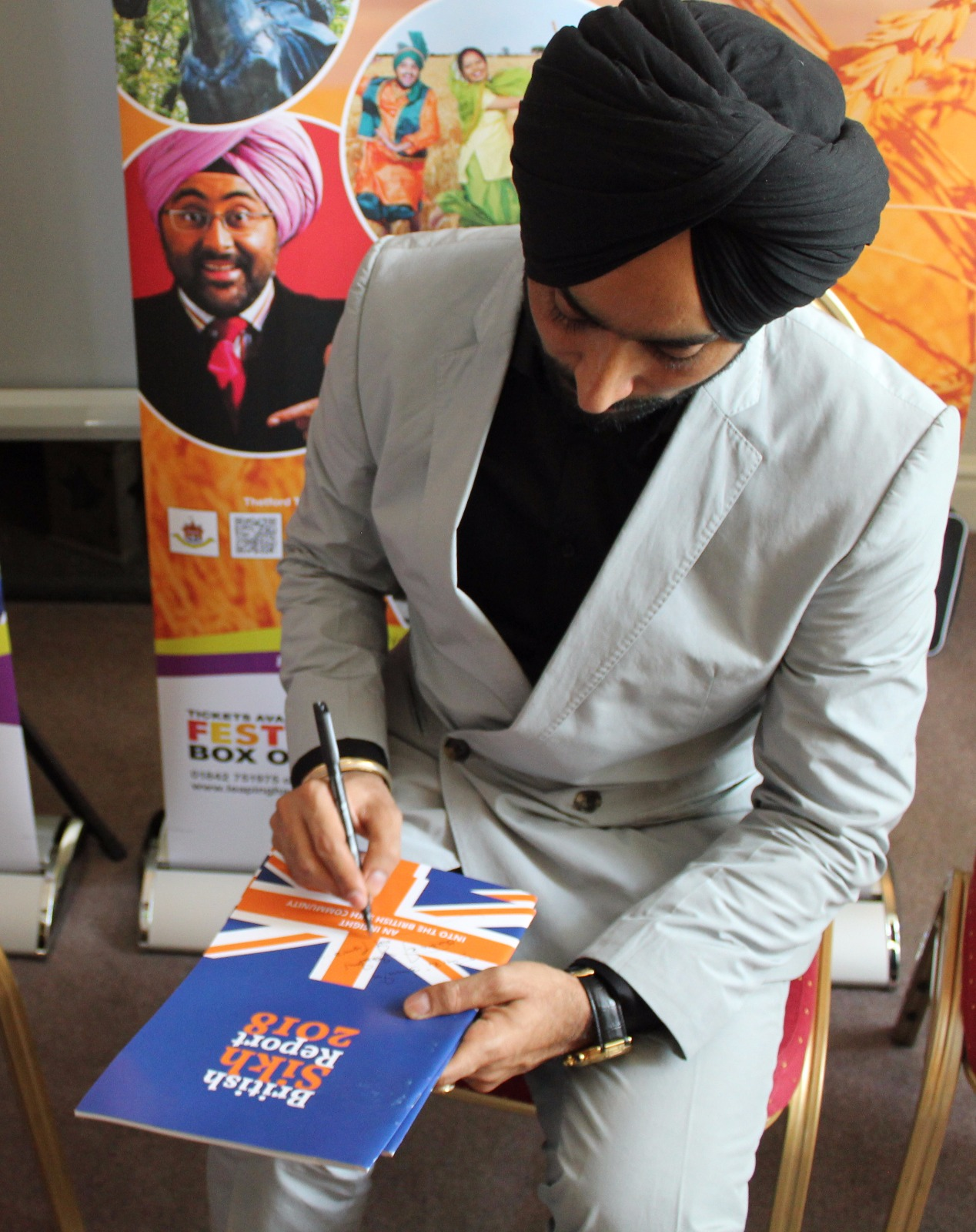
Satinder Sartaaj the famous singer of Sufi songs signing a copy of the British Sikh Report

The BSR was founded by Jasvir Singh CBE in 2012 and is created annually by a team of research analysts, lawyers, academics, social workers, senior consultants and managers who work on the BSR on a voluntary basis. The Editor of the report is Jagdev Singh Virdee MBE, who is a British statistician. The report takes approximately 500 hours and costs £30,000 to create every year. The purpose of BSR is to "identify the needs and wants of the 432,000 strong Sikh population in the UK." The BSR is "one of the few large-scale surveys undertaken of Britain's Sikhs" and it is one of the largest projects to study this group of people in the country.

BSR is launched annually in Parliament. The report has been quoted in the British Parliament, referred to in pieces of research and white papers relating to Sikhs or faith in general, and used by public bodies, the corporate sector and third sector groups. The report is also meant to help other non-Sikh organisations better work with Sikhs in the UK. The BSR fills a gap in information relating to modern Sikhs in Britain.

In 2019, the report was used to support the first Sikh National History and Awareness Month.

== Content ==
The report, which focuses on the views of Sikhs living in Britain, is organized into several sections, including an introduction, review of relevant literature, research methodology and then goes into the selected feedback areas. The report also addresses recommendations for areas in people's lives that need improvement. BSR has focused on different subjects over the last few years. In 2018, the focus of the report was mental health which has subsequently led to a new generation of Sikhs more open to discussions and leading the dialogue regarding mental health within the British Sikh Community.

In the first year, the respondents were selected through an online study, which the BSR acknowledged as being skewed towards those who have internet access.

== Awards and nominations ==
The British Sikh Report team has been awarded a wide range of awards recognising their community work, including:

- In the 2019 New Year Honours, Dr Jagbir Jhutti-Johal, the academic advisor to the British Sikh Report and senior lecturer in Sikh studies at the University of Birmingham received an OBE for services to higher education, faith communities and the voluntary sector.
- In the 2018 Birthday Honours, Jagdev Singh Virdee, the editor of the British Sikh Report, received an MBE for services to statistics and the Sikh community in the UK. He is the most senior expert in official statistics amongst Sikhs globally.
- In the 2018 New Year Honours, Onkardeep Singh, a founding trustee, received an MBE for services to faith communities and young people in the UK. He became the youngest person of South Asian heritage to receive this award.
- In the 2017 New Year Honours the chairman, Jasvir Singh, received an OBE for services to faith communities and social cohesion in the UK. He became the youngest Sikh to receive this award. In the 2023 New Year Honours, he received a CBE for services to charity, faith communities and social cohesion.

== See also ==
- List of British Sikhs
- Sikhism in the United Kingdom
- Sikhism in England
