= Jasvir Singh (barrister) =

British family law barrister, media commentator and social activist

Jasvir Singh CBE FRSA
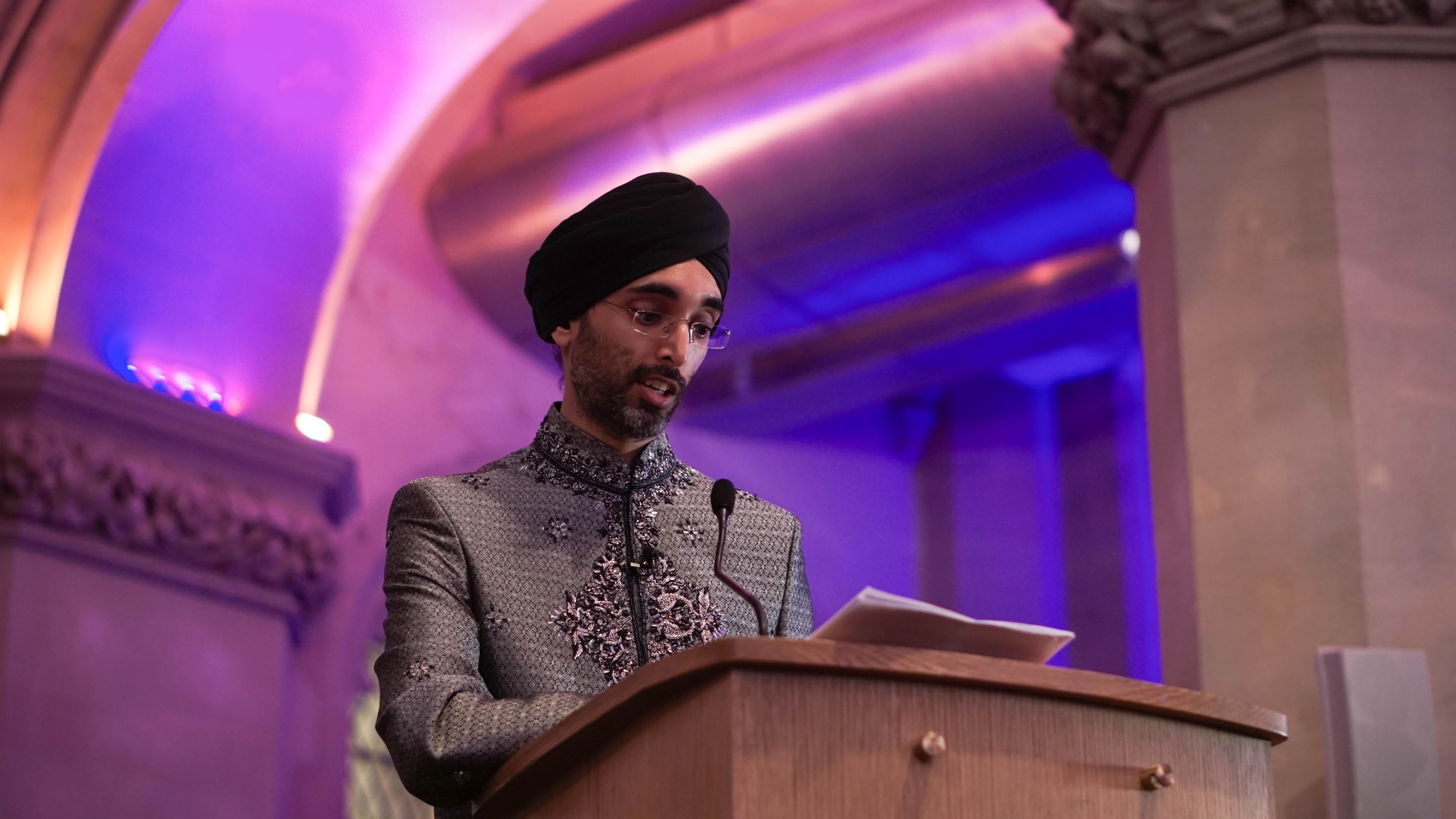
- Singh in 2017
- Born: 1980 (age 45–46); London, England
- Education: Drayton Manor High School
- Alma mater: King's College London; University of Law; BPP Law School
- Occupations: Barrister, Media commentator, Interfaith
- Years active: 2006–present
- Known for: Member of several organisations
- Political party: Labour Party
- Board member of: City Sikhs, British Sikh Report, South Asian Heritage Month, St Pauls Institute, Edward Cadbury Centre, Moral and Ethical Advisory Board
- Awards: CBE (2023), Edward Cadbury Centre Honorary Fellow (2018), OBE (2017)

Jasvir Singh CBE (born 1980) is a British family law barrister, media commentator and social activist. He is a co-founder of South Asian Heritage Month. Singh regularly appears in the British media to speak about the British Sikh experience and also interfaith related matters.

He has been described as being "one of the most prominent Sikh voices in British public life", as well as "one of the UK’s most influential community leaders, with a body of work that has consistently shaped national conversations around faith, equality and social cohesion."

== Career ==
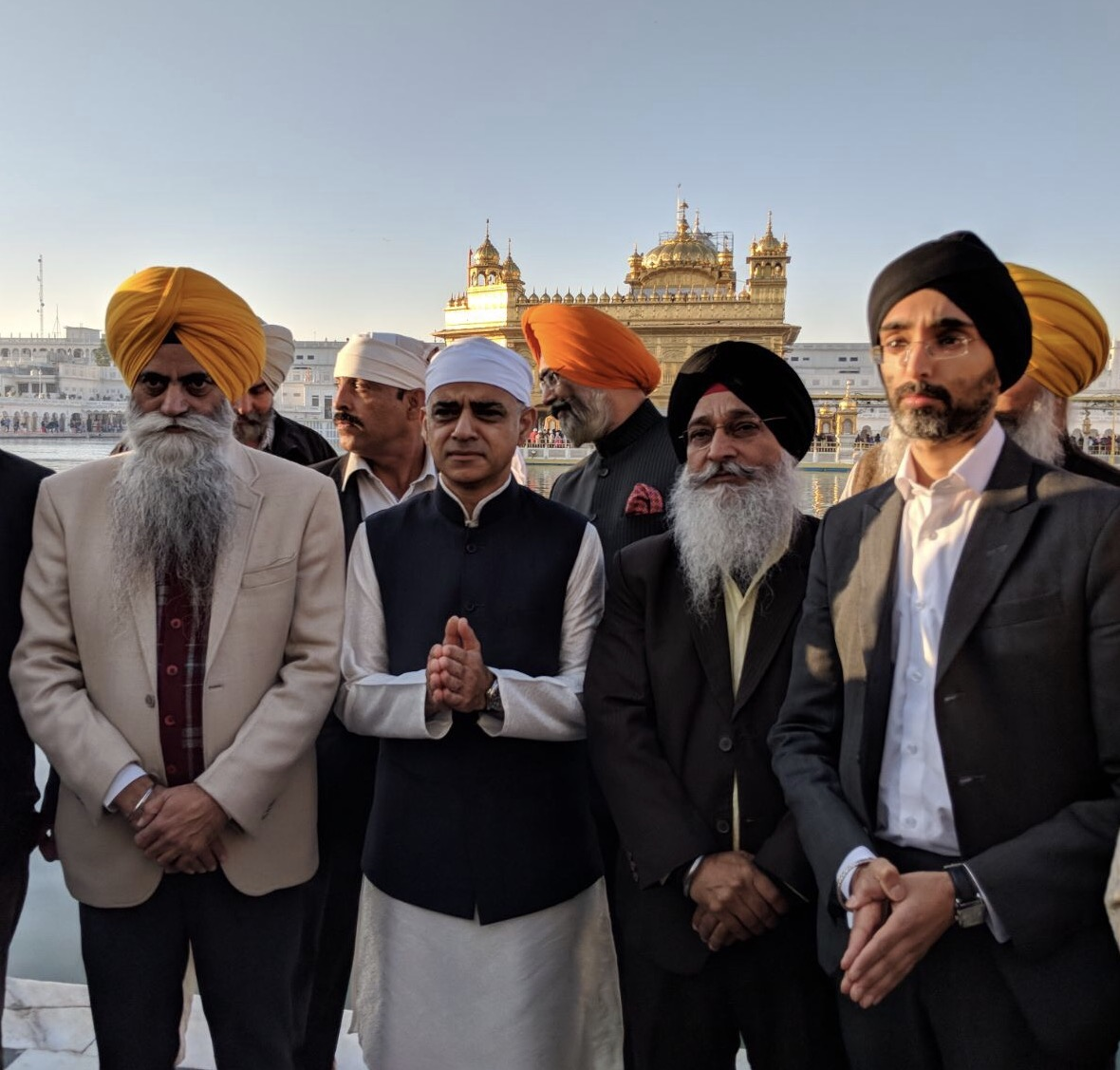
Jasvir Singh CBE accompanying the Mayor of London Sadiq Khan to the Golden Temple in Amritsar, India.

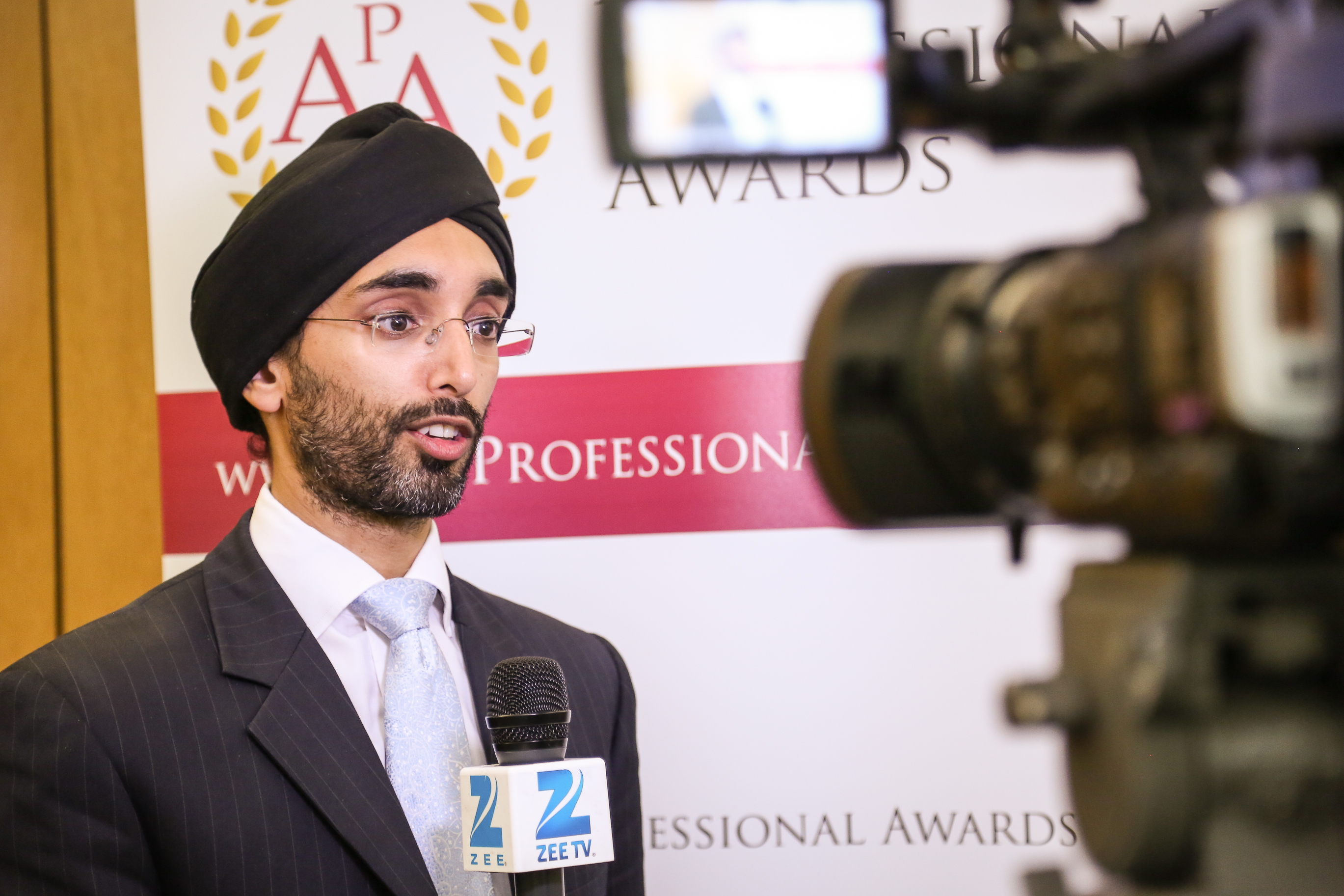
Jasvir Singh CBE presenting at the Parliamentary Launch of the Asian Professional Awards

Born in London in 1980, Singh has worked as a family law barrister since 2006. He made the decision to join the legal profession after he saw an aunt to whom he was close go through a traumatic divorce when he was eight.

He is the former chair for the Faiths Forum for London, an interfaith organisation based in London representing the interests of the nine major faith traditions. He co-founded and is chairperson for City Sikhs, a charity which represents the interests of progressive Sikhs. In 2016 he also became an associate of St Paul's Institute.

He is the main Sikh contributor to the Thought for the Day segment on BBC Radio 4's Today programme.

Singh is a Labour Party activist and following the successful election of Sadiq Khan to the position of Mayor of London in May 2016, he was selected to join the shortlist of Labour candidates for the Tooting by-election.

In 2017, Singh was instrumental in launching the Grand Trunk Project in partnership with DCLG to mark the 70-year anniversary of the independence of India, creation of Pakistan, and the partition of Punjab and Bengal with the aim of bringing the diverse communities of South Asia together. The project was named after the Grand Trunk Road which has connected Bangladesh, India and Pakistan for over 2,000 years.

Singh is the founder of South Asian Heritage Month in the UK, a national awareness month which aims to celebrate British South Asian culture and identity.

He was co-chair of the Moral and Ethical Advisory Group, which provided independent advice to the UK government on moral, ethical and faith considerations on health and social care related issues from 2019 to 2022 and was active throughout the Covid-19 pandemic.

In February 2021, he was appointed to the Mayor of London's Commission for Diversity in the Public Realm.

Singh is also a trustee of the Kaleidoscope Trust, a nonprofit organisation that campaigns for the human rights of LGBT+ people around the world. Its mission is to help create a world where LGBT+ people are free, safe and equal everywhere.

== Honours, awards and recognition ==
Singh was appointed Officer of the Order of the British Empire (OBE) in the 2017 New Year Honours for services to promoting community cohesion and Commander of the Order of the British Empire (CBE) in the 2023 New Year Honours for services to charity, faith communities and social cohesion. His CBE was awarded in recognition of his work bringing together faith communities and advocating for groups that are vulnerable.

In 2018, he was made an honorary fellow of the Edward Cadbury Centre for the Public Understanding of Religion based at the University of Birmingham in recognition of his Interfaith work.

In 2023, he was named Alumnus of the Year by King's College London, and in 2026 he was made a Fellow of King's College London.

== Personal life ==
Singh is a Sikh and is openly gay. He married his husband in summer 2022.

== See also ==
- List of British Sikhs
- British Asians
- South Asian Heritage Month
- British Sikh Report
- City Sikhs
