= Faith and Belief Forum =

Interfaith organisation in the UK

The Faith and Belief Forum, formerly known as the Three Faiths Forum (3FF), is an interfaith organisation in the United Kingdom.

The organisation creates safe spaces in schools, universities, workplaces and the wider community where people can engage with questions of belief and identity and meet people different from themselves. Its programmes are intended to help change perceptions, behaviours and attitudes in a more positive direction. The charity is working towards creating a connected and supportive society where people of different faiths, beliefs and cultures have strong, productive and lasting relations.

== History ==
The organisation was founded as the Three Faiths Forum in London in 1997 by Sir Sigmund Sternberg, the Revd Dr Marcus Braybrooke and Sheikh Zaki Badawi with Sidney Shipton as coordinator.

Initially the organisation focused on engaging religious, communal and civic leaders through seminars and events.

Initially an organisation focused on relations between Muslims, Christians and Jews, the charity has since evolved to work with people of all faiths and beliefs, including the non-religious.

In 2018, the organisation changed its name to the Faith & Belief Forum to communicate that it is inclusive to people of all beliefs, whether religious or not.

Michael Sternberg QC KCFO is chair of the trustees of the Faith and Belief Forum. He was chair of the trustees of the Three Faith Forum from 2009.

Phil Champain has been the director since 2015.

Programmes for young people are a key focus of the organisation. In 2004, under the leadership of former director, Stephen Shashoua, it launched its schools programmes and, in 2007, it launched the ParliaMentors leadership programme for university students. In 2008, it launched a branch in the Middle East. In 2009 and 2010, the arts and culture work was launched to create programmes which build bridges between communities through the arts.

From 2004-2015 the total gross income of the charity increased from £60k to £743k. Since then it has increased to £1.3 million

== Programmes ==
=== Schools ===
The organisation is a provider of school programmes which explore faith and belief as they are lived by people today, through its interfaith workshops, school linking and Amplify programmes. The organisation's educational programmes have been commended globally and received many awards, including the UN Awards for Intercultural Innovation and the Shap Award.

=== ParliaMentors ===
The ParliaMentors leadership programme, launched in 2007, equips the next generation of leaders with the skills, experiences and networks they need to advance their careers. In a yearlong programme, university students of different faiths and non-religious beliefs are mentored by parliamentarians, who assist them in developing social action projects with support from leading NGOs.

=== LGBT+Faith ===
The Faith & Belief forum offers tailored training and support for LGBT+ organisations and groups to ensure their spaces, programmes and events are inclusive of the needs of people from different faith and belief backgrounds.

=== Arts and culture ===
The arts and culture events create opportunities for people to connect with others through music, performances and the visual arts. The Urban Dialogues exhibitions ran between 2011 and 2014 and drew in diverse audiences who may not otherwise meet. Artists from a broad range of disciplines were involved to create work and events that explore concepts of belief, faith and cultural identity in contemporary society. The Mixed-Up Chorus intercultural choir unites people through their love of music.

The King’s Artist Salons brings together artists, academics and campaigners to create new collaborative artistic work around the theme of conflict and belief in the UK, in collaboration with King’s Cultural Institute.

== International ==
=== The Faith & Belief Forum Middle East ===
The Israel branch of The Faith & Belief Forum works in the humanities and healthcare to improve intercultural relations between people of different faiths and beliefs.

== Awards and recognitions ==
- 2014 Camden’s Mayor Charity of the year
- 2014 Doha International Interfaith Award
- 2014 The Shap Award for schools
- 2010 UN Award for Intercultural Innovation: ParliaMentors
- 2009 UN Award for Intercultural Innovation: Tools 4 Trialogue (Schools)
- 2009 Institute for Community Cohesion Official Commendation: Tools 4 Trialogue (Schools)
