= Wake Up Sid (soundtrack) =

Wake Up Sid (Original Motion Picture Soundtrack)

Soundtrack album by Shankar–Ehsaan–Loy and Amit Trivedi
- Released: 21 August 2009
- Genre: Feature film soundtrack
- Length: 27:53
- Language: Hindi
- Label: Sony Music Entertainment
- Producer: Karan Johar

Shankar–Ehsaan–Loy chronology
| London Dreams (2009) | Wake Up Sid (Original Motion Picture Soundtrack) (2009) | My Name Is Khan (2010) |

Amit Trivedi chronology
| Dev.D (2009) | Wake Up Sid (2009) | Striker (2010) |

Wake Up Sid (Original Motion Picture Soundtrack) is the soundtrack album to the 2009 film of the same name directed by Ayan Mukerji and produced by Dharma Productions, starring Ranbir Kapoor and Konkona Sen Sharma. The soundtrack consisted of seven songs composed by Shankar–Ehsaan–Loy and Amit Trivedi, as the guest composer, with lyrics written by Javed Akhtar. It was released under the Sony Music India label on 21 August 2009. It was nominated for three Filmfare Awards, winning Best Female Playback Singer for Kavita Seth. The album further won an IIFA Award and Mirchi Music Award.

== Background ==
The soundtrack to Wake Up Sid consisted of five original songs composed by Shankar–Ehsaan–Loy, known for his previous collaborations with Karan Johar and Javed Akhtar being the norm associator for writing the lyrics. Since the film being in production for three years, with the trio's commitments on multiple projects, meant that they could not compose the background score. Amit Trivedi, who had until then not yet found fame until he achieved a breakthrough with the soundtrack of Dev.D (2009), was tasked on completing the film score.

Trivedi also composed the song "Iktara" which had vocals by Kavita Seth and his frequent collaborator Amitabh Bhattacharya. Seth was chosen to sing the track, after Trivedi called her to record a demo version of the song, and liked the texture of her voice which found it apt for the film. Though the film was supposed to have a female version of the song, Trivedi composed a male version that was sung by Tochi Raina and Raman Mahadevan. This version was not publicly released as it was recorded at the last minute since the CD production was already over. Trivedi assured that the male version would be released digitally. An extended version of the song "Boondon Ke Moti" sung by Salim Merchant remains unreleased till date.

== Reception ==
Chandrima Pal of Rediff.com gave the album 3.5 stars, and wrote, "the music sticks to the brief. It is hip, urban and bubbly, and unhurried. And thanks to Shankar Ehsaan Loy's musicianship, it is a slick, well-balanced production". Joginder Tuteja, in his review for Bollywood Hungama, also rated 3.5 stars out of 5, and reviewed, "this may not really turn out to be the bestseller of the year but should certainly be a perfect fit for the narrative." Vipin Nair of Music Aloud wrote "Its refreshing to see SEL take a diversion from their usual route when it comes to movies from the Karan Johar household."

Ruchika Kher, writing for Indo-Asian News Service, gave 3 out of 5 to the album, stating "the composers have stuck to their signature style and have given music that will be liked by many." Anand Vaishnav, in his review for News18, gave 2.5 out of 5 and wrote "Despite the smooth feel of the album, S-E-L surprisingly avoid any experimentation in the score. It's their template sound that one has been hearing since Dil Chahta Hai." Karthik Srinivasan of Milliblog wrote "Shankar Ehsaan Loy now have 2 distinct styles of music – one, the very-Indian, very-SEL sound they pioneered that occasionally, unfortunately sounds jaded (Luck By Chance!). The second is what they pioneered with Rock On – a more accessible pop-rock genre that embodies Bollywood idioms rather well for better reach. Wake Up Sid, thankfully, is soaked in the latter."

== Track listing ==
All lyrics are written by Javed Akhtar.

Wake Up Sid (Original Motion Picture Soundtrack) track listing
| No. | Title | Music | Artist(s) | Length |
|---|---|---|---|---|
| 1. | "Wake Up Sid!" | Shankar–Ehsaan–Loy | Shankar Mahadevan | 3:51 |
| 2. | "Kya Karoon?" | Shankar–Ehsaan–Loy | Clinton Cerejo | 3:56 |
| 3. | "Aaj Kal Zindagi" | Shankar–Ehsaan–Loy | Shankar Mahadevan | 4:14 |
| 4. | "Iktara" (Female) | Amit Trivedi | Kavita Seth | 4:13 |
| 5. | "Life Is Crazy" | Shankar–Ehsaan–Loy | Uday Benegal | 3:41 |
| 6. | "Iktara" (Male) | Amit Trivedi | Tochi Raina, Raman Mahadevan | 4:12 |
| 7. | "Wake Up Sid!" (Club Mix) | Shankar–Ehsaan–Loy | Shankar Mahadevan | 3:43 |
| Total length: | | | | 27:53 |

== Accolades ==
Accolades for Wake Up Sid (Original Motion Picture Soundtrack)
| Award | Category | Recipients | Result | Ref. |
|---|---|---|---|---|
| Filmfare Awards | Best Music Director | Shankar–Ehsaan–Loy | Nominated | |
| Filmfare Awards | Best Lyricist | Javed Akhtar for "Iktara" | Nominated | |
| Filmfare Awards | Best Female Playback Singer | Kavita Seth for "Iktara" | Won | |
| Screen Awards | Best Female Playback Singer | Kavita Seth for "Iktara" | Won | |
| Stardust Awards | New Musical Sensation – Female | Kavita Seth for "Iktara" | Won | |
| Global Indian Music Academy Awards | Best Film Song | "Iktara" | Won | |
| Global Indian Music Academy Awards | Best Female Playback Singer | Kavita Seth for "Iktara" | Won | |
| Global Indian Music Academy Awards | Singer of the Year (HT Readers Choice) | Kavita Seth for "Iktara" | Won | |
| International Indian Film Academy Awards | Best Female Playback Singer | Kavita Seth for "Iktara" | Won | |
| Mirchi Music Awards | Listeners' Choice Song of the Year | "Iktara" | Won | |
