= Lootera (soundtrack) =

Soundtrack album by Amit Trivedi
- Released: 29 May 2013
- Recorded: 2012–2013
- Studios: AT Studios, Mumbai; YRF Studios, Mumbai; AM Studios, Chennai
- Genre: Feature film soundtrack
- Length: 25:32
- Language: Hindi
- Label: T-Series
- Producer: Amit Trivedi

Amit Trivedi chronology
| Bombay Talkies (2013) | Lootera (2013) | Ghanchakkar (2013) |

Lootera is the soundtrack album to the 2013 film of the same name directed by Vikramaditya Motwane, starring Ranveer Singh and Sonakshi Sinha. The film's musical score and songs is composed by Amit Trivedi which featured six songs written by Amitabh Bhattacharya. Trivedi composed the songs that resembled the 1950s style of Hindi film music and utilized a live orchestra for the score. The musical album was released on 7 June 2013 via T-Series and received positive reviews from critics. Monali Thakur won the Filmfare Award for Best Female Playback Singer for the song "Sawaar Loon" amongst other accolades.

== Development ==
Amit Trivedi composed the film's soundtrack and background score in his second collaboration with Motwane after Udaan (2010). The music sets the tone for the film and has to be set in the style of old Hindi film music which had to be melodious and lyrical. As a result, Trivedi opted to keep two antaras followed by a mukhra in the songs, to match the musical style of the 1950s. He further collaborated with the Chennai String Orchestra to record the orchestral portions for the score.

While discussing the film's music, Motwane cited the song "Piya Tose Naina Laage Re" from Guide (1965) as a reference. This influenced him to compose the track "Sawaar Loon" which gave him "an idea about the kind of vision he had and I just followed that". Monali Thakur performed the vocals for the song, after Trivedi recommended her as she previously sung for his composition "Aga Bai" for the film Aiyyaa (2012). Bhattacharya had written a phrase in Bengali for the song, but the crew liked "Sawaar Loon" which had him to connect the lyrics to the mukhra of the song that worked out very well.

The song "Zinda" was not supposed to be in the album. He composed the song when he was going through a tough time personally, where he used a harmonium and came up with tune and lyrics of the mukhra that became the climax of the film. Bhattacharya felt that rewriting the mukhra was not possible and had to be responsible while writing the impactful antaras. The song "Shikayatein" was composed and written in Goa, where Trivedi and Bhattacharya were holidaying. "Monta Re" has its musical influence from the Baul musical tradition of Bengal.

All the songs were composed and recorded in a single session, without retakes. Trivedi described the film's music as a tribute to R. D. Burman in terms of melody and orchestration.

== Marketing and release ==
On 17 May 2013, the makers unveiled the video of the song "Sawaar Loon" through social networking pages, and ten days later, they released another video for the song "Ankahee". The six-track album was exclusively made available on iTunes on 29 May 2013. The album was released on 7 June 2013 at PVR Cinemas, Juhu in Mumbai with the cast and crew, along with a musical performance by Trivedi, Bhattacharya, Shilpa Rao and Swanand Kirkire.

== Reception ==
=== Critical reception ===
Lootera's soundtrack received positive reviews from critics. Sankhayan Ghosh of The Indian Express assigned three-and-a-half out of five and stated, "Lootera has the kind of sublimity that will grow with time, and work even better with the film." Yashika Mathur of Daily News and Analysis also rated the same and described that the album has "fine compositions" and a "relaxed compilation of songs". Devesh Sharma of Filmfare wrote "with the zany, experimental Ghanchakkar and the period feel of the present album, he seems to be going great guns" calling it as "another winner from Amit Trivedi". Suparna Thombare of Bollywood Life called the album as "entirely sombre, with melancholic undertones, making you yearn for some variety in mood and change in energy". Karthik Srinivasan of Milliblog stated, "Trust Amit to spring back with a vengeance from his recent middling state"

However, a reviewer from Firstpost wrote "Lootera disappoints because only Sawaar Loon and Monta Re match up to our expectations of the magic we expect in an Amit Trivedi soundtrack." Writing for the same website, in their best Hindi film albums of the past decade, listed Lootera and called it as "exquisitely chiseled" and "delicate", calling it as "possibly the most underrated soundtrack of the last 10 years".

=== Accolades ===
Accolades for Lootera
| Award | Category | Recipient(s) and nominee(s) | Result | Ref(s) |
|---|---|---|---|---|
| BIG Star Entertainment Awards | Most Entertaining Singer – Female | Monali Thakur for "Sawaar Loon" | Nominated | |
| Filmfare Awards | Best Music Director | Amit Trivedi | Nominated | |
| Filmfare Awards | Best Lyricist | Amitabh Bhattacharya for "Shikayatein" | Nominated | |
| Filmfare Awards | Best Female Playback Singer | Monali Thakur for "Sawaar Loon" | Won | |
| Global Indian Music Academy Awards | Best Female Playback Singer | Monali Thakur for "Sawaar Loon" | Nominated | |
| International Indian Film Academy Awards | Best Female Playback Singer | Monali Thakur for "Sawaar Loon" | Nominated | |
| Mirchi Music Awards | Female Vocalist of the Year | Monali Thakur for "Sawaar Loon" | Nominated | |
| Producers Guild Film Awards | Best Lyricist | Amitabh Bhattacharya for "Sawar Loon" and "Ankahee" | Nominated | |
| Producers Guild Film Awards | Best Female Playback Singer | Monali Thakur for "Sawaar Loon" | Nominated | |
| Screen Awards | Best Female Playback Singer | Monali Thakur for "Sawaar Loon" | Nominated | |
| Zee Cine Awards | Best Music Director | Amit Trivedi | Nominated | |
| Zee Cine Awards | Best Background Score | Amit Trivedi | Nominated | |
| Zee Cine Awards | Best Lyricist | Amitabh Bhattacharya for "Shikayatein" | Nominated | |
| Zee Cine Awards | Best Playback Singer – Female | Monali Thakur for "Sawaar Loon" | Nominated | |

== Plagiarism allegations ==
The notes from the song "Shikayatein" were used in the background score for the first promotional trailer. Following its release, speculations arose that the theme was similar to Rachel Portman's score suite composed for One Day (2011). However, Motwane clarified that it was derived from a small sourced bit (from the song "Shikayatein") was developed as a theme for the trailer, but also sounded similar to the theme which was coincidental. Trivedi further got in touch with Portman to explain the similarities between those two themes which was amicably solved later.

== Track listing ==
The track listing was revealed on 29 May 2013 on the official social network page of the film.

All lyrics are written by Amitabh Bhattacharya.

Lootera (Original Motion Picture Soundtrack) track listing
| No. | Title | Singer(s) | Length |
|---|---|---|---|
| 1. | "Sawaar Loon" | Monali Thakur | 4:15 |
| 2. | "Ankahee" | Amitabh Bhattacharya | 4:35 |
| 3. | "Shikayatein" | Mohan Kanan | 4:30 |
| 4. | "Monta Re" | Swanand Kirkire | 3:58 |
| 5. | "Zinda" | Amit Trivedi | 4:01 |
| 6. | "Manmarziyan" | Shilpa Rao, Amitabh Bhattacharya, Amit Trivedi | 4:15 |
| Total length: | | | 25:32 |
