= Aiyyaa (soundtrack) =

Soundtrack album by Amit Trivedi
- Released: 21 September 2012
- Recorded: 2011–2012
- Studio: A T Studios, Mumbai
- Genre: Feature film soundtrack
- Length: 27:36
- Language: Hindi
- Label: T-Series
- Producer: Amit Trivedi

Amit Trivedi chronology
English Vinglish (2012)	Aiyyaa (2012)	Luv Shuv Tey Chicken Khurana (2012)
External audio
- Audio Jukebox on YouTube

Aiyyaa is the soundtrack album to the 2012 film of the same name directed by Sachin Kundalkar starring Prithviraj Sukumaran and Rani Mukerji. The film's musical score and soundtrack was composed by Amit Trivedi with lyrics written by Amitabh Bhattacharya. The album was released under the T-Series label on 21 September 2012 to positive reviews from critics, with "Dreamum Wakeupum" being one of the popular songs from the album.

== Development ==
Amit Trivedi composed the film's soundtrack and musical score. The film's music emphasized on Marathi music and flavour, as the story is set in Maharashtra. The song "Aga Bai" and "Sava Dollar", respectively sung by Sunidhi Chauhan and Monali Thakur, had strong influences on lavani. Trivedi associated with an elderly woman, who was a sarod player, to record that instrument, but found it difficult to play the song as the lyrics were filled with innuendos. He would only complete the sarod recital after recording the vocals for the song.

"What To Do Auwai?" is a song which he described it as "eccentric as Emosonal Atyachaar" and had vocals by Sneha Khanwalkar and Amitabh Bhattacharya; the song emphasizes various styles ranging from fusion to classical, and had barks of dog mouthed by a human, as backing vocals. "Dreamum Wakeupum" was considered an unusual song for Trivedi, as he wanted a South Indian flavor to the song. Trivedi further insisted the singer Sowmya Raoh to be more subtle and have fun while singing.

Initially, it received criticism from a section of audience, as it believed to being mocked South Indians, and added "I haven't come across anyone who didn't find the song humorous. It wasn't meant to offend anyone. Besides, adding 'mum' to words is basically a Malayalam trait, not necessarily Tamil. The underlying idea was to Sanskritise the lyrics." Rani Mukerji also defended the song, calling it as a tribute to South films of the 1980s.

== Release ==
The film's music was launched on 21 September 2012 at the Inorbit Mall in Malad, Mumbai, with the lead actors and the crew in attendance.

== Track listing ==
No.	Title	Singer(s)	Length
1.	"Dreamum Wakeupum"	Sowmya Raoh	3:30
2.	"Sava Dollar"	Sunidhi Chauhan	4:47
3.	"Aga Bai"	Shalmali Kholgade, Monali Thakur, Yo Yo Honey Singh, Indeep Bakshi	4:24
4.	"Mahek Bhi"	Shreya Ghoshal	5:17
5.	"What To Do"	Sneha Khanwalkar, Amitabh Bhattacharya	5:25
6.	"Wakda"	Amit Trivedi	4:10
Total length:			27:36

== Reception ==
A reviewer from Indo-Asian News Service wrote: "the album is hilarious to the core and has wonderful tracks that can be cherished for a long time." Devesh Sharma of Filmfare called it as "one of the most offbeat and hilarious albums". Joginder Tuteja of Bollywood Hungama wrote: "as stated earlier, expectations had soared after 'Dreamum Wakeupum' was heard first. However rest of the album turns out to be average to good but not quite an overall package that could make one vouch for this one as a musical entertainer in the offering." Karthik Srinivasan of Milliblog stated "After successfully scaling most other genres, Amit Trivedi leaves his stamp convincingly by delivering one of the most hip parody soundtracks in recent times."

Reviewing the song "Aga Bai", critic based at Hindustan Times stated, "A folksy tune set to a house track, ‘Aga bai’ stands apart for its edgy vocals and catchy chorus. The song represents Trivedi's trademark style, previously seen in Dev.D (2009)." Nandini Ramnath of Scroll.in called "Dreamum Wakeupum" as an "imaginative ode to ’80s songs that featured actors furiously gyrating against outsized props." Sankhayan Ghosh of Film Companion, ranked Aiyyaa as the seventh-best album of Trivedi, calling it as "a mad soundtrack for a surreal movie". He also ranked it as one of the best Hindi film soundtracks of the decade (2010–2019).

== Awards and nominations ==
Ceremony	Category	Recipient	Result	Ref.
Mirchi Music Awards	Upcoming Female Vocalist of the Year	Shalmali Kholgade – ("Aga Bai")	Nominated	

== Legacy ==
The song "Dreamum Wakeupum" achieved instant popularity owing to Instagram Reels with short videos that covered the song, resurfaced during the late-2020s.
