= Striker (soundtrack) =

2010 film soundtrack album

Soundtrack album by Vishal Bhardwaj, Amit Trivedi, Yuvan Shankar Raja, Blaaze, Swanand Kirkire and Shailendra Barve
- Released: 12 January 2010
- Recorded: 2009
- Genre: Feature film soundtrack
- Length: 39:35
- Language: Hindi
- Label: T-Series
- Producer: Siddharth; Chandan Arora

Vishal Bhardwaj chronology
Ishqiya (2010)	Striker (2010)	7 Khoon Maaf (2011)

Amit Trivedi chronology
Wake Up Sid (2010)	Striker (2010)	Admissions Open (2010)

Yuvan Shankar Raja chronology
Goa (2010)	Striker (2010)	Theeradha Vilaiyattu Pillai (2010)

Blaaze chronology
Saas Bahu Aur Sensex (2008)	Striker (2010)	Time For Gandhi (2011)

Swanand Kirkire chronology
Striker (2010)	Bandwaale (2026)

Shailendra Barve chronology
Nero's Guests (2009)	Striker (2010)	Gajaar: Journey of the Soul (2011)

Striker is the soundtrack album to the 2010 film of the same name directed by Chandan Arora starring Siddharth, Usha Jadhav, and Padmapriya. The soundtrack accompanied eight songs composed by an assortment of musicians, which included Vishal Bhardwaj, Amit Trivedi, Yuvan Shankar Raja (in his Hindi film debut), Blaaze, Swanand Kirkire and Shailendra Barve with lyrics contributed by Gulzar, Nitin Raikwar, Prashant Ingole, Jeetendra Joshi, Kirkire and Blaaze themselves. The album was released on 12 January 2010 under the T-Series label.

== Background and development ==
Chandan Arora stated that he and Siddharth wanted to create music which was quite different from the conventional mainstream cinema by curating an ensemble soundtrack, and were clear on the kind of music they envisioned. Considering it an intense film, the team decided to refrain lip-syncing songs to make it realistic. Hence most of the songs appear as montages throughout the film. The team had recorded two of the songs with composer Shailendra Barve, even before filming began. However, they decided to work on the rest of the songs during the post-production phase.

Arora assembled a wishlist of multiple composers whom they wanted to come onboard. He considered it to be "lucky" as most of the noted names in film music scene—lyricist Gulzar and Swanand Kirkire, musicians Vishal Bhardwaj, Amit Trivedi, Yuvan Shankar Raja and Blaaze—had agreed to be onboard after watching the film, and planned to compose one track each for the film, which they really enjoyed. Though two songs did not feature in the film, the rest of the songs appear in crucial points of the narrative. Shri Shriam (credited as Shri) composed the original score.

Siddharth who produced the album had also sung two songs "Bombay Bombay" and "Haq Se". Siddharth stated that Arora had convinced him to sing those two songs, as he had also sung for Telugu and Hindi films as well. However, unlike his previous films, he considered his vocals in those songs "more raw and edgy" as he had embodied the character. Arora considered the song "Bombay Bombay" as perfect tribute to Mumbai where the film is based.

== Track listing ==
Tracklist
No.	Title	Lyrics	Music	Singer(s)	Length
1.	"Aim Lagaa"	Nitin Raikwar, Blaaze	Blaaze	Blaaze	3:07
2.	"Aim Lagaa - Ricksha Mix"	Nitin Raikwar, Blaaze	Blaaze	Blaaze	3:19
3.	"Bombay Bombay"	Prashant Ingole	Amit Trivedi	Siddharth	5:07
4.	"Cham Cham"	Jeetendra Joshi	Shailendra Barve	Sonu Nigam	7:12
5.	"Haq Se"	Nitin Raikwar	Yuvan Shankar Raja	Siddharth, Yuvan Shankar Raja	5:43
6.	"Maula"	Swanand Kirkire	Swanand Kirkire	Swanand Kirkire	4:52
7.	"Pia Saanvara"	Jeetendra Joshi	Shailendra Barve	Sunidhi Chauhan	5:05
8.	"Yun Hua"	Gulzar	Vishal Bhardwaj	Vishal Bhardwaj	5:10
Total length:					39:35

== Reception ==
According to music critic Karthik Srinivasan, in his column for Bangalore Mirror, he stated "Six composers in a soundtrack is a sure-shot recipe for disaster, but in Striker, Chandan Arora gets them to produce a heady mélange". Joginder Tuteja of Bollywood Hungama stated "Nothing wrong with being unconventional but then if an album has to make an impression commercially, it requires an adequate backing as well; something which is completely missing in case of Striker."

Vipin Nair of Music Aloud called it "a very interesting album, coming from a good mix of musicians, all of whom, we can look forward to in the future." Sukanya Verma of Rediff.com called it an "eclectic soundtrack". Sanjukta Sharma of Mint stated that "Arora uses music effectively, lending the film a mood that matches the precariously balanced lives at stake here" and called "Yun Hua" as her favorite from the album. Shubhra Gupta of The Indian Express and Mayank Shekhar of Hindustan Times called the music "soothing" and "evocative".
