= Udta Punjab (soundtrack) =

Soundtrack album by Amit Trivedi
- Released: 18 May 2016
- Recorded: 2015–2016
- Studios: A T Studios, Mumbai; The Click Studio, Mumbai
- Genre: Feature film soundtrack
- Length: 38:53
- Label: Zee Music Company
- Producer: Amit Trivedi

Amit Trivedi chronology
Fitoor (2016)	Udta Punjab (2016)	Dear Zindagi (2016)

Udta Punjab is the soundtrack album to the 2016 film of the same name directed by Abhishek Chaubey and produced by Balaji Motion Pictures and Phantom Films starring Shahid Kapoor, Kareena Kapoor Khan, Alia Bhatt and Diljit Dosanjh. The film soundtrack is composed by Amit Trivedi and lyrics written by the late Shiv Kumar Batalvi, Shellee and Varun Grover. The film score was composed by Benedict Taylor and Naren Chandavarkar. The soundtrack was released under the Zee Music Company on 18 May 2016.

== Production ==
Amit Trivedi composed the film's soundtrack in his maiden collaboration with Chaubey; Anurag Kashyap, one of the film's producers, recommended Trivedi to compose the film, replacing Vishal Bhardwaj, who previously worked with Chaubey on Ishqiya (2010) and Dedh Ishqiya (2014). The brief given to Trivedi was to curate a new soundscape for the character Tommy Singh (Kapoor) so it would depict the story through its music. He further opined that "the whole album is Tommy Singh's expression [...] He is a drug addict. He is high on cocaine everytime. He is loud, edgy and trippy guy. The entire characterisation of Tommy Singh had to be done through music. That's why the music is trippy, edgy, dark, young and cool."

Trivedi integrated psychedelic trance and hip hop music on curating the film's soundtrack, while also being influenced by Punjabi folk music through its songs. Since Kapoor was not ready for singing, Trivedi and Chaubey tried to sort out several singers who could sing and rap but could not find anyone. This resulted in Shahid Mallya and Banu Pratap Singh to provide the singing vocals for Tommy Singh and Babu Haabi as the rap vocals. Other singers included Diljit Dosanjh, Kanika Kapoor, Vishal Dadlani and Trivedi himself. According to Trivedi, he found composing music as a challenge, as it had to be commercially viable adding "We had to keep everything in mind before recording a song. It was quite difficult for me."

Trivedi stated that most of his films were "in his druggie headspace" until when Tommy Singh is reformed, the music then shifted to two simplistic and folksy songs, which was like both rehab and gurudwara, being "the two extremes of the album. The final product is a result of a lot of filtering down." Trivedi further added that he had to rewrite the lyrics for the title track, as if those lyrics were retained, would face censorship issues.

The music rights for the film were acquired by Zee Music Company for ₹18 crore (US$1.9 million), making it the then-biggest such deal in Hindi film music scene. Initially, T-Series was reported to acquire the film's music rights, but the label's vice president Priya Gupta denied such claims.

== Marketing and release ==
The soundtrack was preceded by the first song "Chitta Ve" which released on 4 May 2016, and the second song "Ikk Kudi", then followed on 11 May. The soundtrack was released digitally on 16 May.

== Critical reception ==
Aelina Kapoor of Rediff.com wrote "It is a tough task to put together a theme-based soundtrack for a film and make it interesting and entertaining enough to find an audience. Amit Trivedi and Shellee make it happen with Udta Punjab." Devesh Sharma of Filmfare described it as "a hugely entertaining and original album that pulls all the right strings" making it Trivedi's "best offering in recent times". Sankhayan Ghosh of The Hindu wrote "It's unfair to form a judgement about an album after a few listens but at the moment Udta Punjab is a good album that has moments of brilliance."

Manish Gaekwad of Scroll.in wrote that "the film's music coaxes listeners to get hooked to its trippy sounds instead." Suanshu Khurana of The Indian Express wrote "The end of the album got me thinking what its makers were on — they've got the drug-soaked sound and the intoxication to a tee. Buy it to enter one of the more versatile worlds Trivedi has created in a while." Swetha Ramakrishnan of Firstpost wrote "Udta Punjab feels like a 30 minute long high, it makes you deliriously happy in parts, really sucks you into its rhythms and then leaves you with a lingering sense of drowning into something." Karthik Srinivasan of Milliblog wrote "Amit offers a welcome diversion from the Honey Singh brand of Punjabi music."

Rohit Mehrotra of The Quint wrote "we expected much more because it is after all the 'am' 'it' man at work, but the overall album is a tad underwhelming. Pick this one up for Ikk Kudi, Da Da Dasse and of course Ud-daa Punjab and you won't be disappointed." Joginder Tuteja of Bollywood Hungama wrote "Udta Punjab has a shaky start to it but becomes better as it proceeds. Though one waits to see the kind of acceptance that it manages to find in the commercial zone, one has to admit that this experimental score is different and daring for sure."

== Controversy ==
The Central Board of Film Certification (CBFC) demanded the removal of the song "Chitta Ve" due to its objectionable lyrics, although it was later included in the film with the lyrics being modified. In early June 2016, Sarba Mann from Barnala, Punjab filed a lawsuit against the producers and the music label, accusing them of intellectual property infringement; Mann claimed that he had written lyrics for the song "Chitta" and claimed that the producers had sold the song without his consent.

== Track listing ==
No.	Title	Lyrics	Singer(s)	Length
1.	"Chitta Ve"	Shellee	Babu Haabi, Shahid Mallya, Bhanu Pratap Singh	4:48
2.	"Da Da Dasse"	Shellee	Kanika Kapoor, Babu Haabi	4:01
3.	"Ikk Kudi"	Shiv Kumar Batalvi	Shahid Mallya	4:02
4.	"Ud-Daa Punjab"	Varun Grover	Amit Trivedi, Vishal Dadlani	4:35
5.	"Hass Nache Le"	Shellee	Shahid Mallya	4:30
6.	"Vadiya"	Shellee	Amit Trivedi	4:29
7.	"Ikk Kudi" (Reprised Version)	Shiv Kumar Batalvi	Diljit Dosanjh	4:07
8.	"Ikk Kudi" (Club Mix)	Shiv Kumar Batalvi	Alia Bhatt, Diljit Dosanjh	4:14
9.	"Ikk Kudi" (Asees Kaur Version)	Shiv Kumar Batalvi	Asees Kaur	4:07
Total length:				38:53

== Accolades ==
Award	Date of ceremony (Note: Date is linked to the article about the awards held that year, wherever possible.)	Category	Recipient(s) and nominee(s)	Result	Ref.
Stardust Awards	19 December 2016	Best Music Director	Amit Trivedi	Nominated	
Stardust Awards	19 December 2016	Best Music Album	Zee Music Company	Nominated	
Filmfare Awards	14 January 2017	Best Music Director	Amit Trivedi	Nominated	
Filmfare Awards	14 January 2017	Best Lyricist	Late Shiv Kumar Batalvi (for the song "Ikk Kudi")	Nominated	
Filmfare Awards	14 January 2017	Best Female Playback Singer	Kanika Kapoor (for the song "Da Da Dasse")	Nominated	
Mirchi Music Awards	18 February 2017	Album of the Year	Amit Trivedi, Shiv Kumar Batalvi, Shellee, Varun Grover	Nominated	
Mirchi Music Awards	18 February 2017	Music Composer of the Year	Amit Trivedi (for the song "Ikk Kudi")	Nominated	
Mirchi Music Awards	18 February 2017	Raag-Inspired Song of the Year	"Ikk Kudi"	Nominated	
International Indian Film Academy Awards	14–15 July 2017	Best Music Director	Amit Trivedi	Nominated	
International Indian Film Academy Awards	14–15 July 2017	Best Male Playback Singer	Diljit Dosanjh (for the song "Ikk Kudi")	Nominated	
International Indian Film Academy Awards	14–15 July 2017	Best Female Playback Singer	Kanika Kapoor (for the song "Da Da Dasse")	Won	
