= Cute & Dangerous =

- Sevimli Tehlikeli
- Directed by: Özcan Deniz; Reyhan Pekar
- Written by: Özcan Deniz
- Produced by: Şükrü Avşar
- Starring: Şükrü Özyıldız; Ayça Ayşin Turan; Türkan Kılıç; Cem Avnayim; Taner Turan; Burçin Birben; Ahmet Özaslan; Evrim Doğan
- Cinematography: Vedat Özdemir
- Edited by: Elif Durak
- Music by: Yıldıray Gürgen; Guest Composer: Amit Trivedi
- Production companies: Warner Bros. Turkey; Avşar Film; DNZ Film
- Distributed by: Warner Bros Pictures
- Release date: 6 February 2015
- Running time: 113 minutes
- Country: Turkey
- Language: Turkish

Cute & Dangerous, is a 2015 Turkish romantic comedy directed by Özcan Deniz and Reyhan Pekar. Unlike some of Deniz's earlier films, Deniz does not appear on-screen in this film and serves solely behind the camera. The film stars Şükrü Özyıldız, Ayça Ayşin Turan, Türkan Kılıç, Cem Avnayim, Taner Turan, Burçin Birben, Ahmet Özaslan and Evrim Doğan.

== Plot ==
Years ago, a cutpurse named Zarok kidnapped a very young baby girl in Edirne, which resulted in the child being given up for adoption to another family. After many years, Zarok seeks to ease his conscience when he encounters an opportunity. He seizes that opportunity when he later meets Zeliş, whom he had kidnapped years before. This time he plans to kidnap the girl he once took again and bring her to her real family. However, during this process both characters embark on a love-filled adventure.

== Cast ==
- Şükrü Özyıldız (Zarok)
- Ayça Ayşin Turan (Zeliş)
- Türkan Kılıç (Necla)
- Cem Avnayim (Cemal)
- Taner Turan (Hakkı)
- Burçin Birben (Mustafa)
- Ahmet Özaslan (Selim)
- Evrim Doğan (Nurten)
- Ergun Kuyucu (Necmi)
- Efe Deprem (Kenan)
- Zeynep Anıl Tatdıran (Meltem)
- Davut Yezer (Zarok's Friend)

== Production and themes ==
The film was positioned by its press materials and contemporary coverage as a modern love story that blends motifs from fairy tales (reviewers and the press noted references ranging from Robin Hood to Rapunzel and Cinderella).

== Music / Soundtrack ==
The film's soundtrack features the song "Tut Kalbimi", performed by singer Özgür Akkuş. According to contemporary coverage/interviews, the original music for this piece is attributed to Indian composer Amit Trivedi's London Thumakda from the film Queen. The Akkuş recorded version was particularly used in the film.

== Reception ==
Contemporary reviews highlighted that Özcan Deniz has continued to build a directing career around "love films" and that in Sevimli Tehlikeli he chose not to appear as an actor, preferring to direct from behind the camera. Critics described the central relationship as one between a likable petty thief (Zarok) and a young woman suffocated by bourgeois boredom, and they noted that the story reunites youths raised in very different environments and cities after many years apart.

Some reviewers observed that, tonally and in its exuberant musicalized visuals, the film evokes elements of Indian (Bollywood) cinema transposed to a Turkish setting; others compared Zarok's Istanbul locales to Yılmaz Erdoğan's Organize İşler and certain encounter scenes to the mood of Winter's Tale.

The same review praised Deniz's commitment to romantic cinema but also noted a wish for stronger cinematographic achievements in this, his fourth directorial effort; it additionally pointed out that lead actor Şükrü Özyıldız was familiar to Turkish audiences from the TV series Şeref Meselesi.
