= My Name Is Khan (soundtrack) =

My Name Is Khan (Original Motion Picture Soundtrack)

Soundtrack album by Shankar–Ehsaan–Loy
- Released: 6 January 2010
- Recorded: 2009
- Studios: SEL Studio, Mumbai
- Genre: Feature film soundtrack
- Length: 27:51
- Languages: Hindi; Urdu
- Label: Sony Music
- Producer: Shankar–Ehsaan–Loy

Shankar–Ehsaan–Loy chronology
London Dreams (2009)	My Name Is Khan (2010)	Karthik Calling Karthik (2010)

My Name Is Khan (Original Motion Picture Soundtrack) is the soundtrack album to the 2010 film My Name Is Khan. The album featured six original songs composed by Shankar–Ehsaan–Loy with lyrics written by Niranjan Iyengar and Javed Akhtar (uncredited). The vocals for the songs were performed by Rahat Fateh Ali Khan, Shankar Mahadevan, Richa Sharma, Shreya Ghoshal, Adnan Sami, Shafqat Amanat Ali, Rashid Khan and Suraj Jagan. My Name is Khan is directed by Karan Johar, produced by Hiroo Yash Johar and Gauri Khan and stars Shah Rukh Khan and Kajol in the lead roles.

The soundtrack to My Name Is Khan was highly anticipated owing to the trio's successful collaborations with Johar and Shah Rukh. Distributed by Sony Music, the album was released on 6 January 2010 and met with positive reviews from critics with praise directed on its melodic nature and Sufi influences in the compositions and lyrics. It was nominated for various accolades, including the Filmfare, IIFA (winning two) and Mirchi Music Awards (winning two). The trio further won the Screen Award for Best Music Director.

== Development ==
Shankar–Ehsaan–Loy composed the film's music and score to My Name Is Khan; they had previously worked with Johar in Kal Ho Naa Ho (2003), Kabhi Alvida Naa Kehna (2006) and Wake Up Sid (2009). All the songs are played in the background without lip sync. Due to the themes and political issues in the film, Johar decided to avoid party numbers unlike his previous films, adding that "there's guts, soul and heart in the music".

Besides writing the dialogues, Iyengar additionally wrote lyrics for two songs: "Sajdaa" and "Allah Hi Rahem"; Akhtar was approached to write lyrics for the remaining songs but refused them citing his unwillingness to share credits. But with Johar's persuasion, Akhtar later agreed to write one song though his name not appeared in the film's credits. In a later interview, Akhtar mentioned on his refusal citing that his involvement would take away the attention of the other deserving lyricist; he added that, he had read the songs written by Iyengar and appreciated it.

On 14 June 2009, a burglary happened at the trio's studio in Mumbai, with the computers consisting of unrecorded tunes were stolen. However, their tunes for the film were left untouched.

== Release ==
The album was highly anticipated, after Johar's collaboration with Shankar–Ehsaan–Loy had provided successive results, with the music of Kal Ho Naa Ho and Kabhi Alvida Naa Kehna. Sony Music India acquired the film's music rights for an undisclosed price, as a part of the long-term deal with Dharma Productions. The soundtrack was released in the overseas markets on 5 January 2010, (Note: In the United States, most music albums were released on Tuesdays, in order to get the maximum number of sales covered until the weekend; later in early 2015, due to shift towards digital streaming and to counter piracy, new albums were released on Fridays.) while it was released in India a day later.

In iTunes, besides the songs from the film, the album further consisted of four additional songs taken from Karan Johar's previous films. A deluxe edition, which consisted of the Lo-fi flip versions of "Sajdaa" and "Noor-E-Khuda", produced by Deepanshu Ruhela and Lo-fi 2307 were released on 12 February 2023.

== Reception ==
=== Critical ===
The soundtrack received positive reviews from music critics. Joginder Tuteja of Bollywood Hungama wrote My Name Is Khan's music does not has the romantic nature that is usual in Karan Johar's films, mainly Kuch Kuch Hota Hai, and gave it a rating of three out of five stars. Ruchika Kher of Hindustan Times concluded, "On the whole, every song in the album is above-average. The composers have stuck to the theme of the film and the soundtrack has the potential to rock the charts." According to Chris Nickson of AllMusic, "It's Indian music lite, all very classy and polished but ultimately lacking in soul, which is one quality the film appears to possess. More than anything, the ten tracks here function as background music, since they're not especially arresting."

Sukanya Verma of Rediff.com found the music to have strong Sufi feels, opining that "it's neither fancy nor groundbreaking but warm enough to make us like it". Writing for the BBC, Jaspreet Pandohar described the soundtrack as a "mellow, spiritually-uplifting musical experience", while Kumar Saurav of Mid-Day noted "the six-track album is worth occasional listening, but certainly not the soul-stirrer you were expecting".

Upon revisiting the album in 2023, Saaya Vaidya in her column for Film Companion described it as "a masterclass in the art of weaving together songs that explore similar themes. The songs and melodies seem to speak to one another — if one raises a question, another answers it."

=== Commercial ===
The Billboard magazine reported that it sold 150,000 units four days after its launch in India only and proved to be a commercial success. The Indo-Asian News Service included "Sajda" in their listing of 10 greatest Bollywood songs of 2010.

== Track listing ==
My Name Is Khan (Original Motion Picture Soundtrack) — CD
No.	Title	Singer(s)	Length
1.	"Sajdaa"	Rahat Fateh Ali Khan, Shankar Mahadevan, Richa Sharma	06:05
2.	"Noor-E-Khuda"	Adnan Sami, Shreya Ghoshal, Shankar Mahadevan	06:37
3.	"Tere Naina"	Shafqat Amanat Ali	04:38
4.	"Allah Hi Rahem"	Rashid Khan	04:01
5.	"Khan Theme"	—	02:43
6.	"Rang De"	Suraj Jagan	03:45
Total length:			27:51

My Name Is Khan (Original Motion Picture Soundtrack) — iTunes
No.	Title	Singer(s)	Length
7.	"Kuch Kuch Hota Hai"	Udit Narayan, Alka Yagnik	04:57
8.	"Suraj Hua Maddham"	Sonu Nigam, Alka Yagnik	07:08
9.	"Kal Ho Naa Ho"	Sonu Nigam	05:21
10.	"Kabhi Alvida Naa Kehna"	Sonu Nigam, Alka Yagnik	08:03
Total length:			53:29

My Name Is Khan (Original Motion Picture Soundtrack) — Deluxe edition
No.	Title	Singer(s)	Length
7.	"Sajda" (Lo-fi Flip)	Deepanshu Ruhela, Rahat Fateh Ali Khan, Shankar Mahadevan, Richa Sharma	02:08
8.	"Noor-E-Khuda" (Lo-fi Flip)	Lo-fi 2307, Shreya Ghoshal, Shankar Mahadevan, Adnan Sami	03:01
Total length:			33:01

== Awards and nominations ==
Award	Date of ceremony (Note: Date is linked to the article about the awards held that year, wherever possible.)	Category	Recipient(s) and nominee(s)	Result	Ref.
BIG Star Entertainment Awards	21 December 2010	Most Entertaining Song	"Sajda"	Nominated	
BIG Star Entertainment Awards	21 December 2010	Most Entertaining Singer – Male	Shafqat Amanat Ali for "Tere Naina"	Nominated	
BIG Star Entertainment Awards	21 December 2010	Most Entertaining Singer – Female	Richa Sharma for "Sajda"	Nominated	
BIG Star Entertainment Awards	21 December 2010	Most Entertaining Music	Shankar–Ehsaan–Loy	Won	
Filmfare Awards	29 January 2011	Best Music Director	Shankar–Ehsaan–Loy	Nominated	
Filmfare Awards	29 January 2011	Best Lyricist	Niranjan Iyengar for "Noor-E-Khuda"	Nominated	
Filmfare Awards	29 January 2011	Best Lyricist	Niranjan Iyengar for "Sajda"	Nominated	
Filmfare Awards	29 January 2011	Best Male Playback Singer	Adnan Sami, Shankar Mahadevan for "Noor-E-Khuda"	Nominated	
Filmfare Awards	29 January 2011	Best Male Playback Singer	Rahat Fateh Ali Khan for "Sajda"	Nominated	
Filmfare Awards	29 January 2011	Best Female Playback Singer	Shreya Ghoshal for "Noor-E-Khuda"	Nominated	
International Indian Film Academy Awards	23–25 June 2011	Best Lyricist	Niranjan Iyengar for "Sajda"	Won	
International Indian Film Academy Awards	23–25 June 2011	Best Music Director	Shankar–Ehsaan–Loy	Nominated	
International Indian Film Academy Awards	23–25 June 2011	Best Background Score	Shankar–Ehsaan–Loy	Won	
Mirchi Music Awards	27 January 2011	Best Programmer and Arranger	Shankar–Ehsaan–Loy for "Noor-E-Khuda"	Won	
Mirchi Music Awards	27 January 2011	Best song in Sufi Tradition	"Sajda"	Won	
Mirchi Music Awards	27 January 2011	Best Song of The Year – Listener's Choice	"Sajda"	Nominated	
Mirchi Music Awards	27 January 2011	Best Song of The Year – Listener's Choice	"Tere Naina"	Nominated	
Mirchi Music Awards	27 January 2011	Best Album of The Year – Listener's Choice	My Name Is Khan	Nominated	
Mirchi Music Awards	27 January 2011	Song of The Year	"Sajda"	Nominated	
Mirchi Music Awards	27 January 2011	Song of The Year	"Tere Naina"	Nominated	
Mirchi Music Awards	27 January 2011	Best Album of The Year	My Name Is Khan	Nominated	
Mirchi Music Awards	27 January 2011	Male Vocalist of The Year	Rahat Fateh Ali Khan and Shankar Mahadevan for "Sajdaa"	Nominated	
Mirchi Music Awards	27 January 2011	Female Vocalist of The Year	Richa Sharma for "Sajdaa"	Nominated	
Mirchi Music Awards	27 January 2011	Music Composer of The Year	Shankar-Ehsaan-Loy for "Sajdaa"	Nominated	
Mirchi Music Awards	27 January 2011	Lyricist of The Year	Niranjan Iyengar for "Sajdaa"	Nominated	
Mirchi Music Awards	27 January 2011	Lyricist of The Year	Niranjan Iyengar for "Tere Naina"	Nominated	
Mirchi Music Awards	27 January 2011	Raag-Inspired Song of the Year	"Sajdaa"	Nominated	
Mirchi Music Awards	27 January 2011	Best Background Score of the Year	Shankar-Ehsaan-Loy	Nominated	
Producers Guild Film Awards	12 January 2011	Best Music Director	Shankar–Ehsaan–Loy	Nominated	
Producers Guild Film Awards	12 January 2011	Best Male Playback Singer	Shafqat Amanat Ali for "Tere Naina"	Nominated	
Producers Guild Film Awards	12 January 2011	Best Female Playback Singer	Richa Sharma for "Sajda"	Nominated	
Producers Guild Film Awards	12 January 2011	Best Lyricist	Niranjan Iyengar for "Tere Naina"	Nominated	
Screen Awards	6 January 2011	Best Music Director	Shankar–Ehsaan–Loy	Won	
Screen Awards	6 January 2011	Best Background Music	Shankar–Ehsaan–Loy	Nominated	
Screen Awards	6 January 2011	Best Male Playback	Adnan Sami, Shankar Mahadevan for "Noor-E-Khuda"	Nominated	
Screen Awards	6 January 2011	Best Male Playback	Rahat Fateh Ali Khan for "Sajda"	Nominated	
Screen Awards	6 January 2011	Best Male Playback	Shafqat Amanat Ali for "Tere Naina"	Nominated	
Screen Awards	6 January 2011	Best Female Playback	Shreya Ghoshal for "Noor-E-Khuda"	Nominated	
Screen Awards	6 January 2011	Best Lyricist	Niranjan Iyengar for "Noor-E-Khuda"	Nominated	
Screen Awards	6 January 2011	Best Lyricist	Niranjan Iyengar for "Sajda"	Nominated	
Zee Cine Awards	14 January 2011	Best Playback Singer – Female	Richa Sharma for "Sajda"	Won	
