= English Vinglish (soundtrack) =

English Vinglish (Original Motion Picture Soundtrack)

Soundtrack album by Amit Trivedi
- Released: 1 September 2012
- Recorded: 2012
- Genre: Feature film soundtrack
- Length: 28:47
- Languages: Hindi; Tamil; Telugu
- Labels: T-Series; Eros Music
- Producer: Amit Trivedi

Amit Trivedi chronology
Ishaqzaade (2012)	English Vinglish (Original Motion Picture Soundtrack) (2012)	Aiyyaa (2012)

English Vinglish (Original Motion Picture Soundtrack) is the soundtrack to the 2012 film of the same name, written and directed by Gauri Shinde, starring Sridevi. The film's music and background score were composed by Amit Trivedi and lyrics were written by Swanand Kirkire; lyrics for the Tamil and Telugu versions were written by Pa. Vijay and Krishna Chaitanya, respectively. The album was released through T-Series and Eros Music on 1 September 2012.

== Background ==
Amit Trivedi composed the score and soundtrack for English Vinglish in his maiden collaboration with Gauri Shinde. The music for the film has been influenced by Marathi flavor, which was rare in mainstream Bollywood cinema. Trivedi composed mostly melody numbers, refraining from traditional item numbers, remixes and techno-mix of yesteryear hits, so that it should stay true to the essence for the film. Natalie Di Luccio performed a wedding number with Marathi lyrics.

== Critical reception ==
A review from IBNlive.in rated the soundtrack 3.5/5 stating, "Although the English Vinglish album lacks the lustre of new age Bollywood albums, it manages to leave the listener smiling with its simple approach." Jaspreet Pandohar of BBC reviewed "Having delivered hit albums like Ishaqzaade, Ek Main Aur Ekk Tu and Dev.D, Trivedi proves here that he's a talent unafraid of experimenting." Joginder Tuteja of Bollywood Hungama rated 3 out of 5 stars stating, "The music of English Vinglish does well in creating added perception about the film and only lends further weight to this Sridevi-starrer."

Suparna Thombare of BollywoodLife rated the soundtrack 3 out of 5 stars, stating "The music is situational and an integral part of the movie. English Vinglish is sweet-weet, cool-shool and fun-vun! Give it a listen!" Aarti Kapur of Koimoi rated 3 out of 5 stars "Overall, the music of the album is good with varied shades of emotions that include colors of celebration and 'masti'. Despite lacking a commercial chartbuster, the album still does well in holding your attention with Swanand Kirkire's lyrics aptly supporting compositions by Amit Trivedi." Raj Baddhan of BizAsia Live rated the album 8 out of 10 stating, "Trivedi once again stamps his innovative genius all over this six-track album".

Vipin Nair of Music Aloud rated the album 7/10 and wrote: "Not in the same league as Ishaqzaade or his Coke Studio episode, but a neat score from Amit Trivedi, led from the front by 'Gustakh Dil' and 'Dhak Dhuk'." Karthik Srinivasan of Milliblog reviewed it as a competent soundtrack from Amit Trivedi. Anand Vaishnav of IndiaTimes wrote "while Amit Trivedi sticks to his familiar territory, the songs have the potential to work reasonably well, if placed and utilized well in the plot."

== Track listing ==
=== Hindi ===
All lyrics are written by Swanand Kirkire; all music is composed by Amit Trivedi.

English Vinglish (Original Motion Picture Soundtrack) Hindi track listing
No.	Title	Artist(s)	Length
1.	"English Vinglish" (female)	Shilpa Rao	4:34
2.	"Manhattan"	Clinton Cerejo, Bianca Gomes	4:36
3.	"Gustakh Dil"	Shilpa Rao	5:39
4.	"Navrai Majhi"	Sunidhi Chauhan, Swanand Kirkire, Natalie Di Luccio, Neelambari Kirkire	4:23
5.	"Dhak Dhuk"	Amit Trivedi	5:03
6.	"English Vinglish" (male)	Amit Trivedi	4:32
Total length:			28:47

=== Tamil ===
All lyrics are written by Pa. Vijay; all music is composed by Amit Trivedi.

English Vinglish (Original Motion Picture Soundtrack) Tamil track listing
No.	Title	Artist(s)	Length
1.	"English Vinglish" (female)	Shilpa Rao	4:34
2.	"Manhattan"	Benny Dayal, Bianca Gomes	4:36
3.	"Alai Payuthe"	Hamsika Iyer	5:39
4.	"Ummachchi Ummachchi"	Sneha Suresh, Vijay Prakash, Chandana Bala, Lavanya Padmanabhan	4:23
5.	"Dhikku Dhikku"	Benny Dayal	5:03
6.	"English Vinglish" (male)	Benny Dayal	4:32
Total length:			28:47

=== Telugu ===
All lyrics are written by Krishna Chaitanya; all music is composed by Amit Trivedi.

English Vinglish (Original Motion Picture Soundtrack) Telugu track listing
No.	Title	Artist(s)	Length
1.	"English Vinglish" (female)	Shilpa Rao	4:34
2.	"Manhattan"	Benny Dayal, Bianca Gomes	4:36
3.	"Idho Vidham"	Shilpa Rao	5:39
4.	"Garala Patti"	Sneha Suresh, Vijay Prakash, Chandana Bala, Lavanya Padmanabhan	4:23
5.	"Uliki Padenule"	Benny Dayal	5:03
6.	"English Vinglish" (male)	Benny Dayal	4:32
Total length:			28:47
