= Ghanchakkar (film) =

2013 Indian film by Raj Kumar Gupta

- Theatrical release poster
- Directed by: Raj Kumar Gupta
- Written by: Parveez Shaikh; Rajkumar Gupta
- Story by: Parveez Shaikh
- Produced by: Ronnie Screwvala; Siddharth Roy Kapur
- Starring: Emraan Hashmi; Vidya Balan
- Cinematography: Satyajit Pande (Setu); Polly Morgan
- Edited by: Aarti Bajaj
- Music by: Amit Trivedi
- Production company: UTV Motion Pictures
- Distributed by: UTV Motion Pictures
- Release date: 28 June 2013
- Running time: 137 minutes
- Country: India
- Language: Hindi
- Box office: ₹34 crore

Ghanchakkar (transl. Crazy) is a 2013 Indian Hindi-language heist comedy film directed by Raj Kumar Gupta and produced by Ronnie Screwvala and Siddharth Roy Kapur under UTV Motion Pictures. The film stars Emraan Hashmi and Vidya Balan in the lead roles. The film was released on 28 June 2013 to mixed reviews from critics.

== Plot ==
Sanju is an expert safecracker who leads a carefree lifestyle with his wife, Neetu. He meets two criminals, Pandit and Idris, who offer him the opportunity to assist in a bank robbery. They promise that if the heist is successful, he will never have to worry about money again, and Sanju accepts the offer.

The three thieves successfully steal ₹30 crore. Following the robbery, Pandit decides that Sanju should hide the suitcase containing the money, as Pandit and Idris already have criminal records and are more likely to be suspected by the police. Since Sanju is married and considered less suspicious, they agree that he should keep the money hidden. They plan to meet after three months and divide the money among themselves.

Three months later, Pandit and Idris discover that Sanju has suffered a head injury in an accident and developed retrograde amnesia. Unable to remember where he hid the money, Sanju becomes a liability. Pandit and Idris decide that they cannot trust him and remain at Sanju and Neetu's house to keep him under observation and prevent him from disappearing with the money. They give him a week to recover his memory and reveal its location.

Sanju repeatedly attempts to remember where he hid the money but is unsuccessful. When he learns that his college friend Uttam Nagpal (Parvin Dabas) has suddenly become a millionaire, apparently after winning a lottery, he begins to suspect him of having the money. He later suspects Neetu of knowing its whereabouts, as they share a joint bank account and she has sole access to their bank locker. Sanju accuses her of conspiring with Uttam.

Sanju subsequently learns that Uttam has moved to London after being questioned abou

== Cast ==
- Emraan Hashmi as Sanjay 'Sanju' Athray
- Vidya Balan as Neetu Athray
- Rajesh Sharma as Pandit
- Namit Das as Idris
- Parvin Dabas as Uttam Nagpal
- Vikram Kochhar as prostitute
- Shashank Shende as Baba
- Shubhrajyoti Barat as the unknown person who kills Idris and Pandit in the train
- Sunil Vishrani as the recurring common man on the train station, from whom Idris regularly takes vegetables and prevents from sitting in their compartment.

== Soundtrack ==
Ghanchakkar

Soundtrack album by Amit Trivedi
- Released: May 2013
- Genre: Feature film soundtrack
- Language: Hindi
- Labels: UTV Music; Sony Music
- Producer: Amit Trivedi

Amit Trivedi chronology
Lootera (2013)	Ghanchakkar (2013)	Queen (2013)

The soundtrack was composed by Amit Trivedi, with lyrics written by Amitabh Bhattacharya.

=== Track listing ===
All lyrics are written by Amitabh Bhattacharya.

No.	Title	Artist(s)	Length
1.	"Lazy Lad"	Richa Sharma	3:13
2.	"Allah Meherbaan"	Divya Kumar, Amit Trivedi	2:51
3.	"Ghanchakkar Babu"	Amit Trivedi	2:12
4.	"Jholu Ram"	Altaf Raja	2:15
5.	"Ghanchakkar Babu (Remix)"	Amit Trivedi, Rahul Gupta	3:52

== Reception ==
=== Critical response ===
Raja Sen of Rediff.com said that the film "stops being funny somewhere through the second half". The critic continued: "Vidya Balan, in particular, deserves to be singled out for applause simply because of her willingness as a leading lady to take on a role this farcical. One time watch only for Vidya Balan." He gave the film only 2 out of a possible 5 stars.

Mohammad Kamran Jawaid from the Dawn gave Ghanchakkar a positive review, stating that Vidya Balan "gets the short end of the stick" and is "a few hundred miles away from any original appeal". He notes that the film's "big reveal" is hardly a revelation. And as frightening as the hoodlums want themselves to appear, their sense of menace never surfaces the way it ought to. Also, their good-cop, bad-cop attitude gets old fast, and we never get to know much about them. However, these minor grumbles are just that – minor grumbles".

A reviewer for The Times of India gave a rating of 3.5 out of 5 and wrote "Of the talent-Emraan gets his bewildered expression correct. And for fear of losing it, he keeps it going for the most part. Vidya provides a few laughs trying to ape the Punjabi stereotype. However, her act doesn't qualify for the real thing."

Sudhish Kamath of The Hindu stated "Ghanchakkar almost succeeds too. But sadly, though it is fun as you watch it unfold, it is also mostly forgettable, offering us very few moments to hold on to."

=== Box office ===
Ghanchakkar earned ₹7.2 crore on its opening day.
