= Queen (soundtrack) =

Soundtrack album by Amit Trivedi
- Released: 23 January 2014 (iTunes); 25 January 2014 (Digital); 5 February 2014 (CD)
- Recorded: 2013–2014
- Venue: Mumbai
- Studio: AT Studios, Nysa Digital Studios
- Genre: Pop; Rock; Bhangra; Electronic; Filmi; Punjabi Folk; Sugam
- Length: 31:35
- Label: T-Series; Saregama (Hungama Ho Gaya)
- Producer: Amit Trivedi

Amit Trivedi chronology
Lootera (2013)	Queen (2014)	Bombay Velvet (2014)
External audio
- Audio Jukebox on YouTube

Queen is the soundtrack album by Amit Trivedi, to the 2014 Hindi film Queen directed by Vikas Bahl and starring Kangana Ranaut in lead role. The album features eight tracks in a different array of genres. It was released digitally on 25 January 2014, with an exclusive release in iTunes on 23 January 2014. A physical release was held on 5 February 2014 at the Kala Ghoda Arts Festival in Mumbai, attended by the cast and crew of the film and preceded by Trivedi's performance.

== Background ==
Trivedi travelled to European cities like Amsterdam and Paris in search of inspiration for the album, while also working on four different film projects at the time. The album received positive reviews from critics. All the tracks are composed by Trivedi and written by Anvita Dutt, with the exception of "Ranjha" written by Raghu Nath, composed by Rupesh Kumar Ram and the producer of the film Anurag Kashyap.

== Development ==
Amit Trivedi composed the music soundtrack simultaneously working on four other ones like Ghanchakkar, Lootera, Bombay Talkies and Kusar Prasad Ka Bhoot in a time span of 5 months. The film based on a woman's self-discovery while travelling; Trivedi also travelled to Europe in Amsterdam, the film's shooting location so that he could understand the vibe and musical demand of the place in accordance with the local philosophy of "free living [..] especially in their [European] nightclubs". During the visit he also spent time in Paris and bonded with the locals there while working over music. Trivedi completed Ghanchakkar and Lootera before Queen.

The last track, Ranjha composed by Rupesh Kumar Ram, a composer from Simla; discovered by Anurag Kashyap and used in the soundtrack with few arrangements made by Trivedi. An additional track was released on 1 March 2014, it was the remixed version of hit cabaret number of the 1970s Hungama Ho Gaya sung by Asha Bhosle for the film, Anhonee (1973) was remixed by Amit Trivedi for the film, with additional vocals by Arijit Singh. It was shot at Club NL, in Amsterdam, where a Bollywood number was played for the first time.

The copyright of the soundtrack was purchased by T-Series; long-time collaborator of Viacom 18 Motion Pictures, the distributor of the film, in March 2013 along with that of few other films.

== Release ==
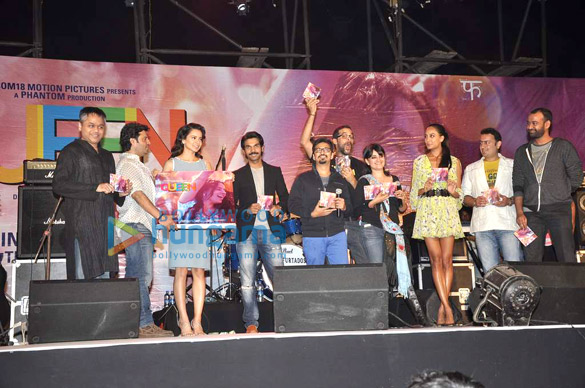
Trivedi along with the cast members at the music release of the film at the Kala Ghoda Arts Festival in Cross Maidan, Mumbai.

The first track, London Thumakda, a wedding song and dance number was released on Viacom18 Motion Pictures official YouTube channel on 6 January 2014; followed by Badra Bahar released on 10 January 2014, and O Gujariya on 13 January 2014 respectively. The album was released exclusively on iTunes on 23 January 2014, followed by a release on all streaming platforms on 25 January 2014. The music album was physically released on 5 February 2014 at the Kala Ghoda Arts Festival in Mumbai and is an official part of the festival. Preceding the launch was, Trvidei's first live stage performance along with his livewire team at Cross Maidan including Queen's songs. The entire cast of the film along with the director were present at the launch.

== Reception ==
The album received mostly positive reviews. In MusicAlouds review, the soundtrack was described as one that "treads familiar soundscapes and yet produces an engaging set of songs". Rajiv Vijayankar for Bollywood Hungama passed the album as "pleasant album by Amit Trivedi" picking London Thumakda, Badra bahaar and Harjaiyaan as the best of the eight tracks. Mohar Basu stated in her review for Koimoi that "Every song in this album is a winner in its own right. Amit Trivedi is unusual and is known to create his own norm by refusing to fall into any random moulds of stereotypical understanding. Once again after last year's poetry in music, Trivedi has evolved another album that matches the marvel expected of him. Giving us amusing, delightful, enthralling composition Trivedi's memorable music from Queen wins my heart. I am going with a 4/5 and wishes that [sic] Trivedi is more frequent in the commercial music scenario".

== Charts ==
Two songs, Jugni and Kinare from the soundtrack debuted at number 10 and eight at Planet Bollywood Top 10 chart. The album itself debuted at number ten on the iTunes India Top 100 Indian chart. The album ranked number four on the "Top 5 Albums of the year" list compiled by The Times of India.

== Track listing ==
All lyrics are written by Anvita Dutt except where noted; all music is composed by Amit Trivedi except where noted.

Queen (Original Motion Picture Soundtrack)
No.	Title	Singer(s)	Length
1.	"London Thumakda"	Labh Janjua, Sonu Kakkar, Neha Kakkar	3:50
2.	"Badra Bahaar"	Amit Trivedi	3:34
3.	"O Gujariya"	Shefali Alvares, Nikhil D'Souza	4:21
4.	"Taake Jhanke"	Arijit Singh	4:49
5.	"Jugni"	Amit Trivedi	4:22
6.	"Harjaiyaan"	Nandini Srikar	4:47
7.	"Kinare"	Mohan Kanan	3:32
8.	"Ranjha" (Lyrics: Raghunath Singh; Composer: Rupesh Kumar Ram)	Rupesh Kumar Ram	2:19
9.	"Hungama Ho Gaya (Remix)" (Original Lyrics: Varma Malik; Original Composer: Laxmikant–Pyarelal; Label: Saregama)	Asha Bhosle, Arijit Singh	4:32
Total length:			36:10

== Personnel ==
Credits adapted from release notes.

Backing vocals— Sunny M.R., Neuman Pinto

Trumpet – Kishore Sodha
Drums – Darshan Doshi
Acoustic and Electric Guitars – Sanjay Das, Warren Mendosa
Acoustic Guitar – Nikhil Paul George
Bass guitar – Rushad Mistry
Saaz and Tumbi – Tapas Roy
Sitar –Asad Khan

Production

- Producers—

Executive producer: Krutee Trivedi (at A.T. Studios)
Supervising producer: Aashish Narula (at A.T. Studios)

- Mastering: Donal Whelan at Mastering World (United Kingdom)
- Mixing: Shadab Rayeen (at A.T. Studios)
- Engineers: Shadab Rayeen, Praveen Murlidhar, Harikrishnan R., Firoz Shaikh (at A.T. Studios)
- Session Supervisor: Sunny M.R.
- Programming: Amit Trivedi, Sourav Roy
