= United Six =

- Directed by: Mahesh bhatt
- Screenplay by: Mahesh bhatt Kapil Mishra
- Story by: Mahesh bhatt Kapil Mishra
- Produced by: C.G.Patel
- Starring: Parvathy Omanakuttan; Daisy Bopanna; Luna Lahkar; Mahi; Isha Batwe; Pooja Sharma
- Cinematography: Sugin Mamai
- Edited by: Mukesh Thakur
- Music by: Pritam
- Distributed by: White House Productions Limited
- Release date: 4 February 2011
- Country: India
- Language: Hindi

United Six is a Bollywood film directed by Mahesh Bhatt. Executive Producer Fenon J Rodriguez. The film stars Parvathy Omanakuttan, Daisy Bopanna, Pooja Sharma, Luna Lahkar, Mahi. The film has music by Pritam. The film is produced by C.G. Patel.

== Synopsis ==
United Six' is the story of six girls living in Bangkok. They are going through a tough phase in their lives. Their dreams have shattered, their aspirations crushed. In this situation, out of frustration and out of anger, they decide to rob a bank. One of the girls, Jia, who was fired from the bank for refusing to sleep with her boss, convinces the others and leads them.

They rent a bakery adjacent to the bank and start digging a tunnel, which would lead them to the strong room of the bank. They start digging and soon find that it's not as easy as it seemed like. However, they continue in their mission, and one by one, on one pretext or the other, the girls start getting jittery. Jia continues to motivate them but finds it getting more and more difficult with every passing hour. The meekest girl, Maddy, keeps talking negatively and attracts the ire from Jia.

As time flies by, everybody loses their zeal and forces Jia to call off the mission as they know that they don't have any mental or physical energy left.

Jia tries hard but is not able to convince the others to pursue the mission. And they decide to call it a quit.

Next morning they get the shock of their lives when they see the news on TV that the bank got robbed in the night and there is info that six girls are involved in the mission.

Girls are now in a strange situation. They don't have money, but the police are after them. The police start approaching them, and they start running from one place to the other. They have to reach the jetty, where a launch guy would wait for them to help them escape the country. In one night they have to arrange money to pay the launch guy as well as escape the police to safely reach there. In a roller coaster ride throughout the night, they escape the police but lose Maddy on the way. They reach the jetty without any money, hoping for some miracle to happen.

Somehow, Maddy manages to dig the tunnel and rob the bank all by herself, accomplishing what six people couldn't do together; she does it all on her own.

== Cast ==
- Parvathy Omanakuttan as Shaina Basu
- Daisy Bopanna as Jia Suri
- Luna Lahkar as Maddy
- Mahi as Tia
- Isha Batwe as Candy
- Pooja Sharma as Tootsie
- Russell Geoffrey Banks as News reporter

== Soundtrack ==
The music is composed by Pritam. Lyrics are penned by Ashish Pandit.

United Six

Soundtrack album by Pritam
- Released: 2011
- Genre: Film soundtrack
- Producer: Pritam

Pritam chronology
Dil Toh Baccha Hai Ji (2010)	United Six (2011)	Thank You (2011)

No.	Title	Lyrics	Performer(s)	Length
1.	"Booty Shake"	Ashish Pandit	Sunidhi Chauhan, Style Bhai	3:39
2.	"Give It Up"	Ashish Pandit	Monali Thakur, Suzanne D'Mello	4:38
3.	"Waha Bhai Waa"	Ashish Pandit	Anushka Manchanda, Bob	4:16
4.	"You Are The Reason"	Ashish Pandit	Neeraj Shridhar, Ritu Pathak	4:44
5.	"Waha Bhai Waa - Remix"	Ashish Pandit	Anushka Manchanda, Bob	3:41
