= Bhai Tera Star Hai =

Indian Hindi-language comedy film

- Directed by: Vivek Agrawal
- Written by: Vivek Agrawal; Sudipto Sarkar
- Produced by: Vivek B. Agrawal; Avantika Hari-Agrawal; Sunil Rupani
- Starring: Raghav Juyal; Sanjay Kapoor; Niki Aneja Walia; Niharika NM; Barkha Singh; Vivan Bhatena; Vikalp Mehta; Parvathy Omanakuttan; Tina Desai; Chandan Roy Sanyal
- Cinematography: Tribhuvan Babu Sadineni
- Music by: Amit Trivedi (music); Kumaar (lyrics); Shivam Sengupta & Anuj Danait (score)
- Production companies: Eastwood Pictures; Indian Stories2
- Distributed by: PVR Inox Pictures
- Release date: 30 July 2026
- Country: India
- Language: Hindi

Bhai Tera Star Hai is a 2026 Indian Hindi-language comedy film directed by Vivek Agrawal and written by Vivek Agrawal and Sudipto Sarkar. The film stars Raghav Juyal in the lead role and features an ensemble cast including Sanjay Kapoor, Niharika NM, Barkha Singh, Vivaan Bhatena, Vikalp Mehta, Parvathy Omanakuttan, Tina Desai and Chandan Roy Sanyal. It was released in theatres on 30 July 2026.

Produced by Eastwood Pictures and Indian Stories2, the film began principal photography in 2026 and was released theatrically on 30 July 2026.

== Premise ==
An actor gets into a problem after losing a lot of money betting on cricket. To escape the debt he makes up a story, about his sister.. The lie doesn’t help. Instead it makes everything worse. That night he ends up in the middle of criminals botched plans and total chaos all over London..

== Cast ==
- Raghav Juyal as Ajay Singh
- Sanjay Kapoor
- Niki Aneja
- Niharika NM
- Barkha Singh
- Vivaan Bhatena
- Vikalp Mehta
- Parvathy Omanakuttan as Ajay's Sister
- Tina Desai
- Chandan Roy Sanyal
- Vineeth Kumar
- Naser Al Azzeh
- Dev Agrawal

== Production ==
Principal photography took place in early 2026 with filming occurring across various locations in London. The project was developed as an ensemble comedy. The film was released theatrically on 30 July 2026.

== Critical reception ==
As of 2 August 2026, the film did not even cross Rs. 1 crore as box office collection.

Reviewing the film for India TV News, a critic noted that despite an interesting premise and an energetic lead, the film suffered from poor writing that failed to utilize Juyal's talents. The Hollywood Reporter India echoed this sentiment, describing the film as "memorable for how forgettable it is" and noting the lead actor was wasted in the role.

Cinema Express described the project as "too wacky for its own good," while The Indian Express stated the film provided very few laughs. The Federal concluded that the film "promises a lot, delivers little," describing it as an experiment that lost its narrative grip. Despite labeling it a "chaotic and unfunny comedy," Bollywood Hungama highlighted NM for having an "arresting screen presence."
