= Shirin Guha =

Indian actress

Swachata Sanjiban Guha
- Born: Swachhatoa Guha; Ichapore, West Bengal
- Occupation: Actor
- Years active: 2013–present
- Relatives: Sanjiban Guha

Swachata Sanjiban Guha, born Swachhatoa Guha, also known as Shirin Guha, is an Indian actress from Kolkata, West Bengal, now based in New Jersey. She made her Bollywood debut with Lootera (2013).

== Early life and background ==
Swachata Guha originates from Ichapore, West Bengal. Her father Sanjiban Guha is an actor in Bengali film industry. She holds a 1st class hons graduate in drama from the Rabindra Bharati University and post graduate diploma in acting and film making from Film and Television Institute of India (FTII), Pune, graduating in 2011. She hails from a strong theatre background. She is currently married to Sudipta Mallik and lives in New Jersey.

== Career ==
Guha has been a professional script-writer for Zee Bangla and journalist for ABP News. She is a trained dancer and made her Bollywood début with Hindi feature film Lootera (2013), directed by Vikramaditya Motwane. She has also appeared in the episode Kabuliwala in the television show Stories by Rabindranath Tagore, directed by Anurag Basu; the short film Khaney Mein Kya Hain; and the English play GIANT. During the COVID-19 pandemic, she appeared in the global cast of The Show Must Go Online, a YouTube live theatre show.

== Filmography ==
- Light Shade Red (2012)
- Lootera (2013)
- Jab Tum Kaho (2016)
- Stories by Rabindranath Tagore (2015)
- Khaney Mein Kya Hain (2017)
- Giants (2018–2019)
- The Show Must Go Online (2020)
- The Marriage Proposal (2021)
