= Dear Zindagi (soundtrack) =

Soundtrack album by Amit Trivedi
- Released: 4 November 2016
- Studios: A T Studios, Mumbai
- Genre: Feature film soundtrack
- Length: 39:03
- Language: Hindi
- Label: Sony Music
- Producer: Amit Trivedi

Amit Trivedi chronology
Udta Punjab (2016)	Dear Zindagi (2016)	Qaidi Band (2017)
External audio
- Jukebox on YouTube

Dear Zindagi is the soundtrack album to the 2016 film of the same name directed by Gauri Shinde, who co-produced it with Gauri Khan and Karan Johar under Red Chillies Entertainment, Dharma Productions and Hope Productions, starring Alia Bhatt and Shah Rukh Khan. The film's soundtrack featured eight songs composed by Amit Trivedi and lyrics written by Kausar Munir. The album was released through Sony Music India on 4 November 2016.

== Background ==
Dear Zindagi is Trivedi's second collaboration with Shinde after English Vinglish (2012). The soundtrack featured eight songs with the lyrics of Kausar Munir. Jasleen Royal, Trivedi, Sunidhi Chauhan, Arijit Singh, Vishal Dadlani and Bhatt have recorded their vocals for the film's soundtrack.

Ali Zafar had initially recorded two songs: "Tu Hi Hai" and "Taarefon Se". Despite reports of his replacement, which resurfaced after a ban imposed on Pakistani actors by Maharashtra Navnirman Sena, following tensions created due to the 2016 Uri terror attack, were denied by Bhatt, his songs were instead dubbed by Singh for the film's soundtrack. Critic Subhash K. Jha admitted that it was Johar's decision, since he faced a similar issue with Fawad Khan's casting in Ae Dil Hai Mushkil (2016), and wanted the film to not face any such controversies afterwards.

The song "Ae Zindagi Gale Laga Le"; written by Gulzar and was originally composed by Ilaiyaraaja and sung by Suresh Wadkar for Sadma (1983); has been recreated for the film. It had two versions, one sung by Singh and the other by Bhatt.

== Release ==
In October 2016, Sony Music India acquired the film's music rights. The song "Love You Zindagi" was released on 20 October, after it was teased in the film's teaser trailer which released prior. The second single "Just Go To Hell Dil" was released on 30 October. The soundtrack was released under the Sony Music India label on 4 November, with the audio jukebox was released on 10 November on YouTube.

After the album's release, the song "Tu Hi Hai" was released on 18 November. It was followed by "Ae Zindagi Gale Laga Re (Take 1)" on 22 November, Bhatt's version of "Love You Zindagi (Club Mix)" on 28 November, and "Ae Zindagi Gale Laga Re (Take 2)" on 15 November. Zafar's version of "Tu Hi Hai" and "Taarefon Se" were officially shared online later.

== Reception ==
Suanshu Khurana and of The Indian Express described it as "A fresh and enthusiastic set, with life's tales told in a breezy fashion. The album lacks variance, yet, it manages to have many sparkling moments." A. Kameshwari, in her review for the same publication, called it as "Sensible and relatable songs making the album simplistic that automatically gets registered at the back of your mind, a poetic version of our exact feelings." Joginder Tuteja of Bollywood Hungama, rating the music album a 3.5 out of 5 stars, said that it was "a series of situational songs that should sound good in the film's narrative." Rinky Kumar of The Times of India rated 3 stars to the album, saying, "this movie doesn't have songs that have a high recall value."

Rohit Mehrotra of The Quint wrote "Minimal experimentation and dull tunes might get some appreciation due to pretty faces who will enact them on screen but as an album, Dear Zindagi doesn't score high and remains yet another underwhelming effort by the composer who is capable of much more." Swetha Ramakrishnan of Firstpost described it as "an easy-going, partly melodious soundtrack, which Arijit Singh owns." Devansh Sharma of Filmfare rated 3 out of 5, stars calling it as "a mixed bag" where "the tunes have a sense of being a tad predictable." Sankhayan Ghosh of Mint wrote "Dear Zindagi features everything from an uninspired Trivedi to moments that bring the best out of the composer [...] the lighter, casual songs are much more original and enjoyable than the others: a simple truth the promos seem to have completely missed."

Kausar Munir received a nomination for Filmfare Award for Best Lyricist at the 62nd Filmfare Awards.

== Track listing ==
No.	Title	Singer(s)	Length
1.	"Love You Zindagi"	Jasleen Royal, Amit Trivedi	3:52
2.	"Tu Hi Hai"	Arijit Singh, Amit Trivedi	3:19
3.	"Taarefon Se"	Arijit Singh	4:38
4.	"Just Go To Hell Dil"	Sunidhi Chauhan, Amit Trivedi	5:35
5.	"Lets Break Up"	Vishal Dadlani	4:05
6.	"Love You Zindagi" (Club Mix)	Alia Bhatt	3:34
7.	"Ae Zindagi Gale Laga Le" (Take 1)	Arijit Singh	2:51
8.	"Ae Zindagi Gale Laga Le" (Take 2)	Alia Bhatt	3:05
Total length:			31:03

Other tracks
No.	Title	Singer(s)	Length
9.	"Tu Hi Hai" (Ali Zafar Version)	Ali Zafar	3:21
