= Parvathy Omanakuttan =

Indian actress

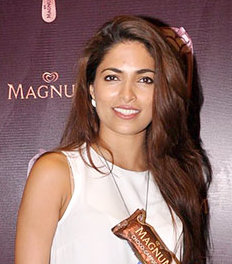
- Omanakuttan in 2015
- Born: Changanassery, Kottayam, Kerala, India
- Occupations: Actress, Model, Entrepreneur
- Beauty pageant titleholder
- Title: Femina Miss India World 2008; Miss India South 2008
- Hair color: Dark Brown
- Eye color: Dark Brown
- Major competitions: Miss India South 2008 (Winner) (Miss Beautiful Hair) (Best Catwalk); Femina Miss India World 2008 (Winner) (Miss Photogenic) (Miss Beautiful Hair) (Miss Personality); Miss World 2008 (1st Runner Up) (Miss World Asia & Oceania)

Parvathy Omanakuttan also known as Parvathy Nair, is an Indian actress, model and beauty pageant titleholder who was crowned Femina Miss India World 2008 and represented India at Miss World 2008 where she was crowned as Miss World 2008 Runner Up. She was also awarded the titles of Miss World Asia & Oceania at the competition.

== Biography ==
Parvathy Omanakuttan was born in a Malayali family to Omanakuttan Pillai and Sreekala from Changanacherry, Kerala and brought up in Mumbai. She attended Sheth Chunnilal Damodardas Barfiwala High School and later graduated in English Literature from Mithibai College.

== Pageant history ==
=== Miss World 2008 ===
Parvathy represented India in the 58th Miss World held in Johannesburg, South Africa. On 13 December 2008, she was announced the First Runner Up of Miss World 2008 at The Grand Finale. It was the highest placement of any Indian delegate at the Miss World pageant since Priyanka Chopra's victory at Miss World 2000, until Manushi Chhillar won Miss World 2017. At the pageant, Parvathy also placed Second in the Top Model and Fifth place in the Beach Beauty sub-contests. She was also awarded the title of Miss World Asia and Oceania at the pageant.

=== Miss India 2008 ===
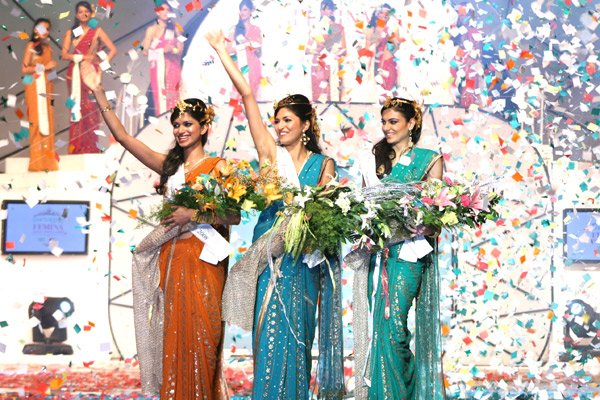
Parvathy (centre) winning Femina Miss India 2008

Parvathy was the winner of Femina Miss India 2008. Since the format of Miss India had changed from 2007, wherein the winner would represent the country at Miss World, Parvathy was conferred the title of Miss India World 2008 and represented the country at the most prestigious and biggest beauty pageant, Miss World. Parvathy also won the sub-titles of Miss Photogenic, Miss Personality, and Miss Beautiful Hair in the Femina Miss India 2008 pageant.

=== Miss India South 2008 ===
Parvathy was crowned the first ever Pantaloons Femina Miss India South 2008, at the Hyderabad International Convention Centre held in December 2007. Winning the PFMIS 2008 contest got her direct entry in the top ten finalists of the Pantaloons Femina Miss India 2008. She also won the sub-titles of Miss Beautiful Hair and Miss Best Catwalk in PFMIS 2008.

== Acting career ==
Parvathy made her cinematic debut through the Bollywood flick United Six directed by Vishal Aryan Singh. She eventually made her Tamil film debut in the 2012 gangster film Billa II, playing Jasmine who, she stated, was "the emotional quotient in David Billa's life". In 2013, she was seen in her first Malayalam film KQ, in which she played a journalist, "a woman of today, strong and independent with her own values". In August 2013 Parvathy started shooting for the Hindi film Pizza, a remake of the same-titled 2012 Tamil film, produced by Bejoy Nambiar and UTV which was directed by Akshay Akkineni. It released on 18 July 2014, it did very well at the box office.

== Filmography ==
Year	Film	Role	Language	Notes
2011	United Six	Shaina	Hindi	
2012	Billa II	Jasmine	Tamil	
2013	KQ	Sunaina	Malayalam	
2014	Pizza	Nikita	Hindi	
2016	Nambiar	Thaarani	Tamil	Cameo appearance
2016	Fear Factor: Khatron Ke Khiladi 7	Contestant	Hindi	Reality show
2018	Dobaara	Parvathy	Hindi	Short film
2026	Bhai Tera Star Hai	Natasha	Hindi	

Awards and achievements
Preceded by Sarah-Jane Dias	Femina Miss India World; 2008	Succeeded by Pooja Chopra
Preceded by (Angola) Micaela Reis	1st Runner-up Miss World; 2008	Succeeded by (Mexico) Perla Beltrán
Preceded by (China) Zhang Zilin	Miss World Asia & Oceania; 2008	Succeeded by (South Korea) Kim Joo-ri
