= Iktara (song) =

2009 song performed by Kavita Seth and Amitabh Bhattacharya

Song by Kavita Seth and Amitabh Bhattacharya

from the album Wake Up Sid
- Language: Hindi
- Released: 2009
- Recorded: 2008
- Length: 4:13
- Label: Sony Music India
- Composer: Amit Trivedi
- Lyricist: Javed Akhtar

Music video
- "Iktara" on YouTube

"Iktara" (transl. single-stringed instrument) is a song from the 2009 Hindi film Wake Up Sid, sung by Kavita Seth and Amitabh Bhattacharya. The song was written by Javed Akhtar and guest-composed by Amit Trivedi, who provided the film's background score.

"Iktara" received positive reception from audiences and is regarded as one of the best songs of Seth. Seth became so popular with the song that audiences wanted her to sing the song whenever she went for live concerts.

== Music video ==
The song is picturized upon Ranbir Kapoor and Konkona Sen Sharma, the lead cast of the film. It tells the story of Kapoor and Sharma gradually getting close to each other. The video shows Siddharth "Sid" Mehra (Ranbir Kapoor) doing many small things for Aisha Banerjee (Konkona Sen Sharma) in the spirit of friendship/love. Sharma falls in love with Kapoor.

== Critical reception ==
Upon the release of the song, it gained lots of appreciation for its music by critics and listeners alike. Joginder Tuteja of Bollywood Hungama described the song as a "soft number" and further said that "Seth's voice brings in a fresh appeal in the current Bollywood scene. Amitabh Bhattacharya is her partner in the song and he further enhances the overall effect that 'Iktara' manages to create." Chandrima Pal of Rediff.com liking the song described it as a "folksy number" and said that Seth's voice is intoxicating and earthy." A reviewer at Bangalore Mirror also liked the song and said that "the song has a compelling tune by guest composer Amit Trivedi, playing along gorgeous guitars, with marvellous vocals by Kavita Seth and Amitabh Bhattacharya. The Goonjasa hai koi iktara refrain is remarkable!"

== Accolades ==
"Iktara" won four awards. At the 55th ceremony of India's Filmfare Awards, the song won the Best Female Playback Singer award for Seth. The song also won at the 11th ceremony of India's IIFA Awards—Best Female Playback Singer for Seth. Seth also received the Best Female Playback award at the 16th ceremony of India's Screen Awards. It also received the Listeners' Choice Song of the Year award at the 2nd ceremony of India's Mirchi Music Awards.
