= Dev.D (soundtrack) =

Soundtrack album by Amit Trivedi
- Released: 31 December 2008
- Recorded: 2008
- Genre: Film soundtrack
- Length: 1:01:31
- Label: T-Series
- Producer: Amit Trivedi

Amit Trivedi chronology
Aamir (2008)	Dev.D (2008)	Udaan (2010)

Dev.D is the soundtrack to the 2009 film of the same name directed by Anurag Kashyap. A modern-day adaptation of Sarat Chandra Chattopadhyay's Bengali novel Devdas, the film stars Abhay Deol, Mahie Gill and Kalki Koechlin as the principal characters, Dev, Paro and Chandramukhi, based on the novel. The album featured 18 tracks composed by Amit Trivedi with lyrics for the songs written by Amitabh Bhattacharya, Shellee, Anusha Mani, and Shruti Pathak, and consisted of a variety of genres.

The soundtrack was released by T-Series on 31 December 2008, coinciding New Year's Eve in digital platforms, followed by a CD release on 7 January 2009. It received positive response for the compositions, blending of various genres, lyrics, instrumentations and several aspects, and has been called as one of the best Hindi film albums ever due to its experimental approach. With the success of the album, Trivedi established prominence in the Hindi film music scene becoming one of the leading composers, and won National Film Award for Best Music Direction in 2010.

== Development ==
Dev.D was Trivedi's first project he signed. However, as the film experienced production delays and shelving, Kashyap recommended Trivedi's name to Aamir (2008), another film produced by UTV Spotboy, which marked his debut film, and Dev.D being the second to be released. The music blends several genres ranging from folk, rock, street band, metal and world music, to different cultures which consisted of Rajasthani, Punjabi, Awadhi and Europop. Dev's character consisted of psychedelic rock and hard rock music, whereas Paro's character featured several Punjabi and Awadhi songs, and Chanda's character mostly consisted of Western classical music. Dev.D does not feature lip sync songs and would be played in background as montages.

The popular track "Emosanal Attyachar" was composed in a specific way pertaining to his vision of a brass wedding band style. While composing the song, Trivedi thought that he and Bhattacharya would sing the song themselves and present the version to Kashyap. Then, they planned to bring on qawwali singers to record the track. But Kashyap liked their scratch recording of the track. Bhattacharya felt upset as he was not singing in the normal voice, but in a caricatured way with the song being tweaked a little bit. He was also concerned about his ambitions of becoming a singer and with this debut, they would not get work in the music industry. Hence they credited the song under the pseudonym bandmaster Rangeela and Rasila from Himachal Pradesh. This was revealed by Trivedi nearly a decade. He was also being critical of the song as he felt that it won't work and would be remembered for 6–7 days, but contrarily, it emerged as the biggest chartbuster and breakthrough hit for Trivedi.

== Track listing ==
No.	Title	Lyrics	Singer(s)	Length
1.	"Emosanal Attyachar" (Brass Band Version)	Amitabh Bhattacharya	Band Master Rangeela and Rasila	4:00
2.	"Duniya"	Amitabh Bhattacharya	Amit Trivedi	3:52
3.	"Nayan Tarse"	Amitabh Bhattacharya	Amit Trivedi	3:09
4.	"Pardesi"	Shellee	Tochi Raina	4:00
5.	"Saali Khushi"	Amitabh Bhattacharya	Amit Trivedi	3:13
6.	"Paayaliya"	Shruti Pathak	Shruti Pathak	5:52
7.	"Mahi Mennu"	Shellee	Labh Janjua	2:54
8.	"Aankh Micholi"	Amitabh Bhattacharya	Amit Trivedi	4:00
9.	"Yahin Meri Zindagi"	Amitabh Bhattacharya	Aditi Singh Sharma	3:43
10.	"Dhol Yaara Dhol"	Shellee	Shilpa Rao and Kshitij Tarey	4:10
11.	"Ek Hulchul Si"	Amitabh Bhattacharya	Joi Barua	4:29
12.	"Hikknaal"	Shellee	Labh Janjua	3:47
13.	"Dil Mein Jaagi"	Anusha Mani	Anusha Mani	3:01
14.	"Emotional Attyachar" (Rock Version)	Amitabh Bhattacharya	Bonnie Chakraborty	4:01
15.	"Ranjhana"	Shellee	Shilpa Rao and Kshitij Tarey	1:47
16.	"Mahi Mennu" (Sad Version)	Shellee	Labh Janjua	1:21
17.	"Dev-Chanda" (Theme 1)	—	Neuman Pinto and Bianca Gomes	2:23
18.	"Dev-Chanda" (Theme 2)	—	Instrumental	1:47
Total length:				1:01:31

== Reception ==
The soundtrack was met with positive response. Joginder Tuteja of Bollywood Hungama gave four stars and wrote "Amit Trivedi gives an excellent start to the year by presenting to audience the music of Dev D, which brings in so much variety to proceedings that one just feels truly content. These are the kind of songs that should play for bits and piece in the narrative of Dev D and add great value to it [...] Just pick this one quickly from the shelves; they don't make such albums in dozens!" In a five-star review, Rahul Bhatia of Hindustan Times described it as "the most radical mainstream Bollywood album ever". Sumit Bhattacharya of Rediff.com rated three stars saying "pick up this CD — which zigzags through genres and boasts of some deliciously cynical lyrics and treatment — if you're in the mood to experiment. But be warned, there's no saccharine sweetness." Karthik Srinivasan of Bangalore Mirror reviewed the album saying "Such abundance of songs in a soundtrack may end up in a Saawariya’esque tedium; or they can combine to make a brilliantly thematic compilation, like in Dev.D". He later re-reviewed the album in Milliblog praising Trivedi as "the new A. R. Rahman".

Revisiting the music album post-decade, Devarsi Ghosh of Scroll.in wrote "At a time when Hindi film music is stuck in a bottomless pit, it is safe to say that Dev.D had one of the last great soundtracks. Almost nothing that has come after can measure up to its controlled madness. The Dev.D album is the successor of A. R. Rahman’s clutter-breaking work in Roja (1992) and Thiruda Thiruda (1993)." Utkarsh Shrivatsava of Firstpost wrote "Throwing in Rajasthani-rock with a sorrowful ballad along with some smooth lounge fusion, Trivedi worked his magic to produce a revolutionary album, one which would (and does) stand alone as a piece of art."

Standup comedian, lyricist, writer and director Varun Grover, in his column for India Today, included Dev.D while listing ten evergreen albums from Hindi film music. Grover described it as a "soundtrack that careens playfully from Dixieland to edgier tones". The soundtrack topped the "Top 20 Bollywood Soundtracks since 2000" listed by Tatsam Mukherjee in his column for HuffPost, calling it as "the finest album in Bollywood since 20 years". Vipin Nair ranked the album at number 21 on "100 Greatest Bollywood Soundtracks" in his column for Film Companion.

== Accolades ==
Award	Date of ceremony	Category	Recipient(s) and nominee(s)	Result	Ref.
Apsara Film & Television Producers Guild Awards (Note: Also known as Star Guild Awards.)	8 January 2010	Best Lyricist	Amitabh Bhattacharya and Shellee (for the song "Emosanal Attyachar")	Nominated	
Filmfare Awards	22 February 2010	Best Music Director	Amit Trivedi	Nominated	
Filmfare Awards	22 February 2010	Best Background Score	Amit Trivedi	Won	
Filmfare Awards	22 February 2010	R. D. Burman Award for New Music Talent	Amit Trivedi	Won	
International Indian Film Academy Awards	5 June 2010	Best Music Director	Amit Trivedi	Nominated	
International Indian Film Academy Awards	5 June 2010	Best Lyricist	Amitabh Bhattacharya	Nominated	
Mirchi Music Awards	10 February 2010	Upcoming Lyricist of The Year	Amitabh Bhattacharya (for the song "Emosanal Attyachar")	Won	
Mirchi Music Awards	10 February 2010	Upcoming Female Vocalist of The Year	Aditi Singh Sharma (for the song "Yahi Meri Zindagi")	Won	
National Film Awards	22 October 2010	Best Music Direction – Songs	Amit Trivedi	Won	
Screen Awards	9 January 2010	Best Lyricist	Amitabh Bhattacharya	Nominated	
Screen Awards	9 January 2010	Best Background Music	Amit Trivedi	Won	
Stardust Awards	17 January 2010	Standout Performance By A Music Director	Amit Trivedi	Won	
Stardust Awards	17 January 2010	Standout Performance by a Lyricist	Amitabh Bhattacharya (for the song "Emosanal Attyachar")	Won	
Stardust Awards	17 January 2010	Standout Performance by a Lyricist	Shellee (for the song "Dol Yaara Dol")	Nominated	
Stardust Awards	17 January 2010	New Musical Sensation – Male	Amit Trivedi (for the song "Emosanal Attyachar")	Won	
Stardust Awards	17 January 2010	New Musical Sensation – Male	Tochi Raina (for the song "Pardesi")	Nominated	
