= Sajdaa =

2010 song performed by Rahat Fateh Ali Khan, Shankar Mahadevan, and Richa Sharma

Song by Rahat Fateh Ali Khan, Shankar Mahadevan and Richa Sharma

from the album My Name is Khan
- Language: Hindi
- Released: December 2009
- Recorded: 2009
- Length: 6:05
- Label: Sony Music India
- Composer: Shankar–Ehsaan–Loy
- Lyricist: Niranjan Iyengar

Music video
- "Sajdaa" on YouTube

"Sajdaa" (transl. Worship) is a song from the 2010 Hindi film My Name is Khan, sung by Rahat Fateh Ali Khan, Shankar Mahadevan, and Richa Sharma. The song received positive reception from critics and won one award at the International Indian Film Academy Awards, India's Mirchi Music Awards and that country's Zee Cine Awards.

== Composition and music video ==
The lyrics for the song were written by Niranjan Iyengar and the music was composed by the trio Shankar–Ehsaan–Loy. The song is picturized upon Shah Rukh Khan and Kajol, the lead cast of the film. According to Film Companion, "in Urdu, the word 'sajdaa' means to bow in prayer and in that spirit, the song is an exercise in romantic devotion." The video shows Kajol (Mandira Rathod Khan) getting mehndi applied. It also shows Mandira and Shah Rukh Khan (Rizwan Khan)'s marriage, and their newly married life.

== Reception ==
The Indo-Asian News Service included the song in their listing of 10 greatest Bollywood songs of 2010.

The song was lauded by critics. Joginder Tuteja of Bollywood Hungama describing the song as a "chartbuster track" said "it is amazing to see Rahat Fateh Ali Khan delivering a chartbuster track practically every second month and this New Year couldn't see a better outing than 'Sajda' which maintains an Indian quality to it throughout it's [sic] duration." Sukanya Verma of Rediff.com also liked the song and said, "A sense of breezy passion and poetic adulation run freely in the romance and reverence of the celebratory 'Sajda'."

"Sajdaa" won three awards. At the 12th ceremony of India's IIFA Awards, it won the Best Lyricist award for Iyengar. The song also won at the 3rd ceremony of India's Mirchi Music Awards—Best song in Sufi Tradition. It won an award at the 2011 ceremony of India's Zee Cine Awards—Best Playback Singer – Female for Richa Sharma.
