= London Dreams (soundtrack) =

Film soundtrack album

Soundtrack album by Shankar–Ehsaan–Loy
- Released: 16 September 2009
- Recorded: 2009
- Genre: Feature film soundtrack Rock
- Length: 54:43
- Label: T-Series

Shankar–Ehsaan–Loy chronology
Sikandar (2009)	London Dreams (2009)	Wake Up Sid (2009)

London Dreams is the soundtrack to the 2009 Bollywood film with the same name directed by Vipul Amrutlal Shah starring Salman Khan, Ajay Devgan and Asin. The music is composed by Shankar–Ehsaan–Loy, while the lyrics are penned by Prasoon Joshi.

The album was released on 16 September 2009 by T-Series.

The song style is generally rock inspired to match the motifs in the movie. "Khanabadosh", "Shola Shola", "Barso Yaaron", "Khwab" and "Man Ko Ati Bhavey Saiyaan" were very popular songs; "Man Ko Ati Bhavey" and "Khanabadosh" being the most popular ones.

== Development ==
Initially, A.R. Rahman was approached for composing the music for the film, but he opted out due to other commitments. Vipul then roped in the critically acclaimed trio Shankar–Ehsaan–Loy, who scored music for Rock On!!, the first rock musical in Bollywood.

The soundtrack consists of eight original songs and three remix versions. "Barso Yaaron" by Vishal and Roop Kumar Rathod is a rock number that ends with "Hanuman Chalisa". "Manko Ati Bhavey Saiyaan" is a romantic song picturized on Asin and Salman at the Eiffel Tower. Then follows the folksy "Tapkey Masti" by Feroz Khan and bhangra beat number with aesthetics of qawaali - "Yaari Bina" by Roop Kumar Rathod. "Khanabadosh" is crooned by Mohan, accompanied with rich and layered instrumentations. Abhijeet Ghoshal's "Jashn Hai Jeet Ka", a soft mellow song is then followed by Rahat-Shankar duo's "Khwab Jo". Finally, there is Zubin Garg's "Shola Shola", rock track with a techno twist to it.

All the songs in the soundtrack are rendered by male singers, which is a rarity in Bollywood.

== Track listing ==
All lyrics are written by Prasoon Joshi; all music is composed by Shankar–Ehsaan–Loy.

No.	Title	Artist(s)	Length
1.	"Barso Yaaron"	Vishal Dadlani, Roop Kumar Rathod	05:48
2.	"Man Ko Ati Bhavey Saiyaan"	Shankar Mahadevan	05:14
3.	"Tapkey Masti"	Feroz Khan	04:29
4.	"Khanabadosh"	K.Mohan	04:41
5.	"Khwab"	Rahat Fateh Ali Khan, Shankar Mahadevan	06:15
6.	"Yaari Bina"	Roop Kumar Rathod, Milind Diwadkar	04:32
7.	"Jashn Hai Jeet Ka"	Abhijeet Ghoshal	04:11
8.	"Shola Shola"	Zubeen Garg	05:31
9.	"Khanabadosh" (Remix)	K.Mohan	05:00
10.	"Man Ko Ati Bhavey" (Remix)	Shankar Mahadevan	05:30
11.	"Tapke Masti" (Remix)	Feroz Khan	04:20
Total length:			54:43

== Reception ==
Professional ratings
Review scores
Source	Rating
Bollywood Hungama	3/5 stars
Rediff.com	3.5/5 stars
PlanetBollywood.com	8/10 stars
GlamSham	3.5/5 stars

The music was met with positive critical response upon release. Joginder Tuteja of Bollywood Hungama said, "Once you are into the album the fifth time over, you realize that London Dreams does carry some good stuff to make heads turn. The songs are bound to find much better acceptance if the film succeeds at the box office."

GlamSham, in its review, remarked, "London Dreams sizzles out with rock-music genre of soundtracks and accompanies all other varied genres ('bhangra', 'qawalli') in its packaging with promising results. Overall, it's a satisfying listening experience from trio and 'must-grab' musical package for all rock music lovers."

Chandrima Pal of Rediff, in her three and a half star review, described the album as, "tight, meticulously planned and power-packed, with hardly any weak link" and called it "one of the most engaging albums to have emerged this season."

PlanetBollywood.com's review was along the similar lines too, which read, "London Dreams deserves high praise for its lyrics and vocals, where the music also becomes experimental in nature in the case of this particular album where the trio really go wild with their music. A must-buy for SEL and Prasoon Joshi enthusiasts and music lovers alike, as this album has come to impress all the way."

Vibhuti Patel of BBC UK gave the album a thumbs up, calling the album "a class above the usual bollywood fare."

== Controversy ==
The song "Barso Yaaron" ran into controversy as the song had a part where Salman Khan chants the Hanuman Chalisa in a rock concert. The censor board felt this might hurt some religious sentiments and asked director Vipul Shah to change the visuals. So Vipul went to Delhi and approached the tribunal, which accepted his point of view and passed the promos.

Composer Ehsaan Noorani of the trio, later commented, "First there was a bit of worry because you know how in this country everything is sensitive. When it came through, it is a very innocent depiction of Hanuman Chalisa. It is very valid. Whenever we start our concert, we start with a Ganesh shloka."
