= Lootera =

2013 Indian film by Vikramaditya Motwane

- Theatrical release poster
- Directed by: Vikramaditya Motwane
- Written by: Screenplay: Bhavani Iyer; Dialogues: Anurag Kashyap
- Story by: Vikramaditya Motwane
- Based on: The Last Leaf by O. Henry
- Produced by: Anurag Kashyap; Ekta Kapoor; Shobha Kapoor; Vikas Bahl
- Starring: Sonakshi Sinha; Ranveer Singh
- Cinematography: Mahendra J. Shetty
- Edited by: Dipika Kalra
- Music by: Amit Trivedi
- Production companies: Balaji Motion Pictures; Phantom Films
- Distributed by: Eros International
- Release date: 5 July 2013
- Running time: 135 minutes
- Country: India
- Language: Hindi
- Budget: est. ₹320 million
- Box office: est. ₹461.4 million

Lootera (/lʊˈtɛrə/, Hindi: [lʊˈʈeːɾɑː]; transl. Robber) is a 2013 Indian Hindi-language period romantic drama film directed by Vikramaditya Motwane and the second half is based on author O. Henry's 1907 short story "The Last Leaf". It is the second film directed by Motwane after the critically acclaimed Udaan (2010).

Set in the 1950s against the backdrop of the Zamindari Abolition Act by the newly independent India, it tells the story of a young conman posing as an archaeologist and the daughter of a Bengali zamindar. The film stars Sonakshi Sinha and Ranveer Singh in lead roles. Produced by Shobha Kapoor, Ekta Kapoor, Anurag Kashyap and Vikas Bahl, the film features music and background score by Amit Trivedi with lyrics penned by Amitabh Bhattacharya and cinematography by Mahendra J. Shetty.

Lootera received positive reviews upon release, with particular praise directed towards Sinha and Singh's performance, thus proving to be a breakthrough for the latter. Many consider the film a commercial flop, but in a later interview, Motwane said that "nobody lost money on that film. It’s just that the fact that being Ranveer Singh’s next film or Sonakshi Sinha’s next film, there were expectations of a Rs 30 crore weekend, but it didn’t happen."

At the 59th Filmfare Awards, Lootera received 4 nominations, including Best Actress (Sinha), and won Best Female Playback Singer (Monali Thakur for "Sawaar Loon").

== Plot ==
In the picturesque town of Manikpur, West Bengal, in 1953, a landlord named Soumitra Roy Chaudhary goes to watch a jatra with his daughter, Soudhamini Pakhi Roy Choudhary, an aspiring writer. After Pakhi suffers an asthma attack from the ensuing excitement, she is rushed to her room and given medication. As she recuperates, her father comforts her and narrates the story of the invincible king of the Bhil tribe whose soul resided inside a parrot, telling her that she is the parrot within whom his life resides. One day, after threatening the family driver into letting her drive the family car, Pakhi accidentally bumps into a motorbike on the road, mildly injuring the young man on the motorbike. A few days later, the same man shows up at their mansion, introducing himself to the landlord as Varun Srivastava, an archaeologist who wants to study the land surrounding the temple that the landlord owns. Over the next few weeks, Varun charms the landlord and his daughter with his knowledge and persona and is invited, along with his assistant and friend, Devdas Mukherjee, also known as Dev, to live at their expansive mansion.

Soon, love brews between Varun and Pakhi as they bond over art and literature. Pakhi confesses her aspirations of becoming an author, while Varun reveals his desire to paint a masterpiece. Their love soon culminates in a passionate affair. Meanwhile, an act passed by the Indian government debars the power of landlords, causing tension in the Roy Choudhary household. The ancient artifacts the family owns must be sold, and Varun helps arrange the purchases. As Varun's stay comes to an end, he asks Roy Choudhury for his daughter's hand in marriage, and preparations for their marriage begin. Before the marriage, Varun's uncle, A. K. Bajpai, who raised him, arrives and discourages Varun from marriage, stating that Varun will only give Pakhi grief because of the danger of what he actually does for a living, and that people like them are not meant to fall in love and have normal lives. Varun is conflicted but agrees and makes his choice. He and Dev escape that very night, along with all the valuables they stole from the landlord. On the marriage day, Varun is nowhere to be found, and everyone shockingly discovers that the idols from the temple have been stolen and the currency notes from the purchase that Varun arranged of the family's artifacts are all counterfeit.

In the second half of the film, the story moves to one year after the incident at the wedding. A sick Pakhi now lives in Dalhousie with her maid, Shyama as her only company. Her father has died, unable to bear the shock of betrayal by Varun, and she still has not recovered from her heartbreak. When Inspector K. N. Singh requests her to help him capture Varun, Pakhi refuses to do so, wanting only to forget him. Soon after, Varun and Dev show up at Dalhousie for their next heist and stay at a lodge on Pakhi's property. Shortly, things take a drastic turn when the police manage to find out their whereabouts and a pursuit ensues. Varun inadvertently shoots Dev and a constable fatally and is injured in the encounter. He removes the bullet and then goes to seek refuge in Pakhi's house. Pakhi and Shyama attempt to hand him over to the police, but he threatens them. Pakhi gives in, but she is nevertheless enraged and repels Varun's comforting advances and explanation. In a letter, she explains to him that she is dying of tuberculosis and will die the day the last leaf falls from the wilting tree outside the window. Meanwhile, Shyama leaves the house, promising Varun that he would not be reported to the police.

Varun plans his escape, but when his accomplice comes, he refuses to go and instead stays behind to take care of the sick Pakhi. He confesses to her that his real name is Atmanand Tripathi, and that he has regretted abandoning her since the day he escaped. Soon, Pakhi warms up to him, and her faith remains intact when each day she finds one last leaf remaining on the tree. In the end, seeing Pakhi's condition improving, Varun decides that it is time for him to leave, and he takes off, only to come face to face with a police blockade on the road, who proceed to shoot him fatally in encounter killing. Meanwhile, Pakhi wakes up to find that Varun has disappeared, but the tree still has a leaf on it. She becomes suspicious and discovers that the leaf has been affixed to the tree by Varun. Every night, he would tie it on a branch of the tree so that she would not give up hope to live and it was Varun's masterpiece. Pakhi realises the truth after she looks at the leaf closely and sees that it has been painted upon, and she smiles with tears in her eyes knowing she will live.

== Cast ==
- Sonakshi Sinha as Soudhamini Pakhi Roy Chaudhary
- Ranveer Singh as Varun "Vijay" Shrivastav a.k.a Atmanand "Nandu" Tripathi
- Barun Chanda as Zamindar Soumitra Roy Chaudhary
- Vikrant Massey as Devdas "Dev" Mukherjee
- Arif Zakaria as A. K. Bajpai
- Adil Hussain as Inspector Krishna Niranjan "K. N." Singh
- Divya Dutta as Shyama
- Shirin Guha as Devyani

== Production ==
=== Development ===
Vikramaditya Motwane wrote the script of Lootera in 2005. Bhavani Iyer had co-written the script with Motwane. Ranveer Singh's character was created by the director whereas Sonakshi plays the role of female character from the book. Actor Ranveer Singh claimed that he was not initially convinced with his character in Lootera and had declined to star in the movie. With script readings he grew confident that he could play the role of a con man in the movie, and rehearsed extensively. In an interview with The Hindu, Sonakshi Sinha stated, "I play a Bengali girl. It's an authentic Bengali look of the fifties that I am sporting and they (the director and designer Subarna) have taken a lot of trouble to go through the kind of clothes, jewellery, hair and make-up done in that era. We have tried to replicate it. Vikramaditya has kept the make-up simple with only the kajal, kumkum, and some laali on the lips which is what the women used to do then. It was the most difficult shooting experience for me so far. In terms of my character, my look, my performance and the locations, everything had to be from an era I knew nothing about." The director insisted Ranveer's look be an amalgamation of James Dean and Dev Anand.

=== Filming ===
In November 2011, the filmmakers confirmed Sonakshi Sinha and Ranveer Singh for the lead roles. By December 2011, both the actors attended workshops for the look of the character, body language, speech as the film was set in Bengal in the era of the 1950s. Subarna Ray Chaudhari undertook extensive research to design the costumes for the characters to fit the required look. A romantic song was shot in December 2011. The first schedule was completed in Mumbai by end of December 2011. In January 2012, the set of the film erected in Dalhousie, where the actors were to shoot over for few days was destroyed due to bad weather that caused heavy losses amounting to 5 million. The weather forced the crew to trek through knee-high snow. However, certain scenes were canned at Kalatop, close to Dalhousie. The schedule was postponed to March 2012. The next schedule began in Kolkata from 23 January 2012 and continued in rural parts of West Bengal. Scenes involving Ranveer, Sonakshi and Barun Chanda were shot at the 11th century Jain temple in Deulghata and Belkuri. The area being Maoist affected, with great risk the entire cast and crew shot scenes under heavy police control. In March 2012, the team made its second attempt to shoot in Dalhousie, but actor Ranveer Singh injured his back and hence the schedule was postponed to May 2012. During May 2012, the team made its third attempt to shoot at Dalhousie wherein scenes that were left out to be filmed in the snow were shot by creating a set under artificial snowy conditions in summer season. Certain scenes featuring Shirin Guha and Arif Zakaria separately were wrapped up by March 2012. Along with potential 50 crew members the leading duo shot at the Itachuna Rajbari in Hooghly District. Old house scenes were later filmed in Purulia. The final schedule of the film took place in Mumbai, and was wrapped up in July 2012. The filming was complete by the end of August 2012 and the release date was scheduled to 29 March 2013. The first trailer released in March 2013 later revealed that the film would release on 5 July 2013.

== Music ==
Amit Trivedi composed the film's score and soundtrack in his second collaboration with Motwane after Udaan (2010), and the album featured six tracks with the lyrics penned by Amitabh Bhattacharya. Set in the styles of 1950s Hindi film music, Trivedi adapted his ways of composition to match the tone of the film and recorded a live orchestra for the score. The album was released through iTunes on 29 May 2013, and in physical formats on 7 June 2013 through the T-Series label.

== Marketing ==
The first look and the trailer of the film was released on 15 March 2013. To match with the old world theme of the film, the film launch was held at the Liberty Cinema in Mumbai, which was constructed in 1947. The trailer was well-received and appreciated by critics, especially the featured background score. The second theatrical trailer was released on 10 June 2013. Unlike other films, the lead actress allotted forty days for the pre-marketing of the film.

== Release ==
The film was screened at Yash Raj Studios in Mumbai two days prior to its release date. The release in India was on estimated 1,600 screens, emphasizing more multiplex releases rather than single screens.

=== Critical reception ===
India

Critic Taran Adarsh of Bollywood Hungama gave the film 4 on a scale of 5 and wrote, "On the whole, Lootera is an intrinsically earnest and profoundly heartwarming story that stays in your heart. An absolute must for those who love romantic films or are romantic at heart. This one's a cinematic gem!". Raja Sen of Rediff rated 5/5 stars and noted, "Lootera is a gorgeous, gorgeous film, one that uses its period setting affectionately, with loving detail, and not exploitatively, as our cinema is wont to do." Meena Iyer of The Times of India assigned the film 4 out of 5 and noted, "Lootera is a love saga of yore." She added, "You may find this film boring if state-of-the-art, slow romance is not your idea of a movie outing." Deccan Herald gave four stars and stated, "Lootera is a flawed gem filled with moments of glorious emotions. The storytelling shows the hands of a masterly visionary who tends to dither in moments of deep drama. But then there is Sonakshi Sinha, who makes you forget all the blemishes in this unforgettable tragedy." Manohar Basu of Koimoi gave it 4/5 stars, commenting that "Lootera is one film that will overwhelm you. Vikramaditya Motwane has given a seraphic piece that glorifies cinema itself. The narrative is framed on a devastative tapestry and the film's climax knots up calamitously that will keep one absorbed." Saibal Chatterjee of NDTV gave it 4/5 and wrote, "An epic canvas, a quiet love story, a cops-and-robbers drama and an impressively sophisticated storytelling style: Lootera has all this and much more. In short, Lootera is a Bollywood miracle – a rare Mumbai film that is mounted on a lavish scale and yet dares not to play by the established norms of the marketplace." Critic Mayank Shekhar wrote, "God is in the detail, so is a good film–this is director Vikramaditya Motwane's second." Deepanjana Pal for Firstpost noted, "Lootera fumbles as a love story and without this pivot, Pakhi and Varun's story wobbles awkwardly. For instance, you have to wonder how loving a relationship is when a woman learns the man she loves has been shot, but doesn't ask him anything about his injury."

== Box office ==
=== India ===
Lootera had a bumper opening at multiplexes and collected around ₹310 million (US$3.3 million) on its opening day. The film amassed a total of almost ₹950 million (US$10 million) over its opening weekend. The film's collections were excellent on weekdays and it collected around ₹1.25 billion (US$13 million) in its opening week. Prior to its Japanese release, its final total finished around ₹4.60 billion (US$49 million) nett.

== Accolades ==
Note – The lists are ordered by the date of announcement, not necessarily by the date of ceremony/telecast.

| Distributor | Date announced | Category | Recipient | Result | Reference |
|---|---|---|---|---|---|
| BIG Star Entertainment Awards | December 2013 | Best Actor in a Romantic Role – Female | Sonakshi Sinha | Won | |
| BIG Star Entertainment Awards | December 2013 | Best Actor in a Romantic Role – Male | Ranveer Singh | Nominated | |
| BIG Star Entertainment Awards | December 2013 | Most Entertaining Romantic Film | Vikramaditya Motwane, Anurag Kashyap, Ekta Kapoor, Shobha Kapoor, Vikas Bahl | Nominated | |
| BIG Star Entertainment Awards | December 2013 | Most Entertaining Singer – Female | Monali Thakur for "Sawaar Loon" | Nominated | |
| Zee Cine Awards | 6 February 2014 | Best Actor (Jury's Choice) – Female | Sonakshi Sinha | Won | |
| Zee Cine Awards | 6 February 2014 | Best Playback Singer – Female | Monali Thakur for "Sawaar Loon" | Nominated | |
| Zee Cine Awards | 6 February 2014 | Best Music Director | Amit Trivedi | Nominated | |
| Zee Cine Awards | 6 February 2014 | Best Lyricist | Amitabh Bhattacharya for "Shikayatein" | Nominated | |
| Zee Cine Awards | 6 February 2014 | Best Background Score | Amit Trivedi | Nominated | |
| Zee Cine Awards | 6 February 2014 | Best Production Design | Aditya Kanwar | Nominated | |
| Zee Cine Awards | 6 February 2014 | Best Cinematography | Mahendra Shetty | Nominated | |
| Zee Cine Awards | 6 February 2014 | Best Editing | Dipika Kalra | Nominated | |
| Colors Screen Awards | 8 January 2014 | Best Actor (Popular) – Female | Sonakshi Sinha | Nominated | |
| Colors Screen Awards | 8 January 2014 | Best Actor – Female | Sonakshi Sinha | Nominated | |
| Colors Screen Awards | 8 January 2014 | Best Female Playback Singer | Monali Thakur for "Sawaar Loon" | Nominated | |
| Colors Screen Awards | 8 January 2014 | Best Costume Design | Subarna Ray Chaudhari | Nominated | |
| Filmfare Awards | 14 January 2014 | Best Female Playback Singer | Monali Thakur for "Sawaar Loon" | Won | |
| Filmfare Awards | 14 January 2014 | Best Lyricist | Amitabh Bhattacharya for "Shikayatein" | Nominated | |
| Filmfare Awards | 14 January 2014 | Best Actress | Sonakshi Sinha | Nominated | |
| Filmfare Awards | 14 January 2014 | Best Music Director | Amit Trivedi | Nominated | |
| Filmfare Awards | 14 January 2014 | Best Costume Design | Subarna Ray Chaudhari | Nominated | |
| Filmfare Awards | 14 January 2014 | Best Production Design | Aditya Kanwar | Nominated | |
| Star Guild Awards | 16 February 2014 | Best Actress | Sonakshi Sinha | Nominated | |
| Star Guild Awards | 16 February 2014 | Best Lyricist | Amitabh Bhattacharya for "Shikayatein" | Nominated | |
| Star Guild Awards | 16 February 2014 | Best Female Playback Singer | Monali Thakur for "Sawaar Loon" | Nominated | |
| IIFA Awards | 26 April 2014 | Best Actress – Female | Sonakshi Sinha | Nominated | |
| IIFA Awards | 26 April 2014 | Best Female Playback Singer | Monali Thakur for "Sawaar Loon" | Nominated | |
