= Amit Trivedi =

Indian music composer, singer, and lyricist (born 1979)

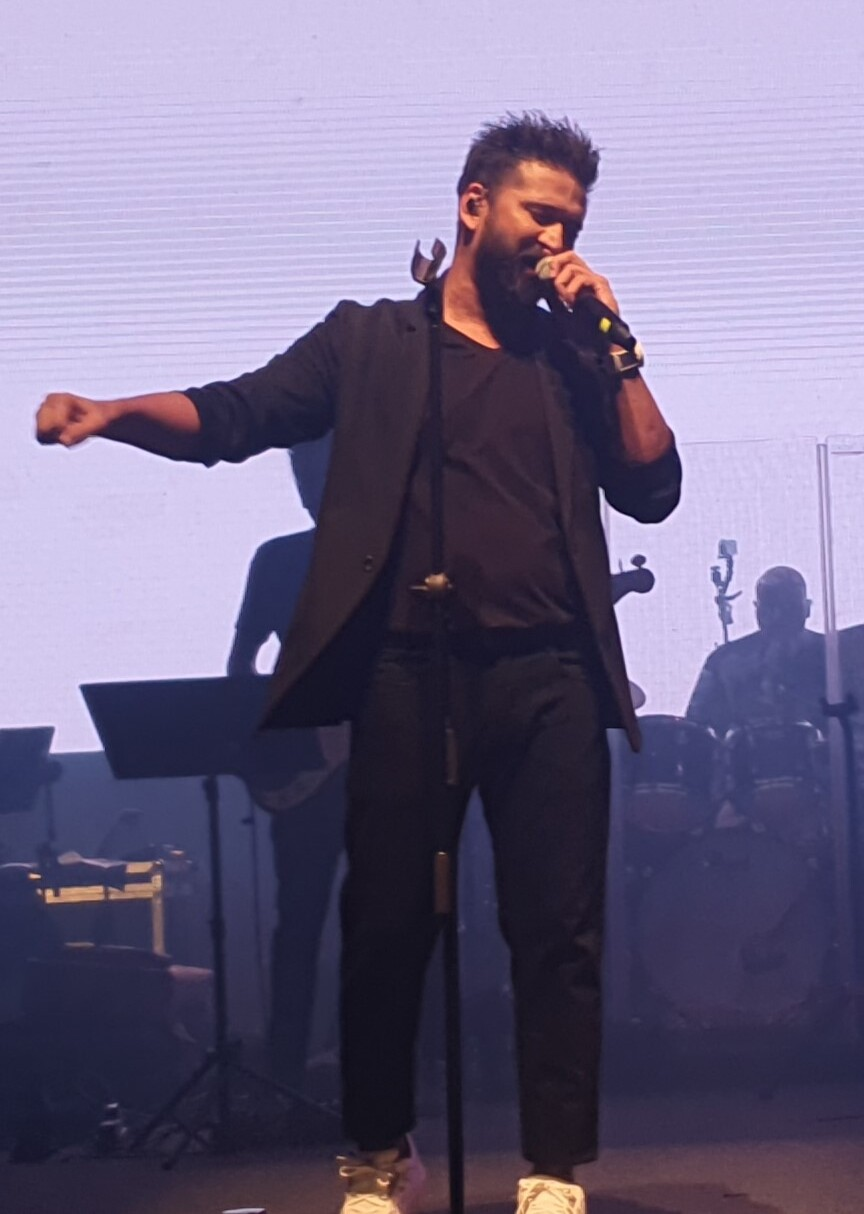
- Trivedi in 2022

Background information
- Born: 8 April 1979 (age 47); Bombay, Maharashtra, India
- Origin: Mumbai, India
- Genre: Indie-pop
- Occupations: Music director; singer; composer; lyricist
- Instruments: Vocals; keyboards; piano
- Years active: 2001–present
- Spouse: Krutee Trivedi

Amit Trivedi (born 8 April 1979) is an Indian composer, singer and lyricist. He began his career composing music for theatre productions, advertising jingles and independent music projects before making his film debut with the Hindi-language film Aamir (2008).

== Early life ==
Amit Trivedi was born in Bandra, Mumbai. His family originated from Ahmedabad, Gujarat. During his school years, he developed an interest in electronic musical instruments.

== Career ==
While in college, Trivedi started a band known as "Om the Fusion Band" alongside Amartya Bobo Rahut, Shriram Iyer, and fellow members Ram and Vish. The group performed at local gigs and small shows, eventually releasing an album through Times Music. Trivedi also pursued independent projects, composing for theatre (Hindi and Gujarati plays), background music for television shows, programming for Marathi films, live performances and dandiya shows. He also composed advertising jingles for brands such as McDonald's and Airtel.

Upon Kashyap's recommendation, Trivedi was brought in for Raj Kumar Gupta's directorial venture Aamir. Trivedi and Gupta worked on aligning the soundtrack with the film narrative, which garnered positive critical attention.

He worked on the soundtrack of Dev.D (2009), which he later described as a turning point in his career.

He was awarded both the Filmfare R. D. Burman Award for New Music Talent and the Best Background Score at the 55th Filmfare Awards, in addition to his first nomination for the Filmfare Award for Best Music Director, before receiving the National Film Award for Best Music Direction. Trivedi wrote the score for Wake Up Sid (2009), and one of his compositions, "Iktara", was also included in the soundtrack.

In 2009, Anshu Sharma offered Trivedi the opportunity to compose the team anthem "Game for More" for Royal Challengers Bangalore, a team owned by liquor baron Vijay Mallya. Trivedi wrote the title track for the reality show Big Switch aired on UTV Bindaas. He also provided the music and background score Aisha (2010), providing vocals for two songs, "Suno Aisha" and "Sham". He composed the songs and score for Ishaqzaade (2012) and Lootera (2013), which earned him his second and third nominations for the Filmfare Award for Best Music Director, and the soundtrack for Vikas Bahl's highly acclaimed Queen (2014), which earned him his fourth nomination for the Filmfare Award for Best Music Director.

He earned three consecutive nominations for the Filmfare Award for Best Music Director for his diverse compositions in Udta Punjab (2016), Secret Superstar (2017), and Manmarziyaan (2018).

He won Best Song for "Naina Da Kya Kasoor" at the News18 Reel Movie Awards from Andhadhun (2018). He also sang "Laila Laila" for the film. In 2019, Power Brands honored him with the Best7 Music Director of the Year award for Andhadhun at the Bollywood Film Journalists Awards (BFJA).

Trivedi again earned two consecutive nominations for the Filmfare Award for Best Music Director for his compositions in Haseen Dillruba (2021) and Uunchai (2022).

Trivedi composed the official anthem of the 2021 ICC Men's T20 World Cup, with lyrics by Kausar Munir and vocals by Sharvi Yadav and Anand Bhaskar.

He has made TV appearances for various shows on MTV. Additionally, he composed the title track for the television show Aaj Ki Raat Hai Zindagi, hosted by Amitabh Bachchan. He also composed music for the 2018 film Kedarnath, produced by RSVP Movies and Guy in The Sky Pictures.

Trivedi has continued to work on independent music releases under his label "AT Azaad".

== Discography ==
=== As composer ===
Year	Film	Language	Notes	Ref.
2008	Anthiponvettam	Malayalam	One song Malayalam Debut	
2008	Aamir	Hindi	Six songs and Background Score	
2009	Dev.D	Hindi	All songs and Background Score	
2009	Wake Up Sid	Hindi	"Iktara" (3 versions); Background Score	
2010	Striker	Hindi	One song	
2010	Admissions Open	Hindi		
2010	Udaan	Hindi	All Songs and Background Score	
2010	Aisha	Hindi	All Songs and Background Score	
2011	I Am	Hindi	Five songs	
2011	No One Killed Jessica	Hindi	All Songs and Background Score	
2011	Chillar Party	Hindi	All Songs and Background Score	
2011	Trishna	Hindi	One of the composers	
2012	Ishaqzaade	Hindi	All Songs; Background Scores for English Vinglish, Aiyyaa and Luv Shuv Tey Chicken Khurana	
2012	Ek Main Aur Ekk Tu	Hindi	All Songs; Background Scores for English Vinglish, Aiyyaa and Luv Shuv Tey Chicken Khurana	
2012	English Vinglish	Hindi	All Songs; Background Scores for English Vinglish, Aiyyaa and Luv Shuv Tey Chicken Khurana	
2012	Aiyyaa	Hindi	All Songs; Background Scores for English Vinglish, Aiyyaa and Luv Shuv Tey Chicken Khurana	
2012	Luv Shuv Tey Chicken Khurana	Hindi	All Songs; Background Scores for English Vinglish, Aiyyaa and Luv Shuv Tey Chicken Khurana	
2012	Pehla Sitara	Hindi		
2013	Kai Po Che!	Hindi	All Songs; Background Score for Ghanchakkar, Lootera, Queen and Bombay Velvet	
2013	Bombay Talkies	Hindi	All Songs; Background Score for Ghanchakkar, Lootera, Queen and Bombay Velvet	
2013	Ghanchakkar	Hindi	All Songs; Background Score for Ghanchakkar, Lootera, Queen and Bombay Velvet	
2013	Lootera	Hindi	All Songs; Background Score for Ghanchakkar, Lootera, Queen and Bombay Velvet	
2014	Queen	Hindi	All Songs; Background Score for Ghanchakkar, Lootera, Queen and Bombay Velvet	
2015	Bombay Velvet	Hindi	All Songs; Background Score for Ghanchakkar, Lootera, Queen and Bombay Velvet	
2015	Guddu Rangeela		All Songs; Background Score for Ghanchakkar, Lootera, Queen and Bombay Velvet	
2015	Cute & Dangerous	Turkish	Turkish debut as a guest composer	
2015	Highway	Marathi	Marathi debut	
2015	Shaandaar	Hindi	All Songs; Background Score for Shaandaar, Dear Zindagi, Secret Superstar and Pad Man	
2016	Fitoor	Hindi	All Songs; Background Score for Shaandaar, Dear Zindagi, Secret Superstar and Pad Man	
2016	Udta Punjab	Hindi	All Songs; Background Score for Shaandaar, Dear Zindagi, Secret Superstar and Pad Man	
2016	Dear Zindagi	Hindi	All Songs; Background Score for Shaandaar, Dear Zindagi, Secret Superstar and Pad Man	
2017	Qaidi Band	Hindi	All Songs; Background Score for Shaandaar, Dear Zindagi, Secret Superstar and Pad Man	
2017	Secret Superstar	Hindi	All Songs; Background Score for Shaandaar, Dear Zindagi, Secret Superstar and Pad Man	
2017	Rukh	Hindi	All Songs; Background Score for Shaandaar, Dear Zindagi, Secret Superstar and Pad Man	
2018	Pad Man	Hindi	All Songs; Background Score for Shaandaar, Dear Zindagi, Secret Superstar and Pad Man	
2018	Raid	Hindi	Two Songs and Background Score	
2018	Blackmail	Hindi	Four songs	
2018	The Extraordinary Journey of the Fakir	Hindi	Three songs	
2018	Bhavesh Joshi Superhero	Hindi	All Songs and Background Score	
2018	Fanney Khan	Hindi	Five songs	
2018	Manmarziyaan	Hindi	All Songs and Background Score	
2018	Andhadhun	Hindi	Nine songs	
2018	Helicopter Eela	Hindi	Three songs	
2018	Kedarnath	Hindi	All Songs; Background Score for India's Most Wanted	
2019	India's Most Wanted	Hindi	All Songs; Background Score for India's Most Wanted	
2019	Mission Mangal	Hindi	Two Songs and Background Score	
2019	Sye Raa Narasimha Reddy	Telugu	All songs Telugu debut	
2020	V	Telugu	All songs Telugu film	
2020	Gunjan Saxena: The Kargil Girl	Hindi	All songs Netflix film	
2020	Bulbbul	Hindi	Background Score; Netflix film	
2021	Haseen Dillruba	Hindi	All songs Netflix film	
2021	Rashmi Rocket	Hindi	All songs ZEE5 film	
2022	Badhaai Do	Hindi	Eight songs	
2022	Shabaash Mithu	Hindi	All songs	
2022	Chup: Revenge of The Artist	Hindi	Two songs	
2022	Goodbye	Hindi	All Songs and Background Score	
2022	Doctor G	Hindi	Five songs	
2022	Rocket Gang	Hindi	All songs	
2022	Uunchai	Hindi	All songs	
2022	Thai Massage	Hindi	One song	
2022	Qala	Hindi	Five songs Netflix film	
2023	Almost Pyaar with DJ Mohabbat	Hindi	All Songs; Background Score for Almost Pyaar with DJ Mohabbat and Ghoomer	
2023	Mrs. Chatterjee vs Norway	Hindi	All Songs; Background Score for Almost Pyaar with DJ Mohabbat and Ghoomer	
2023	Ghoomer	Hindi	All Songs; Background Score for Almost Pyaar with DJ Mohabbat and Ghoomer	
2023	Ganapath	Hindi	One song	
2023	Jubilee	Hindi	All songs Amazon Prime Video web series	
2024	Shaitaan	Hindi	All Songs; Background Score for Shaitaan	
2024	Tera Kya Hoga Lovely	Hindi	All Songs; Background Score for Shaitaan	
2024	CTRL	Hindi	One song Netflix film	
2025	Azaad	Hindi	All songs	
2025	Raid 2	Hindi	Background Score Only	
2025	Kaalidhar Laapata	Hindi	All songs	
2025	Aabeer Gulaal	Hindi	All songs	
2025	Homebound	Hindi	All songs	
2025	Bad Girl	Tamil	Tamil debut All songs	
2026	Governor	Hindi		
2026	Bhai Tera Star Hai	Hindi	Three songs	
2026	Vibe	Hindi	Four songs	
2026	Daayra	Hindi		
2026	The Vvaan: Force of the Forrest	Hindi	One song	

=== As a playback singer ===
List of Amit Trivedi playback singer credits
Year	Title (Movie/Album/TV shows)	Song(s)	Language	Composer	Notes
2008	Aamir	"Ha Raham (Mehfuz)"; "Chakkar Ghumyo"; "Haara"	Hindi	Himself	
2009	Dev D	"Emosanal Atyachar (Brass Band Version)"; "Duniya"; "Nayan Tarse"; "Saali Khushi"; "Aankh Micholi"	Hindi	Himself	
2010	Udaan	"Geet Mein Dhalte Lafzon Mein"; "Udaan"; "Motumaster"; "Aazaadiyan"	Hindi	Himself	
2010	Aisha	"Suno Aisha"; "Shaam"	Hindi	Himself	
2011	Chillar Party	"Aa Rela Hai Apun"; "Tai Tai Phish"; "Ziddi Piddi"	Hindi	Himself	
2012	Ek Main Aur Ekk Tu	"Gubbare"	Hindi	Himself	
2012	Gangs of Wasseypur – Part 1	"Keh ke lunga"	Hindi	Sneha Khanwalkar	
2012	English Vinglish	"Dhak Dhuk"; "English Vinglish"	Hindi	Himself	
2012	Aiyyaa	"Wakda"	Hindi	Himself	
2012	Luv Shuv Tey Chicken Khurana	"Kikli Kalerdi"; "Motorwada"; "Farukha Baadi"; "Kikli Kalerdi (Punjabi version)"	Hindi	Himself	
2013	Kai Po Che!	"Manjha"; "Meethi Boliyaan"	Hindi	Himself	
2013	Bombay Talkies	"Murabba (Duet)"	Hindi	Himself	
2013	Ghanchakkar	"Allah Meherbaan"; "Ghanchakkar Babu"; "Ghanchakkar Babu (Remix)"	Hindi	Himself	
2013	Lootera	"Zinda"; "Manmarziyan"	Hindi	Himself	
2014	Queen	"Badra Bahaar"; "Jugni"	Hindi	Himself	
2015	Hunterrr	"Bachpan"	Hindi	Khamosh Shah	
2015	Guddu Rangeela	"Guddu Rangeela (Title Track)"; "Sahebaan"	Hindi	Himself	
2015	Shaandaar	"Shaam Shaandaar"; "Senti Wali Mental"	Hindi	Himself	
2015	Bhale Manchi Roju	"Dol Dolre"	Telugu	Sunny M. R.	
2016	Fitoor	"Pashmina"; "Rangaa Re (Hindi version)"; "Ranga Re (English)"	Hindi	Himself	
2016	Dear Zindagi	"Love You Zindagi"; "Just Go To Hell Dil"	Hindi	Himself	
2016	Udta Punjab	"Ud-Daa Punjab"; "Vadiya"	Hindi	Himself	
2017	Qaidi Band	"I am India (Escape)"	Hindi	Himself	
2017	Newton	"Chal Tu Apna Kaam Kar"	Hindi	Rachita Arora	
2018	Pad Man	"Hu Ba Hu"	Hindi	Himself	
2018	Blackmail	"Bewafa Beauty"; "Badla"; "Nindaraan Diyaan"; "Sataasa"	Hindi	Himself	
2018	Bhavesh Joshi Superhero	"Tafreeh"	Hindi	Himself	
2018	Fanney Khan	"Halka Halka"; "Acche Din"; "Tere Jaisa Tu Hai"; "Fu Bai Fu"	Hindi	Himself	
2018	Andhadhun	"Naina Da Kya Kasoor"; "Laila Laila"	Hindi	Himself	
2018	Kedarnath	"Namo Namo"	Hindi	Himself	
2020	Big Brother	"Kando Kando"	Malayalam	Deepak Dev	
2020	V	"Manasu Maare"; "Vasthunna Vachesthunna"	Telugu	Himself	
2021	Dhamaka	"Khoya paya"	Hindi	Vishal Khurana	
2022	RRR	"Dosti"	Hindi	M. M. Keeravaani	
2022	Badhaai Do	"Atak Gaya – Acoustic"; "Gol Gappa"; "Hum Rang Hai"	Hindi	Himself	
2022	Sakala Gunabhirama	"Psycho Pilla"	Telugu	Anudeep Dev	
2022	Chup: Revenge of the Artist	"Mera Love Main"	Hindi	Himself	
2022	Goodbye	"Jaikal Mahakal"	Hindi	Himself	
2022	Doctor G	"Step Copy"	Hindi	Himself	
2022	Thai Massage	"Do You Wanna Boom Boom"; "Dheere Dheere"	Hindi	Song "Dheere Dheere" composed by Joi Barua	
2023	Ganapath	"Lafda Kar Le"	Hindi	Himself	
2026	Mitrata	"Mitrata Anthem"	Gujarati	Parthiv Shah	
2026	Bhai Tera Star Hai	"Bhai tera star hai -Title trak"	Hindi	Himself	
2026	Vibe	"Raaton Mein Aana"	Hindi	Himself	
2026	Last Man in Tower	"Shehar"	Hindi	Govind Vasantha	

== Awards and nominations ==
=== National Film Awards ===
Year	Nominated work	Category	Result	Ref.
2009	Dev.D	Best Music Director	Won	

=== Filmfare Awards ===
Year	Nominated work	Category	Result	Ref.
2010	Dev.D	RD Burman Award for New Music Talent	Won	
2010	Dev.D	Best Background Score	Won	
2010	Dev.D	Best Music Director	Nominated	
2011	Udaan	Best Background Score	Won	
2011	Aisha	Best Background Score	Nominated	
2013	Ishaqzaade	Best Music Director	Nominated	
2014	Lootera	Best Music Director	Nominated	
2014	"Manja" – Kai Po Che!	Best Playback Singer – Male	Nominated	
2015	Queen	Best Background Score	Won	
2015	Queen	Best Music Director	Nominated	
2017	Udta Punjab	Best Music Director	Nominated	
2018	Secret Superstar	Best Music Director	Nominated	
2019	Manmarziyaan	Best Music Director	Nominated	
2022	Haseen Dillruba	Best Music Director	Nominated	

=== Star Screen Awards ===
Year	Nominated work	Category	Result	Ref.
2018	Manmarziyaan	Best Music Director	Won	
2018	Andhadhun – Naina Da Kya Kasoor	Best Playback Singer (Male)	Nominated	

=== Zee Cine Awards ===
Year	Nominated work	Category	Result	Ref.
2018	Secret Superstar	Best Music Director	Won	

=== Mirchi Music Awards ===
Year	Category	Album	Song	Result	Ref.
2009	Listener's Choice Song of the Year	Wake Up Sid	Iktara	Won	
2012	Album of the Year	Ishaqzaade		Nominated	
2014	Album of the Year	Queen		Nominated	
2014	Best Song Producer (Programming & Arranging)	Queen	"London Thumakada"	Nominated	
2015	Best Song Producer (Programming & Arranging)	Bombay Velvet	"Dhadaam Dhadaam"	Nominated	
2015	Indie Pop Song of the Year		"Teriyaan Tu Jaane"	Nominated	
2016	Music Composer of the Year	Udta Punjab	"Ikk Kudi"	Nominated	
2016	Album of the Year	Udta Punjab		Nominated	
2017	Album of the Year	Secret Superstar		Nominated	
2022	Indie Song of the Year	Songs Of Love	"Lagan Laagi Re" (along with the musical team of the song)	Nominated	
2023	Album of the Year	Qala (along with the musical team of the album)		Pending	
2023	Album of the Year	RRR (Hindi) (along with the musical team of the album)		Pending	
2023	Song of the Year	Qala	"Ghodey Pe Sawar" (along with the musical team of the song)	Pending	
2023	Song of the Year	Qala	"Shauq" (along with the musical team of the song)	Pending	
2023	Music Composer of the Year	Qala	"Ghodey Pe Sawar"	Pending	
2023	Music Composer of the Year	Qala	"Shauq"	Pending	
2023	Listener's Choice – Album of the Year	Qala (along with the whole musical team of the album)		Pending	
2023	Listener's Choice – Album of the Year	RRR (Hindi) (along with the musical team of the album)		Pending	

=== Global Indian Music Academy Awards ===
Year	Nominated work	Category	Result	Ref.
2009	Wake Up Sid – Iktara	Best Film Song	Won	
2011	Udaan	Best Background Score	Nominated	
2014	Lootera – Monta Re	GiMA Award for Nayi Soch	Won	
2014	Lootera	Best Music Director	Nominated	
2015	Queen	Best Music Director	Won	
2015	Queen – London Thumakda	Best Music Arranger and Programmer	Won	
2015	Queen – London Thumakda	Best Film Song	Won	
2015	Queen	Best Background Score	Nominated	

=== Stardust Awards ===
Year	Nominated work	Category	Result	Ref.
2009	Dev.D	Standout Performance by a Music Director	Nominated	
2009	Dev.D	New Musical Sensation – Male	Nominated	
2010	Aisha	Standout Performance by a Music Director	Nominated	
2010	Aisha	New Musical Sensation – Male	Nominated	

=== Giffoni Film Festival ===
Year	Nominated work	Category	Result	Ref.
2010	Udaan	Best Music Score	Won	

=== South Indian International Movie Awards ===
Year	Nominated work	Category	Result	Ref.
2021	V	Best Music Director – Telugu	Nominated	
