= Faryl =

Studio album by Faryl Smith
- Released: 9 March 2009
- Recorded: December 2008 – January 2009
- Genre: Classical crossover
- Label: Universal Classics and Jazz
- Producer: Jon Cohen

Faryl Smith chronology
Faryl (2009)	Wonderland (2009)

Faryl is the debut album by British mezzo-soprano Faryl Smith, released on 9 March 2009 by Universal Classics and Jazz. Smith rose to fame after her appearance on the second series of Britain's Got Talent and signed with Universal after the competition. The album was recorded during December 2008 and January 2009 and features the track "River of Light", a song set to The Blue Danube with new lyrics. Faryl was produced by Jon Cohen, and the backing music was provided by a 60-piece orchestra. As part of the album's promotion, Smith made numerous television and radio appearances and filmed a music video for "River of Light". Around this time, she met with then-Prime Minister Gordon Brown at 10 Downing Street.

After its release, Faryl became the fastest-selling classical solo album in British chart history, selling 20,000 copies in the first four days, and a total of 29,200 copies in the first week, more than any other debut album of a classical singer. Faryl entered the UK Albums Chart at number 6, rising to number 4 the next week, and was the third album by a Britain's Got Talent contestant to reach the top ten in Britain. Smith subsequently embarked on a promotional tour in the US to publicise the album, where it reached number 6 on the classical chart.

Faryl was fairly well received by critics, who praised Smith's performances and Cohen's production. However, criticism was directed at the use of the orchestra and at the song choices. As one of the ten best-selling classical albums in the UK in 2009, Faryl was nominated for a Classical BRIT Award in the album of the year category but lost to Only Men Aloud's Band of Brothers. In 2013, the album was certified gold by the British Phonographic Industry.

== Background ==
Smith rose to fame when she, aged 12, competed in the second series of ITV talent show Britain's Got Talent. During the series, she performed "Ave Maria" and a cover of Sarah McLachlan's "Angel". After her initial performance, she received singing lessons from Yvie Burnett, a move criticised by the press. Although she was at one point the favourite to win, she finished outside the top three in the live final. During the competition, Smith rejected offers of a record deal.

== Recording ==
Faryl was recorded in London during Smith's Christmas holiday during December 2008 and January 2009 and completed on 3 January. It features a 60-piece orchestra, which was recorded at Air Studios, in London. The album includes the song "River of Light". The track is a recording of The Blue Danube, a waltz composed by Johann Strauss II, with new lyrics. Smith talked about "River of Light" to the press, saying that The Blue Danube "now has words put to it. I like it because it's different. Everyone knows the tune and everybody has got high hopes for it." Smith said that her favourite song on the album was her version of the Welsh hymn "Calon Lân". Other songs include Smith's version of "Amazing Grace", a cover of "Annie's Song" by John Denver, and a version of "The Way Old Friends Do", rewritten for Smith by Björn Ulvaeus. Smith spoke about the song, saying "It was about divorce ... They didn't think it was appropriate for me to sing about that, so Björn changed the lyrics so it's about friendship." The album was produced by Jon Cohen, who has previously worked with artists including the Operababes and Vanessa Mae.

Universal had received the first shipment of Faryl, but due to a pressing error, though they looked like Smith's albums, they actually contained the music of The Fall's album Imperial Wax Solvent. The mix-up received attention from the international press, including an article in Canadian magazine Exclaim!.

== Promotion ==
Promotion began in January, with performances by Smith at the Mandarin Oriental Hotel and appearances at the debut of the Oliver! 2009 revival. Smith also took part in a photoshoot for publicity and cover photos. A television advert and music video for "River of Light" were recorded to further publicise the release, and Smith also appeared on the cover of April's Classic FM Magazine. Further promotion in the weeks leading up to the release of Faryl included Smith appearing on Loose Women, The Paul O'Grady Show, BBC Radio 4, BBC Radio 5 Live, and BBC Breakfast. She also appeared at the Children's Champion Awards and met then-Prime Minister Gordon Brown at 10 Downing Street. On the day of the release, there was an album signing in Smith's hometown of Kettering, at the HMV branch. Smith said "I definitely want to be at home for the launch. I want to be surrounded by my friends and family because, obviously, it's a big deal for me."

After the UK release, Dickon Stainer, head of Universal Classics and Jazz, spoke of plans to publicise Faryl in the US, saying "America is going to be key. Because of her history on the talent show there's already a great deal of interest in her. The demand is intense." In April 2009, Smith travelled to Los Angeles to begin her promotion of Faryl in the US, including an appearance on The Ellen DeGeneres Show. Faryl was released in the US on 5 May. Smith said before the release that she did not expect it to sell as well as it did in the UK. She said that "in the US it's a lot harder because I'm not as well-known. In the UK, a lot of people obviously watched 'Britain's Got Talent' and stuff, and that was like fresh in everyone's minds." After the release, she was more optimistic, saying "[w]hen I performed in New York, it reminded me of the HMV signing in Kettering and there was quite a big queue so I think my album was well received." Smith returned from the US in early May. Despite the contrary being said when she performed on the third series of Britain's Got Talent, Smith had no plans for a concert tour in 2009; she was quoted as saying that "I'm too young and don't think I would be able to do a tour on my own". However, she did plan to return to the US during her summer holidays to again promote Faryl. She said that "everyone in America was really nice and they do like classical music, but it is so difficult to make it over there ... They seem to like their own singers, but I will just keep trying my best". However, she instead took a short break from her music career in summer, before returning to the recording studio later in the year for Wonderland, her second album, which was released in November.

== Reception ==
Professional ratings
Review scores
Source	Rating
The Times	3/5 stars
The Observer	3/5 stars
Allmusic	3.5/5 stars

Reviewers were generally impressed by Smith's performances. Pete Paphides, writing for The Times, said that the songs were performed "with power and restraint", while Johnny Davis, writing for The Observer, said "[y]ou can practically hear Katherine Jenkins weep as Faryl flawlessly executes Amazing Grace". Jason Birchmeier, writing for Allmusic, considered Smith's performance even more noteworthy because of her young age. However, though he considered Smith's voice impressive, Malcolm Mackenzie, writing for The London Paper, asked "will we care when the kid from Kettering loses her precocious appeal?" Reviewers also responded positively to Cohen's contribution to the album. Paphides claimed that his arrangements "suggest some kind of aesthetic endeavour beyond the basic thing for which they exist", while Birchmeier claimed that the album was "produced with fine precision".

Reviewers were more critical of the use of the orchestra. Helen Sloan, writing for Crackerjack (Bristol Evening Post) found that the orchestra rendered "the whole thing a bit bland and movie-soundtrack", and Birchmeier found it to be "a bit overwhelming" by the end of the album. Further, he was critical of the inclusion of "Amazing Grace" and "Ave Maria", considering them to be overly predictable song choices. Though he was pleasantly surprised by some of the inclusions (such as "River of Light" and "The Way Old Friends Do"), he concluded that "[i]t's too bad that [Smith] isn't given more creative material to sing. One hopes her next album is more adventurous."

Overall, Paphides awarded the album 3 out of a possible 5 stars, and compared it favourably to three other Mothering Sunday releases, Lionel Richie's Just Go, Ronan Keating's Songs for My Mother and Barry Manilow's The Greatest Songs of the Eighties, considering it stronger than any of the others. Davis also awarded the album 3 out of 5, while Birchmeier was slightly more positive, awarding Faryl 3.5 out of 5.

== Performance ==
At the beginning of February, Faryl was placed at 295 in Amazon.co.uk's best-sellers chart and 13 in its easy listening chart, based on pre-orders alone. A week before its release, the album was in the top-100-selling albums, and was the top-selling opera album. On the day of the release, based only on presales, the album was at the number 1 spot on the UK Albums Chart. The album became the fastest-selling classical solo album in Britain, beating Hayley Westenra's Pure, selling 20,000 copies in the first four days. The first week resulted in sales of 29,200 copies, which is higher than any other debut album of a classical singer. Faryl officially entered the UK Albums Chart at number 6, and climbed to number 4 the following week. Faryl made Smith the third former Britain's Got Talent contestant to achieve a top-ten album, after Paul Potts (with One Chance) and Andrew Johnston (with One Voice). In the US, Faryl peaked at 31 on Top Heatseekers Albums chart, and at 6 on the Classical Albums chart, remaining in the charts for one and 17 weeks respectively. By February 2010, over 160,000 copies of Faryl had been sold, with over 150,000 of these in the UK. In July 2013, the British Phonographic Industry certified the album gold, denoting shipments of over 100,000 units in the United Kingdom.

In February 2010, after the release of Wonderland, Faryl was nominated for a Classical BRIT Award in the album category. The category is voted for by the public, and the shortlist comprises the ten best-selling classical albums of the previous year. Faryl lost to Only Men Aloud's Band of Brothers. Smith herself was also nominated in the young British classical performer category, becoming the youngest-ever double Classical BRIT nominee.

== Track listing ==
No.	Title	Music	Length
1.	"Amazing Grace"	John Newton	4:04
2.	"The River of Light"	Johann Strauss II	3:44
3.	"Ave Maria"	Charles Gounod	4:18
4.	"Annie's Song"	John Denver	3:10
5.	"A Nightingale Sang in Berkeley Square"	Manning Sherwin	3:39
6.	"Mother of God, Here I Stand"	John Tavener	2:36
7.	"Shenandoah"	Traditional	3:35
8.	"Brahms' Lullaby"	Johannes Brahms	3:30
9.	"Calon Lân"	John Hughes	2:56
10.	"How Can I Keep from Singing?"	Traditional	3:26
11.	"Somewhere"	Leonard Bernstein	3:29
12.	"The Way Old Friends Do"	Benny Andersson	3:22
13.	"Danny Boy" (bonus track on the Deluxe Edition of the album)	Traditional

== Personnel ==
- Edgar Leslie Bainton – Assistance
- Andy Bradfield – Mixing
- Nick Cervonaro – Digital editing
- Paul Chessell – Design
- Barry Clark – Children's choirmaster
- Jon Cohen – Guitar, piano, arrangement, programming and production
- Rupert Coulson – Engineering
- Tony Dunne – A&R
- Tom Lewis – A&R
- The London Session Orchestra – Orchestra
- Darren Loveday – Guitar and mandolin
- Steve Lowe – Engineering
- Cliff Masterson – Arrangement, conducting and orchestration
- Jennie O'Grady – Choir conducting
- Maureen Scott – Vocal coaching
- David Theodore – Oboe
- Alan Unsworth – Engineering

== Charts ==
=== Chart positions ===
Chart	Peak position
UK Albums Chart	4
US Top Heatseekers	31
US Top Classical	6
