= 2009 FA Cup final =

English football match

- Event: 2008–09 FA Cup
Chelsea	Everton
2	1
- Date: 30 May 2009
- Venue: Wembley Stadium, London
- Man of the Match: Ashley Cole (Chelsea)
- Referee: Howard Webb (South Yorkshire)
- Attendance: 89,391

The 2009 FA Cup final was the 128th final of the world's oldest domestic football cup competition, the FA Cup. The final was played at Wembley Stadium in London on 30 May 2009 and marked the third time that the final has been staged at the stadium since it was rebuilt. The match was contested by Chelsea, who beat Arsenal 2–1 in their semi-final, and Everton who beat Manchester United 4–2 on penalties after a 0–0 draw after extra time. After Louis Saha opened the scoring after just 25 seconds, which is the second fastest ever goal in an FA Cup Final, Didier Drogba equalised in the 21st minute before Frank Lampard scored the winner with 19 minutes left to play to give Chelsea their fifth FA Cup success.

== Background ==
Chelsea went into the match as four-time FA Cup winners, having previously won in 1970, 1997, 2000 and 2007, while Everton had won the competition five times previously, having won in 1906, 1933, 1966, 1984 and 1995. Coincidentally, both teams' most recent titles came in the FA Cup, both teams beating Manchester United in the final; Everton in 1995 and Chelsea in 2007.

The two teams drew 0–0 in both meetings during the 2008–09 Premier League season, at Goodison Park in December and at Stamford Bridge in April. Prior to the 2009 final, the two teams had never met in the FA Cup Final; their most recent meeting in the FA Cup came in the Fourth Round of the 2005–06 competition, when Chelsea won 4–1 in a replay at Stamford Bridge after a 1–1 draw at Goodison Park. In 157 matches between the two sides in all competitions, Chelsea had recorded 61 wins, Everton had won 49, and 47 matches finished as draws.

== Route to the final ==
Chelsea		Round	Everton	
Southend United [L1] H 1–1	Kalou 31'	Third Round	Macclesfield Town [L2] A 1–0	Osman 43'
Southend United [L1] A 4–1	Ballack 45', Kalou 60', Anelka 78', Lampard 90'	Replay	Macclesfield Town [L2] A 1–0	Osman 43'
Ipswich Town [C] H 3–1	Ballack 16', 59', Lampard 85'	Fourth Round	Liverpool [PL] A 1–1	Lescott 27'
Ipswich Town [C] H 3–1	Ballack 16', 59', Lampard 85'	Replay	Liverpool [PL] H 1–0	Gosling 118'
Watford [C] A 3–1	Anelka 75', 77', 90'	Fifth Round	Aston Villa [PL] H 3–1	Rodwell 4', Arteta 24' (pen.), Cahill 76'
Coventry City [C] A 2–0	Drogba 15', Alex 72'	Sixth Round	Middlesbrough [PL] H 2–1	Fellaini 50', Saha 56'
Arsenal [PL] Wembley Stadium, London; 2–1	Malouda 33', Drogba 84'	Semi-finals	Manchester United [PL] Wembley Stadium, London; 0–0 (4–2 p)	

- Both clubs received a bye to round three.
- In square brackets is a letter that represents the opposition's division
  - [PL] = Premier League
  - [C] = Championship
  - [L1] = League One
  - [L2] = League Two

== Pre-match ==
=== Ticketing ===
Everton and Chelsea were each allocated 25,109 tickets for the final. Having sold over 32,000 for their semi-final win over Manchester United, Everton were unhappy and disappointed with this allocation. The match was Everton's first FA Cup final in 14 years and Everton chief executive Robert Elstone predicted that the club could have sold in excess of 70,000 tickets for this game. Chelsea also said that the size of their allocation meant that it was unlikely that there would be sufficient tickets for all of their hospitality and non-hospitality season ticket holders.

Club Wembley ten-year season ticket holders were also guaranteed a ticket for the match. After those tickets were allocated, 70% of the remaining tickets were distributed amongst the clubs that had competed in the 2008–09 competition, with the other 30% given to those involved in grassroots football and the "football family".

=== Kits ===
Since both finalists' first-choice kits are predominantly blue, a coin was tossed to determine which team would have the first choice of kit. Everton won the toss and chose to wear their traditional blue kit, meaning that Chelsea would wear their all-yellow third-choice kit. Chelsea were nevertheless given the "home" dressing room, i.e. that used by the England national team.

=== Match ball ===
The official match ball of the 2009 FA Cup Final was the Umbro Dynamis. The Dynamis uses a 20-panel configuration, as opposed to a more traditional 32-panel design, which allegedly makes the ball faster. The surface of the ball is made from a Teijin microfibre material. The Dynamis was also used in the 2008 final, but the 2009 version has a gold colourway.

=== Opening ceremony ===
The traditional FA Cup Final song, Abide With Me, was performed by the London Community Gospel Choir. The trophy was then brought out onto the field, followed by the two teams, before the Chief Guest of the final – former Secretary General of the United Nations Kofi Annan – was introduced to the managers and players of both teams, as well as the match officials. The introductions were immediately followed by the singing of the national anthem, "God Save the Queen", sung by Britain's Got Talent 2008 finalist, 13-year-old Faryl Smith, making her the youngest performer of the national anthem at the FA Cup final.

== Match ==
=== Team selection ===
Everton were without long-term injury victims Phil Jagielka, Mikel Arteta, Yakubu Aiyegbeni, Victor Anichebe and Nuno Valente. On-loan Brazilian striker Jô was cup-tied. Andy van der Meyde, who set up the winning goal in the fourth round tie with Liverpool, had since been released by the club. This meant that there was a place on the Everton bench for 17-year-old winger Jose Baxter.

=== Summary ===
==== First half ====
Louis Saha scored for Everton with a left-footed shot to the bottom-left corner just 25 seconds into the match. The previous fastest goal was by Bob Chatt of Aston Villa 30 seconds into the 1895 final. It would the fastest goal scored in FA Cup final history until the 2023 final, when Manchester City's İlkay Gündoğan scored after 13 seconds. Tony Hibbert received a yellow card for tripping Florent Malouda in the eighth minute. Didier Drogba levelled the match for Chelsea in the 21st minute with a header set up by a left-wing cross from Malouda.

==== Second half ====
Tony Hibbert was replaced by Lars Jacobsen for Everton to begin the second half, and two minutes in, Toffees captain Phil Neville was booked. Chelsea replaced Michael Essien with Michael Ballack in the 61st minute, followed two minutes later by a yellow card for Mikel John Obi. Frank Lampard scored the winning goal for Chelsea in the 72nd minute with a left foot shot. Five minutes later, a shot from Malouda appeared to crash down off the bar and over the line, but it was not given. Everton replaced Saha with James Vaughan at that point. Dan Gosling was the last substitute for Everton in the 81st minute, replacing Leon Osman. Lampard received a yellow card in the 84th minute, while in the fourth minute of added time, Leighton Baines of Everton was booked.

=== Details ===
30 May 2009
15:00 BST

Chelsea	2–1	Everton
Drogba 21'; Lampard 72'	Report	Saha 1'

Wembley Stadium, London
Attendance: 89,391
Referee: Howard Webb (South Yorkshire)

Chelsea	Everton

GK	1	(Czech Republic) Petr Čech
RB	17	(Portugal) José Bosingwa
CB	33	(Brazil) Alex
CB	26	(England) John Terry (c)
LB	3	(England) Ashley Cole
DM	5	(Ghana) Michael Essien		(substituted off) 61'
CM	12	(Nigeria) Mikel John Obi	(yellow card) 63'
CM	8	(England) Frank Lampard	(yellow card) 84'
RW	39	(France) Nicolas Anelka
LW	15	(France) Florent Malouda
CF	11	(Ivory Coast) Didier Drogba
Substitutes:
GK	40	(Portugal) Hilário
DF	2	(Serbia) Branislav Ivanović
DF	35	(Brazil) Juliano Belletti
DF	42	(England) Michael Mancienne
MF	13	(Germany) Michael Ballack		(substituted on) 61'
FW	9	(Argentina) Franco Di Santo
FW	21	(Ivory Coast) Salomon Kalou
Manager:
(Netherlands) Guus Hiddink

GK	24	(United States) Tim Howard
RB	2	(England) Tony Hibbert	(yellow card) 8'	(substituted off) 46'
CB	4	(Nigeria) Joseph Yobo
CB	5	(England) Joleon Lescott
LB	3	(England) Leighton Baines	(yellow card) 90+4'
RM	18	(England) Phil Neville (c)	(yellow card) 47'
CM	21	(England) Leon Osman		(substituted off) 82'
CM	25	(Belgium) Marouane Fellaini
LM	20	(South Africa) Steven Pienaar
AM	17	(Australia) Tim Cahill
CF	9	(France) Louis Saha		(substituted off) 75'
Substitutes:
GK	1	(England) Carlo Nash
DF	15	(Denmark) Lars Jacobsen		(substituted on) 46'
MF	8	(Ecuador) Segundo Castillo
MF	26	(England) Jack Rodwell
MF	32	(England) Dan Gosling		(substituted on) 82'
MF	37	(England) Jose Baxter
FW	14	(England) James Vaughan		(substituted on) 75'
Manager:
(Scotland) David Moyes

Match officials

- Assistant referees:
  - Mike Mullarkey (Devon)
  - David Richardson (West Yorkshire)
- Fourth official: Martin Atkinson (West Yorkshire)

Match rules

- 90 minutes
- 30 minutes of extra-time if necessary
- Penalty shoot-out if scores still level
- Seven named substitutes
- Maximum of three substitutions

=== Statistics ===
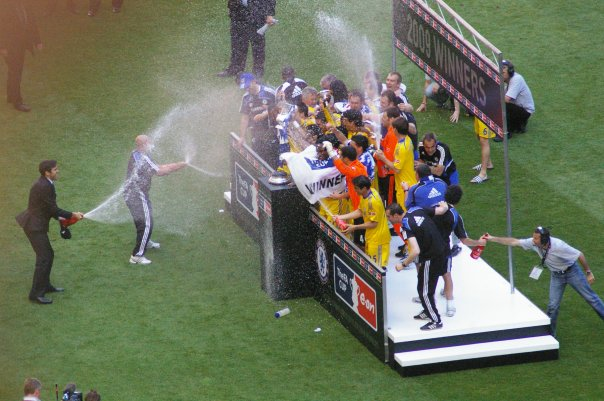
The Chelsea players celebrate winning the FA Cup for the fifth time.

	Chelsea	Everton
Goals scored	2	1
Total shots	12	6
Shots on target	4	2
Ball possession	58%	42%
Corner kicks	5	1
Fouls committed	12	17
Offsides	2	3
Yellow cards	2	3
Red cards	0	0

==== Records ====
- Louis Saha scored the fastest ever FA Cup Final goal when he drove home with just 25 seconds on the clock to put Everton ahead. This was later broken in 2023 when İlkay Gündoğan scored after 12 seconds for Manchester City against Manchester United.
- Ashley Cole collected his fifth FA Cup winners' medal, and became the first man to win the cup five times since the 19th century.
- Everton's defeat meant that they finished as FA Cup runners-up for the eighth time, more than any other club.

== Sources ==
- Chelsea - Everton 2-1
