= 2008–09 FA Cup =

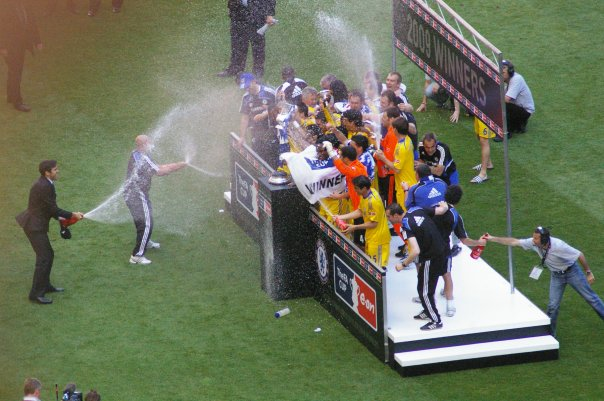
- Chelsea celebrating their 5th title

Tournament details
- Country: England; Wales
- Teams: 762

Final positions
- Champions: Chelsea (5th title)
- Runners-up: Everton

Tournament statistics
- Top goal scorer(s): Nicolas Anelka; Matty Fryatt; Gary Hooper; Robin van Persie; Craig Westcarr (4 goals each)

The 2008–09 FA Cup (known as the FA Cup sponsored by E.ON for sponsorship reasons) was the 128th season of the world's oldest football knockout competition; the FA Cup. A record 762 clubs were accepted for the competition; one club, South Normanton Athletic, folded before the fixtures were released, leaving 761 clubs to appear in the draw. Two more clubs, Brierley Hill & Withymoor and Stapenhill, folded after the draws for the early rounds were made, giving their opponents a walkover.

The competition started on 16 August 2008 with the Extra preliminary round and concluded on 30 May 2009 with the Final, held at Wembley Stadium. Because winners Chelsea qualified for the 2009–10 UEFA Champions League by finishing 3rd in the 2008–09 Premier League, losing finalists Everton qualified for the play-off round of the 2009–10 UEFA Europa League. Because Everton also happened to qualify for a Europa League berth by finishing 5th in the Premier League, that berth was awarded to the 6th place team (Aston Villa), whose berth (which was available because 2009–10 Football League Cup winners Manchester United qualified for the Champions League as Premier League winners) was in turn awarded to the 7th place team (Fulham).

Premier League side Portsmouth were the defending champions, but were elimated in the fourth round by Swansea City.

This season's competition saw the beginning of a new television contract for the tournament, with ITV and Setanta Sports taking over the domestic rights from the BBC and Sky Sports, however this would prove to be the only season in which Setanta broadcast the competition, as it went into administration and closed down a few weeks after the final.

== Calendar ==
Round	Main date	Number of fixtures	Clubs	New entries this round	Prize money	Player of the Round
Extra preliminary round	16 August 2008	203	761 → 558	406: 356th–761st	£750	n/a
Preliminary round	30 August 2008	166	558 → 392	129: 227th–355th	£1,500	n/a
First round qualifying	13 September 2008	116	392 → 276	66: 161st–226th	£3,000	Derren Ibrahim (Dartford)
Second round qualifying	27 September 2008	80	276 → 196	44: 117th–160th	£4,500	Dean Lodge (Kingstonian)
Third round qualifying	11 October 2008	40	196 → 156	none	£7,500	Craig Davis (AFC Totton)
Fourth round qualifying	25 October 2008	32	156 → 124	24: 93rd–116th	£12,500	Sam Hatton (AFC Wimbledon)
First round proper	8 November 2008	40	124 → 84	48: 45th–92nd	£20,000	Jon Adams (AFC Telford United)
Second round proper	29 November 2008	20	84 → 64	none	£30,000	Lindon Meikle (Eastwood Town)
Third round proper	3 January 2009	32	64 → 32	44: 1st–44th	£75,000	Nathan Tyson (Nottingham Forest)
Fourth round proper	24 January 2009	16	32 → 16	none	£100,000	Scott Parker (West Ham United)
Fifth round proper	14 February 2009	8	16 → 8	none	£200,000	Mikel Arteta (Everton)
Sixth round proper	7 March 2009	4	8 → 4	none	£400,000	Robin van Persie (Arsenal)
Semi-finals	18 April 2009; 19 April 2009	2	4 → 2	none	Winners: £1,000,000; Losers: £500,000	Phil Jagielka (Everton)
Final	30 May 2009	1	2 → 1	none	Winner: £2,000,000; Loser: £1,000,000	

== Qualifying rounds ==
All teams that entered the competition, but were not members of the Premier League or The Football League, had to compete in the qualifying rounds to secure one of 32 places available in the first round proper.

The winners from the fourth qualifying round were Curzon Ashton, Kettering Town, Barrow, Kidderminster Harriers, Cambridge United, Altrincham, Droylsden, Histon, Alfreton Town, Blyth Spartans, Mansfield Town, AFC Telford United, Fleetwood Town, Eastwood Town, Stevenage Borough, Brackley Town, Ebbsfleet United, Oxford United, AFC Wimbledon, Team Bath, Dorchester Town, Eastbourne Borough, Forest Green Rovers, Bury Town, Harlow Town, Grays Athletic, Evesham United, Sutton United, Torquay United, Leiston, Havant & Waterlooville and AFC Hornchurch. These teams came from the following levels:

- 14 teams from Level 5 (Conference National)
- 9 from Level 6: 5 Conference North, 4 Conference South
- 6 from Level 7: 1 Northern Premier League, 2 Southern League, 3 Isthmian League
- 2 from Level 8: Curzon Ashton of the NPL North and Bury Town of the Southern League Midland
- 1 from Level 9: Leiston of the Eastern Counties League Premier Division

Three 'phoenix' clubs were appearing in the main draw for the first time: AFC Telford United reached this stage four years after the demise of the original Telford United F.C., AFC Wimbledon were here four years after Wimbledon F.C. became Milton Keynes Dons and AFC Hornchurch qualified for the main draw three years after the demise of the original Hornchurch F.C. Of the other teams, Curzon Ashton, Brackley Town, Evesham United and Leiston were also appearing in the competition proper for the first time while Dorchester Town had last done so in 2000-01, Eastwood Town had last done so in 1999-2000, Blyth Spartans had last done so in 1997-98, Sutton United in 1995-96, Harlow Town in 1991-92 and Bury Town in 1968-69.

== First round proper ==
All of the 24 League One and 24 League Two teams entered in this round, along with the winners of the previous round, the fourth qualifying round.

The draw took place on 26 October 2008. The matches were played between 7 and 9 November 2008.

Tie no	Home team	Score	Away team	Attendance
1	Colchester United (3)	0 – 1	Leyton Orient (3)	4,600
2	Havant & Waterlooville (6)	1 – 3	Brentford (4)	1,631
3	Blyth Spartans (6)	3 – 1	Shrewsbury Town (4)	2,742
4	Sutton United (7)	0 – 1	Notts County (4)	2,041
5	Torquay United (5)	2 – 0	Evesham United (7)	2,275
6	Oxford United (5)	0 – 0	Dorchester Town (6)	3,196
replay	Dorchester Town (6)	1 – 3†	Oxford United (5)	1,474
7	Bury (4)	0 – 1	Gillingham (4)	2,161
8	AFC Wimbledon (6)	1 – 4	Wycombe Wanderers (4)	4,528
9	Chester City (4)	0 – 3	Millwall (3)	1,932
10	Carlisle United (3)	1 – 1	Grays Athletic (5)	3,921
replay‡	Grays Athletic (5)	0 – 2	Carlisle United (3)	1,217
11	Team Bath (6)	0 – 1	Forest Green Rovers (5)	906
12	Eastbourne Borough (5)	0 – 0	Barrow (5)	1,216
replay	Barrow (5)	4 – 0	Eastbourne Borough (5)	2,131
13	AFC Hornchurch (7)	0 – 1	Peterborough United (3)	3,000
14	Yeovil Town (3)	1 – 1	Stockport County (3)	3,582
replay	Stockport County (3)	5 – 0	Yeovil Town (3)	3,260
15	Leiston (9)	0 – 0	Fleetwood Town (6)	1,250
replay	Fleetwood Town (6)	2 – 0	Leiston (9)	2,010
16	Accrington Stanley (4)	0 – 0	Tranmere Rovers (3)	2,126
replay	Tranmere Rovers (3)	1 – 0	Accrington Stanley (4)	2,560
17	Walsall (3)	1 – 3	Scunthorpe United (3)	2,318
18	AFC Bournemouth (4)	1 – 0	Bristol Rovers (3)	3,935
19	Brighton & Hove Albion (3)	3 – 3	Hartlepool United (3)	2,545
replay	Hartlepool United (3)	2 – 1	Brighton & Hove Albion (3)	3,288
20	Aldershot Town (4)	1 – 1	Rotherham United (4)	2,632
replay	Rotherham United (4)	0 – 3	Aldershot Town (4)	2,431

Tie no	Home team	Score	Away team	Attendance
21	Morecambe (4)	2 – 1	Grimsby Town (4)	1,713
22	Huddersfield Town (3)	3 – 4	Port Vale (4)	6,942
23	Alfreton Town (6)	4 – 2	Bury Town (8)	1,060
24	Kidderminster Harriers (5)	1 – 0	Cambridge United (5)	1,717
25	Leicester City (3)	3 – 0	Stevenage Borough (5)	7,586
26	Milton Keynes Dons (3)	1 – 2	Bradford City (4)	5,542
27	Darlington (4)	0 – 0	Droylsden (6)	2,479
replay	Droylsden (6)	1 – 0	Darlington (4)	1,672
28	Chesterfield (4)	3 – 1	Mansfield Town (5)	6,612
29	AFC Telford United (6)	2 – 2	Southend United (3)	3,631
replay	Southend United (3)	2 – 0	AFC Telford United (6)	4,415
30	Curzon Ashton (8)	3 – 2	Exeter City (4)	1,259
31	Histon (5)	1 – 0	Swindon Town (3)	1,541
32	Kettering Town (5)	1 – 1	Lincoln City (4)	3,314
replay	Lincoln City (4)	1 – 2	Kettering Town (5)	3,953
33	Barnet (4)	1 – 1	Rochdale (4)	1,782
replay	Rochdale (4)	3 – 2†	Barnet (4)	2,339
34	Hereford United (3)	0 – 0	Dagenham & Redbridge (4)	1,825
replay	Dagenham & Redbridge (4)	2 – 1	Hereford United (3)	1,409
35	Cheltenham Town (3)	2 – 2	Oldham Athletic (3)	2,585
replay	Oldham Athletic (3)	0 – 1	Cheltenham Town (3)	2,552
36	Luton Town (4)	0 – 0	Altrincham (5)	3,200
replay	Altrincham (5)	0 – 0	Luton Town (4)	2,397
Luton Town won 4–2 on penalties
37	Crewe Alexandra (3)	1 – 0	Ebbsfleet United (5)	2,593
38	Eastwood Town (7)	2 – 1	Brackley Town (7)	960
39	Leeds United (3)	1 – 1	Northampton Town (3)	9,531
replay	Northampton Town (3)	2 – 5	Leeds United (3)	3,960
40	Harlow Town (7)	0 – 2	Macclesfield Town (4)	2,149

† – After extra time

‡ – Grays' replay with Carlisle was abandoned the first time it was played after 20 minutes because of floodlight failure with Grays leading 1–0.

Blyth Spartans, Droylsden and Histon beat teams from two levels higher. Kettering Town were the fourth non-league team to beat a league club. Curzon Ashton were the only club to beat a team from four levels higher, beating Exeter City.

== Second round proper ==
The draw was held on 9 November 2008 and involved the 40 winning teams from the previous round. These were from the following levels:

- 13 from Level 3 (League One)
- 14 from Level 4 (League Two)
- 7 from Level 5 (Conference National)
- 4 from Level 6 (all Conference North)
- 1 from Level 7 (Eastwood Town of the Northern Premier League Premier Division)
- 1 from Level 8 (Curzon Ashton of the Northern Premier League North)

The draw was conducted by Lawrie Sanchez and Ray Parlour. Matches in the second round proper were played over the weekend of 29 November 2008, with the exception of the match between Crewe Alexandra and Carlisle United, which was played on 3 December, due to the abandonment of the first-round game between Carlisle United and Grays Athletic.

Tie no	Home team	Score	Away team	Attendance
1‡	Chesterfield (4)	2 – 2	Droylsden (6)	5,698
replay‡	Droylsden (6)	2 – 1	Chesterfield (4)	2,824
Droylsden expelled for fielding an ineligible player; Chesterfield progress
2	Peterborough United (3)	0 – 0	Tranmere Rovers (3)	5,980
replay	Tranmere Rovers (3)	1 – 2†	Peterborough United (3)	3,139
3	Eastwood Town (7)	2 – 0	Wycombe Wanderers (4)	1,955
4	Notts County (4)	1 – 1	Kettering Town (5)	4,451
replay	Kettering Town (5)	2 – 1	Notts County (4)	3,019
5	Leicester City (3)	3 – 2	Dagenham & Redbridge (4)	7,791
6	Barrow (5)	2 – 1	Brentford (4)	3,532
7	Bradford City (4)	1 – 2	Leyton Orient (3)	5,065
8	Southend United (3)	3 – 1	Luton Town (4)	4,111
9	Forest Green Rovers (5)	2 – 0	Rochdale (4)	1,715
10	Histon (5)	1 – 0	Leeds United (3)	4,103
11	Scunthorpe United (3)	4 – 0	Alfreton Town (6)	4,249
12	Torquay United (5)	2 – 0	Oxford United (5)	2,647
13	Fleetwood Town (6)	2 – 3	Hartlepool United (3)	3,280
14	Morecambe (4)	2 – 3	Cheltenham Town (3)	1,758
15	Gillingham (4)	0 – 0	Stockport County (3)	4,419
replay	Stockport County (3)	1 – 2	Gillingham (4)	3,329
16	Millwall (3)	3 – 0	Aldershot Town (4)	6,159
17	Carlisle United (3)	0 – 2	Crewe Alexandra (3)	2,755
18	AFC Bournemouth (4)	0 – 0	Blyth Spartans (6)	4,165
replay	Blyth Spartans (6)	1 – 0	AFC Bournemouth (4)	4,040
19	Kidderminster Harriers (5)	2 – 0	Curzon Ashton (8)	2,070
20	Port Vale (4)	1 – 3	Macclesfield Town (4)	4,684

† – After extra time

‡ – Droylsden's first visit to Chesterfield was abandoned at half time due to fog. The first replay, two weeks later, was then abandoned after 70 minutes due to floodlight failure.

6 non-league clubs beat league clubs: Leeds United lost to Histon, while League Two clubs lost to Eastwood Town, Blyth Spartans, Barrow, Forest Green Rovers and Kettering Town.

== Third round proper ==
The draw was held on 30 November 2008. The draw was carried out by Sir Trevor Brooking and Ray Clemence at Soho Square. The 20 Premier League and 24 Championship teams enter at this stage, along with the 20 winners from the previous round. These 20 teams came from the following levels:

- 9 from Level 3 (League One)
- 3 from Level 4 (League Two)
- 6 from Level 5 (Conference National)
- 1 from Level 6 (Blyth Spartans of the Conference North)
- 1 from Level 7 (Eastwood Town of the Northern Premier League Premier Division)

The matches were played between 2 and 5 January 2009, with the exception of the ties between Birmingham City and Wolverhampton Wanderers, Histon and Swansea City, Cheltenham Town and Doncaster Rovers, and Leyton Orient and Sheffield United, which were postponed until 13 January 2009.

Tie no	Home team	Score	Away team	Attendance
1	Portsmouth (1)	0 – 0	Bristol City (2)	14,446
replay	Bristol City (2)	0 – 2	Portsmouth (1)	14,302
2	Sheffield Wednesday (2)	1 – 2	Fulham (1)	18,377
3	Preston North End (2)	0 – 2	Liverpool (1)	23,046
4	Birmingham City (2)	0 – 2	Wolverhampton Wanderers (2)	22,232
5	West Ham United (1)	3 – 0	Barnsley (2)	28,869
6	Middlesbrough (1)	2 – 1	Barrow (5)	25,132
7	Hull City (1)	0 – 0	Newcastle United (1)	20,557
replay	Newcastle United (1)	0 – 1	Hull City (1)	31,380
8	Hartlepool United (3)	2 – 0	Stoke City (1)	5,367
9	Chelsea (1)	1 – 1	Southend United (3)	41,090
replay	Southend United (3)	1 – 4	Chelsea (1)	11,314
10	Manchester City (1)	0 – 3	Nottingham Forest (2)	31,869
11	Cardiff City (2)	2 – 0	Reading (2)	12,448
12	Ipswich Town (2)	3 – 0	Chesterfield (4)	12,524
13	Charlton Athletic (2)	1 – 1	Norwich City (2)	12,615
replay	Norwich City (2)	0 – 1	Charlton Athletic (2)	13,997
14	West Bromwich Albion (1)	1 – 1	Peterborough United (3)	18,659
replay	Peterborough United (3)	0 – 2	West Bromwich Albion (1)	10,735
15	Torquay United (5)	1 – 0	Blackpool (2)	3,654
16	Leyton Orient (3)	1 – 4	Sheffield United (2)	4,527
17	Southampton (2)	0 – 3	Manchester United (1)	31,901
18	Millwall (3)	2 – 2	Crewe Alexandra (3)	5,754
replay	Crewe Alexandra (3)	2 – 3	Millwall (3)	3,060
19	Histon (5)	1 – 2	Swansea City (2)	2,821
20	Forest Green Rovers (5)	3 – 4	Derby County (2)	4,836
21	Queens Park Rangers (2)	0 – 0	Burnley (2)	8,896
replay	Burnley (2)	2 – 1†	Queens Park Rangers (2)	3,760
22	Leicester City (3)	0 – 0	Crystal Palace (2)	15,976
replay	Crystal Palace (2)	2 – 1	Leicester City (3)	6,023
23	Tottenham Hotspur (1)	3 – 1	Wigan Athletic (1)	34,040
24	Cheltenham Town (3)	0 – 0	Doncaster Rovers (2)	4,417
replay	Doncaster Rovers (2)	3 – 0	Cheltenham Town (3)	5,345
25	Arsenal (1)	3 – 1	Plymouth Argyle (2)	59,424
26	Kettering Town (5)	2 – 1	Eastwood Town (7)	5,090
27	Blyth Spartans (6)	0 – 1	Blackburn Rovers (1)	3,445
28	Macclesfield Town (4)	0 – 1	Everton (1)	6,008
29	Watford (2)	1 – 0	Scunthorpe United (3)	8,690
30	Sunderland (1)	2 – 1	Bolton Wanderers (1)	20,685
31	Coventry City (2)	2 – 0	Kidderminster Harriers (5)	13,652
32	Gillingham (4)	1 – 2	Aston Villa (1)	10,107

† – After extra time

Torquay United were the only team to beat a team from three levels higher, while Hartlepool United were the only team to beat a team from two levels higher.

== Fourth round proper ==
The draw was held on 4 January 2009. It comprised teams from the following levels:

- 15 from the Premier League
- 13 from the Championship
- 2 from League One
- 0 from League Two
- 2 from the Conference National

The draw was conducted by Roberto Di Matteo and Dave Beasant. Most of the matches were played on the weekend of 24 January 2009.

A technical error during ITV's broadcast of the Everton–Liverpool replay meant that millions of viewers missed Dan Gosling's winner for Everton late in extra time. Coverage of the match was temporarily interrupted by advertisements, only for viewers to see Everton's players celebrating upon the restoration of the feed. ITV received thousands of complaints about the mistake, with many viewers questioning ITV's ability to broadcast live football, especially given their £275 million contract with The Football Association. ITV has subsequently apologised for the error.

Tie no	Home team	Score	Away team	Attendance
1	Liverpool (1)	1 – 1	Everton (1)	43,524
replay	Everton (1)	1 – 0†	Liverpool (1)	37,918
2	Manchester United (1)	2 – 1	Tottenham Hotspur (1)	75,014
3	Hull City (1)	2 – 0	Millwall (3)	18,639
4	Sunderland (1)	0 – 0	Blackburn Rovers (1)	22,634
replay	Blackburn Rovers (1)	2 – 1†	Sunderland (1)	10,112
5	Hartlepool United (3)	0 – 2	West Ham United (1)	6,849
6	Sheffield United (2)	2 – 1	Charlton Athletic (2)	15,957
7	Cardiff City (2)	0 – 0	Arsenal (1)	20,079
replay	Arsenal (1)	4 – 0	Cardiff City (2)	57,237
8	Portsmouth (1)	0 – 2	Swansea City (2)	17,357
9	Chelsea (1)	3 – 1	Ipswich Town (2)	41,137
10	Doncaster Rovers (2)	0 – 0	Aston Villa (1)	13,517
replay	Aston Villa (1)	3 – 1	Doncaster Rovers (2)	24,203
11	West Bromwich Albion (1)	2 – 2	Burnley (2)	18,294
replay	Burnley (2)	3 – 1	West Bromwich Albion (1)	6,635
12	Torquay United (5)	0 – 1	Coventry City (2)	6,018
13	Kettering Town (5)	2 – 4	Fulham (1)	5,406
14	Watford (2)	4 – 3	Crystal Palace (2)	10,006
15	Derby County (2)	1 – 1	Nottingham Forest (2)	32,035
replay	Nottingham Forest (2)	2 – 3	Derby County (2)	29,001
16	Wolverhampton Wanderers (2)	1 – 2	Middlesbrough (1)	18,013

† – After extra time

== Fifth round proper ==
The draw was held on 25 January 2009. It comprised ten teams from the Premier League and six from the Championship, and was conducted by Gary Mabbutt and Gary Pallister. The fifth-round matches were played on the weekend of 14 February 2009, with the exception of the tie between Arsenal and Burnley, after Arsenal's fourth round replay with Cardiff City was postponed due to snow. The match was played on 8 March 2009.

Tie no	Home team	Score	Away team	Attendance
1	Sheffield United (2)	1 – 1	Hull City (1)	22,283
replay	Hull City (1)	2 – 1	Sheffield United (2)	17,239
2	Watford (2)	1 – 3	Chelsea (1)	16,851
3	West Ham United (1)	1 – 1	Middlesbrough (1)	33,658
replay	Middlesbrough (1)	2 – 0	West Ham United (1)	15,602
4	Blackburn Rovers (1)	2 – 2	Coventry City (2)	15,053
replay	Coventry City (2)	1 – 0	Blackburn Rovers (1)	22,793
5	Derby County (2)	1 – 4	Manchester United (1)	32,103
6	Swansea City (2)	1 – 1	Fulham (1)	16,573
replay	Fulham (1)	2 – 1	Swansea City (2)	12,316
7	Everton (1)	3 – 1	Aston Villa (1)	35,439
8	Arsenal (1)	3 – 0	Burnley (2)	57,454

== Sixth round proper ==
The draw was held on 15 February 2009. It comprised seven teams from the Premier League and Coventry City from the Championship. It was conducted by Frank McLintock and Graeme Souness. The matches were played on the weekend of 7 March 2009, with the exception of the tie between Arsenal and Hull City, which was played on 17 March.

7 March 2009
12:30 GMT

Coventry City (2)	0–2	Chelsea (1)
	Report	Drogba 15'; Alex 72'

Ricoh Arena, Coventry
Attendance: 31,407
Referee: Steve Bennett (Kent)

7 March 2009
17:15 GMT

Fulham (1)	0–4	Manchester United (1)
	Report	Tevez 20', 35'; Rooney 50'; Park 81'

Craven Cottage, London
Attendance: 24,662
Referee: Mike Dean (Cheshire)

17 March 2009
19:45 GMT

Arsenal (1)	2–1	Hull City (1)
Van Persie 74'; Gallas 84'	Report	Barmby 13'

Emirates Stadium, London
Attendance: 55,641
Referee: Mike Riley (West Yorkshire)

8 March 2009
16:00 GMT

Everton (1)	2–1	Middlesbrough (1)
Fellaini 50'; Saha 56'	Report	Wheater 44'

Goodison Park, Liverpool
Attendance: 37,856
Referee: Mark Halsey (Lancashire)

== Semi-finals ==
The draw was held on 8 March 2009, and was conducted by Bob Wilson and Joe Royle. The semi-final matches were played at Wembley Stadium, on the weekend of 18 April 2009. Unlike the previous rounds, replays were not held if a match ended as a draw; if necessary, extra time was added and a penalty shoot-out was held immediately after the match.

18 April 2009
17:15 BST

Arsenal (1)	1–2	Chelsea (1)
Walcott 18'	Report	Malouda 33'; Drogba 84'

Wembley Stadium, London
Attendance: 88,103
Referee: Martin Atkinson (West Yorkshire)

19 April 2009
16:00 BST

Manchester United (1)	0–0 (a.e.t.)	Everton (1)
	Report
Penalties
Berbatov (penalty missed); Ferdinand (penalty missed); Vidić (penalty scored); Anderson (penalty scored)	2–4	(penalty missed) Cahill; (penalty scored) Baines; (penalty scored) Neville; (penalty scored) Vaughan; (penalty scored) Jagielka

Wembley Stadium, London
Attendance: 88,141
Referee: Mike Riley (West Yorkshire)

== Final ==
30 May 2009
15:00 BST

Chelsea	2–1	Everton
Drogba 21'; Lampard 72'	Report	Saha 1'

Wembley Stadium, London
Attendance: 89,391
Referee: Howard Webb (South Yorkshire)

== Top scorers ==
Rank	Player	Club	Goals
1	(France) Nicolas Anelka	Chelsea	4
1	(Netherlands) Robin van Persie	Arsenal	4
3	(Brazil) Afonso Alves	Middlesbrough	3
3	(Germany) Michael Ballack	Chelsea	3
3	(Ivory Coast) Didier Drogba	Chelsea	3
3	(Croatia) Eduardo	Arsenal	3
3	(England) Greg Halford	Sheffield United	3
3	(England) Rob Hulse	Derby County	3
3	(Barbados) Paul Ifill	Crystal Palace	3
3	(England) Andy Johnson	Fulham	3
3	(England) Frank Lampard	Chelsea	3
3	(England) James Milner	Aston Villa	3
3	(Russia) Roman Pavlyuchenko	Tottenham Hotspur	3
3	(Trinidad and Tobago) Jason Scotland	Swansea City	3
3	(Scotland) Steven Thompson	Burnley	3
3	(England) Craig Westcarr	Kettering Town	3

== Media coverage ==
In the United Kingdom, ITV regained the free to air broadcasting rights from the BBC who held on to it after seven seasons while Setanta Sports took over the subscription broadcasting rights from Sky Sports who held on to it for 20 seasons.

The matches shown live on ITV1 (most regions) were:

• Havant & Waterlooville 1-3 Brentford (R1)

• Histon 1-0 Leeds United (R2)

• Preston North End 0-2 Liverpool (R3)

• Gillingham 1-2 Aston Villa (R3)

• Southend United 1-4 Chelsea (R3 Replay)

• Hartlepool United 0-2 West Ham United (R4)

• Manchester United 2-1 Tottenham Hotspur (R4)

• Everton 1-0 Liverpool (R4 Replay)

• Swansea City 1-1 Fulham (R5)

• Derby County 1-4 Manchester United (R5)

• Middlesbrough 2-0 West Ham United (R5 Replay)

• Coventry City 0-2 Chelsea (QF)

• Fulham 0-4 Manchester United (QF)

• Manchester United 0-0 Everton (SF)

• Chelsea 2-1 Everton (Final)

The matches shown live on Setanta Sports were:

• Leeds United 1-1 Northampton Town (R1)

• AFC Wimbledon 1-4 Wycombe Wanderers (R1)

• Tranmere Rovers 1-0 Accrington Stanley (R1 Replay)

• Northampton Town 2-5 Leeds United (R1 Replay)

• Barrow 2-1 Brentford (R2)

• AFC Bournemouth 0-0 Blyth Spartans (R2)

• Kettering Town 2-1 Notts County (R2 Replay)

• Blyth Spartans 1-0 AFC Bournemouth (R2 Replay)

• Tottenham Hotspur 3-1 Wigan Athletic (R3)

• Southampton 0-3 Manchester United (R3)

• Blyth Spartans 0-1 Blackburn Rovers (R3)

• Bristol City 0-2 Portsmouth (R3 Replay)

• Derby County 1-1 Nottingham Forest (R4)

• Cardiff City 0-0 Arsenal (R4)

• Liverpool 1-1 Everton (R4)

• Arsenal 4-0 Cardiff City (R4 Replay)

• Watford 1-3 Chelsea (R5)

• Everton 3-1 Aston Villa (R5)

• Arsenal 3-0 Burnley (R5)

• Hull City 2-1 Sheffield United (R5 Replay)

• Everton 2-1 Middlesbrough (QF)

• Arsenal 2-1 Hull City (QF)

• Arsenal 1-2 Chelsea (SF)

• Chelsea 2-1 Everton (Final)

International broadcasters

Country	Broadcaster
Belgium	Prime
Canada	Setanta Sports
France	France Télévisions
Italy	SKY Italia
