= A Nightingale Sang in Berkeley Square =

1939 popular song

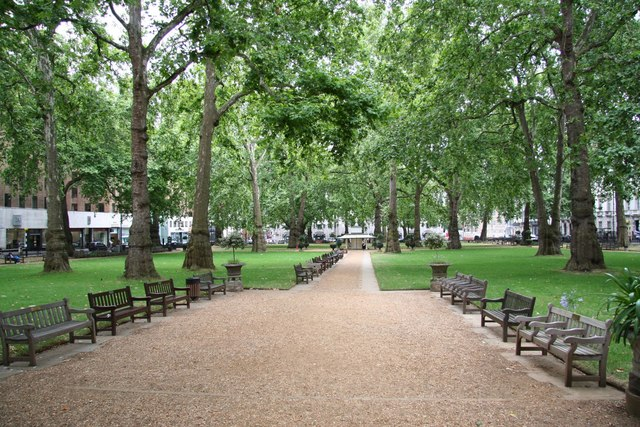
- The gardens of Berkeley Square in London

Song
- Written: 1939
- Published: 1940 by Peter Maurice Music Co.
- Composer: Manning Sherwin
- Lyricist: Eric Maschwitz

"A Nightingale Sang in Berkeley Square" is a British romantic popular song written in 1939 and published in 1940, with lyrics by Eric Maschwitz and music by Manning Sherwin.

== Setting ==
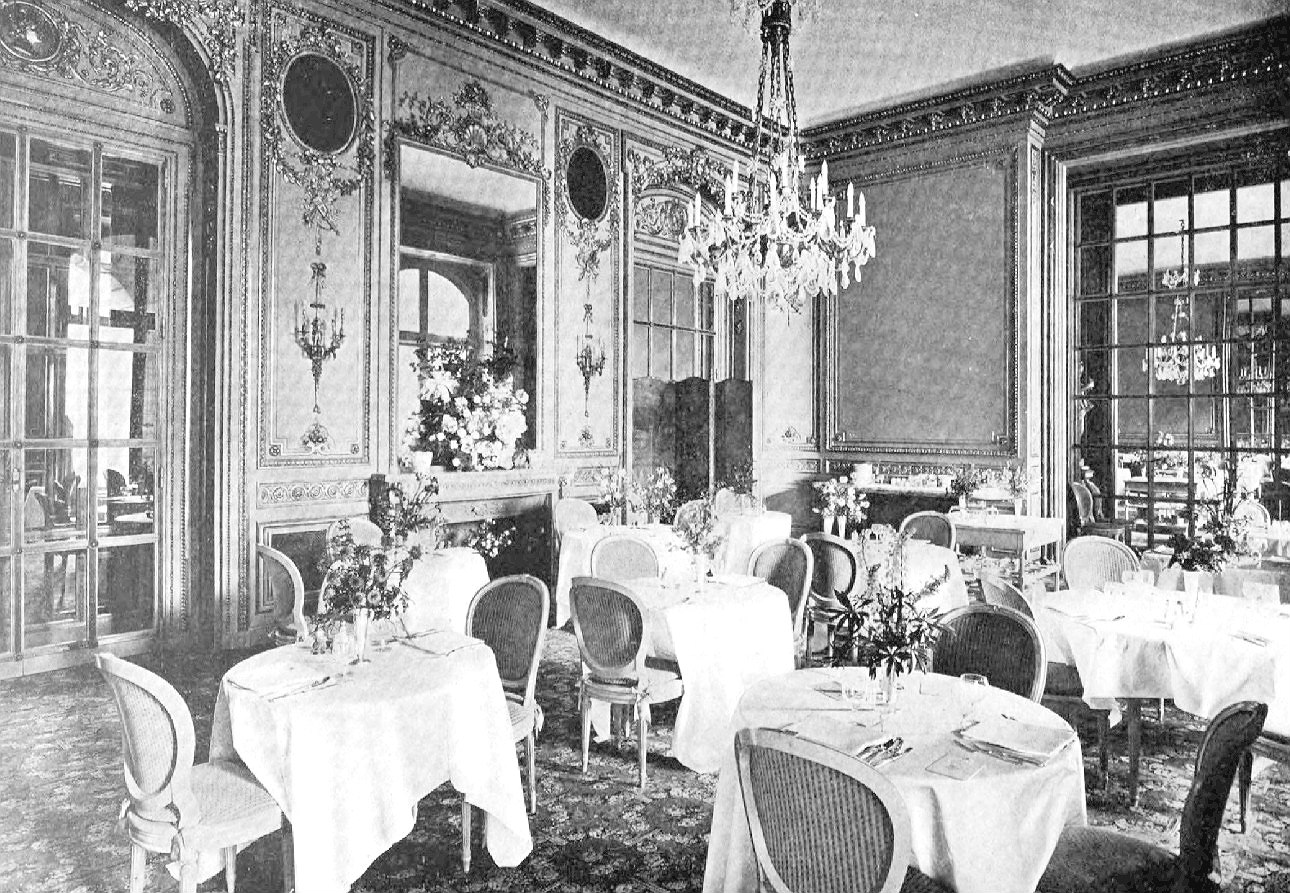
The song makes reference to the nearby luxurious The Ritz Hotel

Berkeley Square is a large leafy square in Mayfair, a part of London. The Ritz Hotel referred to is just outside Mayfair, adjacent to Green Park.

That certain night, the night we met,
There was magic abroad in the air,
There were angels dining at the Ritz
And a nightingale sang in Berkeley Square.

The nightingale, a migrant songbird, is celebrated in literature and music for the beauty of its song. It favours rural habitats, and is unlikely to be heard in Central London.

== Composition ==
The song was written in the then-small French fishing village of Le Lavandou—now a favourite resort for British holidaymakers and second-home owners—shortly before the outbreak of the Second World War. It is typically sung in the key of D-flat major by male vocalists such as Nat King Cole and Frank Sinatra.

"When the Nightingale Sang in Berkeley Square" is the title of a short story by Michael Arlen, published in 1923 as part of his collection These Charming People. According to Maschwitz, the title of the song was "stolen" from that of the story. The song had its first performance in the summer of 1939 in a local bar, where the melody was played on piano by Manning Sherwin with the help of the resident saxophonist. Maschwitz sang the words while holding a glass of wine, but nobody seemed impressed. In the spring of 2002, an attempt was made to find the bar where this song was first performed: it was hoped that a blue plaque could be set up. With the help of the local tourist office, elderly residents were questioned, but it proved impossible to identify the venue.

The verse and the additional lyrics to a second chorus were in the song as written, but are rarely sung in recordings (those of Bobby Darin, Mel Torme, Blossom Dearie, Twiggy, Vera Lynn and Rod Stewart being notable exceptions). Twiggy's version was featured in an episode ("Fran's Gotta Have It") of The Nanny.

The song was published in 1940, when it was first performed in the London revue New Faces by Judy Campbell (later the mother of Jane Birkin). In the same year it was also performed by both Ray Noble and then by Vera Lynn. The tune is a recurring theme in the Fritz Lang film Man Hunt (1941). It was notably sung by Elsie Carlisle, an English female singer active both before and during the British dance band era.

== Recordings and performances ==
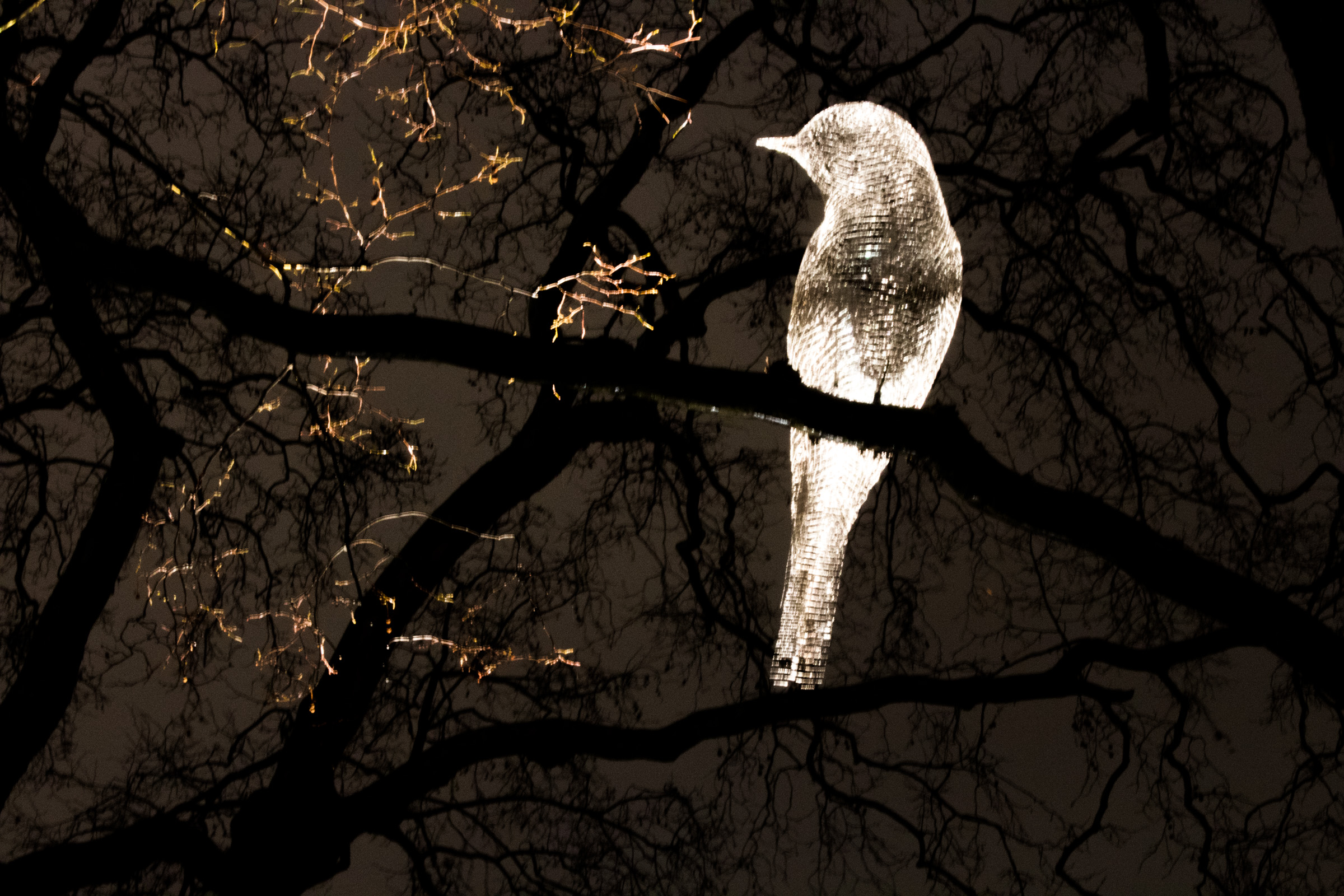
An illuminated wire sculpture of a nightingale, displayed in London's Berkeley Square as part of Lumiere London 2018, an art festival. The sculpture and the accompanying soundtrack A Nightingale Sang in Berkeley Square formed an art installation titled 'Was that a dream?' by a French artist Cédric Le Borgne.

Early chart hits of the song in the US were by Glenn Miller, Ray Noble, Guy Lombardo and Sammy Kaye. The Glenn Miller recording (Bluebird 10931) with a Ray Eberle vocal was made in New York City on 11 October 1940. The fluttering clarinet that opens the track and no doubt is meant to suggest the sound of the nightingale began, it seems, with the Miller recording. The opening, using either a clarinet or flute, has been picked up by others including the Frank Sinatra recording. The record was first charted on 21 December 1940, peaking at No. 2.

The song has since become a standard, being recorded by Bing Crosby (recorded 20 December 1940), Frank Sinatra in London in June 1962, and Rod Stewart on the 2004 album Stardust: the Great American Songbook 3. It also appears on Vera Lynn's album 16 Most Requested Songs. Anita O'Day performed it on her 1956 album Anita, re-released in 1962 (V/V6-8483) as This is Anita; the song became part of the jazz singer's repertoire. Nat King Cole sang it on the 1961 album The Touch of Your Lips, Carmen McRae, Perry Como on his 1977 The Best of British album, Stephane Grappelli, Bobby Darin on the 1962 album Oh! Look at Me Now, British comedian Richard Digance in 1979 on both single and LP, Harry Connick Jr. on the 1990 album We Are in Love, The Brian Setzer Orchestra on their eponymous 1994 album, and Sonny Rollins on the 2000 album This Is What I Do. The folk singer and accordionist John Kirkpatrick (musician) included the song on his album Three in a Row released in 1983. A version by The Manhattan Transfer won a Grammy Award for Best Vocal Arrangement for Two or More Voices in 1982 for its arranger, Gene Puerling. A version was featured in an early Tom Hanks movie titled Everytime We Say Goodbye released in 1986. The British group the New Vaudeville Band wrote a highly distinctive version in 1966. The veteran British musician Ian Hunter, former vocalist for Mott the Hoople, regularly performs it in his concerts; and it has appeared on two at least of his live recordings. A performance of the song by British actor Robert Lindsay was used as the theme to the British situation comedy series Nightingales. Faryl Smith released a cover of the song on her debut album Faryl in 2009. The song was also sung in the episode "Captain Jack Harkness" on Torchwood. Lyrics from the song were also paraphrased in the 1990 novel Good Omens by Neil Gaiman and Terry Pratchett (the story features an angel and a demon having lunch together at the Ritz, for example), and Tori Amos recorded the song for the 2019 television adaptation. The song is referenced again in season two when Crowley tells Aziraphale there are "no nightingales" during their fight and separation at the end of the season. The lyrics are spoken and sung by the actor John Le Mesurier on the album What Is Going to Become of Us All?

On 10 July 2005 there was a national celebration of the 60th anniversary of the ending of World War II when the song was sung live to millions by Petula Clark in central London to an audience of veterans and politicians as part of the programme V45 Britain At War: A Nation Remembers.

On 9 May 2015 Katherine Jenkins sang the song at VE Day 70: A Party to Remember at Horse Guards Parade in London. In 2015, British comedian and TV host Alexander Armstrong performed it on his first album, A Year of Songs. On a 2015 bonus episode of the podcast My Brother, My Brother and Me ("The McElroy Family Fun Hour Brought to You by Totino's"), co-host Justin McElroy sang a parody entitled "A Pizza Roll Sang in Berkeley Square."

Also in 2019, the song was performed in an episode of The Marvelous Mrs. Maisel by Darius de Haas.

The song features on Michael Bublé's 2022 album Higher.
