= Wonderland (Faryl Smith album) =

Studio album by Faryl Smith
- Released: 30 November 2009
- Recorded: Sarm Studios, Notting Hill, London
- Genre: Classical crossover
- Length: 51:57
- Label: Decca
- Producer: Jon Cohen

Faryl Smith chronology
Faryl (2009)	Wonderland (2009)

Wonderland is the second studio album by teenage mezzo-soprano Faryl Smith, released by Decca Records on 30 November 2009. Smith became famous after her participation in Britain's Got Talent in 2008, and subsequently, aged 13, signed with Universal Classics and Jazz, releasing her debut album, Faryl. Released only a few months afterwards, Wonderland contains a mix of classical and non-classical songs, which were chosen by both Smith and her record label. A concept album, it is based on Alice in Wonderland, and features a digitally produced "duet" with Luciano Pavarotti, who died in 2007, as well as a song set to "Winter", from Vivaldi's Four Seasons. As with Faryl, Wonderland was produced by Jon Cohen.

Smith promoted the album with appearances on television and radio. For the most part, critics responded positively to the album, with praise for Smith's vocals, the song choice and the musical arrangement, but criticism for "the lack of emotional weight". Further, critics observed that Smith's voice had improved since her appearance on Britain's Got Talent. Despite this, Wonderland appeared in the UK Albums Chart for only one week, peaking at 54, proving less successful than Faryl. Smith later rerecorded "The Prayer", her cover of which was originally released on Wonderland, with 22 other classical artists, with proceeds going to charity.

== Background ==
Smith, aged 13 at the time, signed a record-breaking multi-album deal with Universal Classics and Jazz in December 2008, six months after finishing outside the top three in the Britain's Got Talent series two final. Her debut album, Faryl, was released in March 2009. Smith later described the album as "an introduction to me and an introduction for me to recording", and said that she "wanted to follow up [Faryl] as quickly as possible with another record, something richer and varied". In July, it was announced that work had begun on her second album, with hopes to release it later in the year. Smith said in an interview that "We're starting to look at what songs will be on the second album ... I'm not really choosing the songs myself, I'm leaving that up to the people at the record label. I'm really happy that they want me to do another album so soon – I didn't think I would be working on one so quickly after the first one was released ... I'm just excited to get under way with it."

== Recording and release ==
External videos
- "Somewhere Far Away (Merry Xmas Mr. Lawrence)" promotional video on YouTube

Wonderland was revealed as the album's name in September, and a preliminary release date of 30 November was forwarded. Recording took place at Sarm Studios in Notting Hill, London, and completed in early October. Smith recorded her vocals during her school holidays. Initially, Smith was asked by her label for a track listing, but said that she "didn't know what songs would be wrong or right for an album". Instead, she and Decca both created their own lists, and the final track list was compiled from the two. The result included a variety of songs; Smith said she was pleased with the mix, citing "classical numbers" like "The Prayer", in contrast to "a more unexpected song", "Close to You". The track "O Holy Night" features a "duet" with Luciano Pavarotti, who died in 2007; Pavarotti's vocals were digitally added to Smith's recording to produce the song. The title track, "Wonderland", is set to "Winter", from Vivaldi's Four Seasons, and the lead track, "Merry Christmas Mr Lawrence (Somewhere Far Away)" is an adaptation of a piece by Ryuichi Sakamoto, originally from Merry Christmas, Mr. Lawrence. Smith's favourite tracks on the album are "O Holy Night" and "The Prayer".

The album was produced by Jon Cohen, who also produced Faryl and has previously worked with artists including the Opera Babes and Vanessa-Mae. Cohen said that Smith has "matured as an artist since the first album" and that he had "no doubt that once again, people will be astonished and moved by her performances". Smith's father, Tony, said that the bosses at universal were hoping for the album to be more commercially successful than Faryl, but noted that the market around Christmas time is tough, due to the high volume of releases. Brian Roberts, writing for the Daily Mirror, claimed that Wonderland was "tipped to go head to head" for the number one classical album position with releases from Il Divo and Rhydian Roberts.

Wonderland is a concept album loosely based on Lewis Carroll's Alice in Wonderland. The album took the title from the book, and was created with the intention of taking listeners on a journey, as well as showcasing Smith's voice. She said that "that's something I like to hear in music. Whether I listen to Beyonce [sic] or Vivaldi, music is supposed to transport you away, escape from the everyday." Smith said that she sometimes felt like Alice chasing White Rabbit, and, for this reason, "Wonderland" was a suitable title track for the album.

== Promotion ==
Wonderland was released for the Christmas market, and was labelled as a potential Christmas number one. Smith embarked on a promotional tour, beginning at the end of October, with magazine, television and radio appearances. Appearances included Ready Steady Cook, Blue Peter, the BBC News Channel, Sky News Sunrise, The Alan Titchmarsh Show and The Paul O'Grady Show. Speaking about the album's promotion, Smith said "[i]t is always a struggle when a second album comes out because you never know how it is going to do but fingers crossed people will enjoy it. I am very proud of it. ... I am excited about going on all the shows too – especially Ready Steady Cook because I can't cook and I think it will be fun."

== Reception and performance ==
Professional ratings
Review scores
Source	Rating
Daily Express	4/5 stars
The Sun	Positive
The Independent	3/5 stars

Critics responded positively to the album. Paul Callan, reviewing the album for the Daily Express, described Wonderland as "a joy"; he compared it to other Christmas albums, saying that "[t]oo many are tired, much-repeated carol selections." He described Smith's "control, tone and warmth" as "very moving". Overall, he gave the album 4 out of 5. A reviewer writing for The Sun described the album as a "lush collection" of songs, and said that Smith's "voice is now stronger, richer and even more musical". Andy Gill, reviewing Wonderland for The Independent, gave a more mixed review. He said that the influence of Alice in Wonderland was often hard to perceive, and said that Cohen and Smith had "sweetened the classical elements". He praised the arrangements of "Adiemus", "Barcarolle", "Merry Christmas, Mr Lawrence" and "Blow the Wind Southerly", but noted that "on "Close to You" and other tracks, "the lack of emotional weight is telling." Overall, Gill gave Wonderland 3 out of 5.

Local paper the Northamptonshire Evening Telegraph reported that Wonderland was selling well; on Amazon.co.uk's charts, it appeared at number one on the symphonies chart, 13 on easy listening and 95 overall. A spokesman for the local HMV store was quoted as saying "Sales of the new Faryl album have got off to a storming start – she is proving hugely popular at HMV. ... We're actually selling as many copies of Faryl's new album as we are Susan Boyle right now." However, the album entered the top 75 of the UK Albums Chart for only one week, peaking at 54. It appeared on the Arts & Book Review (Independent Print) classical albums chart for two weeks, peaking at number 6. The album proved less successful than Smith's debut, and, subsequent to its release, Smith's contract with Universal ended.

Having originally released her version of "The Prayer" on Wonderland, Smith and 22 other classical musicians from the UK recorded a version of the song for charity in the aftermath of the 2010 Haiti earthquake. The proceeds of the single, which was released on 14 March 2010, went to the Disasters Emergency Committee. Smith said "It's a real honour to be a part of something that is being done for the first time, and I hope that all music lovers get involved and help raise money for the campaign. I really hope that we can make a difference together to help the horrible situation that Haiti is in at the moment." The group, dubbed "Classical Band Aid", recorded the track at Metropolis Studios and were backed by the Royal Philharmonic Orchestra. Each vocalist in the group performed their own solo lines, and the entire group came together for the finale.

== Credits ==
=== Music ===
- Dirk Campbell - Quena and uilleann pipes
- Jon Cohen - Bass, guitar, keyboards and piano
- Charlie Kenny - Drums
- Tom Lewis - Flugelhorn
- Cliff Masterson - Keyboards and trumpet
- Helen Skelton - Vocals
- Mark Read - Vocals

=== Administration and production ===
- Ed Bainton - Assistance
- Stephen Baker - Choir arrangement
- Matt Bartram - Assistance
- Kara Bassett - Product management
- Sylvia Berryman - Vocal coaching
- Marco Canepa - Vocal coaching
- Paul Chessell - Design
- Jon Cohen - Arrangement, mixing, production and programming
- Phil Da Costa - Mixing and programming
- Phillip Doghan - Vocal coaching
- Sandrine Dulermo - Photography
- Olga Fitzroy - Assistance
- Andy Hughes - Assistance
- Michael Labica - Photography
- Darren Lawson - Assistance
- Tom Lewis - Artists and repertoire
- Steve Lowe - Engineering
- Cliff Masterson - Arrangement, choir arrangement, conducting, orchestration and programming
- Steve Price - Engineering
- Ronan Phelan - Assistance
- Maureen Scott - Vocal coaching
- David Temple - Conducting
- Al Unsworth - Engineering

== Track listing ==
No.	Title	Writer(s)	Length
1.	"Merry Christmas Mr Lawrence (Somewhere Far Away)"	Sakamoto Ryuichi	4:28
2.	"O Holy Night"	Placide Cappeau, Adolphe Adam, John Sullivan Dwight	5:09
3.	"Wonderland"	Frank Musker, Antonio Vivaldi	3:45
4.	"The Prayer"	David W. Foster, Carole Bayer Sager	4:26
5.	"Adiemus"	Karl Jenkins, Michael Roland Ratledge	3:56
6.	"Barcarolle"	Jacques Offenbach	3:41
7.	"In Dulce Jubilo"	(traditional)	3:55
8.	"Night of Silence"	Norell Oson Bard (Ola Håkansson, Alexander Bard, Tim Norell)	2:58
9.	"Evening Prayer"	Engelbert Humperdinck	4:07
10.	"Blow the Wind Southerly"	(traditional)	3:36
11.	"Hymn to the Moon"	Brendan Graham, Antonín Dvořák	4:48
12.	"Close to You"	Hal David, Burt Bacharach	3:47
13.	"How Can I Keep from Singing?"	Robert Lowry, Ira D. Sankey	3:21

== Charts ==
Chart	Peak position
UK Albums Chart	56
