= Kate and Gin =

Musical canine freestyle act

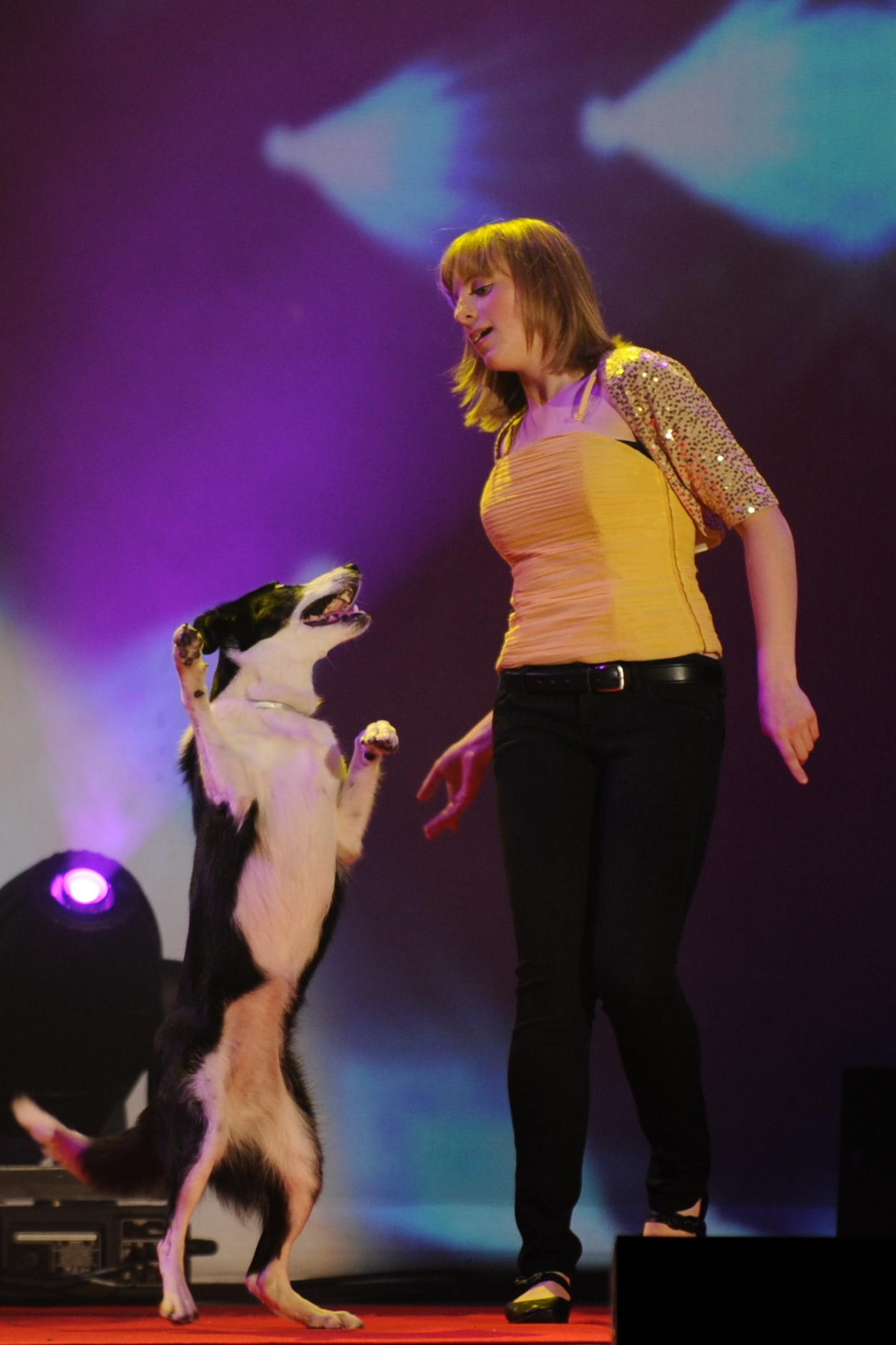
- Kate & Gin Performing on the Britains Got Talent Tour 2008
- Born: Kate Nicholas; 1991 (age 34–35); Gin; 2001; Norbury, Cheshire, England
- Education: Reaseheath College, Nantwich, Cheshire
- Occupation: Dog trainer
- Years active: 2008-present

Kate and Gin are a musical canine freestyle act consisting of Kate Nicholas, from Norbury, Cheshire and her dancing Border Collie, Gin. The two achieved fame following their 2008 appearances on the second series of ITV talent show Britain's Got Talent. Since the show, the duo have appeared publicly and in pantomimes, as well as publishing a book, Kate and Gin, about dog training. In 2011, Nicholas joined the Royal Army Veterinary Corps, training dogs for the British military.

== Britain's Got Talent ==
Kate and Gin first appeared on the second series of Britain's Got Talent on 12 April 2008 where they performed to Moby's remake of the James Bond theme tune, received "three yeses" by the judges (Simon Cowell, Amanda Holden and Piers Morgan) and were sent through to the semi-finals. Before the live shows, Cowell described the duo as the favourite to win. In the live semi-final, broadcast on 26 May 2008, Kate and Gin were again successful, performing a different routine to The Scissor Sisters' "I Don't Feel Like Dancin'" and finishing second behind dance group Signature. They again performed a routine to Moby's "James Bond Theme" in the show's final on 31 May 2008, but failed to make the final three finishing in eighth place overall. The competition was eventually won by George Sampson. After the final, the duo performed with others from the show in the Britain's Got Talent Live Tour, again performing a routine to the Scissor Sisters' "I Don't Feel Like Dancin'".

== After the show ==
Hoping for a career in film, Kate and Gin signed with an agent after Britain's Got Talent. They received many offers to perform at events and entered into talks about appearing on television adverts, including offers from Carlsberg for a "best kennel in the world" advertising campaign. This led to appearances around England and in Wales. These have included public shows and sponsored events. On 6 October 2008, a book about the pair, entitled Kate and Gin, was released by HarperCollins. Nicholas described the book as "about me and Gin growing up together and how to train dogs like I've trained Gin. It explains how to create a special bond with a dog."

Television appearances after the book deal included on Alan Carr's Celebrity Ding Dong and Gordon Ramsay: Cookalong Live, alongside Amanda Holden. Nicholas also gave up her course in animal management to instead focus on a career in pantomime. They both appeared in a performance of Peter Pan at the Theatre Royal, Windsor and Nicholas is training a new dog, Ice. Kate, Gin and Ice appeared on the Trisha show 26 May 2009, where Kate said that she wants to open a school for training animals to appear in films and other events.

In 2011, after several years of pantomime and other performances, Nicholas joined the Royal Army Veterinary Corps in the puppy development section, based at the Defence Animal Centre and doing an operational tour as a Military working dog handler in Afghanistan. Nicholas trains all dogs, using the same techniques she used with Gin, saying "you go down the same route, you use the same positive reinforcement techniques, lots of praise, lots of toys". She said that she "joined the Army because [she] wanted to use [her] skills in a practical sense, rather than performing up and down the country". Gin retired from performing to live in the family home, but has handed over the reins to Border Collie Ice.
