= Faryl Smith =

British soprano (born 1995)

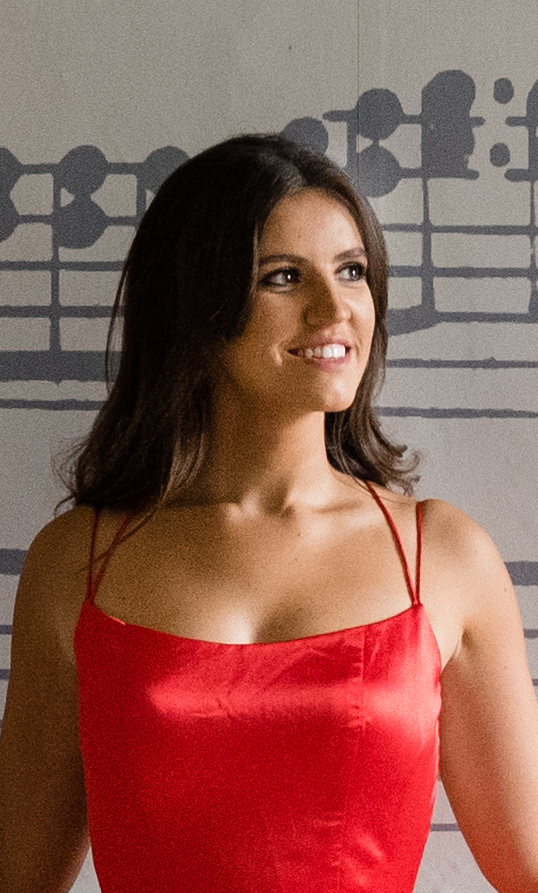
- Smith, 2020

Background information
- Born: 23 July 1995 (age 31)
- Origin: Kettering, Northamptonshire, England
- Genres: Classical crossover
- Occupation: Singer
- Instrument: Vocals
- Years active: 2008–present
- Label: Formerly Universal Classics and Jazz
- Website: farylmusic.com

Faryl Smith (born 23 July 1995) is a British soprano who performs opera, classical and classical crossover music. Smith rose to fame after appearing on the second series of the ITV television talent show Britain's Got Talent in 2008 as a child finishing in fifth place in The Final. After the programme, in December 2008, Smith signed a contract with Universal Classics and Jazz for a £2.3 million advance, the largest ever granted to a schoolgirl. Her debut album, Faryl, was recorded from December 2008 to January 2009 and released in March 2009. Faryl became the fastest-selling solo classical album in British chart history, selling 29,200 copies in the first week. It debuted at number six and rose to number four the following week, making Smith the third Britain's Got Talent contestant to have a top ten album. In 2010, on account of Faryl, Smith was nominated for two Classical BRIT Awards and became the youngest artist ever to receive a double nomination.

Smith's second album, Wonderland, was released in November 2009, after which Smith left Universal. In addition to releasing her two albums, she featured on a charity cover of "The Prayer", released in March 2010, provided vocals for the 2012 album The Magic of a Thousand Strings by the International Harp Ensemble, and performed at numerous public events, including the 2009 Royal Variety Performance. In 2015, Smith began studying music at the Guildhall School of Music and Drama in London. She continued to perform regularly, including at major sporting events, such as a Six Nations match at Twickenham Stadium in February 2019.

== Early life ==
Smith was born in Kettering, Northamptonshire, England, on 23 July 1995. She was a student at Southfield School for Girls. where she completed her GCSEs in 2011, and she studied for her A levels, with the intention of going to university afterwards. In 2015, aged 20, she started to study music at the Guildhall School of Music and Drama in London.

== Career ==
=== Britain's Got Talent ===
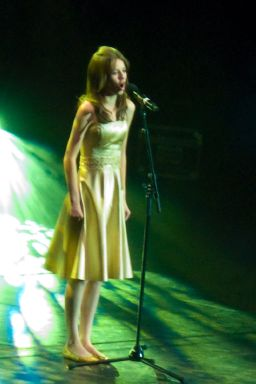
Smith performing during the Britain's Got Talent.

Before her appearance on television, Smith had performed competitively severa times, including in the Kettering & District Eisteddfod and the Llangollen International Musical Eisteddfod. She auditioned for the second series of the ITV reality television programme Britain's Got Talent, giving what Jon O'Brien, of Allmusic, called a "mature" performance of "Ave Maria", and was put through to the live shows. Simon Cowell described her audition as "the best audition [he had] heard in years". Before performing live, she and Andrew Johnston were favourites to win. She won her semi-final by the public vote, performing a cover of Sarah McLachlan's "Angel". This placed her in the final, and left her as the favourite to win. During her first live show, Cowell described her as "literally one in a million". She then performed in the live final. She again performed "Ave Maria", but finished outside the top three. Sampson eventually won the show as a result of the phone-in, with Signature second, and Johnston third. As a result of her final performance of "Ave Maria", Smith was invited to be a guest singer at a songwriting awards ceremony in London. She then went on to perform in the Britain's Got Talent Live Tour with other contestants, where she first performed a duet of "Walking in the Air" with Johnston.

While Smith was competing in Britain's Got Talent, Cowell arranged for her to receive singing lessons from the leading vocal coach Yvie Burnett, who had previously coached Paul Potts, an earlier winner of Britain's Got Talent, as well as Leona Lewis, a winner of The X Factor. The story was broken by The Sunday Mirror; writing for the paper, Lara Gould characterised the lessons as "secret". During her participation in the competition, Smith was offered record deals, but she and her family turned them down. Her father, Tony Smith, said "We have had offers from people interested in Faryl. But when Simon Cowell ... says your daughter is special, you listen." Cowell described Smith's potential career during the show, saying "I know she says Katherine [Jenkins] is her idol but she is far better than her. She is by far the most talented youngster I've ever heard. When she opens her mouth her voice is just incredible."

=== Record deal ===
The day after the Britain's Got Talent finals, Max Clifford, speaking for Simon Cowell, said that it was "quite possible" that Cowell would be signing some of the finalists, including Smith. Though she did not sign with Syco, Cowell's record label, she did record a duet of "Walking in the Air" with Johnston, which appeared on his debut album, One Voice. Before the release of One Voice, it was revealed that Smith and her father were finalising the details of her record deal.

In December 2008, Smith had signed a £2.3 million, multi-album deal with Universal Music Group. Universal claimed it intended to market Smith as a pop star. Neil Fisher, writing for The Times, described Smith as "heir apparent" to Jenkins; the pair had first met when Smith won a competition at the Llangollen International Musical Eisteddfod. By 2009, Jenkins was acting as a mentor to Smith.

In January 2009 plans were released for Smith to perform with Plácido Domingo, an idea originally suggested by him. In an interview with the Metro, Smith talked about her future plans, insisting that she did not wish to be dubbed as the next Charlotte Church. She has also spoken of her desire to appear in films on top of her musical career. She said "Films and movies are something I'd really like to do. I've always wanted to act, so doing a film would be amazing."

=== Faryl ===
Smith's first album, Faryl, was recorded at Air Studios, London, in December 2008, during Smith's Christmas holiday; it was completed on 3 January 2009 and features a 60-piece orchestra. Smith said that her favourite song on the album was her version of the Welsh hymn "Calon Lân". Other songs include Smith's version of "Amazing Grace", a cover of John Denver's "Annie's Song", and a version of "The Way Old Friends Do", rewritten for Smith by Björn Ulvaeus. Smith described the song by saying that "[i]t was about divorce ... They didn't think it was appropriate for me to sing about that, so Björn changed the lyrics so it's about friendship." The album was produced by Jon Cohen, who had previously worked with artists including the Operababes and Vanessa Mae.

Promotion began in January, with performances at the Mandarin Oriental Hotel and appearances at the debut of 2009 London revival of Oliver!. A television advert and music video for "River of Light" were recorded to further publicise the release, and Smith appeared on the cover of April's Classic FM Magazine. More promotional appearances in the weeks leading up to the release of Faryl included Loose Women, The Paul O'Grady Show, BBC Radio 4, BBC Radio 5 Live and BBC Breakfast. She also appeared at the Children's Champion Awards and met Gordon Brown at 10 Downing Street. On the day of the release, there was an album signing in Smith's hometown of Kettering, at the HMV branch. Smith said "I definitely want to be at home for the launch. I want to be surrounded by my friends and family because obviously, it's a big deal for me."

Pete Paphides, writing for The Times, said that the songs were performed "with power and restraint" and that the "arrangements by Jon Cohen suggest some kind of aesthetic endeavour beyond the basic thing for which they exist". He compared it favourably to three other Mothering Sunday releases: Lionel Richie's Just Go, Ronan Keating's Songs for My Mother, and Barry Manilow's The Greatest Songs of the Eighties. He awarded Faryl 3 out of a possible 5, the highest rating of the four. On the day of the release the album was at the number one spot on the UK Albums Chart, based on presales alone. The album became the fastest-selling classical solo album in British history, selling 20,000 copies in the first four days. The previous record holder had been Hayley Westenra's Pure. The first week resulted in sales of 29,200 copies, which is higher than any other debut album of a classical singer. Faryl officially entered the charts at number six and rose to fourth place the next week. The success of the album left Smith the third Britain's Got Talent contestant to achieve a top ten album, after Potts (with One Chance) and Johnston (with One Voice).

In April 2009, Smith travelled to Los Angeles to begin her promotion of Faryl in the United States. She appeared on The Ellen DeGeneres Show in early May as part of her promotional tour. Faryl was released in the US on 5 May. Smith said before the release that she did not expect it to sell as well as it did in the UK. She said that "in the US it's a lot harder because I'm not as well-known". Smith travelled back to the UK in early May, and, on 23 May, Faryl peaked at 31st place on Top Heatseekers Albums chart and at sixth place on the Classical Albums chart, remaining in the charts for one and 17 weeks respectively. Smith opened the 2009 Classical BRIT Awards, where, according to Elisa Roche of the Daily Express, she "captivated the best names in classical music". On 30 May, Smith became the youngest person to sing the British national anthem, "God Save The Queen", at an FA Cup final when she performed during the opening ceremony at the 2009 final, held in the Wembley Stadium. In June, Smith performed a duet with José Carreras at the Hampton Court Palace Festival, and in July, she attended the O2 Silver Clef Awards, winning the Classical Award.

In February 2010, after the release of Smith's second album, Faryl was nominated for a Classical BRIT Award in the album category. The category is voted for by the public, and the shortlist comprises the ten best-selling classical albums of the previous year. Faryl lost to Only Men Aloud's Band of Brothers. Smith also lost in the young British classical performer category to Jack Liebeck, a violinist. Smith became the youngest artist ever to receive a double nomination. In November, Smith was awarded the best classical award at the 2009 Variety Club awards, the youngest recipient in the awards' history.

=== Wonderland ===
In July 2009, it was announced that Smith was hoping to release her second album later in the year. In an interview, she expressed surprise and pleasure that the label wanted her to record another album so soon after the first. In September, further details about the album were released, including its name, Wonderland, and planned release date, 30 November. Smith claimed that Faryl "was an introduction to me and an introduction for me to recording", while Cohen, producer of both Faryl and Wonderland, said Smith had "matured as an artist since the first album and I have no doubt that once again, people will be astonished and moved by her performances". The album, which was recorded at Sarm Studios in Notting Hill, London, was completed in early October, and is loosely based on Lewis Carroll's Alice's Adventures in Wonderland. Wonderland was released on 30 November. To publicise the album, Smith appeared on numerous radio shows, as well as making television appearances including on Ready Steady Cook, Blue Peter, the BBC News Channel, The Alan Titchmarsh Show and Sky News Sunrise.

Paul Callan, reviewing the album for the Daily Express, described it as "a joy". He compared it to other Christmas albums, saying that "[t]oo many are tired, much-repeated carol selections". He described Smith's "control, tone and warmth" as "very moving". Andy Gill, reviewing Wonderland for The Independent, gave a less positive review. He said that the influence of Alice's Adventures in Wonderland was often hard to perceive and that Cohen and Smith had "sweetened the classical elements". However, he praised the arrangements of "Adiemus", "Barcarolle", "Merry Christmas, Mr Lawrence" and "Blow The Wind Southerly", but noted that on tracks including "Close To You", "the lack of emotional weight is telling". Overall, Gill gave Wonderland 3 out of 5. The album failed to perform as well as Faryl; it entered the British album charts at number 56 for the week ending 12 December before dropping to number 92 the following week and then out of the top 100. After Wonderland, Smith's contract with Universal ended. Smith described the break with the label as mainly her decision, as she needed to focus on her A Levels, which would allow her to get to university, explaining in an interview that "It wasn't like it ended horribly."

Smith performed at the 2009 Royal Variety Performance in front of Queen Elizabeth II, where she sang "God Save the Queen" with the Soldiers. She later said that the experience, including subsequently meeting the Queen, was the highlight of her year. Smith also performed elsewhere with the Soldiers, including at St Paul's Cathedral and Great Ormond Street Children's Hospital.

=== After Universal ===
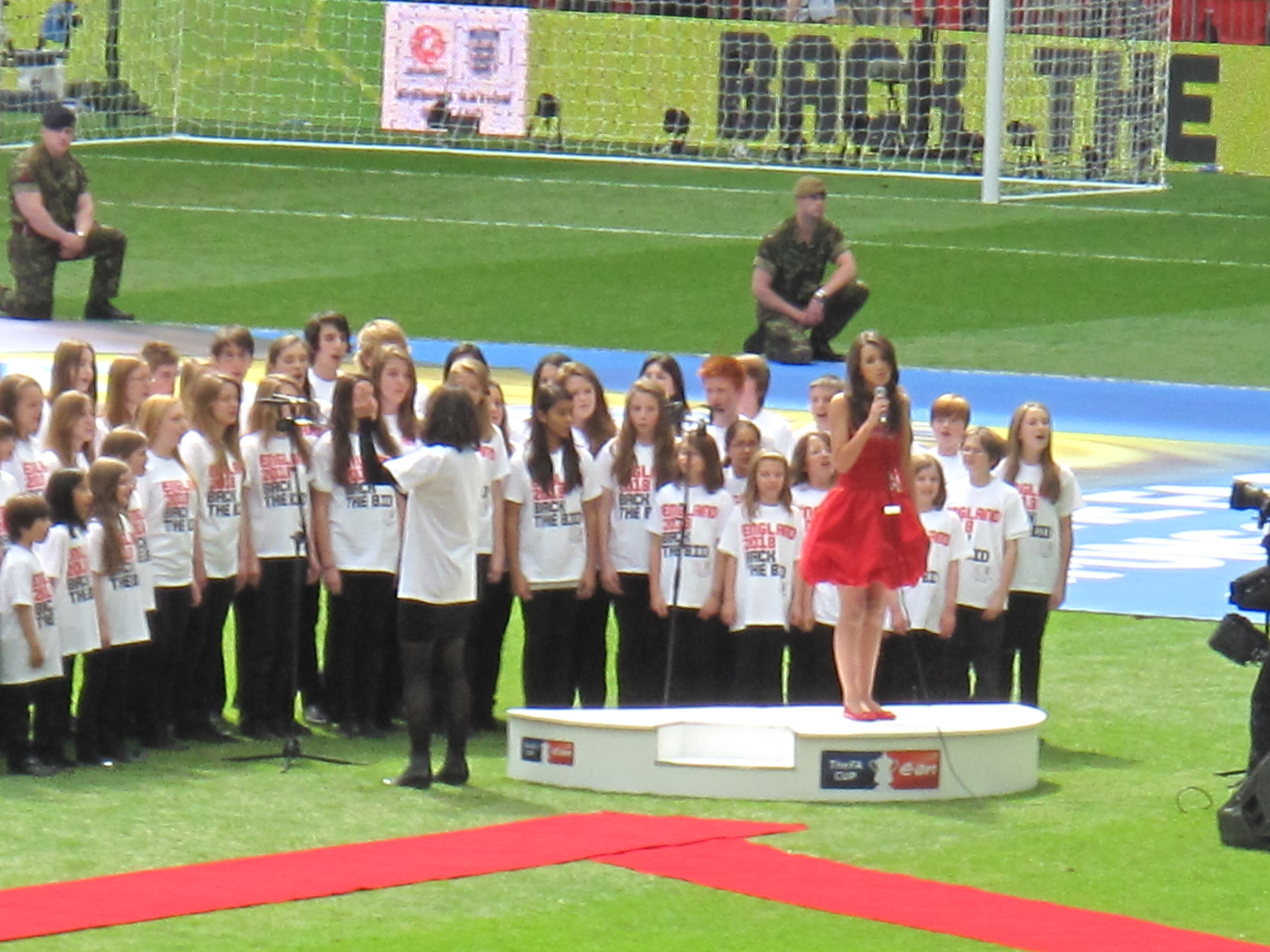
Smith performing "God Save the Queen" at the 2010 FA Cup Final

In the aftermath of the 2010 Haiti earthquake, Smith and 22 other classical musicians from the UK recorded a cover version of "The Prayer", which was released for download on 14 March. The proceeds of the single went to the Disasters Emergency Committee. Smith said "It's a real honour to be a part of something that is being done for the first time, and I hope that all music lovers get involved and help raise money for the campaign. I really hope that we can make a difference together to help the horrible situation that Haiti is in at the moment." The group, dubbed "Classical Band Aid", recorded the track at Metropolis Studios and were backed by the Royal Philharmonic Orchestra. Each vocalist in the group performed their own solo lines, and the entire group came together for the finale.

In mid-2010, Smith performed at various festivals and events. Her father stated that "because she is still so young, we don't want her doing complete shows on her own and we don't want her doing too much". Appearances included the Mercedes-Benz World Summer Concert in Weybridge on 4 July, That Glorious Noise charity concert against muscular dystrophy in Cleethorpes on 17 July, and the Last Night of the Kenwood Proms on 21 August, as well as the wedding of Eamonn Holmes and Ruth Langsford. Smith also opened the Serenata festival. Angela Young, reviewing the festival for the Bournemouth Daily Echo, said "Faryl Smith was my personal highlight of the Thursday night line-up, her bizarrely powerful voice (considering her diminutive size and age) taking my breath away and it contrasted so well with her naivete as she said 'at least it's not raining' – just as the heavens opened."

In October, Smith performed for the first time in Ireland, at the National Concert Hall, Dublin. She continued to perform publicly throughout 2011. In May, she performed at a Help for Heroes charity concert, which raised £2,000, and in both June and October, she performed at concerts to celebrate the 90th year of the Royal British Legion. She again appeared at the Llangollen International Musical Eisteddfod in July, where she sang with Russell Watson. Smith's father described the appearance as "like a homecoming", due to her previous appearance at the competition. In further charitable events later in the year, she raised £2,700 for a hospice in Cransley, and performed in aid of the Salvation Army in Portsmouth. During the Christmas period, Smith performed for the Great Ormond Street Hospital Children's Charity in their annual Christmas carol concert, and at the North Wales Choral Festival at Llandudno. She also appeared as a guest on Rhydian Roberts's talent show on S4C in December. In 2012, she performed with the Mousehole Male Voice Choir in Penzance, and in 2013, she continued to perform locally in Kettering.

From 2012–13, Smith performed several times with the International Harp Ensemble, a Surrey-based group of harpists who produce a variety of different styles of harp music, including appearing with the group on a September episode of Songs of Praise. She also guest-featured on the group's 2012 album The Magic of a Thousand Strings, singing on five tracks. Further shows with the International Harp Ensemble were planned into 2014. While working with the International Harp Ensemble, Smith began training with vocal coach Joy Mammen, who also teaches Lesley Garrett, as well as learning German and Italian, with the intention of moving from classical crossover towards opera.

Smith continued to perform publicly in the late 2010s, appearing at assorted sporting, charitable, and other events. as well as being a contestant on a 2017 episode of Pointless Celebrities. Sporting events at which Smith performed included the FA Community Shield match in 2015 at Wembley, the Checkatrade Trophy at Wembley in 2018, and a Six Nations match at Twickenham in 2019.

== Discography ==
=== Studio albums ===
Year	Album	Peak chart positions			Sales
Year	Album	UK	US Heat	US Classical	Sales
2009	Faryl: Debut album; Released: 9 March 2009; Labels: Universal Classics and Jazz	4	31	6	UK: 150,000+
2009	Wonderland: Second studio album; Released: 30 November 2009; Labels: Universal Classics and Jazz	56	–	–	
