= Yvie Burnett =

Scottish mezzo-soprano and vocal coach

Yvie Burnett (born 8 August 1963), is a Scottish mezzo-soprano and vocal coach, best known for her work with Simon Cowell on television shows The X Factor and Britain's Got Talent, The Big Reunion, The Voice UK and BBC's Let It Shine. She also presented her own TV series for BBC Scotland called, Scotland Sings.

== Education ==
Burnett attended Ellon Academy, Aberdeenshire, the Royal Scottish Academy of Music & Drama, Guildhall School of Music & Drama and The National Opera Studio.

== Singing career ==
Burnett trained as an operatic mezzo-soprano, and performed as a soloist with the Welsh National Opera, Glyndebourne, Opera North, De Nederlandse Opera and Opera De Nantes.

== Vocal coach ==
Burnett has developed her own vocal training technique having started off studying at the Royal Scottish Academy of Music & Drama, the Guildhall School of Music & Dram and the National Opera Studio. She also gained an ARCM from the Royal Academy of Music. She has worked with singers as varied as Sarah Brightman, Susan Boyle, Gary Lightbody from Snow Patrol, Sam Smith, and Nicole Scherzinger.

She joined The X Factor in series 2 as Louis Walsh's vocal coach and coached Shayne Ward to success as the series winner. In 2005, as well as working with Louis with groups. In 2006 she became the sole vocal coach on the show and also coached Cowell and Sharon Osbourne's acts. She subsequently coached Leona Lewis in 2006. She was initially not rehired for the 2010 series, but then replaced the new coaches after they were sacked by Cowell, to coach his groups.

Burnett became the vocal coach on the first three series of Britain's Got Talent, and the vocal coach on America's Got Talent (Series 4 and 5). She coached Britain's Got Talent winner Paul Potts in 2007, and contestants Faryl Smith and Andrew Johnston in 2008. She also worked with Susan Boyle on several of her albums and is featured in the TV specials I Dreamed a Dream: The Susan Boyle Story (2009) and Susan Boyle: An Unlikely Superstar (2011). In Summer 2010, while working in Los Angeles on America's Got Talent, she started working with 10-year-old singer, Jackie Evancho, and is credited as a vocal consultant on Evancho's first recordings for Sony Music.

Having worked on the BBC series Last Choir Standing, at the beginning of 2009, Burnett was asked by Andrew Lloyd Webber to work with him on the BBC TV show, Eurovision: Your Country Needs You, to select an artist to represent the UK at the Eurovision Song Contest in Moscow. Lloyd-Webber was so impressed with Burnett's work with the singers on the show, that he asked her to work with the singers in Love Never Dies, his follow-up to Phantom of the Opera. Burnett later continued as vocal coach for the London show.

Burnett completed a second stint as vocal coach on the 2010 America's Got Talent where the show's grand finale featured two singers, Jackie Evancho and Michael Grimm. Yvie also worked on season 6 in 2011, which was again won by a singer, Landau Eugene Murphy.

When the BBC launched The Voice UK in January 2012, Yvie was hired to work behind the scenes with the singers for "The Blind Auditions" and she was then asked to work on the live shows. Yvie was also twice seen later that year with Andrew Lloyd Webber. First, on ITV's Superstar show and second on the Canadian show Over the Rainbow on CBC.

Yvie went on to work with all of the Principal singers in the Arena Production of Jesus Christ Superstar which opened at The O2 Arena in London on Friday 21 September 2012. In the show programme Chris Moyles credits Yvie and former X Factor Musical Director, Nigel Wright, with introducing him to Andrew and convincing him to do the role having worked with him five and a half years previously on The X Factor: Battle of the Stars.

In 2013, Yvie has been working on the ITV2 show The Big Reunion, the second series of The Voice UK, new NBC Show The Winner Is and is appearing on the new ITV show Your Face Sounds Familiar.

In 2014 Yvie worked on Series 3 & Series 4 of The Voice UK and worked in the US on Broadway 4D. She also enjoyed working with Sam Smith, Hannah Reid of London Grammar and Chloe Howl during the year as well as doing her TV work. Yvie started writing a weekly column for the YL Magazine of Aberdeen's Press & Journal newspaper.

Yvie became a judge in 2015 when she was one of the three judges on the prestigious BBC Songs of Praise School Choir of the Year 2015, which was held at Nottingham's Albert Hall. She was also a judge on BBC Radio Ulster's School Choir of the Year 2015.

In 2015, she was a member of the British jury in the Eurovision Song Contest 2015.

Yvie returned to performing when she was asked by the sponsors of the Scottish Grand Nation to sing the song "Caledonia" at the start of the event in April 2016.

She also performed her version of the song on STV the evening before the race and released the song as a single.

Yvie writes a weekly column for her hometown newspaper, the Press & Journal and it is published every Saturday in their YL Magazine.

Yvie published her first book "Yes, You Can Sing" on September 7, 2017, which is a mixture of singing tips and stories of her work as singer and a vocal coach.

She traveled to Mumbai in 2019 to speak at the All About Music conference and continues to tour the world with her singing clients.
