= West Riding County Football Association =

Area sporting organization with 19th century origins

- West Riding County FA logo
- Abbreviation: West Riding FA
- Formation: 1896
- Purpose: County football association
- Headquarters: Woodlesford, Leeds
- Location: West Riding of Yorkshire (northern part)
- Coordinates: 53.749789°N 1.440151°W
- Chief Executive: Miss H Simpson
- Website: www.westridingfa.com

The West Riding County Football Association is the governing body of football in northern parts of the West Riding of Yorkshire, England. Its headquarters are in the village of Woodlesford, 6 miles (9.7 km) south east of Leeds.

Affiliated members pay a fee commensurate with the level of competition they play in. Affiliated members benefit from access to support and guidance on such areas as health and safety and access to finance or grants. The County FA is directly responsible for the governance of County Cup competitions.

== Membership ==
Clubs located within the geographical area of the old West Riding of Yorkshire boundaries are eligible for affiliation to the Association, including those participating at the higher levels of the Football League System in England. However, any parts of the West Riding within 20 miles of Sheffield Cathedral are instead part of the Sheffield & Hallamshire FA. The latter covers virtually all of South Yorkshire (excluding only the area around Askern, Hatfield and Thorne) and some southern areas of West Yorkshire such as Emley, Hemsworth and Nostell.

Clubs who enter teams into Saturday and Sunday competitions are required to have a separate affiliation for each. The Association is divided into thirteen District Associations covering the old West Riding of Yorkshire.

- Barkston Ash District Association.
- Bradford District Association
- Castleford District Association
- Craven District Association.
- Goole & Thorne District Association
- Halifax District Association
- Harrogate District Association
- Heavy Woollen District Association
- Huddersfield District Association
- Keighley District Association
- Leeds District Association
- Wakefield District Association
- Wharfedale District Association

== League competitions ==
There is no County league competition, instead there are forty league competitions at all levels within the thirteen District Associations. The County FA has direct governance of the rules of the competitions run by the affiliated districts. Of the Open Age leagues, there are 13 for men, 1 for women and 12 men's played on Sundays. There are 12 Junior Boy's Leagues and 2 Junior Girl's Leagues. There are 4 divisions of men's pan-disability leagues as well as one for under 16's and one for women. Where appropriate, the relevant level in the English Football League System of the league in the lists below are shown in brackets.

=== Senior Leagues ===
Most of the Senior Men's Leagues are part of the Football League System, of which the West Yorkshire Association Premier Division is the highest represented of the County Association.

- Craven and District Football League – Premier Division (L14); Division 1 (L15); Division 2 (L16); Division 3 (L17); Division 4 (L18)
- Harrogate & District League- Premier Division (L14); Division 1 (L15); Division 2 (L16); Division 3 (L17)
- Halifax Valley & District League- Premier Division (L14); Division 1 (L15)
- Huddersfield and District Association Football League – Division 1 (L14); Division 2 (L15);Division 3 (L16); Division 4 (L17)
- Selby & District Invitation League – Division 1; Division 2
- Wakefield & District League Premier Division (L14); Division 1 (L15); Division 2 (L16); Division 3 (L17)
- West Yorkshire Association Football League- Premier Division (L11); Division 1 (L12); Division 2 (L13)
- Wharfedale Association League – Premier Division; Division 1; Division 2
- Yorkshire Christian Football League – Premier Division; Division 1; Division 2
- Yorkshire Amateur League – Supreme (L11); Premier (L12); Championship (L13); Division 1 (L14); Division 2 (L15); Division 3 (L16); Division 4 (L17); Division 5 (L18); absorbed most clubs of the defunct L11 West Riding County Amateur Football League in 2019 to become the Supreme Division

=== Junior Leagues ===
- Craven Aire & Wharfe Junior League
- Garforth Junior League
- Harrogate Development League
- Harrogate & Wharfedale Friendly League
- Huddersfield & District Junior League
- Nidderdale Mini-Soccer League
- Selby District Junior League

=== Women's & Girls Leagues ===
- Harrogate & Craven District Girls Junior League
- West Riding Girls League
- West Riding Women's League
- Women’s Beginner League

=== Sunday Leagues ===
- Bradford Sunday Alliance League
- Bridge Balti Halifax Sunday Football League
- Castleford & District Sunday League
- Claro Sunday League
- Goole & District Sunday League
- Heavy Woollen Sunday League
- Kirklees Sunday League
- Leeds Combination League
- Leeds Sunday Alliance Football League
- Leeds Sunday Leagues
- Wakefield & District Sunday League
- Wharfedale Triangle League

=== Friendly Competition ===
- Yorkshire Old Boy's Shield

== Cup competitions ==
All the above leagues and District Associations run a variety of knockout competitions. In addition, the County Association also run the knockout competitions listed below for affiliated clubs. The West Riding County FA ran a Senior Cup competition from 1919 until 1999 that featured affiliated clubs that were in the highest levels of the football league system, such as Leeds United. In eight out of the last 12 years of its existence, there was no competition and was a contributing factor to its demise.

- County FA County Cup – First competition was in 1927 won by Leeds United Reserves. Clubs are selected to compete by the Council of the County FA.
- County FA Challenge Cup – Affiliated clubs enter the competition by application for their senior side. The first competition was in 1900 and was won by Hunslet.
- County FA Challenge Trophy – Affiliated clubs enter the competition by application for their reserve sides. The first competition was in 1998 and was won by Ossett Common Rovers.
- County FA Sunday Cup – Affiliated clubs enter the competition by application for their senior side. The first competition was in 1969 and was won by Old Bank W.M.C.
- County FA Sunday Trophy -Affiliated clubs enter the competition by application for their reserve sides. The first competition was in 1998and was won by Illingworth.
- County FA u16 Junior Cup – Affiliated clubs enter the competition by application. The first competition was in 1949 and won by Whitwood Juniors.
- County FA u14 Junior Trophy – Affiliated clubs enter the competition by application. The first competition was in 1998 and won by Rothwell Town Juniors.
- County FA u12 Junior Shield – Affiliated clubs enter the competition by application. The first competition was in 2002 and won by Farsley Celtic Juniors.
- County FA Women's County Cup – Affiliated clubs enter the competition by application. The first competition was in 2000 and won by Doncaster Belles.
- County FA Minor Cup – This is an inter-district association representative competition open to all affiliated District Associations. The first competition was in 1929 and won by Craven Minor F.A.
- County FA Girls u16 Junior Cup – Affiliated clubs enter the competition by application. The first competition was in 2009 and won by Lepton Highlanders.
- County FA Girls u14 Junior Trophy – Affiliated clubs enter the competition by application. The first competition was in 2009 and won by Batley Juniors.
