= Classic FM Magazine =

Classical music magazine

- Digital managing editor: Maddy Shaw Roberts
- Senior managing editor: Sally Ardis
- Managing editor: Joseph Zubier
- Executive president: Ashley Tabor-King
- Group chief executive: Simon Pitts
- Chief broadcasting and content officer: James Rea
- Categories: Classical music
- Frequency: Monthly
- Circulation: 41,000
- Total circulation: 35,751 (2008)
- Founder: Ashley Tabor-King
- First issue: 1995; 31 years ago
- Final issue Number: April 2012; 14 years ago 208
- Company: Haymarket Media Group
- Country: United Kingdom
- Based in: London
- Language: English
- Website: classicfm.co.uk
- ISSN: 1476-4504 (print); 2040-1388 (web)
- OCLC: 46447814

Classic FM Magazine was a magazine published by Haymarket in the United Kingdom each month. It was the printed organ of Classic FM, a British classical commercial radio station. The magazine reviewed classical recordings and live performances and often included tracks from recent releases on its cover disc.

Launched in 1995, the magazine was initially published under contract by John Brown Publishing. In July 2000 it was announced that the radio station had cancelled the contract with John Brown Publishing and signed a new agreement with Haymarket Publishing, to which company the magazine transferred in November 2000.

In January 2012 it was announced that the magazine would cease to be published. The final issue, dated April 2012, was published in March 2012.
