= Britain's Got Talent series 2 =

Britain's Got Talent
- Series 2
- Hosted by: Ant & Dec (ITV); Stephen Mulhern (ITV2)
- Judges: Piers Morgan; Amanda Holden; Simon Cowell
- Winner: George Sampson
- Runner-up: Signature

Release
- Original network: ITV; ITV2 (BGMT)
- Original release: 12 April – 31 May 2008

Series chronology
- ← Previous; Series 1 Next → Series 3

Judges and Presenter(s) for Britain's Got Talent Series 2

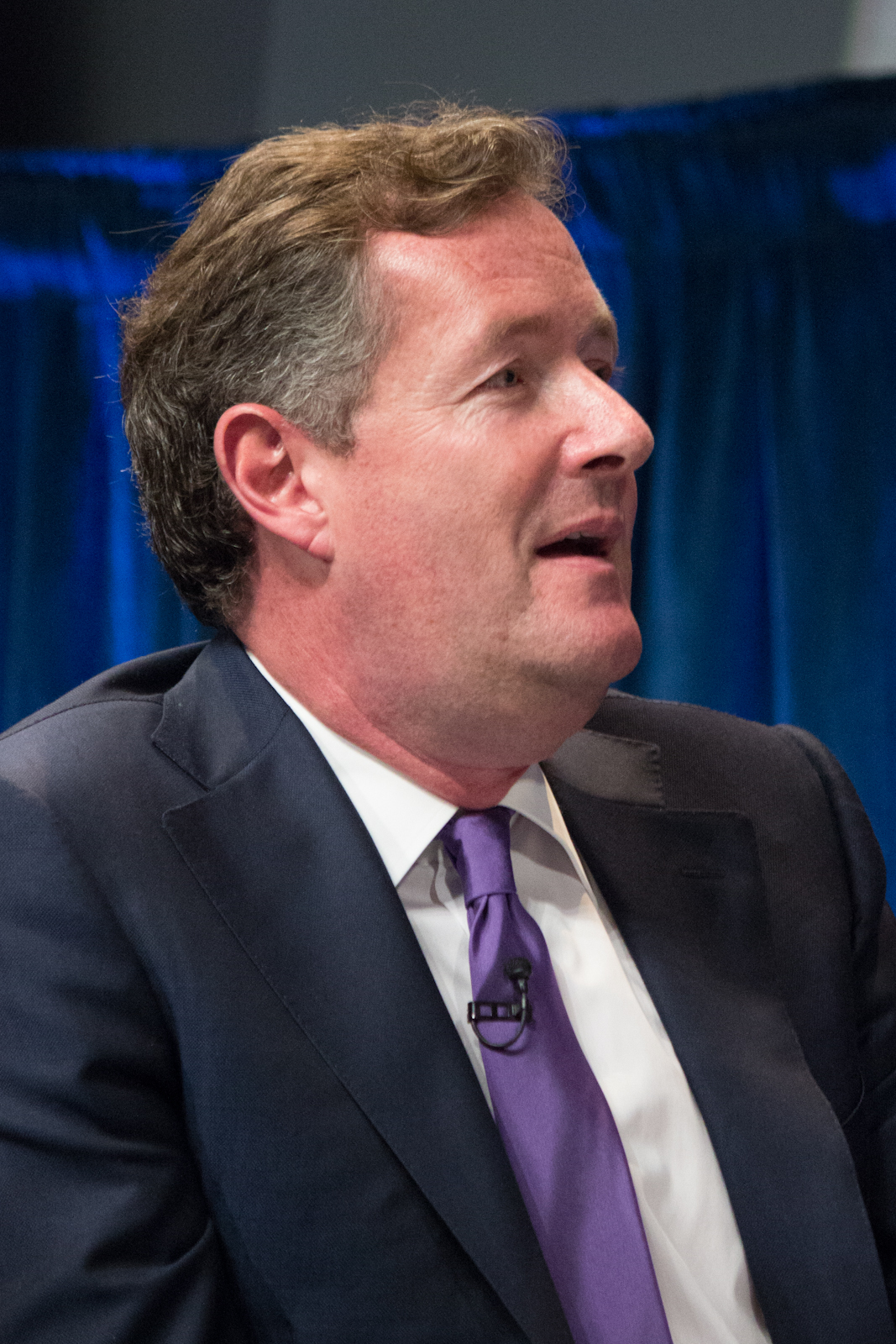
Piers Morgan

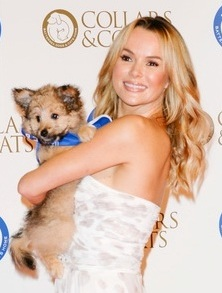
Amanda Holden

Simon Cowell

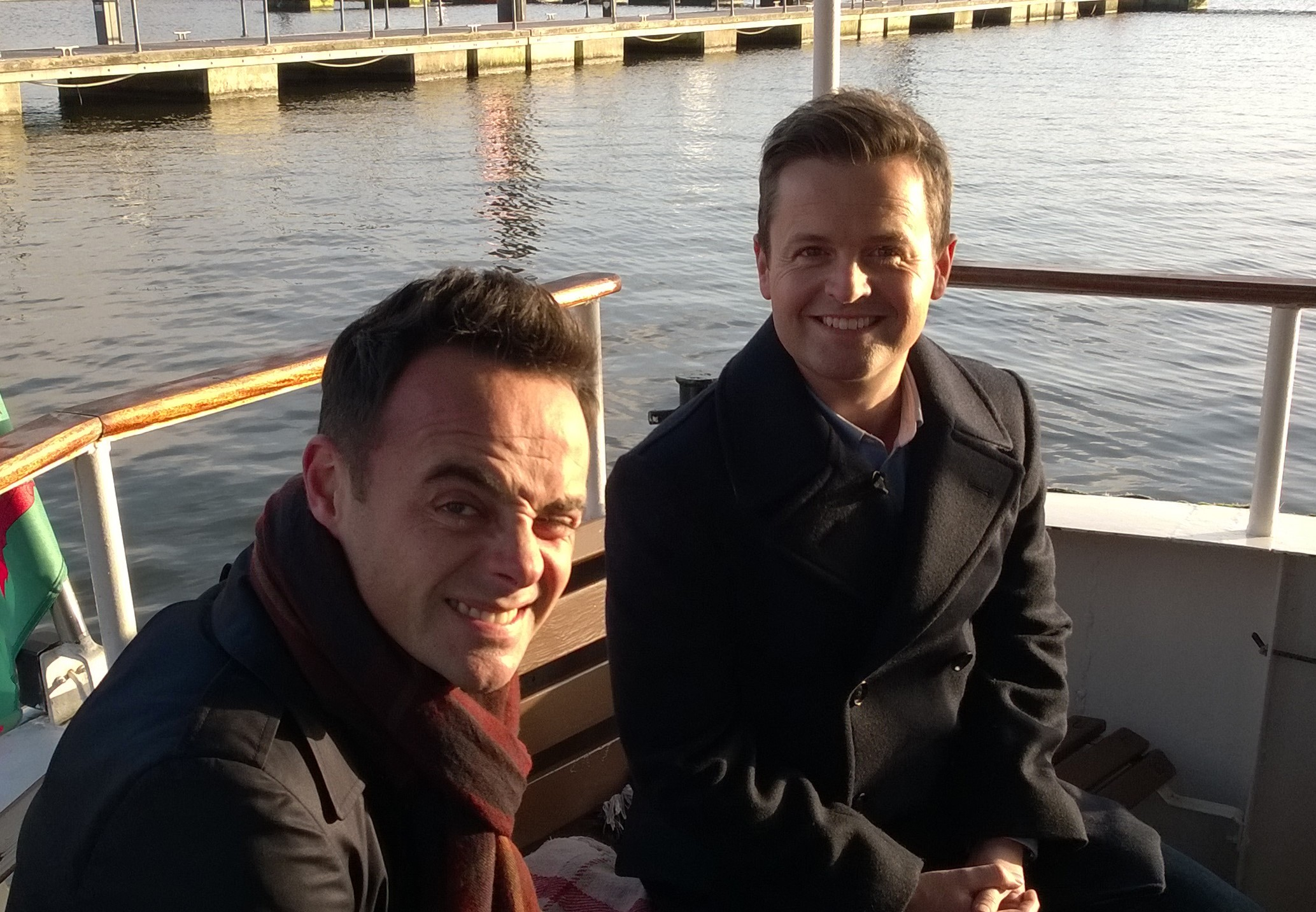
Ant & Dec (ITV1)

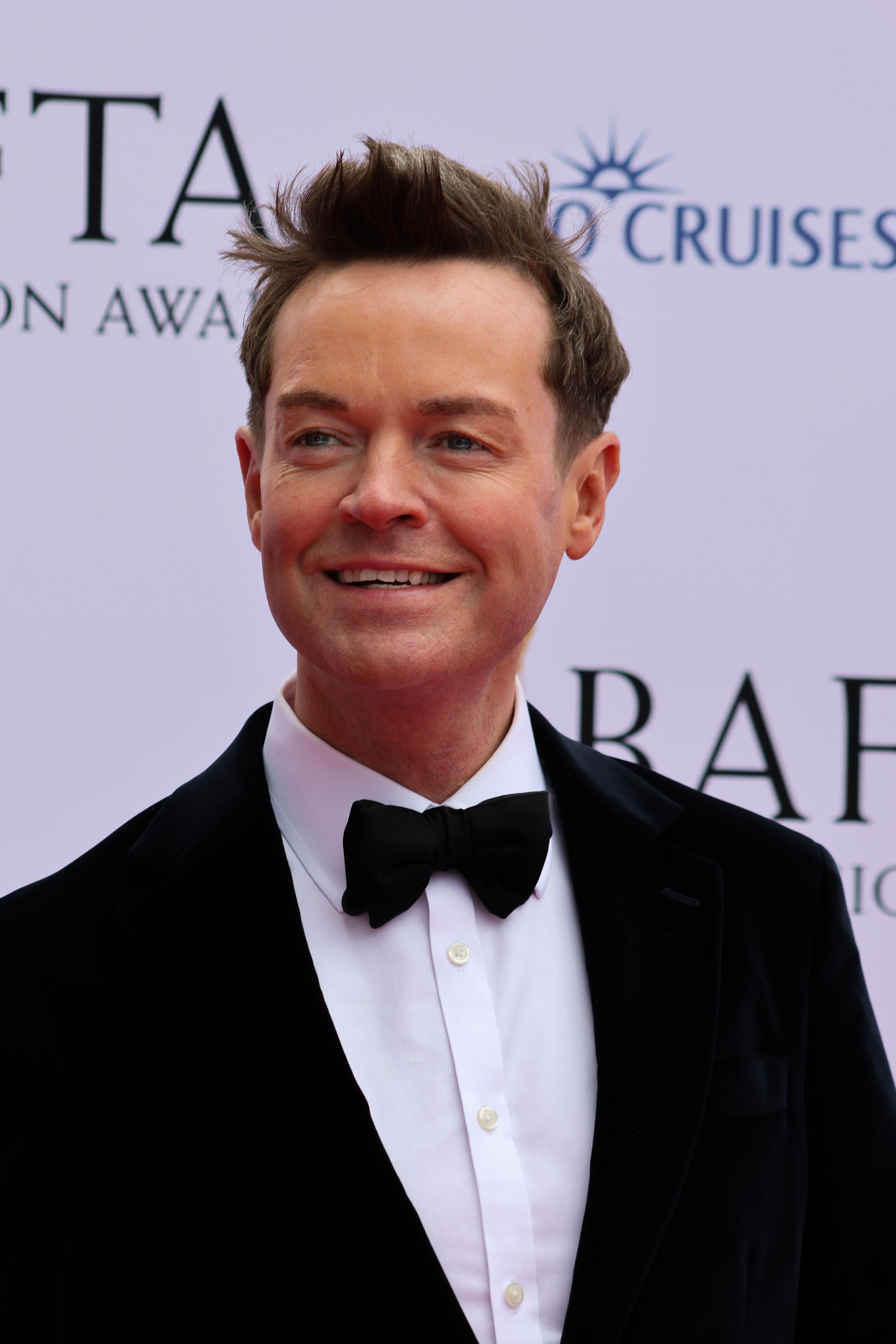
Stephen Mulhern (ITV2)

The second series of British talent competition programme Britain's Got Talent was broadcast on ITV, from 12 April to 31 May 2008. Following the success of its first series, ITV commissioned the programme for additional episodes, with more venues used for auditions than in the previous series, and the number of semi-finalists, semi-final rounds, and finalists increased by production staff. Both the judges from the first series – Simon Cowell, Amanda Holden and Piers Morgan – and Ant & Dec returned to co-host the second series, along with Stephen Mulhern returning to front the second series of Britain's Got More Talent on ITV2.

The second series was won by street dancer George Sampson, with dance duo Signature finishing in second place and opera singer Andrew Johnston third. During its broadcast, the series proved to be a greater ratings success, averaging 10.2 million viewers. ITV was forced to defend the programme during its second series, after viewers criticised the involvement of a professional group in the contest.

== Series overview ==
Following open auditions held the previous year, the Judge's Auditions took place early in 2008, within London, Manchester, Birmingham, Cardiff, Glasgow and Blackpool. With the success of the previous series, the production team decided to expand the show's filming schedule to include more episodes. This led to the addition of two more episodes for auditions and two more live episodes for semi-finals, in turn leading to a direct increase in the number of semi-finalists that the judges could move beyond the auditions stage of the competition. Both the judges and the presenters who took part in the first series agreed to return for the second series, leading to no significant changes in the panel or hosts.

Of the participants that took part, only forty made it past this stage and into the five live semi-finals, with eight appearing in each one, and ten of these acts making it into the live final. The following below lists the results of each participant's overall performance in this series:

Key: Winner | Runner-Up | Finalist | Semi-finalist

Participant	Age(s) ^{1}	Genre	Performance Type	Semi-Final	Result
Andrew Johnston	13	Singing	Boy Soprano	2	Third Place
Andrew Muir	24	Singing	Singer	4	Finalist
Anya Sparks	42	Dance	Dancer	5	Eliminated
Bang On!	34 & 27	Music	Percussion Duo	2	Eliminated
Boogie Babes	8–12	Dance	Dance Group	4	Eliminated
Boogie Wonderland	12–21	Dance	Dance Group	1	Eliminated
Caburlesque	22-26	Dance	Cabaret & Burlesque Dance Group	5	Eliminated
Charlie Green	10	Singing	Singer	3	Eliminated
Charlie Wernham	13	Comedy	Stand Up Comedian	4	Eliminated
Cheeky Monkeys	8 & 9	Dance	Junior Dance Duo	2	Finalist
Craig Harper	35	Singing / Comedy	Vocal Impressionist	5	Eliminated
Dean Wilson	18	Singing	Musical Theatre Singer	1	Eliminated
Deans of Magic	46 & 38	Magic	Erotic Magic Duo	3	Eliminated
Diva Las Vegas	20-48	Singing / Dance	Singer & Dance Group	5	Eliminated
Escala	23–26	Music	String Quartet	5	Finalist
Faryl Smith	12	Singing	Singer	4	Finalist
Flava	17–28	Dance	Hip Hop Dance Group	2	Eliminated
George Sampson	14	Dance	Breakdancer	3	Winner
Harlequin Stage School	8–13	Dance	Irish Dance Group	4	Eliminated
Hoop La La	22, 23 & 24	Variety	Hula Hoop Trio	3	Eliminated
Iona Luvsandorj	27	Acrobatics	Contortionist	2	Eliminated
Irresistible	21–23	Singing	Singing Trio	3	Eliminated
James Stone	52	Singing	Singer	4	Eliminated
Jeremy Lynch	20	Variety	Football Freestyler	4	Eliminated
Kate & Gin	16 & 6 ^{2}	Animals	Dog Act	1	Finalist
Kay & Harvey	56 & 71	Singing / Music	Singer & Keyboardist	2	Eliminated
Madonna Decena	32	Singing	Singer	5	Eliminated
Mandy Ellen Dancers	10–24	Dance	Dance Group	2	Eliminated
Mary Halford March	6–9	Dance	Dance Group	3	Eliminated
Michael Machell	57	Music	Keyboardist	1	Eliminated
Nemesis	18–22	Dance	Hip Hop Dance Group	5	Finalist
Per Diem	24 & 23	Singing / Music	Singing & Guitarist Duo	5	Eliminated
Phil Blackmore	34	Danger	Balancer & Juggler	1	Eliminated
Sauris Nandi	64	Magic	Magician	2	Eliminated
Signature	29 & 34	Dance	Bhangra Dance Duo	1	Runner-Up
Sophie Mei	20	Dance	Belly Dancer	1	Eliminated
Strike	22 & 19	Variety	Martial Arts Duo	3	Finalist
Tracey Lee Collins	44	Singing	Drag Singer	1	Eliminated
Urban Gypsies	35–50	Dance	Belly Dance Group	3	Eliminated
Vizage	34 & 30	Singing / Magic	Singer & Quick Change Duo	4	Eliminated

- ^1 Ages denoted for a participant(s), pertain to their final performance for this series.
- ^2 The latter value pertains to the age of the dog, as disclosed by its owner.

=== Semi-final summary ===
Buzzed out | Judges' vote | Advanced – Public Vote
Advanced – Judges' Vote | Eliminated – Judges' Vote | Eliminated

==== Semi-final 1 (26 May) ====
Semi-Finalist	Order	Performance Type	Buzzes and Judges' Vote			Result
Semi-Finalist	Order	Performance Type	Cowell	Holden	Morgan	Result
Boogie Wonderland	1	Dance Group				4th - Eliminated
Kate & Gin	2	Dog Act				2nd (Won Judges' Vote)
Michael Machell	3	Keyboardist				8th - Eliminated
Dean Wilson	4	Musical Theatre Singer				3rd (Lost Judges' Vote)
Sophie Mei	5	Belly Dancer				5th - Eliminated
Tracey Lee Collins	6	Drag Singer				6th - Eliminated
Phil Blackmore	7	Balancer & Juggler				7th - Eliminated
Signature	8	Bhangra Dance Duo				1st (Won Public Vote)

==== Semi-final 2 (27 May) ====
Semi-Finalist	Order	Performance Type	Buzzes and Judges' Vote			Result
Semi-Finalist	Order	Performance Type	Cowell	Holden	Morgan	Result
Mandy Ellen Dancers	1	Dance Group				5th - Eliminated
Iona Luvsandorj	2	Contortionist				4th - Eliminated
Cheeky Monkeys	3	Dance Duo				2nd (Won Judges' Vote)
Kay & Harvey	4	Opera Singer & Keyboardist				8th - Eliminated
Bang On!	5	Percussion Duo				7th - Eliminated
Flava	6	Hip Hop Dance Duo				3rd (Lost Judges' Vote)
Sauris Nandi	7	Magician				6th - Eliminated
Andrew Johnston	8	Boy Soprano				1st (Won Public Vote)

==== Semi-final 3 (28 May) ====
Semi-Finalist	Order	Performance Type	Buzzes and Judges' Vote			Result
Semi-Finalist	Order	Performance Type	Cowell	Holden	Morgan	Result
Irresistible	1	Singing Trio				4th - Eliminated
Strike	2	Martial Arts Duo				2nd (Won Judges' Vote)
Mary Halford March	3	Dance Group				6th - Eliminated
The Deans of Magic	4	Erotic Magic Duo				8th - Eliminated
Charlie Green	5	Singer				3rd - (Lost Judges' Vote)
Urban Gypsies	6	Belly Dance Group				7th - Eliminated
Hoop La La	7	Hula Hoop Trio				5th - Eliminated
George Sampson	8	Breakdancer				1st (Won Public Vote)

==== Semi-final 4 (29 May) ====
Semi-Finalist	Order	Performance Type	Buzzes and Judges' Vote			Result
Semi-Finalist	Order	Performance Type	Cowell	Holden	Morgan	Result
James Stone	1	Singer				6th - Eliminated
Charlie Wernham	2	Stand Up Comedian				5th - Eliminated
Harlequin Stage School	3	Irish Dance Group				8th - Eliminated
Andrew Muir	4	Singer				2nd (Won Judges' Vote)
The Boogie Babes	5	Dance Group				4th - Eliminated
Vizage	6	Singer & Quick Change Duo		^{3}		7th - Eliminated
Jeremy Lynch	7	Football Freestyler				3rd (Lost Judges' Vote)
Faryl Smith	8	Singer				1st (Won Public Vote)

- ^3 Cowell pressed Holden's buzzer during Vizage's performance.

==== Semi-final 5 (30 May) ====
Semi-Finalist	Order	Performance Type	Buzzes and Judges' Vote			Result
Semi-Finalist	Order	Performance Type	Cowell	Holden	Morgan	Result
Caburlesque	1	Cabaret & Burlesque Dance Group				8th - Eliminated
Madonna Decena	2	Singer				4th - Eliminated
Anya Sparks	3	Dancer				5th - Eliminated
Craig Harper	4	Vocal Impressionist				3rd (Lost Judges' Vote)
Diva Las Vegas	5	Singer & Dance Group				7th - Eliminated
Nemesis	6	Hip Hop Dance Group				2nd (Won Judges' Vote)
Per Diem	7	Singing & Guitarist Duo				6th - Eliminated
Escala	8	String Quartet				1st (Won Public Vote)

=== Final (31 May) ===
Winner | Runner-up

Finalist	Order	Performance Type	Finished
Cheeky Monkeys	1	Dance Duo	6th
Andrew Muir	2	Singer	10th
Kate & Gin	3	Dog Act	7th
Nemesis	4	Hip Hop Dance Group	8th
Strike	5	Martial Arts Duo	9th
Andrew Johnston	6	Boy Soprano	3rd
George Sampson	7	Breakdancer	1st
Faryl Smith	8	Singer	5th
Escala	9	String Quartet	4th
Signature	10	Bhangra Dance Duo	2nd

== Ratings ==
Episode	Air Date	Total Viewers (millions)	ITV 1 Weekly rank	Viewer Share
Auditions 1	12 April	9.44	6	37.0%
Auditions 2	19 April	10.96	1	43.3%
Auditions 3	26 April	9.86	3	41.3%
Auditions 4	3 May	9.12	5	39.1%
Auditions 5	10 May	8.17	6	37.9%
Auditions 6	17 May	9.11	2	37.5%
Auditions 7	24 May	8.27	5	37.2%
Semi-final 1	26 May	11.33	4	42.0%
Semi-final 2	27 May	9.29	9	35.3%
Semi-final 3	28 May	10.03	6	35.9%
Semi-final 4	29 May	10.13	5	41.9%
Semi-final 5	30 May	11.86	2	50.0%
Live final	31 May	11.52	3	51.1%
Live final results	31 May	13.88	1	55.1%

== Criticism ==
The second series of Britain's Got Talent faced criticism for the involvement of professional performers in the contest. Media outlets revealed evidence that the group Escala, who took part in the contest in 2008, had previously been involved as guest performers for a wrap party on The X Factor in 2007. ITV refuted allegations that this was unfair conduct against other participants, by arguing that the programme's researchers applied the same process and treatment to everyone who auditioned, and that the contest was open to anyone regardless of their experience with the talent they chose to perform with.
