= Signature (dance group) =

English dance duo

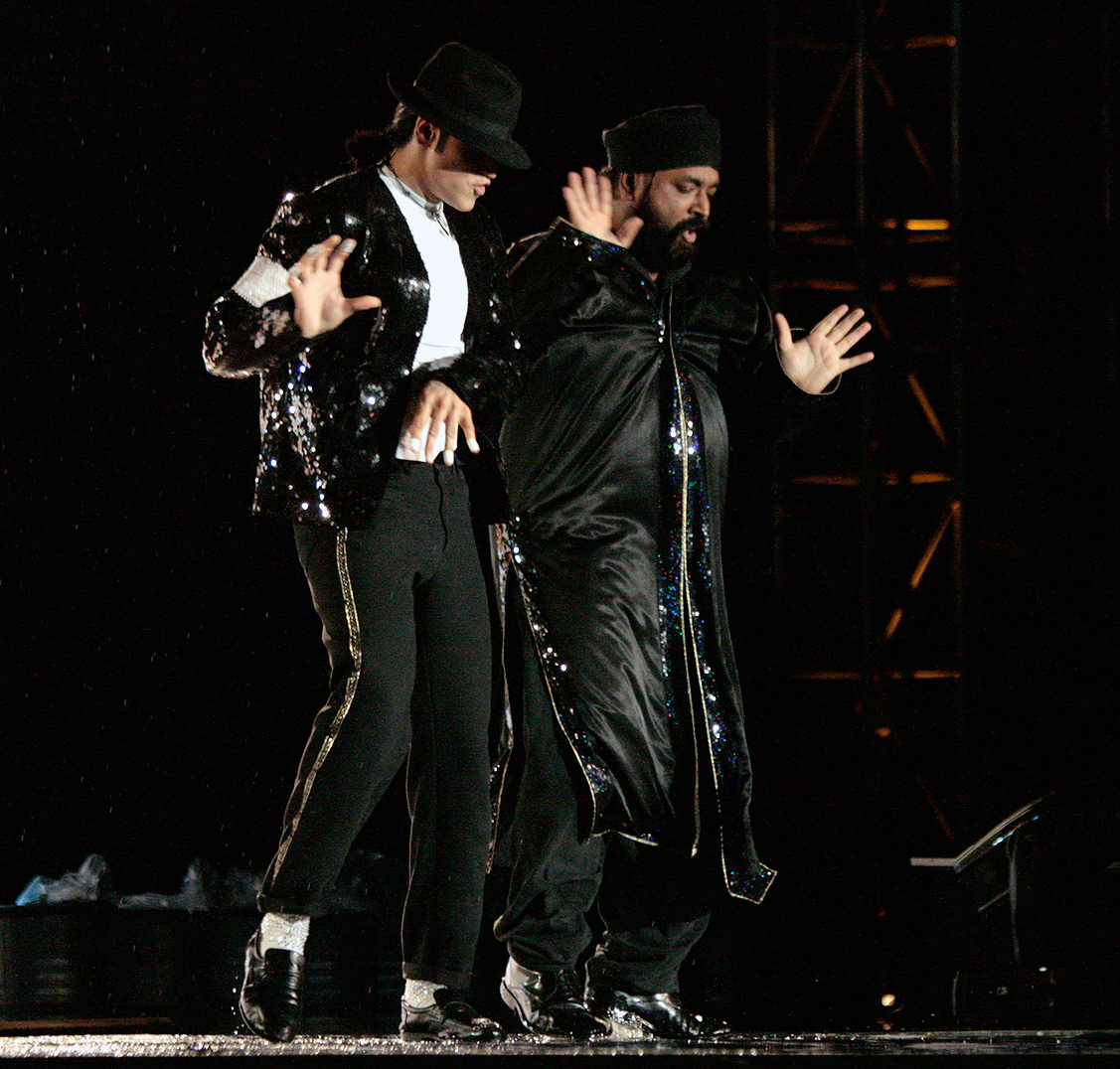
- Performing at the Save The World Award 2009

Background information
- Origin: London, England
- Genres: pop, bhangra
- Years active: 2001–present
- Members: Suleman Mirza; Madhu Singh
- Website: signatureofficial.com

Signature are English dance duo Suleman Mirza and Madhu Singh. Their style of dance is British Bhangra and they frequently base their performances around Michael Jackson songs, such as "Billie Jean" and "Thriller". They gained wide recognition during their performances in the second series of Britain's Got Talent, in which they were runners-up to the winner street dancer George Sampson.

== Early years ==
Suleman Mirza is a trainee solicitor/lawyer His involvement concerns the Michael Jackson tribute moves of the dance. Madhu Singh works at PC World in Terminal 5 at Heathrow Airport. Singh's main involvement is entering part-way through the act and performing Bhangra dance. Mirza, a British Muslim of Pakistani descent, and Singh, a British Sikh of Indian descent, met when they were both auditioning separately for a student talent contest in 2000 at the University of Westminster. Being from the same part of South Asia, Punjab (a region that was carved into modern Pakistan and India during the Partition of 1947), a place well known for its dance and music, they were both interested in performing together. At the time, Mirza was a full-time economics and business student at the University of Westminster. This led to the formation of their dance group, Signature, in 2001. Since then, they performed their acts in various British Asian and Bollywood-themed shows, sometimes alongside several Bollywood movie stars.

In addition, Mirza has worked with Chris Brown, Leona Lewis, McFly, Dannii Minogue, Jay Sean, Alexandra Burke, Sugababes, and choreographer Lavelle Smith Junior (who has choreographed for Michael Jackson, Janet Jackson, and Beyoncé Knowles). In 2006, Mirza performed for Michael Jackson at the televised World Music Awards 2006 held at the Earls Court Exhibition Centre, London, where he had met Jackson in person. Singh, meanwhile, has hosted television shows on the Zee Music channel, and had also appeared on the music video for Jay Sean's "Eyes on You" in 2004.

== Britain's Got Talent ==
=== Audition ===
On Britain's Got Talent in their audition in London, which aired on 24 April 2008, Signature performed to "Nachna Onda Nei" by Tigerstyle featuring Kaka Bhaniawala—a bhangra tune mixed to the beat of Michael Jackson's "Billie Jean". They combined the Michael Jackson lyrics and style of dancing with traditional bhangra style music and dancing in a comedy dance act. Before the audition, Mirza said: "I don't think the judges will have ever seen an act like mine before...in this act there will be a lot of moon walking, but there is a twist, and if they weren't Michael Jackson fans before they may even turn into one."

Mirza is then shown moonwalking around the stage, and performing Michael Jackson style dance moves. As he dances, Madhu Singh, dressed in a white coat, walks past the show presenters Ant & Dec at the side of the stage and makes his way onto the stage with a broom. The two then start a Bhangra/Michael Jackson "dance off", bringing with it a standing ovation from the audience and one of the judges, Amanda Holden.

=== Semi-final ===
In the first semi-final on 26 May they performed to "Thriller", winning the public vote and so went through to the final.

=== Final ===
Before the final show, Simon Cowell said that he believed that Signature were one of five acts who could win the show. In the final they again performed to "Nachna Onda Nei" and finished in the top three alongside street dancer, George Sampson and boy soprano, Andrew Johnston. Sampson won the show with Signature finishing as runners-up.

== After Britain's Got Talent ==
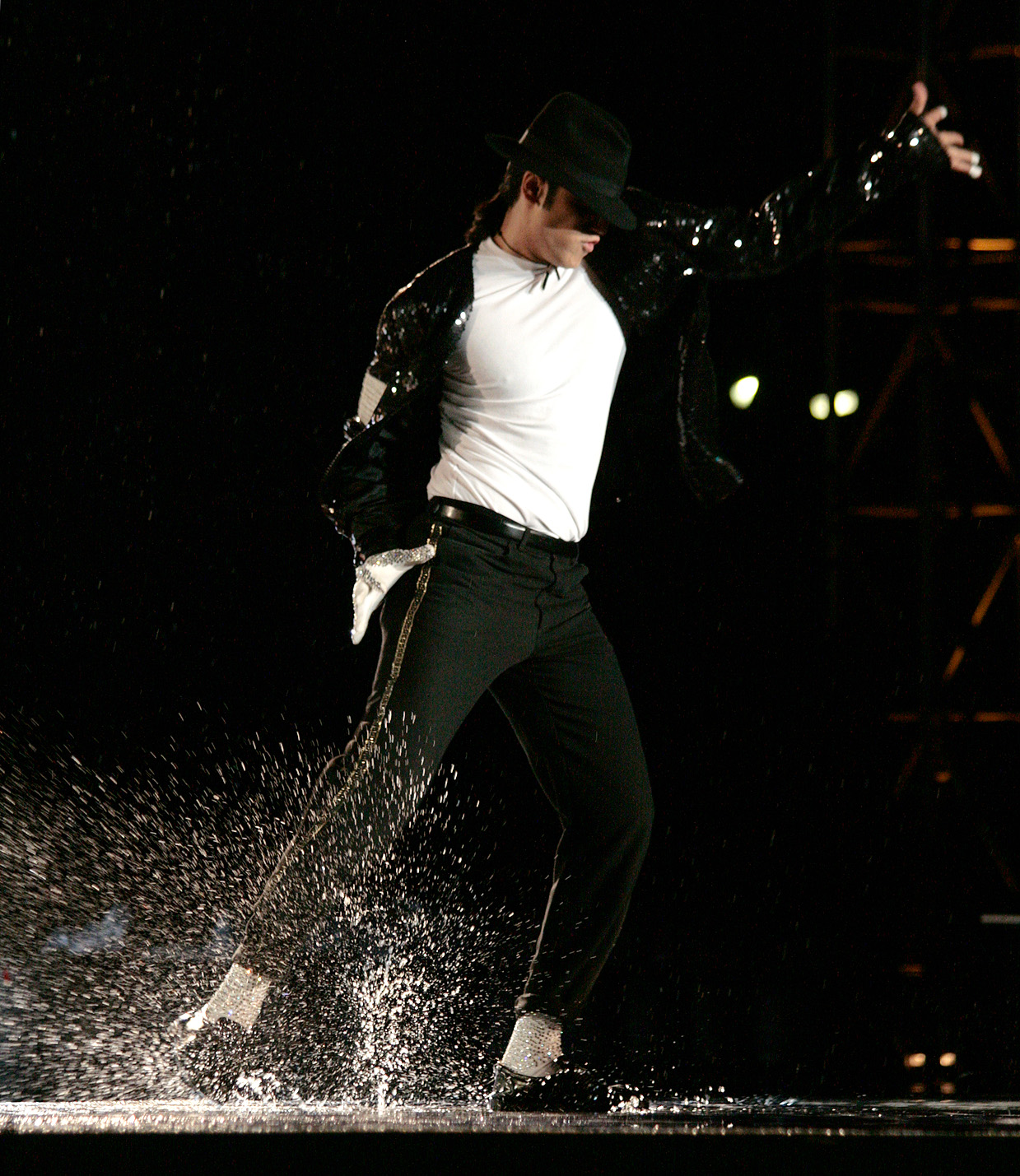
Suleman Mirza (2009)

Following the end of the second series of Britain's Got Talent, Signature were given the "official stamp of approval by Michael Jackson himself", while members of the Jackson family have become their fans and got in touch with Signature soon after the show ended.

In June 2008, Signature were "offered a six-figure deal to be the face of Virgin Media" for its forthcoming "Bollywood on Demand" TV service. The managing director of marketing at Virgin Media, James Kydd, has commented, "Getting Signature on-board could be the perfect way for new audiences to find out more about Bollywood."

In December 2008, it was announced that Signature would appear on the live tour for the fifth series of The X Factor.

On 29 January 2009, they appeared as contestants on Ready Steady Cook, where they announced that they were working on a sitcom and movie script.

In May 2009 they appeared in series 2, episode 5 of The Omid Djalili Show where they danced and Djalili joined in with their dance act. Signature also appeared at the Spice Times Awards 2010 as the main act. On 27 July 2012, Signature made an appearance at the opening ceremony of the London Olympics.

On 21 May 2016, they performed in one of London's biggest Asian comedy and entertainment events hosted by Studio1 Media. They performed alongside many other notable faces such as; Nadia Ali, Ezza (Ezzakins), Rumena Begum (Rumena_101), Sham Idrees, Karim Metwaly (AreWeFamousNow), Sheikh Akbar, Tasha Tah, Zack Knight, Mumzy Stranger, Char Avell, Shaful Khan, Jernade Miah, Babrul Hoque (Bengali Blitz), Kawsar Ahmed (Kash), Nishat Monsur (Nish), Islah Abdur-Rahman and Michael Truong from the Corner Shop Show, Dulzy Ahmed, Hussnain Lahori, Humza Arshad, Rameet Kaur, Iksy and Bambi Bains (TeamPBN).
