= Nachural Records =

Nachural Records is a British bhangra record label based in Birmingham, West Midlands, England. It was formed in 1991 by Ninder Johal, tabla-player for the group Achanak.

Throughout the 1990s, Nachural became a leading label for contemporary UK-based bhangra, releasing music from Anakhi, Johnny Zee, TSB Golden Star, and Johal's Achanak.

In 2003, Nachural scored their biggest hit as the Panjabi MC remix of "Mundian To Bach Ke", a bhangra song performed by Punjabi artist Labh Janjua, broke into the UK singles chart at number 5.

Other keys acts on the label included Sahara, Sona Family, and Tigerstyle.

In later some catalogues and artist rosters of Nachural Records was proposed and completing acquired by T-Series according to sources
