= Snake charmer (disambiguation) =

Snake charmer or snake charming most commonly refers to the Indian practice of "hypnotizing" snakes.

Snake charmer may also refer to:

== Music ==
- Snake charmer song, also known as "The Streets of Cairo", or "The Poor Little Country Maid"
- "Snake charmer" (song) by Teddy Powell (composer) and Leonard Whitcup (lyricist), published 1937
- Snakecharmer (album), by Sort Sol
- Snake Charmer (EP), an EP by Jah Wobble, The Edge and Holger Czukay
- "Snake Charmer" (Rainbow song), by Rainbow on their 1975 album Ritchie Blackmore's Rainbow
- "Snake Charmer" (song), by Panjabi MC
- "Snakecharmer", a song by the band Rage Against The Machine from the album Evil Empire
- Snakecharmer, a band and their eponymous debut album headed by Micky Moody

== Arts ==
- The Snake Charmer, an oil-on-canvas Orientalist painting by French artist Jean-Léon Gérôme produced around 1879.
- The Snake Charmer (Rousseau), 1907 painting by French artist Henri Rousseau
- Snake-charmer stone, a picture stone found at Smiss, När socken, Gotland, Sweden

== Other ==
- Snake Charmer (shotgun), a .410 gauge, stainless steel, single shot, break-action shotgun
- A famous "incident" on the UK game show Catchphrase
- Bill (Kill Bill), also known as Snake Charmer, a character from the Kill Bill films

== See also ==
- Snake handling (disambiguation)
