= Tigerstyle =

Scottish folkhop group

- Origin: Glasgow, Scotland
- Genres: Folkhop
- Years active: 1997–present
- Labels: Nachural Records
- Members: Raj Singh; Pops Singh
- Website: www.tigerstyleonline.co.uk

Tigerstyle is a Scottish folkhop group from Glasgow with a British Punjabi background.

== Background ==
Brothers Raj Singh (Kulraj Singh Burmy) and Pops (Amritpal Singh Burmy) come from a folk background, with the traditional upbringing of a Sikh family, with their roots in Punjab, Punjabi folk music, in particular Punjabi music from the late 1970s to early 1980s, including artists such as Kuldip Manak and Surinder Shinda as well as Bollywood music. They also list Rap, Hip hop, RnB and Drum n bass with artists such as Dr. Dre and Ice Cube as influences.

== Music career ==
They started their music career in 1997 when as DJs they created Desi Bombsquad Sound System with the intent of nurturing the bhangra scene in Scotland as they felt it lagged behind the English bhangra scene. The name Tigerstyle is taken from the Tiger Style of Shaolin Kung Fu named after the tiger, with the brothers coming from a Sikh warrior background which has its own martial art, Gatka, and the name Singh meaning lion.

The brothers have released a number of singles and albums and also done official remixes for artists such as Lisa Maffia and Raghav. After a legal dispute with previous record companies, they signed to Nachural Records, the label that launched Panjabi MC.

Tigerstyle have toured all over the world and shared stages with the likes of Lily Allen, Dub Pistols, Misty in Roots, Talvin Singh, Nitin Sawhney, Gunjan, Asian Dub Foundation, Badmarsh & Shri, Truth Hurts, Panjabi MC, Future World Funk as well as Bobby Friction and DJ Nihal on BBC Radio 1. Friction has said of Tigerstyle, "They are without doubt the next Asian/Bhangra act that will break through into the mainstream – it is only a question of time." On 28 October 2006 they performed on the BBC Electric Proms Asian Network gig.

In the second series of Britain's Got Talent on ITV1 in May 2008, the song used by dance act Signature in their audition and again in their performance in the final was "Nachna Onda Nei", a bhangra remix of Michael Jackson's "Billie Jean" and Queen and David Bowie's "Under Pressure" featuring Kaka Bhaniawala with covering vocals. As a result of it being featured, it made the top 100 for the first time, spending one week at #62

Tigerstyle are one of the few Asian acts to have ever recorded a live session for the late John Peel. They also performed on the BBC Introducing Stage at Glastonbury Festival in July 2007. Their Bollywood debut came in the shape of exclusive remixes of "Bas Ek Kinng" and "Bhootni Ke" under the guidance of hit music director Pritam, on the soundtrack of the blockbuster movie of summer 2008, Singh Is Kinng. They also collaborated again with Pritam for Pankaj Kapur's directoral debut Mausam.

Over the past few years Tigerstyle have gone on to work with other Bollywood Music Directors such as Sachin Jigar and Ram Sampath and have also developed a new fusion of Bhangra with Electronic Dance Music which they have named "DigiBhang". They have collaborated with artists including Soom T.

This new fusion style formed the basis of their 2013 album "Digi-Bhang". In the same year they transformed their studio produced album into a Live Band Performance. During the 2013 Edinburgh Fringe Festival, Tigerstyle performed at a one-off event named "DigiBhang Live" at the Assembly Rooms in Edinburgh with their newly formed band.

== Discography ==
=== Albums ===
Year	Album	Record label
2000	The Rising	Kismet Records
2001	Extended Play	Kismet Records
2002	Virsa	Kismet Records
2003	Mixtape Vol.1	Soldier Sound Recordings
2004	Mixtape Vol.2	Soldier Sound Recordings
2005	Bhang Goes Tha Riddim	soldier Sound Recordings
2005	American Jugni – Bikram Singh	Soldier Sound Recordings / VIP Records
2006	The Movement Vol.1	Soldier Sound Recordings
2007	The Rhyme Book – Blitzkrieg	Soldier Sound Recordings / VIP Urban
2008	Balle! Shava! Single	Nachural Records
2009	Mystics, Martyrs & Maharajas	Nachural Records
2012	The Millions	MovieBox/T-Series
2014	Drama Dream	MovieBox/Speed Records
2016	Ik Saheliyaan	MovieBox/Speed Records

=== Songs ===
Year	Track	Record label
2000	"Nachna Onda Nei"	Kismet Records
2013	"Digi-Bhang"	Soldier Sound Recordings
2014	"Att Goriye" (Preet Harpal)	Lokhdun Punjabi
2015	"Swag Jatt Da" (Ranjit Bawa)	T-Series
2015	"Zaalim Dilli" (Jazzy B)	T-Series
2015	"Chakkwein Suit" (Kulwinder Billa)	T-Series
2015	"Husn: The Kali" (Harbhajan Mann)	Amar Audio
2015	"Koi Khaas" (Saini Surinder)	MovieBox
2015	"Singhan Di Jeep" (K. S. Makhan)	Dharam Seva Records
2015	"Sitarey" (Jaz Dhami)	T-Series
2015	"Girl Like You" (Nirmal Sidhu)	AK Music
2015	"Ikk Ikk Saah" (Harbhajan Mann)	Saga Hits
2015	"Honda" (Gippy Grewal)	Panj-Aab Records
2015	"Under The Stars" (Ishmeet Narula)	AK Music
2016	"2 Akhiyaan" (Ricky Chohan)	T-Series
2016	"Gabhroo" (Sarbjit Cheema)	Kamlee Records LTD/T-Series
2016	"Bad Company" (Ranjit Bawa)	Speed Records
2016	"300 Sala Yaad Shaheedi" (Ranjit Bawa & Veer Rahimpuri)	SGPC, Amritsar
2016	"Nakhro" (Anmol Gagan Maan)	T-Series
2016	"Alvidaa" (Raj Ranjodh)	T-Series
2016	"Sucha Soorma" (Nav Sidhu)	Amar Audio
2016	"Drumbeat" (Nishawn Bhullar)	Panj-Aab Records
2016	"Sher" (Harbhajan Mann)	T-Series
2016	"Chamkila Boliyan" (Nav Sidhu & Ishmeet Naula)	MovieBox
2017	"Dagga Dhol Utte" (Raja Baath)	Speed Records
2017	"Saah Te Sajjan" (Rana Sahota)	Speed Records
2017	"Dil Di Reejh" (Harshdeep Kaur)	T-Series
