= Sirphire =

- Film poster
- Directed by: Harjit Singh Ricky
- Produced by: Gurpreet Singh Sidhu; Speed Records
- Starring: Preet Harpal; Roshan Prince; Monica Bedi; Priyanshu Chatterjee; Karamjit Anmol; Gurleen Chopra; Harwant Brar Mojukhera
- Cinematography: Sameer Shrivastava
- Music by: Jatinder Shah
- Distributed by: White Hill Studios
- Release date: 10 August 2012
- Country: India
- Language: Punjabi

Sirphire is a 2012 Punjabi film directed by Harjit Ricky. It was released on 10 August 2012 and was choreographed by Tejas Dattani.

== Story ==
The film follows six friends, including Priyanshu Chatterjee as the son of a rich Punjabi businessman, and Monica Bedi as his love interest. When the group must deal with an evil and corrupt policeman, they realize how invaluable their friendship is.

== Cast ==
- Priyanshu Chatterjee as Inder
- Monica Bedi as Simran
- Preet Harpal as Preet
- Roshan Prince as Bittu
- Binnu Dhillon as Happy
- Karamjit Anmol as Kala
- Gurleen Chopra as Jazz

Sirphire (Music Album)

Soundtrack album by Jatinder Shah
- Released: 27 July 2012
- Genre: Film soundtrack
- Length: 46:42
- Label: Speed Records
- Producer: Gurpreet Singh Sidhu

== Soundtrack ==
All music is composed by Jatinder Shah with some additional tracks by Amdad Ali.

Sirphire
No.	Title	Singer	Length
1.	"Patang"	Master Saleem & Sunidhi Chauhan
2.	"Look/Lak"	Roshan Prince
3.	"Gaani"	Preet Harpal
4.	"Chamkila"	Roshan Prince
5.	"Bhuchal"	Lehmber Hussainpuri
6.	"Sirphire"	Preet Harpal
7.	"Jhanjar Gurlej"	Roshan Prince & Gurlej Akhtar
8.	"Look/Lak (Unplugged)"	Roshan Prince
9.	"Patang (Remix)"	Master Saleem & Sunidhi Chauhan
10.	"Jhanjar"	Roshan Prince & Jaspinder Narula
11.	"Gabru"	Preet Harpal feat. Tigerstyle
