= Preet Harpal =

Indian singer, songwriter, actor (born 1983)

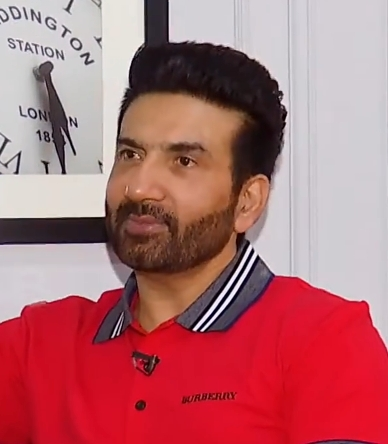

Background information
- Born: Harpal Singh; March 31, 1983 (age 43); Gurdaspur, Punjab, India
- Genres: Bhangra, pop, hip-hop
- Occupations: Punjabi singer, actor, writer, Lyricist
- Website: www.preetharpal.com

"Preet" Harpal Singh (born 31 March 1983) is an Indian singer-songwriter and actor associated with Punjabi music and films. He is known for his song "Yaar Berozgaar" (2016) and his lead role in the film Sirphire (2012).

== Career ==
Harpal made his debut with album Hasle Vairne Hasle in 1999. His second album Begane Taan Begane Hunde Ne makes vocals of Sad Love songs. In his acting career he debuted with film Sirphire His first film is Sirphire starring himself and Gurleen Chopra, Monica Bedi, Roshan Prince which was released in 2010. He acted in the 2015 film Myself Pendu with Satinder Satti, Jaswinder Bhalla and Upasana Singh.

== Discography ==
Release	Album	Record label	Music
2022	Majhail Jatt	T-Series	
2021	Hostel	T-Series	
2020	Rabb vs Insaan	T-Series	
2020	College	T-Series	Nick Dhammu
2020	Thaath	T-Series	Beat Minister
2020	Jawaani Jaaneman	T-Series	Prem-Hardeep
2019	Saath	T-Series	Jaymeet
2019	Fateh	T-Series	Harj Nagra
2019	Pink Suit	T-Series	Ikky
2018	Clinder	T-Series	Jaymeet
2018	Kurta	T-Series	Jaymeet
2018	Lehnga	T-Series	Jaymeet
2018	Sat Guru Nanak	T-Series	Jaymeet
2018	Queen Banja	T-Series	Harry Anand
2018	Rubber band (Super Hit)	T-Series	DJ Flow
2017	Haan Kargi	T-Series	DJ Flow
2017	Pagg Wali Selfie	T-Series	Beat Minister
2016	Tann (Single)	T-Series	Dr Zeus
2016	Wang - (Super Hit)	T-Series	Dr Zeus
2016	Case (Album)	T-Series	Deep Jandu/ Beat minister
2016	Yaar berozgar (Single)	T-Series	Jatinder Shah
2015	Bewafa (Single)	T-Series	Kuwar Virk
2015	Kangna (Single)	T-Series	Kuwar Virk
2014	Waqt (The Time)	T-Series	Various
2014	Black Suit (Feat: Fateh) - Single	T-Series	Dr Zeus
2014	Att Goriye (Feat: Hard Kaur)- Single	Lokdhun Punjabi	Tigerstyle
2014	Goodbye - Single	Daddy Mohan Records	Tigerstyle
2014	Bhagat Singh - Single	Speed Records	Tigerstyle
2013	Bijli (PTC Star Night)	PTC Motion Pictures	Aman Hayer
2013	The Gambler	Yash Raj	Preet Harpal
2013	Raah (Single)	Speed records	Wilson
2011	Saturday Nights	MovieBox/Speed Records	Various
2010	Ve Mahi - Duo Collaboration (Jukebox)	MovieBox	Jeeti
2009	The Lock Up	MovieBox/StarMakers	Yo Yo Honey Singh
2008	Safar- Still on the Way	MovieBox/Speed Records	Ravi Bal
2006	Teriyan Adavaan	MovieBox/Speed Records	Ravi Bal
2004	Kehra Saada Naa Ni Jaanda	Tips	Vicky, B 21
2002	Mundey Sardaran De	Tips	Kuljeet
2001	Begane Taan Begane Hunde Ne	T-Series	Ravi Bal
1997	Hasle Vairne Hasle	Sur-Sangam	Madan Shonki

== Filmography ==
Release	Film	Role	Notes	Music	Label[bumbal b production]
2019	Lukan Michi			Jatinder Shah	
2015	Myself Pendu	Preet	4 September 2015	Jaidev Kumar	T-Series
2012	Sirphire	Preet	Lead Role - 10 August 2012	Sukshinder Shinda, Will Sadak	Speed Records
