= Aksel Rykkvin =

Norwegian singer (born 2003)

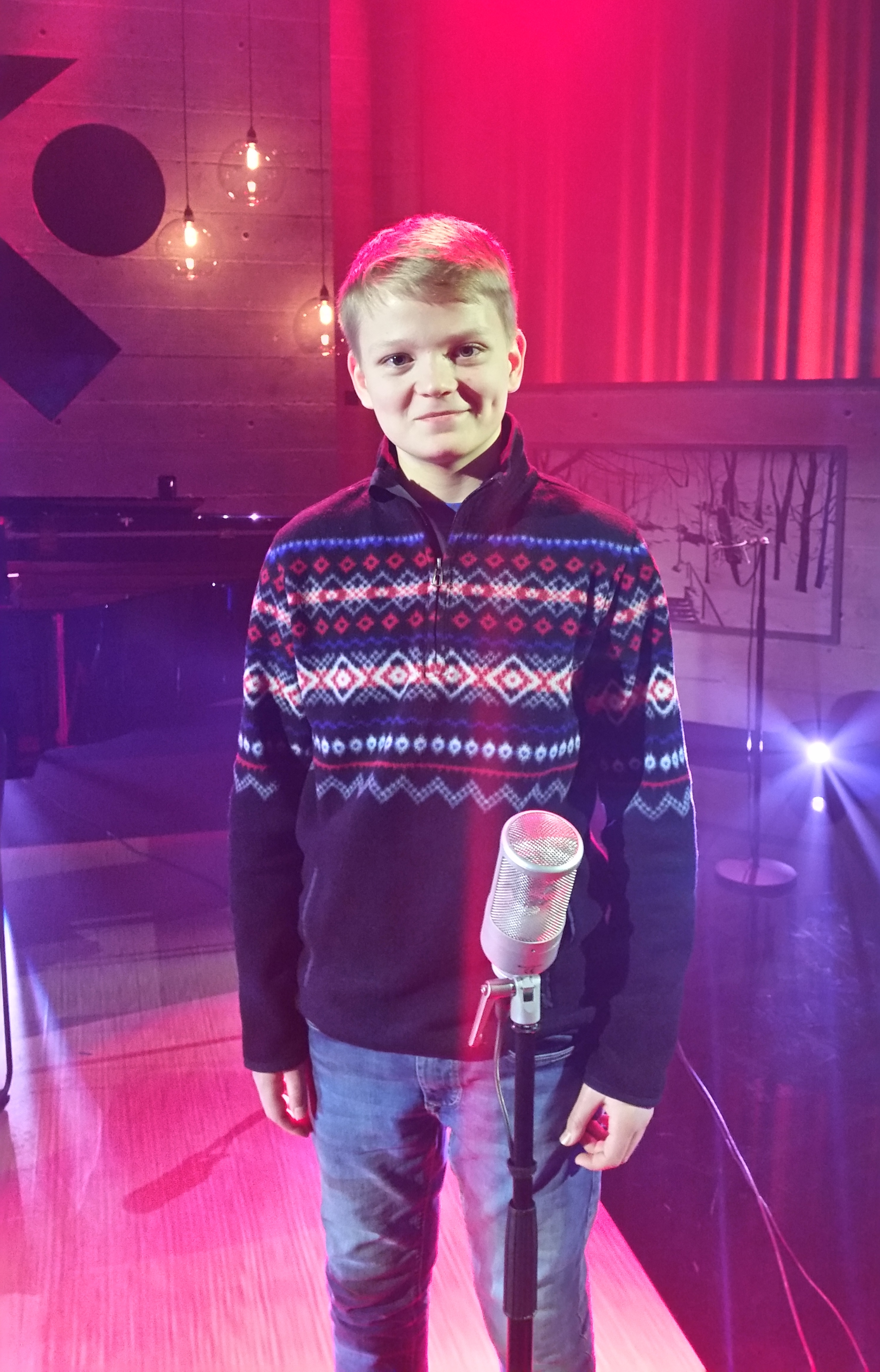
- Rykkvin in 2017

Background information
- Born: Aksel Johannes Skramstad Rykkvin; 11 April 2003 (age 23); Oslo, Norway
- Genre: Classical music
- Occupation: Singer
- Website: www.akselrykkvin.com

Aksel Johannes Skramstad Rykkvin (born 11 April 2003) is a Norwegian singer. He rose to fame as a boy soprano singing baroque arias, and recorded two albums on Signum Records with orchestral accompaniment. Critics have noted his fine vocal tone and instinctive musicality.

After his voice changed, he started performing as a baritone.. Beginning in 2022, he studied for a Bachelor of Music degree in Voice at the Royal Academy of Music, London.

== Biography ==
Rykkvin began singing in the Oslo Cathedral Boys' Choir, and continued as a member throughout his soprano career. At age ten he joined the Children's Chorus of the Norwegian National Opera and Ballet. As a member of the Oslo Cathedral Boys' Choir, he received vocal training beginning at the age of five from the voice teacher Helene Haarr. At age ten he studied voice with Marianne Willumsen Lewis, as his principal teacher. From 2019, he studied with the voice teacher Matthew Mark Marriott. Since 2022, he is studying under Prof. Mark Wildman at the Royal Academy of Music in London.

Rykkvin has an international reputation, both for his album Aksel! Arias By Bach, Händel & Mozart (2016), for which he was nominated for newcomer of the year at the 2016 Spellemannprisen, and for solo concerts and opera roles as a boy soprano. In January 2017 he was named "The Musician of the Year" during the national part of the Youth Music Championship 2016–2017. In addition to performing in operas he sang with the Oslo Philharmonic orchestra, and has also performed for the Prime Minister and Norwegian royal family.

As a baritone, Rykkvin won 2nd prize overall, and the Norma Procter Song Prize, at the 2023 Kathleen Ferrier Society Bursary for Young Singers competition.

== Recordings ==
His first album was funded with a Kickstarter campaign, raising nearly $45,000. It was recorded in London in January 2016 with the Orchestra of the Age of Enlightenment, conductor Nigel Short and producer Sean Lewis.

His second album, Light Divine, features the Norwegian Min Ensemble led by trumpeter Mark Bennett, and baroque music by Handel, Albinoni and Rameau. His voice changed a month after the recording and he then stopped performing as a soprano.

His first two albums both debuted in the Top 10 in the UK Classical Music charts.

== Discography ==
- 2016: Aksel! Arias by Bach, Handel & Mozart
- 2018: Light Divine
