= Jaz Dhami =

British-Indian musician

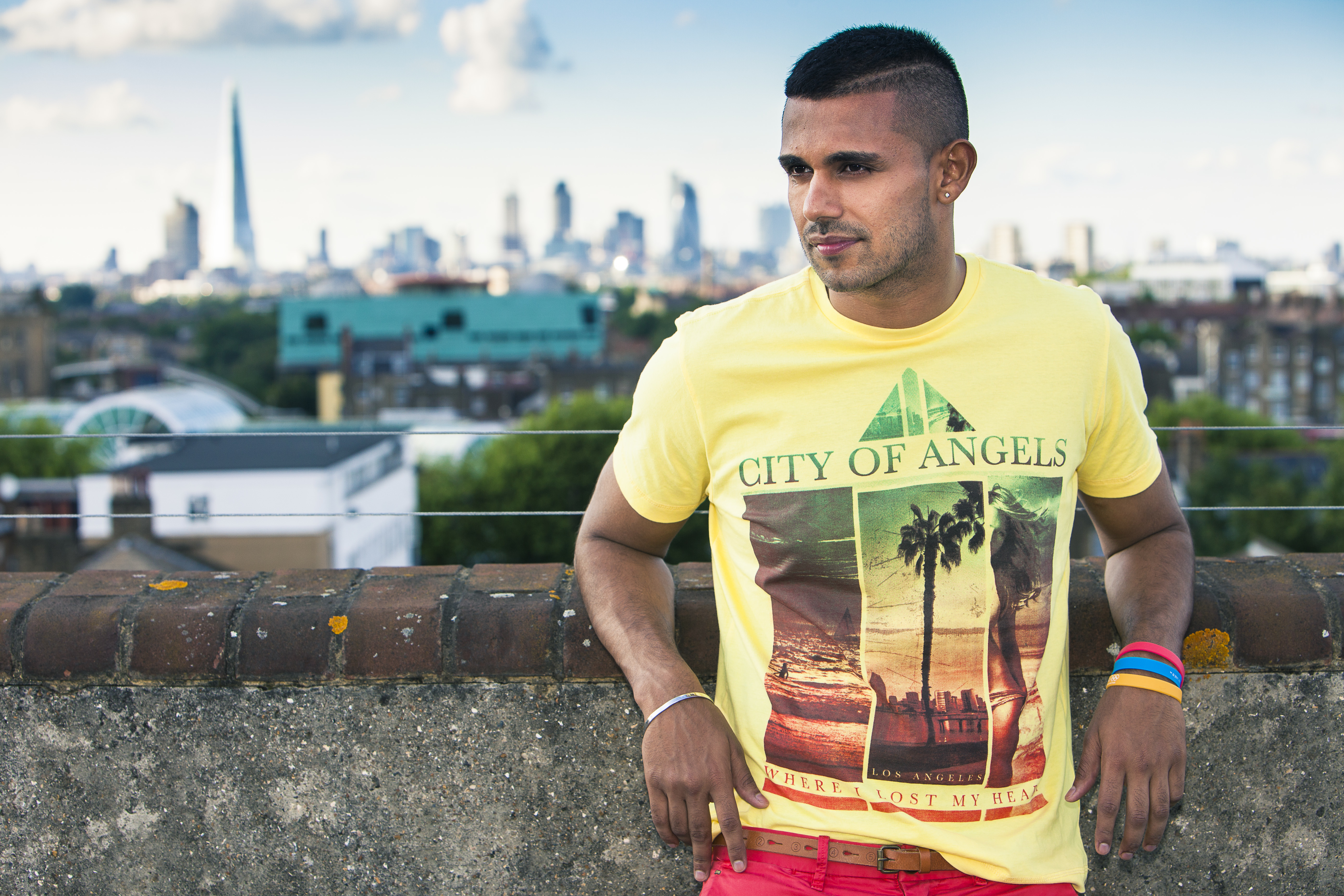
- Jaz Dhami (credits Zulfa Reprise)

Background information
- Born: Jaswinder Singh Dhami; 1 March 1989 (age 36); UK
- Genres: Bhangra, hip hop
- Occupations: singer, composer, music producer, performer
- Instrument: Guitarist
- Years active: 2008–present
- Labels: Verve-music, T-Series and Sanchez Productions Zee Music Company

Jaswinder Singh Dhami (born 1 March 1989), better known as Jaz Dhami, is a British-Indian playback singer, music producer, and performer.

== Discography ==
=== Albums ===
- 2008: Groundshaker 2 (featured by Aman Hayer)
- 2009: JD
- 2012: Jakara (Music: Gurmeet Singh)
- 2018: Pieces Of Me

=== Singles ===
- 2008: Roj Miliye
- 2009: Theke Wali
- 2009: Tera Mera
- 2010: Bari Der
- 2011: Tere Naal
- 2012: Sardari (Jakara & Music by Gurmeet Singh)
- 2012: High Heels ft. Yo Yo Honey Singh
- 2013: Meh Punjabi Boli Ah
- 2013: Zulfa ft. Dr Zeus
- 2014: Zulfa Reprise ft. Dr Zeus
- 2014: "God Only Knows" (BBC Music) featuring Stevie Wonder, Pharrell Williams, Emeli Sande, Elton John, Kylie Minogue, One Direction, Sam Smith, Chris Martin, Brian Wilson, Eliza Carthy, Nicola Benedetti, Jools Holland, Brian May, Jake Bugg, Katie Derham, Lauren Laverne, Gareth Malone, Alison Balsom, Zane Lowe, Paloma Faith, Chrissie Hynde, Jamie Cullum, Baaba Maal, Danielle de Niese, Dave Grohl
- 2014: Pasina ft Sneakbo & Ikka [Steel Banglez]
- 2015: Beparwaiyan
- 2015: Beparwaiyan Refix ft. Dr Zeus & Fateh
- 2015: Sithneyan ft. Aman Hayer
- 2015: Sitarey Tigerstyle ft. Jaz Dhami
- 2015: Munda Like Me
- 2016: Bhangra Machine ft. PBN
- 2016: Teri Ah
- 2017: Desi Girls Do It Better with Raool
- 2017: Oye Hoye Oye Hoye
- 2017: Oye Hoye Oye Hoye (Desi Mix)
- 2017 : Jean Teri featuring Raftaar (rapper), Deep Kalsi
- 2017 : Kurti Mal Mal di featuring Kanika Kapoor, Tigerstyle, Shortie Littlelox
- 2018 : So Simple
- 2018 : Shehzada
- 2018 : Cyclone
- 2022 : Bas ft. Karan Aujla (music by Yeah Proof)
- 2024 : Aad Sach - Jaz Dhami & Jasleen Kaur | Purab Mubarak Season 1

=== Bollywood ===
Year	Film	Song	Co-singer(s)	Music	Writer(s)
2016	Sanam Re	"Humne Pee Rakhi Hai"	Neha Kakkar, Ikka Singh	Epic Bhangra	Kumaar, Ikka
2016	Ki & Ka	"High Heels Te Nache"	Aditi Singh Sharma, Yo Yo Honey Singh	Meet Bros, Yo Yo Honey Singh	Kumaar, Yo Yo Honey Singh
2024	Yudhra	"Sohni Lagdi"	Sonna Rele	Prem-Hardeep	Raj Ranjodh

== Awards ==
- Best Newcomer 2009 – UK Asian Music Awards
- Best Male Act 2010 – Brit Asia TV Music Awards
- Best Desi Act 2011 – UK Asian Music Awards
- Best song of 2012 – PTC Awards (Punjabi Television Awards)
- Best Male Act 2013 – Brit Asia TV Music Awards
- Best Single 2014 for "Zulfa" – Brit Asia TV Music Awards
- Best Bollywood Song 2016 – PTC Awards (Punjabi Television Awards)

== Community work ==
Jaz Dhami is involved in encouraging Asians to get into football and is featured in The Football Association's "Football Needs" campaign.
