= One Voice (Andrew Johnston album) =

Studio album by Andrew Johnston
- Released: 29 September 2008
- Recorded: 2008
- Genre: Classical crossover
- Length: 35:17
- Label: Syco
- Producer: Nigel Wright

One Voice is the debut album by Scottish boy soprano Andrew Johnston, who rose to fame in 2008 after his appearance on the second series of Britain's Got Talent. The album was released on 29 September 2008 by Syco Music, Britain's Got Talent judge Simon Cowell's record label. Recorded in London, the album features both classical and popular songs, some of which had been previously performed by Johnston, including a duet with Faryl Smith. Johnston made a number of media appearances to publicise the album's launch, and appeared in his hometown of Carlisle on the day of the release, where the album sold out. Upon release, One Voice debuted at number five in the British album charts, finishing the week at number four. It also charted in Ireland, reaching number six. Critics responded positively to the album, favourably comparing Johnston to Aled Jones, and One Voice was rated gold in the UK.

== Background ==
Johnston first rose to fame when he tried out for the second series of reality show Britain's Got Talent. Johnston reached the final, held on 31 May 2008, and finished in third place. Despite this, it was announced that he had been signed by judge Simon Cowell's label Syco Music in June, and that his debut album would be released in late 2008. It was on the show that Johnston first performed a rendition of "Pie Jesu", later described as "the song that made him famous", as well as a cover of Eric Clapton's "Tears in Heaven". Both of these songs were recorded for One Voice, and so was a duet of "Walking in the Air" with fellow contestant Faryl Smith, first performed on the Britain's Got Talent Live Tour.

== Recording and release ==
The album was recorded immediately after Johnston finished the Britain's Got Talent live tour over a six-week period in London. The track listing, which contained both religious and popular songs, was chosen by Cowell; Johnston said "I hadn't sung many of the tracks before. But I knew them all and, anyway, I like a challenge." Johnston described recording the album as "great", and said "All I’ve ever wanted to do is go into a studio and record an album and it was everything I’ve ever dreamed of." Johnson recorded "Walking in the Air" as a duet with fellow Britain's Got Talent contestant Faryl Smith. The recording was finished by September 2008, after which Johnston began to make appearances to publicise the release, including appearances on GMTV, Channel 5 News, BBC Breakfast, This Morning and Radio 2's Friday Night Is Music Night. Johnston received vocal training from Yvie Burnett, and with whom Smith trained during Britain's Got Talent. The album was produced by Nigel Wright.

The release of One Voice was highly anticipated, and demand was so great that it charted on both Amazon's pre-sales chart and the easy listening chart before its release. The album was released on 29 September, later than first announced, and was Syco's first release in the fourth quarter. Johnston made an appearance at the city-centre Woolworths store in his home town of Carlisle to celebrate the album launch on 1 October, and spoke to reporters for the local paper The Cumberland News, saying "I am really grateful to my local supporters and it is great to take part in my first signing here in Carlisle." In February 2009, the album was released in South Korea.

== Reception and performance ==
Critics responded positively to the album. Writing for the United Kingdom's Daily Express, Robert Spellman said that "anyone missing Aled Jones since nature had its way will lap up Andrew's butter-wouldn't-melt renditions of Pie Jesu, Agnus Dei and One Voice." Kate Leaver, writing for South Korea's JoongAng Daily, said Johnston "has truer talent than hoards of his musical elders" and that "the vulnerability of this One Voice makes for a haunting musical experience."

One Voice entered the UK Album Chart at number five, and finished the week at number four. It stayed in the top 75 for five weeks. Demand for the album in Johnston's local area was so great that many Carlisle stores had sold out of the album the day after its release. In an interview published in the Daily Record, Johnston said "Thanks to everyone that has bought the album. You've made my dreams come true". The album has sold over 120,000 copies, and was rated gold in the UK. Johnston was presented a gold disk by Penny Smith, and said that "it was such a surprise to see how well the album did". The album also charted in the Irish Album Charts, entering at ten, peaking at six and spending a total of seven weeks in the top 75.

== Credits ==
=== Choir ===
- London Lads – Chorus
- London Oratory School Schola – Chorus
- Anne Skates – Vocal Arrangement, vocal contractor, children's choirmaster
- Lee Ward – Children's choirmastering
- Sebastian Budner – Choir coordination
- Joan Lane – Choir coordination

=== Music ===
- Sylvia Addison – Orchestra contracting
- Pete Murray – Arrangement
- Rolf Wilson – Orchestra leading
- Nigel Wright – Arrangement, conducting

=== Production and publicity ===
- Dave Arch – arranger
- Joanna Baker – Music preparation
- John Baker – Music preparation
- Dick Beetham – Mastering
- Robin Sellars – Engineering
- Josh Blair – Assistant engineering
- Paula Chandler – Digital editing
- Paul Chandler – Digital editing
- Yann McCullough – Digital and vocal editing
- Yvie Burnette – Vocal production and coaching
- Sarah Payne – Personal assistance
- Nigel Wright – Production
- Simon Fowler – Photography

== Track listing ==
No.	Title	Writer(s)	Length
1.	"Pie Jesu" (From Requiem)	Andrew Lloyd Webber	3:24
2.	"Make Me a Channel of Your Peace"	Sebastian Temple	3:57
3.	"Walking in the Air" (From The Snowman)	Howard Blake	3:15
4.	"Panis angelicus"	César Franck	3:17
5.	"Tears in Heaven"	Eric Clapton and Will Jennings	3:18
6.	"Agnus Dei" (Arranged from the second movement of Adagio for Strings)	Samuel Barber	6:46
7.	"One Voice"	Barry Manilow	2:32
8.	"Goin' Home" (Adapted from "The New World Symphony")	Antonín Dvořák and William Arms Fisher	3:06
9.	"Imagine"	John Lennon	2:47
10.	"I Have a Dream"	Benny Andersson and Björn Ulvaeus	2:55
Total length:			35:17
