= Nachna Onda Nei =

Single by Tigerstyle featuring Kaka Bhaniawala

from the album The Rising
- Released: 1 January 2000
- Recorded: 1999
- Genre: Bhangra
- Length: 6:17
- Label: Kismet Records
- Songwriter(s): Michael Jackson, David Bowie, John Deacon, Brian May, Freddie Mercury, Roger Taylor
- Producer(s): Tigerstyle

Nachna Onda Nei (Punjabi: ਨਚਣਾ ਓੰਦਾ ਨਹੀਂ, نچنا اوندا نہیں) is a song by Scottish bhangra group Tigerstyle with Kaka Bhaniawala on lead vocals. It is a mash-up of "Billie Jean" by Michael Jackson and "Under Pressure" by Queen ft. David Bowie with new bhangra-style instruments and Punjabi vocals being sung over the top. The song also uses a sample of "Fantastic Voyage" by Coolio (which itself relies heavily on samples from "Fantastic Voyage" by Lakeside).

While never formally released as a single, it made #62 on the UK Singles Chart in 2008, after being used in performances by Signature in the talent show Britain's Got Talent.
