= Labh Janjua =

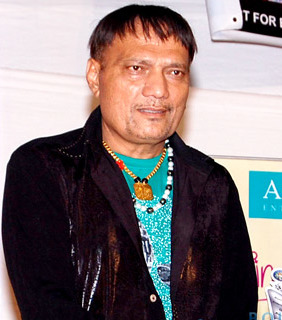
- Labh Janjua in 2014

Background information
- Born: 1957
- Origin: Khanna Punjab, India
- Died: 22 October 2015 (aged 58) Mumbai, India
- Occupations: Singer, songwriter

Labh Janjua (1957 – 22 October 2015) was an Indian bhangra vocalist and songwriter, best known for his bhangra and hip hop songs, such as "Bair Bura Hunda Jatt da", "Jatt Di Nazar Buri", "Goli Jatt Ne Katcheri'ch Chaloni ", "Jatt Marda", "Soni De Nakhre Sone lagde" (movie Partner) and "Mundian To Bach Ke", which was produced by Panjabi MC in 1998, and re-released in 2002. He has also sung many Bollywood songs, including "Jee Karda" from the 2008 film Singh Is Kinng and "London Thumakda" from the 2014 film Queen which was one of his most successful songs.

== Biography ==
=== Early life and education ===
Janjua was born in a Jat Sikh family. He learned music by attending kirtans by his grandfather and he won several prizes for singing in school and college. He is an Alumnus of Mata Gujri College, Fatehgarh Sahib.

He was born and brought up in village Majra, Khanna in the Ludhiana district of Punjab, India. He was a resident of both Mumbai and Khanna City, where he learned music under a well-known local teacher, late Jaswant Bhanwra.

=== Career ===
He first shot to fame in 1999, where he provided vocals for the song "Mundian To Bach Ke", which was produced by Panjabi MC and was a huge hit. His Bollywood break appeared in 2007, in the movie Hattrick. Since then he sang numerous songs in movies like Partner, Dev.D, Singh Is Kinng, Garam Masala, Dhol, Krazzy 4 and Singh Is Bliing.

=== Death ===
Labh was found dead at his Goregaon residence on the morning of 22 October 2015. While the cause of his death was not known, Bangunagar police ruled that his death was neither a suicide or murder and no foul play was detected. Labh was known to suffer from diabetes-related problems, and his body was sent to Bhagwati Hospital for a post-mortem examination.

== Discography ==
=== Albums ===
- Hulchul Hogi
- Raatan Toon Lambe Khat
- Bewafa
- Beyond Belief
- Bair Bura Hunda Jatt Da
- Labh Janjua – The King
- Beware of the Boys
- Labh Janjua Live (2 Packs) CD and DVD

=== Singles and collaborations ===
- 1998 / 2002 – "Mundian To Bach Ke" produced by Punjabi MC
- 2008 – "Glastonbury" with Jay-Z
- 2015 - Gora Gora Rang featuring Notorious Jatt

=== Playback singing ===
- "Ishq Da Current" in Prakash Electronic (2017)
- "Heeriye" in Vodka Diaries (2017)
- "Dil Kare Chu Che" in Singh Is Bliing (2015)
- "Jawaani Din Char" in Second Hand Husband (2015)
- "Thoda Lutf Thoda Ishq" in Thoda Lutf Thoda Ishq (2015)
- "London Thumakada" in Queen (2014)
- "Farukha Baadi" in Luv Shuv Tey Chicken Khurana (2012)
- "Baari barsi" in Band Baaja Baaraat (2010)
- "Jee Karda" and "Talli Hua" in Singh Is Kinng (2008)
- "Dance pe Chance" with Sunidhi Chauhan in Rab Ne Bana Di Jodi (2008)
- "Aag lage aaj kal ke fashion nu" in Haal–e–dil (2008)
- "Pyaar Karke" in Pyaar Ke Side Effects (2006)
- "Chuuriyan" in Money Hai Toh Honey Hai (2008)
- "Ik rupiya" in Krazzy 4 (2008)
- "Man Moniye" in Dil Dosti etc (2007)
- "Chori Chori (male)" in Garam Masala (2005)
- "Mahi Mennu" in Dev.D (2009)
- "Hikknaal" in Dev.D (2009)
- "Soni De Nakhre" in Partner (2007)
- "O Yara Dhol Bajake" in Dhol (2007)
- "Mera Yaar Sharabi" in Labh Janjua Funmusic (2007)
