= Andrew Johnston (singer) =

Scottish singer (born 1994)

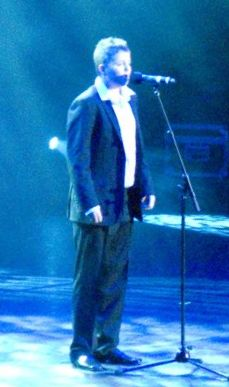
- Johnston performing in 2008

Background information
- Born: Andrew Aaron Lewis Patrick Brannock John Grieve Michael Robert Oscar Schmidt Johnston; 23 September 1994 (age 32); Dumfries, Scotland
- Genre: Classical crossover
- Occupation: Singer
- Instrument: Vocals
- Years active: 2008–09
- Label: Syco Music

Andrew Johnston (born 23 September 1994) is a Scottish former singer who rose to fame when he appeared as a boy soprano on the second series of the UK television talent show Britain's Got Talent in 2008. After finishing in third place, he received a contract to record with Syco Music, a label owned by the Britain's Got Talent judge Simon Cowell. Johnston's debut album, One Voice, was released in September of the same year, and reached number four on the UK Albums Chart and number six on the Irish Albums Chart. It was certified gold by the British Phonographic Industry, having sold 100,000 copies, in January 2009.

Johnston was born in Dumfries, Scotland, and his parents separated when he was an infant. He and his mother moved to Carlisle, where they lived in "poverty". He became head chorister at Carlisle Cathedral, and was bullied at school because of his love of classical music. After releasing One Voice, he took two years away from music due to his voice breaking, later joining the National Youth Choir. He began studying at the Royal Northern College of Music in 2013. After graduating in 2017, he worked full-time as a roofer, then went on to study at the Royal Academy of Music with intentions of a career in opera. In 2025, however, said that he had not sung for several years.

== Life and career ==
=== Early life and Carlisle Cathedral Choir ===
Johnston was born on 23 September 1994 in Dumfries, Scotland, the son of Andrew Johnston and Morag Brannock. He was given the extensive name Andrew Aaron Lewis Patrick Brannock John Grieve Michael Robert Oscar Schmidt Johnston. Johnston's parents separated when he was eight months old, and from that time he lived with his mother and three older siblings in Carlisle, Cumbria, in the north of England, where he attended Trinity School. Johnston tried out for Carlisle Cathedral Choir at the age of six at the recommendation of Kim Harris, a teacher at his primary school. He was auditioned by the choirmaster Jeremy Suter and accepted into the choir at the age of seven. Johnston's mother, who had no previous association with the cathedral, described her feelings of being overwhelmed by emotion at having her boy singing in such a "stunning building among those extraordinary voices". His mother also described Johnston's busy regimen of practice four times a week and all day Sundays, saying that it took up all of their spare time. However, she said that the cathedral staff became like a family to her son, and that "it was such a lovely, safe, close feeling for him". Johnston, who attended Trinity School, was subject to abuse and threats from bullies which drove him to contemplate quitting the choir, but he was helped through the ordeal by his choirmaster and the dean and canons of the cathedral. By the time of his participation in Britain's Got Talent, Johnston was head chorister.

In September 2008, after his appearance on Britain's Got Talent but before the release of his first album, Johnston embarked on a tour of Norway with the choir, performing at Stavanger Cathedral and Utstein Abbey, among other places. The tour was conceived because the Diocese of Stavanger is connected with the Diocese of Carlisle through the Partnership for World Mission. This was Johnston's last tour with the choir. Johnston features as head chorister on one of the choir's albums, The Choral Music of F.W Wadely, released in November 2008.

=== Britain's Got Talent ===
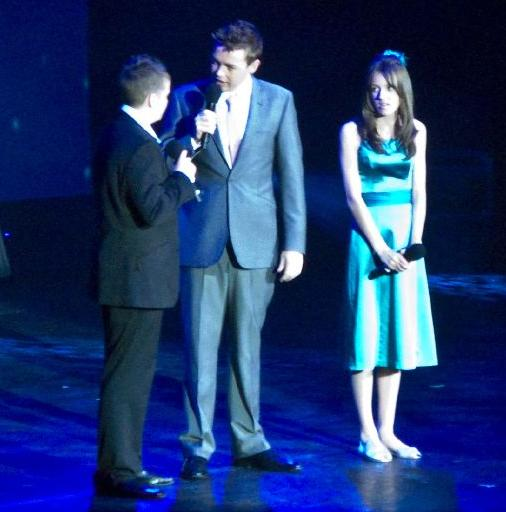
Johnston (left) with Faryl Smith and Stephen Mulhern on the Britain's Got Talent Live Tour

Johnston was entered as a competitor in the second series of Britain's Got Talent by his mother. He passed the first public audition, singing "Pie Jesu" from Andrew Lloyd Webber's Requiem. Amanda Holden, one of the competition's judges, was brought to tears, and the audience offered Johnston a standing ovation. Johnston was tipped as the favourite to win the competition. Later, Johnston described his initial audition as daunting, saying that "it was scary singing in front of 2,500 people. I had never sang on stage before – then there was also Simon, Amanda and Piers". He won his semi-final heat on 27 May 2008, receiving the most public votes on the night and thereby qualifying for the final. He sang "Tears in Heaven" by Eric Clapton; judge Holden told him he had "a gift from God in [his] voice". At the final on 30 May, he again sang "Pie Jesu". He finished in third place, behind the winner, the street dancer George Sampson and runners-up, the dance group Signature. Johnston left the stage in tears, later saying that he "was upset. But when you see the talent that was there, it was an honour just to be in the final". The day after the final, Cowell's publicist Max Clifford said that it was "quite possible" that Cowell would be offering record contracts to some of the finalists, including Johnston. Johnston and other contestants then embarked on a national arena tour.

During his initial audition, Johnston claimed that he was bullied and victimised from the age of six because of his singing. When asked how he dealt with the issue, he stated "I carry on singing." In The Times, Johnston's success story was described as "the stuff of fairytales", as he was successful despite having been raised in "poverty". Johnston said he did not talk about being bullied because he was told to do so by producers, but "because I believed it would help people who were going through what I had gone through be stronger". Johnston has subsequently visited schools and elsewhere to help other victims of bullying. He said "I want to use my experience of bullies to help other kids".

=== One Voice ===
On 12 June 2008, while Johnston was travelling with the Britain's Got Talent Live Tour, it was announced that Johnston had signed a record deal with Syco Music, a division of Sony BMG, and that his first album would be produced after the tour. The deal was reportedly for £1 million. After signing with Syco, Johnston made public appearances, including performing at Andrew Lloyd Webber's birthday celebrations on 14 September, and at Carlisle United's Brunton Park.

Johnston's debut album, One Voice, was released on 29 September 2008. It includes a cover of "Walking in the Air", performed with Faryl Smith. The album was recorded over a six-week period in London, and the track listing was chosen by Cowell. Johnston described the recording process as "brilliant", and that it was "really good – just to be in a recording studio and meet the different people". The album debuted in the British charts at number five, and finished the week at number four. The album was later certified gold, having sold 100,000 copies, and Johnston was presented a gold disc by daytime television presenter Penny Smith. Critics responded positively to the album, with Kate Leaver, writing for the Korea JoongAng Daily, saying Johnston "has truer talent than hordes of his musical elders" and that "the vulnerability" of Johnston's performance on the album "makes for a haunting musical experience". In Music Week, the album was described as "highly-anticipated", and Johnston was called "exceptionally-talented".

After the album's release, Johnston became involved in the Sing Up campaign, appearing in schools around the country to encourage other young people to join choirs. In December 2008, Johnston made a guest appearance at Whitehaven's Christmas fair, and performed at a carol service in Bradford. Johnston was also invited to turn on the Carlisle Christmas lights and perform at the celebrations. Mike Mitchelson, of Carlisle City Council, described Johnston as "one of our local heroes".

In September 2009, Johnston announced that he would be taking a year off from singing as his voice had broken, changing him to a tenor. He had previously performed as a treble. He said "the tutors at [the Royal Northern College of Music] said they'll be able to train my voice up again. It's the same as it ever was, just deeper". Johnston's voice then changed from a tenor to a baritone. After remaining out of the spotlight for two years, he joined the National Youth Choir. In 2011, he was awarded a Royal School of Church Music Gold medal; public performances that year included a charitable concert, alongside organists John Bromley and Tony Green, at St Paul's Church, Helsby in November.

=== Adulthood ===
In September 2013, Johnston began to study for a Bachelor of Music degree at the Royal Northern College of Music, under the tutelage of Jeff Lawton, who had previously tutored him at the Junior College. He immediately joined the college's Chamber Choir and the Manchester Cathedral choir, but said that he intended to still sing with the Carlisle Cathedral choir where possible. While a student, Johnston's singing was adversely affected by a broken nose, the result of an unprovoked attack in a Carlisle nightclub on New Year's Day, 2014. He completed a degree in opera studies in 2017. He began working full time as a roofer, but continued to have singing lessons, aiming for an opera career, and was subsequently awarded a scholarship to study at the Royal Academy of Music, which he joined in 2019.

Johnston appeared before Westminster Magistrates' Court in 2022 charged with three sexual offences, dating to between November 2019 and March 2020, while he was studying at the Royal Academy. Johnston was released on bail. Appearing in Southwark Crown Court on 7 September 2022 for a pre-trial hearing, Johnston denied two charges of rape and one charge of sexual assault. The trial commenced on 24 April 2025, with Johnston maintaining his innocence. On 8 May 2025, after two days of jury deliberation, Johnston was cleared of all charges. He told the court he had "never sung a note" since the allegations were made against him.

== Personal life ==
Johnston's family home is in Stanwix, Carlisle. His mother, Morag Brannock, worked for the Office for National Statistics before giving up her job to support her son's career. Prior to his Britain's Got Talent appearances, he attended Trinity School, and later received tuition from a personal tutor. Johnston said that he "had a lot of support from local people when ... taking part in Britain's Got Talent", and was given a civic award for outstanding achievement by Carlisle City Council in March 2009.

Johnston's interests include jujitsu, in which he has a black belt. The Carlisle newspaper News and Star reported in September 2012 that Johnston had become the youngest person in the world to be granted a licence to teach the sport.

== Discography ==
Studio albums

Year	Album details	Peak chart positions		Certifications
Year	Album details	UK	IRE	Certifications
2008	One Voice: Released: 29 September 2008; Label: Syco (#88697351872); Format: CD	4	6	UK: Gold
