= Myself Pendu =

MySelf Pendu
- Directed by: Surinder Rihal
- Written by: Garry Grewal
- Produced by: Surinder Rihal
- Starring: Preet Harpal; Sayali Bhagat; Jaswinder Bhalla; Satinder Satti
- Cinematography: Harish Patel; Tejas Dattam, Shenty Kanwar, J Cee Dhanoa
- Edited by: Sarabjeet Sohal & Ramanjit Singh
- Music by: Nick Dhammu; Sham- Balkar 13 Db
- Production company: Music Box Media Entertainment Co
- Distributed by: Sur Sangam Films
- Release date: 4 September 2015
- Country: India
- Language: Punjabi

Myself Pendu is a 2015 Punjabi comedy movie from India directed by Surinder Rihal under the banner of Music Box Media Entertainment Co., released on 4 September 2015. Myself Pendu stars Preet Harpal, Sayali Bhagat and Ather Habib in lead roles.

== Plot ==
This is the story of two guys (Preet & Harpal) played by Preet Harpal & Ather Habib. They belong to a middle-class family & have a very care free attitude. They are never serious towards life & future. They keep on making schemes which can make them live a luxurious life. Their father who is Ex Sarpanch always try to teach them the facts of life so as to make them efficient & independent for at least those things which are necessary for daily life. On the other hand, their mother always supports them for whatever rubbish they do. First time Jaswinder Singh Bhalla is performing in double role. The other one is a prized gangster Kaka Bishnoi. Both of them stage plan to loot a Jeweller so that they can get arrested their father who is look alike of gangster Kaka Bishnoi and claim prize of 2.5 crores from Government. They convince their mother who further convinces their father. They also take Police inspector into confidence and make a plan. Then they went to loot jeweller where as a coincidence real gangster also come along with his gang and as already planned police arrives. In ensuing melee real gangster is arrested and the gang members take away Ex Sarpanch considering him their boss.

== Cast ==
- Preet Harpal
- Sayali Bhagat
- Satwant Kaur
- Jaswinder Bhalla
- Upasana Singh
- Ather Habib
- Satinder Satti
- Surinder Rihal
- Jaspinder Cheema... Guest Appearance
- Navraj Hans... Guest Appearances
- Madhurima Tulli... Guest Appearance

== Music ==
Music composed by Nick Dhammu and Original score composed by Gurcharan Singh. Music released on

Junglee Music.

Track list
	Title	Singer(s)
1	Pendu Ni Dillan De	Preet Harpal
2	Vyah Oh De Naal	Preet Harpal
3	Laggi Ai Jadon Di	Preet Harpal
4	Rowan Main	Shahid Mallya
5	Dil De Ramp	Preet Harpal, Navraj Hans
6	Makhani Malai	Sonu Kakkar

== Reception ==
=== Box office ===
Myself Pendu was worldwide released on 5 September 2015.

=== Critical response ===
Jasmine Singh of The Tribune termed movie as flop. ABP Sanjha also gave negative review to the movie.
