= Snake handling =

Snake handling may refer to:

- Snake handler, a person who professionally handles snakes
- Snake handling in Christianity, the religious practice involving handling snakes
