= PBN (producer) =

PBN (Punjabi By Nature)
- Born: Wolverhampton, England
- Origin: Indian descent
- Genres: Bhangra; Asian fusion
- Occupations: Electronic musician; DJ; remixer; record producer; singer
- Years active: 2003–present
- Labels: Limitless Records; Playback Records
- Formerly of: TeamPBN
- Website: www.pbnmusic.co.uk

PBN (Punjabi By Nature) not to be confused with the Canadian bhangra band Punjabi by Nature (1993–1998)

PBN or Punjabi By Nature is a UK-based Indian music producer, singer and songwriter, specialising in bhangra and Asian fusion productions, working with a great number of Desi music artists mainly based in the UK, beginning with the early 2000s. He is signed to Limitless Records and Playback Records. He has also formed TeamPBN as a collaborative project with Bambi, Raj Bains and Serena. Throughout his career, he has become well-known not only in his native UK, but in India, Europe, the Middle East, United States and Canada, Australia and, in general, the Asian music market. His productions are used extensively in night venues, DJ events and on BBC Asian Network and its weekly chart.

Originating from Wolverhampton, England, he has released around ten studio and production albums and launching / advancing the careers of many Asian musicians with definitive hits. His produced hits include "Nain Preeto De", "Aaj Me Peeni", "Jaan Panjabi", "Aashiq", "Dancefloor" and "Go Crazy". He was dubbed "The Hit Maker" of desi music. PBN was associated from his early days with Dhesi Vibes, who formed later Limitless Records and PBN signing with the label became one of its most prominent producers, starting with his album Next Episode and Settin' the Standard.

He has won the Eastern Eye awards several times. In 2010 and 2011, as a "best music producer" and, in 2011, for "Best Single" for "Fitteh Moo". In 2011, he also won UK Asian Music Awards for "Best Album" for Crowd Pleaser.

== Discography ==
=== Albums ===
- 2003: Next Episode
- 2004: Settin' the Standard
- 2005: Ready or Not
- 2009: Homegrown
- 2010: Crowd Pleaser
- 2011: Me Myself & Music
- 2013: Hitmaker – The Story So Far
- 2017: Iconic (Date TBD)

=== Collaborative / production albums ===
- 2002: Second 2 None (credited to Panjabi By Nature)
- 2004: Blazin (credited to Panjabi By Nature)
- 2005: Ounce of Desi (credited to Lil-Jay, Juttla, Jawani Project, Desi Devilz & PBN)
- 2007: Jaan Panjabi (credited to Offlicence, Karam Sandhu, DJ Rix & PBN)
- 2007: Dhola Ve Dhola (credited to Dippa Dosanjh & PBN)

=== Singles ===
(Selective)

- 2004: "Nain Preeto De"
- 2005: "Aaj Me Peeni"
- 2007: "Jaan Panjabi"
- 2009: "Aashiq"
- 2009: "Dancefloor"
- 2009: "Sohni Lagdi"
- 2010: "Kaun Nachdi"
- 2010: "Boli" (feat. Miss Pooja)
- 2010: "Gereh Kad Dee" (feat. H-Dhami)]
- 2010: "Kaun Nee Jaandah" (feat. The Dhol Foundation & Daljit Mattu)
- 2011: "Fitteh Moo"
- 2011: "Sadi Gal Hor Yah" (feat. DCS)
- 2012: "Addi Marke" (Rana Sahota feat. PBN)
- 2012: "Saa Charju" (feat. Sazi Judge)
- 2012: "Margeh Margeh" (Jevi feat. PBN)
- 2013: "Go Crazy" (feat. Miss Pooja)
- 2013: "Superstar" (with Raj Bains)
- 2013: "Zaalma" (with Bambi)
- 2014: "Phatte Chuk Di" (with Raj Bains)
- 2014: "Nath Dig Pey" (with Bambi & Raj Bains)
- 2014: "Singh" (with Jassi Sidhu)
- 2015: "Jatti Nachdi" (TeamPBN feat. PBN, Serena, Raj Bains & Bambi)
- 2015: "Thori Thori" (with Raj Bains)
- 2016: "Bhangra Machine" (Jaz Dhami feat. PBN)
- 2017: "Bhangra Paundi" (with Manpreet Toor feat. Sharky P)
- 2024: "2Much" (Rana Sahota | Taken From EP: 2Much | Co-Singer: Jasmeen Akhtar)
