= Mundian To Bach Ke =

2002 single by Panjabi MC

Single by Panjabi MC

from the album Legalised / Beware
- B-side: "Mundian Breaks"
- Released: 25 November 2002
- Studio: Birmingham, United Kingdom
- Genre: Bhangra; alternative hip hop
- Length: 3:49
- Label: Superstar; Urban; Instant Karma
- Songwriters: Panjabi MC; Labh Janjua; Glen Larson; Stu Philips
- Producer: Panjabi MC

Panjabi MC singles chronology
"Backstabbers" (2002)	"Mundian To Bach Ke" (2002)	"Jogi" (2003)

Music video
- "Mundian To Bach Ke (Beware of the Boys)" on YouTube

"Mundian To Bach Ke" (Punjabi: ਮੁੰਡਿਆਂ ਤੋਂ ਬੱਚ ਕੇ, IPA: [ˈmʊɳɖɪ(j)ãː tõː ˈbətːʃ keː]), also titled "Beware of the Boys (Mundian To Bach Ke)" or "Beware", is a bhangra music song produced by British musician Panjabi MC, with vocals and lyrics by Punjabi artist Labh Janjua. The song was recorded by Panjabi MC in Birmingham, England, for his 1998 album Legalised.

Following its release as a single in November 2002, "Mundian To Bach Ke" achieved worldwide success, topping the singles charts in Italy and Wallonia and charting highly in many other countries. A remix of the song, released in 2003 and featuring American rapper Jay-Z, also charted highly in North America and Australia. The song sold an estimated 10 million copies worldwide, making it one of the best-selling singles of all time.

== Lyrics and music ==
"Mundian To Bach Ke" (1998)
A 23-second sample of "Mundian To Bach Ke"

In addition to features of bhangra music, "Mundian To Bach Ke" also uses the bass line and part of the beat from "Fire It Up" (1997) by Busta Rhymes, which in turn is based around a sample from the television theme song for Knight Rider, written by Glen A. Larson and Stu Phillips, as an underlying element and lyrics originally written by Channi Singh. The lyrics of the song are in Punjabi. The music video for this song was shot on the streets of Kuala Lumpur, Malaysia.

== Chart performance ==
"Mundian To Bach Ke" was released as a single in Germany on 25 November 2002. It sold over 100,000 in the first two days alone and debuted at number two on the German Singles Chart. On the Italian Singles Chart, the song reached number one for three weeks. In the UK, it was issued through Instant Karma and debuted at its peak of number five on the UK Singles Chart; it was the first bhangra song to reach the UK top 10. The remix, featuring American rapper Jay-Z, also reached number 33 on the US Billboard Hot 100, number 10 in Canada, and number 12 in Australia.

The Washington Post estimated that there may have been 10 million units sold worldwide. However, given that many of these copies may have been bootlegged, an exact number is not known, though sales are at least in the millions.

== Track listings ==
German CD single

1. "Mundian To Bach Ke" (original mix) – 3:49
2. "Mundian To Bach Ke" (Moonbootica mix) – 6:41
3. "Mundian To Bach Ke" (Banks & Sullivan Oldskool mix) – 4:39
4. "Mundian To Bach Ke" (instrumental mix) – 4:43

French CD single

1. "Mundian To Bach Ke" (original radio edit) – 3:24
2. "Mundian To Bach Ke" (Motivo Hi-Lectro radio edit) – 3:25

UK CD single

1. "Mundian To Bach Ke" (radio edit) – 3:20
2. "Mundian To Bach Ke" (Switch mix) – 6:19
3. "Mundian Breaks" – 3:56

UK 12-inch single

A1. "Mundian To Bach Ke" (main mix) – 4:02
B1. "Mundian To Bach Ke" (Switch mix) – 6:19
B2. "Mundian Breaks" – 3:56

UK cassette single

1. "Mundian To Bach Ke" (main mix) – 4:02
2. "Mundian Breaks" – 3:56

US CD single and 12-inch single 1

1. "Beware of the Boys (Mundian To Bach Ke)" (Jay-Z remix)
2. "Beware of the Boys (Mundian To Bach Ke)" (original version)
3. "Beware Breaks (Mundian Breaks)"

US 12-inch single 2

A1. "Beware of the Boys (Mundian To Bach Ke)" (radio edit)
A2. "Beware Breaks (Mundian Breaks)"
B1. "Beware of the Boys (Mundian To Bach Ke)" (Switch mix)

US 12-inch single 3

A1. "Beware of the Boys (Mundian To Bach Ke)" (Twista remix)
A2. "Beware of the Boys (Mundian To Bach Ke)" (original version)
B1. "Beware Breaks (Mundian Breaks)"

Australian CD single

1. "Mundian To Bach Ke (Beware of the Boys)" (Jay-Z remix radio edit) – 3:00
2. "Mundian To Bach Ke (Beware of the Boys)" (original radio edit) – 3:21
3. "Mundian To Bach Ke (Beware of the Boys)" (Triple X remix) – 7:53
4. "Mundian To Bach Ke (Beware of the Boys)" (Motiva Hi-Lectro mix) – 5:40
5. "Beware Breaks (Mundian Breaks)" – 3:56

== Charts ==
=== Weekly charts ===
"Mundian To Bach Ke"

Chart (2002–2003)	Peak position
Austria (Ö3 Austria Top 40)	2
Belgium (Ultratop 50 Flanders)	3
Belgium (Ultratop 50 Wallonia)	1
Denmark (Tracklisten)	5
Europe (Eurochart Hot 100)	3
Finland (Suomen virallinen lista)	12
France (SNEP)	15
Germany (GfK)	2
Greece (IFPI)	1
Hungary (Rádiós Top 40)	20
Hungary (Single Top 40)	1
Ireland (IRMA)	14
Ireland Dance (IRMA)	2
Italy (FIMI)	1
Netherlands (Dutch Top 40)	13
Netherlands (Single Top 100)	10
Norway (VG-lista)	18
Romania (Romanian Top 100)	12
Scottish Singles Sales (Official Charts)	12
Spain (Promusicae)	15
Sweden (Sverigetopplistan)	10
Switzerland (Schweizer Hitparade)	4
UK Singles (Official Charts)	5
UK Dance (Official Charts)	2
UK Indie (Official Charts)	1
UK Hip Hop/R&B (Official Charts)	1

"Beware of the Boys" (featuring Jay-Z)

Chart (2003)	Peak position
Australia (ARIA)	12
Australian Urban (ARIA)	5
Canada (Nielsen SoundScan)	10
US Billboard Hot 100	33
US Dance Singles Sales (Billboard)	3
US Hot R&B/Hip-Hop Singles & Tracks (Billboard)	21
US Rhythmic Top 40 (Billboard)	17

=== Year-end charts ===
"Mundian To Bach Ke"

Chart (2003)	Position
Austria (Ö3 Austria Top 40)	20
Belgium (Ultratop 50 Flanders)	23
Belgium (Ultratop 50 Wallonia)	23
France (SNEP)	80
Germany (Media Control GfK)	35
Italy (FIMI)	10
Netherlands (Single Top 100)	88
Romania (Romanian Top 100)	43
Sweden (Hitlistan)	64
Switzerland (Schweizer Hitparade)	33
UK Singles (OCC)	73

"Beware of the Boys" (featuring Jay-Z)

Chart (2003)	Position
Australia (ARIA)	99
US Dance Singles Sales (Billboard)	11
US Hot R&B/Hip-Hop Singles & Tracks (Billboard)	98
US Rhythmic Top 40 (Billboard)	94

== Certifications ==
Region	Certification	Certified units/sales
Belgium (BRMA)	Gold	25,000^{*}
Germany (BVMI)	Platinum	500,000^{‡}
Greece (IFPI Greece)	Gold	10,000^{^}
Switzerland (IFPI Switzerland)	Gold	20,000^{^}
United Kingdom (BPI)	Silver	200,000^{‡}
^{*} Sales figures based on certification alone.^{^} Shipments figures based on certification alone.^{‡} Sales+streaming figures based on certification alone.

== Release history ==
Region	Date	Format(s)	Label(s)	Ref.
Germany	25 November 2002	CD	Superstar; Urban	
United Kingdom	13 January 2003	12-inch vinyl; CD; cassette	Instant Karma	
Australia	9 June 2003	CD	Ministry of Sound	

== In popular culture ==
- It was used on an episode of ER, when Gallant and Neela danced to a version of the song, which Gallant called a "Sikh rap".
- "Mundian To Bach Ke" was used in America's Best Dance Crew Season 2 on week 9 of the Around The World challenge as part of the Indian dance section. It also appeared in an episode of the American television show Queer as Folk during a scene at the club Babylon. A version of this song was used as a background music in the Ginebra San Miguel "Bilog Ang Mundo" ad campaigns in 2003. The song was featured in an episode of Entourage. It was used twice in the pilot of the NBC comedy Outsourced.
- "Mundian To Bach Ke" was featured in the 2003 film Bulletproof Monk.
- "Mundian To Bach Ke" was the song used by Derek Hough and Shawn Johnson in their Knight Rider bhangra-themed dance in the semi-finals of Dancing with the Stars (All Stars Season).
- The remix of "Mundian To Bach Ke", which featured American rapper Jay-Z, also on Dharma Records, was featured in the trailer for the 2012 American film The Dictator, as the film's main theme song.
- Sports-comedy Stick It featured the beginning of "Mundian To Bach Ke" in a scene where a group of teens escapes from the arriving police.
- "Mundian To Bach Ke" was used in the dance games Dance Central 3 and Just Dance 4.
- "Mundian To Bach Ke" was used in the Bollywood film Boom (2003).
- In 2009, German singer Peter Fox mashed this song with Seeed's song "Dickes B" during the tour for his solo album Stadtaffe.
- In 2015, it was featured in series 2, episode 2 of the BBC sitcom Scot Squad as two officers did the 'clocking off' dance.
- "Mundian To Bach Ke" was recreated in the Bollywood film Baaghi 2, with lyrics rewritten in Hindi.
- "Mundian To Bach Ke" was featured on Beyoncé and Jay-Z's joint On the Run II Tour, mashed up with Beyoncé's "Baby Boy".
- "Mundian To Bach Ke" was used on the June 2019 Edexcel GCSE Music Paper. It featured on the Section B essay along with the track "Release" by Afro Celt Sound System.
- "Mundian To Bach Ke", featuring Jay-Z, appears on the soundtrack of the 2021 Netflix movie The White Tiger.
- "Mundian To Bach Ke" was used as part of a dance scene within the Closing Ceremony of the 2022 Commonwealth Games in Birmingham.
- ”Mundian To Bach Ke” is commonly used by internet personality Vikkstar123, as it was often played in his and other Sidemen members early vlogs, and has stuck as his “theme song” ever since. He would later use the song as the backing track for his diss track against fellow YouTuber Deji.

=== As stereotype ===
Outside these examples above, its massive popularity lent to frequent stereotypical use in western media as an auditory shorthand for introducing Indian people and/or aspects of their culture on screen. It was for example a part of some internet memes with the audio volume heightened up and titled "loud indian music". The video became popular and featured characters either singing the song or yelling the song. The song was also used in a music video of a cat wearing a keffiyeh, earning 18,000,000 views to date.
