= Snake Charmer (song) =

Single by Panjabi MC

from the album Indian Timing
- Released: 29 May 2009
- Genre: Bhangra
- Length: 3:16 (Radio Edit)
- Label: PMC Records
- Producer(s): Panjabi MC

Panjabi MC singles chronology
"Chaiyya Chaiyya" (2006)	"Snake Charmer" (2009)	"Panjaban" (2009)

"Snake Charmer" is a song by UK bhangra artist Panjabi MC and the first track to be lifted from his 2008 album Indian Timing. It was released as a single in the UK in May 2009.

== Track listing ==
- Digital download
1. "Snake Charmer" (Radio Edit) – 3:16
2. "Snake Charmer" (DS1 Bass Line Mix) – 4:26
3. "Snake Charmer" (Day Dreamers Dance Mix) – 4:02
4. "Snake Charmer" (Instrumental Mix) – 3:15

== Music video ==
The video of the song was released to specialist bhangra and Asian websites and TV stations up to five months before the release of the digital single.

== Chart performance ==
In the UK, the song reached the top 10 of the now defunct Asian Network Chart, as compiled by the BBC Asian Network, and had received heavy airplay rotation as part of the album release and prior to being released as a digital single.

== Release history ==
Region	Date	Format
UK	29 May 2009	Digital download
