= Satinder Satti =

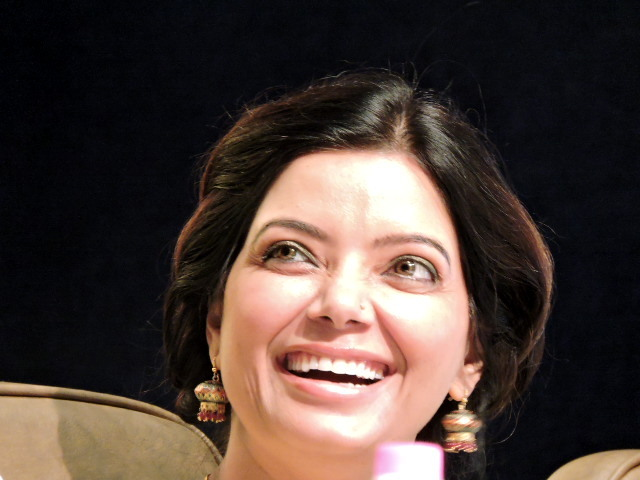

Background information
- Born: 13 December 1979 (age 46); Batala
- Genre: Bhangra
- Occupations: Anchor; poet; actress; singer; lawyer

Satinder Satti is an Indian television anchor, actress, poet, dancer, singer, and former Punjab Arts Council chairperson. She has won accolades for her performances as a popular television host on a non-profit platform launched to spread experiences and ideas among people in Punjab.

== Career ==
Satinder Satti got her bachelor's degree from RR Bawa DAV College, Batala and then her master's degree in law from Guru Nanak Dev University, Amritsar. Starting as an anchor at Guru Nanak Dev University Youth Festivals, Satinder Satti went on to anchor shows on Doordarshan, Alpha Punjabi, E.T.C. and PTC channels. Satinder Satti has also performed many shows and events to raise funds for needy people in Punjab. She has two music albums to her credit Moh and Peeng. Satti released an anthology of poetry Anjammiya Both (unborn child), a collection of poems. Her book was launched by Punjabi poet Surjit Patar.

=== Poems ===
- Kuch khat tere naam

=== Anchor ===
- Kujh Pal Tere Naam
- Excuse Me Please
- Lishkara
- Caught On Camera
- Dil Diyan Gallan
- Chaa Da Cup with Satinder Satti
- The Satinder Satti Show

=== Filmography ===
- Lal Chudiyan
- Saanjh Dilaan Di
- Jee Ayan Nu (2002)
- Myself Pendu (2015)
- Raduaa (2018)

=== Discography ===
Year	Album	Record label	Music director
2007	Peeng (The Swing)	Speed Records/MovieBox/Planet Recordz	Jaidev Kumar & Gaurav Dayal
2009	Moh (My Love...)	Speed Records/Kismet Records/Planet Recordz	Jaidev Kumar
2012	Rubaru (Face-To-Face)	Speed Records	N/A
2018	Dildaar (The Game)	Speed Records/MovieBox	Sukh-E (Muzical Doctorz)
