= Boy soprano =

Singer

A boy soprano (British and especially North American English) or boy treble (only British English) is a young male singer with a voice in the soprano range, a range that is often still called the treble voice range (in North America too) no matter how old.

== Origins ==
In the Anglican and English Catholic liturgical traditions (in which girls and women did not sing in church choirs), young male choristers were normally referred to as "trebles" rather than as boy sopranos, but today the term "boy trebles" is increasingly common (girls with high voices are trebles too). The term "treble" derives from the Latin triplum, used in 13th and 14th century motets to indicate the third and highest range, which was sung above the tenor part (which carried the tune) and the alto part. Another term for that range is superius. The term "treble" itself was first used in the 15th century. Trebles have an average range of A_{3} to F_{5} (220–700 Hz).

The term boy soprano originated with Henry Stephen Cutler (1825–1902), a scholar and choirmaster of the Cecilian Choir, New York, who used the term for both the choir members and soloists, who were church choristers, when giving concerts in public halls. The earliest use found can be traced to a choral festival at Irving Hall, New York, in May 1866.

== Short-lived range ==
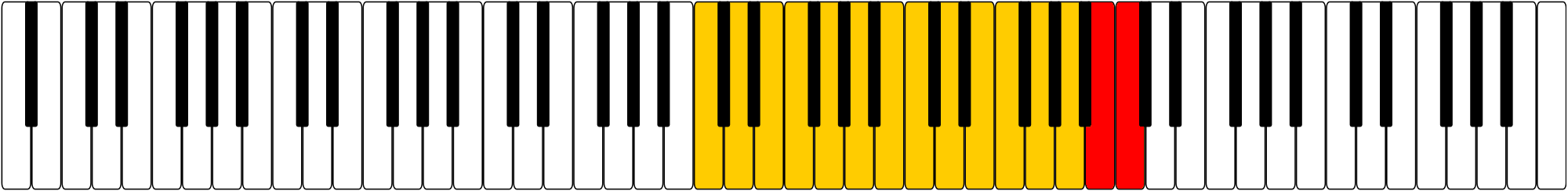
The general vocal range of an adult female soprano is C_{4}–C_{6} (highlighted), with notes unreachable by an average Treble marked in red (B_{5}–C_{6}).

Most trebles have a comfortable range from the A below "middle C" (A_{3}, 220 Hz) to the F one and a half octaves above "middle C" (F_{5}, 698 Hz), roughly corresponding to an adult male baritone range, up one octave. Some writing demands higher notes; the Anglican church repertory, which many trained trebles to sing, frequently demands G_{5} (784 Hz) and A_{5} (880 Hz). Some trebles, however, can extend their voices higher in the modal register to "high C" (C_{6}, 1046 Hz). The high C is considered the defining note of the soprano voice type. For high notes see, for example, the treble solo at the beginning of Stanford's Magnificat in G, David Willcocks' descant to Mendelssohn's tune for the carol Hark, the Herald Angels Sing, the even higher treble solo from Gregorio Allegri's Miserere, and the treble part in the Nunc Dimittis from Tippett's Evening Canticles written for St John's College, Cambridge. Many trebles are also able to reach higher notes by use of the whistle register but this practice is rarely called for and writing above high C is very rare in choral music of any kind.

As a boy approaches and begins to undergo puberty, the quality of his voice increasingly distinguishes itself from that typical of girls. The voice takes on a resonant masculine quality before its pitch drops, resulting in a liminal stage wherein the boy may sing in a high register with a unique timbre. This brief period of high vocal range and unique color forms much of the ground for the use of the boy soprano in both liturgical and secular music in the Western world and elsewhere. Occasionally boys whose voices have changed can continue to sing in the soprano range for a period of time. This stage ends as the boy's larynx continues to grow and, with the breaking of his voice, he becomes unable to sing the highest notes required by the pieces of music involved.

It has been observed that boy sopranos in earlier times were, on average, somewhat older than in modern times. For example, Franz Joseph Haydn was considered to be an excellent boy soprano well into his teens and Ernest Lough was 15 when he first recorded his famous "Hear My Prayer" (on 5 April 1927), with his voice not getting deeper until sometime in 1929, when he was either 17 or 18 years old. However, for a male to sing soprano with an unchanged voice in his mid-to-late teens is currently fairly uncommon. In the developed world, puberty tends to begin at younger ages (most likely due to differences in diet, including greater availability of proteins and vitamins). It is also becoming more widely known that the style of singing and voice training within cathedrals has changed significantly in the past century, making it more difficult for boys to continue singing soprano much beyond the age of 13 or 14, with the raising of concert pitch being one factor.

Early breaking of boys' voices due to puberty becoming earlier in recent times is causing a serious problem for choirmasters.

On the other hand, some musicologists dispute that earlier onset of puberty occurs. They contend that there is no reliable evidence of any significant change in the age of boys' maturity over the past 500 years or even beyond that. A counterargument to this viewpoint is the paucity of bearded fourteen-year-olds from the historical record, the increased incidence of precocious puberty diagnoses, and availability of testosterone replacement therapy that many parents of boys experiencing delayed adolescence or intersex conditions opt to undergo.

== Notable boy sopranos ==
- Billie Joe Armstrong (Green Day frontman) recorded a song titled "Look For Love" at the age of five. He is now a baritone.
- Peter Auty sang the original version of the Howard Blake song "Walking in the Air" for the 1982 animated film The Snowman.
- Justin Bieber first became popular as a boy soprano with a "female" sounding voice. In early 2011, his voice deepened from the high-pitched treble he had as a child to the tenor voice that he currently has as an adult.
- Bobby Breen was a Canadian-American child actor who first became famous for singing around 1935, aged 9. He sang in several Hollywood films, including Let's Sing Again and Rainbow on the River. His voice changed at age 13 in 1940, later resurfacing as a tenor in the 1950s and 60s.
- Tim Curry
- Max Emmanuel Cenčić became famous in his native Croatia at the age of six after singing the Queen of the Night's coloratura aria "Der Hölle Rache" from Mozart's opera The Magic Flute in on Zagreb television in 1982. In 1987, Cenčić sang the notably difficult Frühlingsstimmen in Belgrade at the age of 11. Cenčić worked as a sopranist for a short time even after his voice broke, but he ultimately retrained as a countertenor and found success.
- Daniel Furlong won the third and final season of The All Ireland Talent Show and afterwards released an album called Voice of an Angel.
- Roy Goodman became famous as the 12-year old treble soloist in the March 1963 recording of Allegri's Miserere with the Choir of King's College, Cambridge, under the direction of David Willcocks.
- David Hemmings started his career as a treble for Benjamin Britten and is best known for originating the role of Miles in Britten's Opera The Turn of the Screw.
- Michael Jackson rose to fame as a child alongside his brothers as a member of The Jackson 5. Between 1971 and 1975 his voice descended from boy soprano to lyric tenor.
- Andrew Johnston became famous while singing on season 2 of Britain's Got Talent and afterwards releasing an album called One Voice. He is now a tenor / high baritone opera singer as a result of his voice getting deeper.
- Aled Jones, a world famous Welsh treble, sang a cover version of "Walking in the Air" in 1985 for a Toys "R" Us commercial in spite of being mistaken for the original singer heard on the animated movie The Snowman. He now sings in the baritone vocal range.
- Frankie Lymon became a famous singer when he recorded "Why Do Fools Fall in Love" with 1950s boy band The Teenagers and remained popular after 1957 as a solo artist. As he turned 17-years old in 1959, his voice had changed to a low tenor.
- Bruno Mars performed as an Elvis impersonator as a child. He is now a high tenor.
- Erwin Gutawa starred as Iwan and sang in the 1973 Indonesian film Sebatang Kara. After his voice changed as he grew older, Gutawa became a conductor.
- Jean-Baptiste Maunier starred as Pierre Morhange and sang in the 2004 French film Les Choristes, which is also known as The Chorus.
- Joseph McManners first became known when he played in a local production of the Lionel Bart musical Oliver! as the title character. He then won the BBC competition to portray the title character in Rachel Portman's The Little Prince. He is also known for his renditions of Mike Batt's "Bright Eyes", "Circle of Life" from The Lion King and Howard Shore's "In Dreams".
- Liam McNally became famous when he made it to the Top 10 on season 4 of Britain's Got Talent after he wowed audiences and impressed strict judge Simon Cowell. He is now a baritone singer who, as of 2015, is studying at the Royal Northern College of Music.
- Paul Miles-Kingston's claim to fame was when he sang as one of the soloists in Andrew Lloyd Webber's choral work Requiem with soprano Sarah Brightman and tenor Plácido Domingo. As of 2010, Miles-Kingston worked as a music teacher.
- Paul Phoenix sang the theme song to the BBC Tinker Tailor Soldier Spy as a St. Paul's Cathedral chorister and is now a tenor singer who was in the a cappella group The King's Singers for 17 years.
- Keith Richards (of The Rolling Stones) sang as a choirboy in a trio of trebles for Queen Elizabeth II at Westminster Abbey in the 1950s.
- Aksel Rykkvin was considered by critics to be among the finest boy sopranos, famous for his renditions of baroque arias as well as his chart-topping albums Aksel! (2016) and Light Divine (2018). As of 2018, Rykkvin performs as a baritone.
- Andrew Swait has done touring, live performances and studio recordings both as a chorister for The Choirboys and as a solo artist.
- Anthony Way starred as Henry and sang in the miniseries The Choir, which is based on the novel of the same name by Joanna Trollope.
- James Westman is known as being the first boy to ever perform the song "Child's View of Heaven" from Gustav Mahler's 4th Symphony. He had also toured as a boy soprano with Three Boys Choirs (Paris, American, and Vienna). He is now a successful baritone opera singer.
- Zhou Shen, a popular Chinese singer most known for his song Big Fish, despite passing puberty, continues to sing at or near the soprano range.
- Nick Jonas (of the Jonas Brothers) started performing on Broadway at the age of 7 and at the age of 12 released an solo album entitled "Nicholas Jonas" prior to forming a band with his brothers. His early vocals were compared to that of young Stevie Wonder and Michael Jackson.
- Jacob Collier, now a prominent musician, songwriter, composer and arranger, performed the role of Miles in Benjamin Britten's The Turn of the Screw in three separate productions at a young age. He has since cited Britten as a major influence on his own approach to harmony.
