= Kaka Bhaniawala =

Punjabi singer

Background information
- Born: Santokh Singh Rataurh; 5 April 1974; Bhani, Punjab, India
- Origin: India
- Died: 12 April 2009 Ludhiana, Punjab, India
- Genres: Punjabi Folk & Bhangra
- Occupation: Singer
- Instrument: Vocals
- Years active: 1995 –2009

Kaka Bhaniawala (born Santokh Singh Rataurh; 5 April 1970 – 12 April 2009) was an Indian singer from Punjab, India. His debut album with Music Pearls Recording Company Ludhiana was Mashooq Teri Challi.

== Musical career ==
Kaka started out singing in India with released his debut music album with "Music Pearls Company", Ludhiana which brought him local recognition. He later started singing for UK-based producers, such Bally Rai. His major breakthrough in the UK Bhangra music came through the release of "Sahnevaal Chowk" Remix, the title track of the debut album of The Specialist and Tru-Skool, Word Is Born (2004).

He has had many chart hits with many famous artists including, DJ H & DJ Rags, with his sole UK Singles Chart dent providing lead vocals for Nachna Onda Nei, which peaked on 62.

== Death ==
On 12 April 2009, it was announced that Bhaniawala had died of jaundice from liver failure in Ludhiana after going through a routine blood treatment. This was due to excessive drinking.

== Posthumous albums ==
Year	Album	Record label	Info	Music
2014	Desi Quiz	UK Speed Records	Tracks 9	Music: DJ Dips
2017	Naina Di Lishkari	VIP Records	Tracks 10	Music: Various

== Singles ==
Year	Album	Record label	Info	Music
2016	Mehndi	VIP Records	Taken From The Forthcoming Album "Naina Di Lishkari"	Music: Notorious Jatt
2017	Angreji Wala Sher	VIP Records	Taken From The Forthcoming Album "Naina Di Lishkari"	Music: V Grooves
2017	Gidhe Vich Nachdi Phire	VIP Records	Taken From The Forthcoming Album "Naina Di Lishkari"	Music: Tru-Skool
2017	Chota Putt	VIP Records	Taken From The Forthcoming Album "Naina Di Lishkari"	Music: DJ Gurps
