= Panjabi MC =

British-Indian rapper and producer (born 1973)

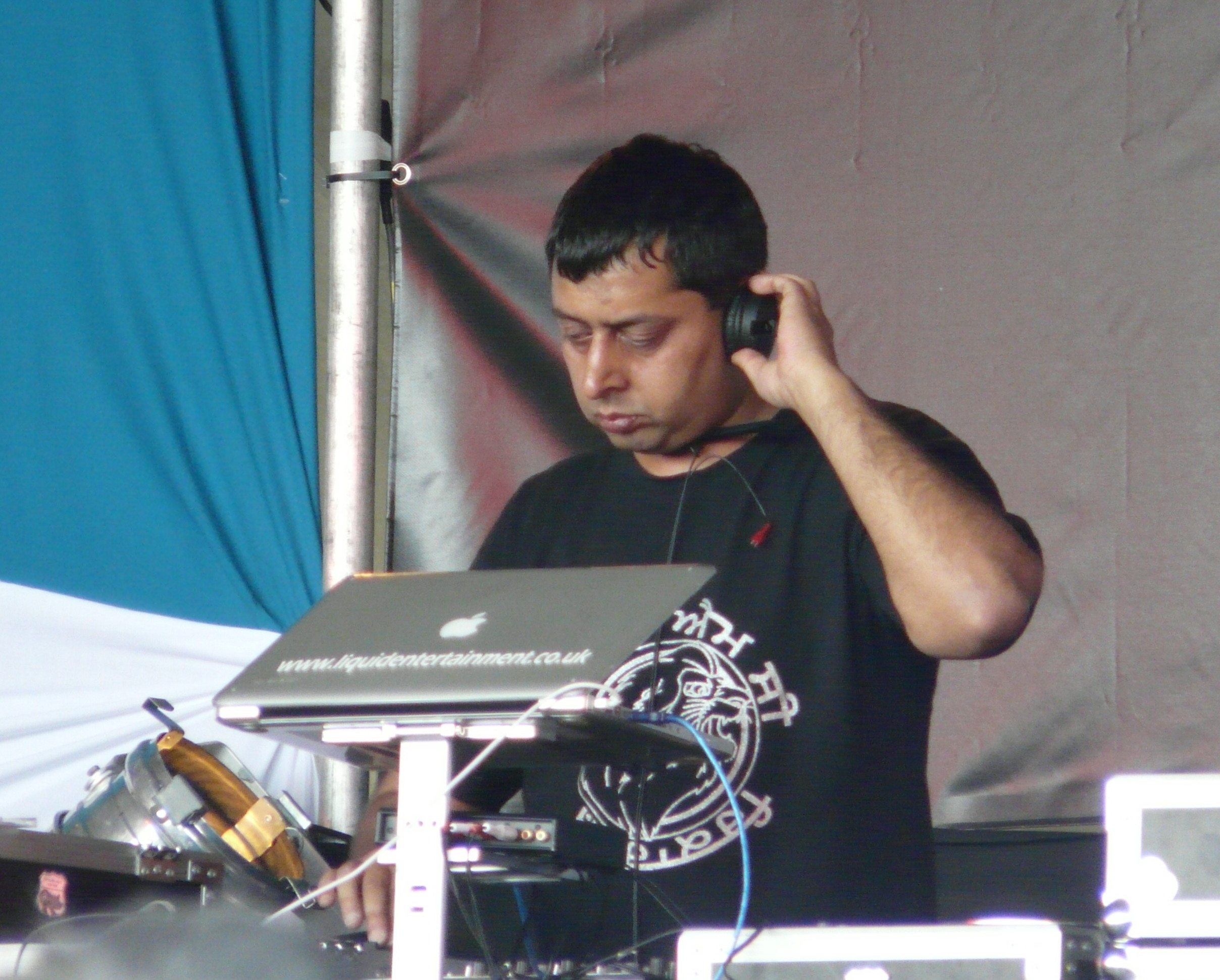
- Panjabi MC performing at London Mela in August 2010

Background information
- Born: Rajinder Singh Rai; 14 February 1973 (age 53); Coventry, Warwickshire, England
- Genres: Bhangra; Asian Underground; electronic; alternative hip-hop; trip hop
- Occupation: Musician
- Years active: 1993–present
- Labels: Nachural Records; Superstar Recordings (Germany); Urban Records; PMC Records (UK); Universal (India); Ultra Records
- Website: panjabi-mc.com

Rajinder Singh Rai (born 14 February 1973), known professionally as Panjabi MC, is a British recording artist, rapper, record producer and DJ. He is best known for the worldwide bhangra 2002 hit "Mundian To Bach Ke", which sold 10 million copies worldwide, making it one of the best-selling singles of all time. Among other songs, he also gained acclaim with the 2003 release "Jogi". AllMusic has called him "one of the most prominent names in bhangra".

== Biography ==
=== Career ===
Rajinder Singh Rai was born in Coventry to parents from Punjab, India. He adopted his stage name from the Punjabi language he uses in the music he plays and raps. "One of [his] main goals is to fuse the two worlds [of bhangra and hip-hop music genres]".

Nachural Records signed Panjabi MC following a remix he made of "Ghariah Milan De", a song by Indian Punjabi singer Kuldeep Manak; although the single was taken off the market, Panjabi MC continued making records. The first successful release, however, was "Mundian To Bach Ke" ("Beware of the Boys" in Punjabi): it first appeared on the 1998 album Legalised, and samples the theme music of the television series Knight Rider with Bhangra music. Originally, an underground hit on the internet, it was picked up by the German record label Superstar Recordings, and became a mainstream hit song across Europe, including Germany and UK.

In 2003 a version of this single was released featuring American rapper Jay-Z, whose title was "Beware of the Boys"; in the same year he released Yogi, a song which had not the success of the previous single but also topped the charts. His work, particularly the early singles and the "Mundian To Bach Ke" version with Jay-Z, brought Bhangra to a global audience via the BBC; he later continued to produce and remix music.

In 2004, he recorded a song called "Mirza" and mixed it with "Isyankar", a song by Turkish singer Mustafa Sandal, but they did not release the remixed version. In 2008 was released Panjabi MC's album Indian Timing; the "Snake Charmer" music video was screened at Deejay Ra's music video night in Toronto at the FILMI festival, North America's longest running South Asian film festival.

=== Remixes and samples made by Panjabi MC in his songs ===
Panjabi MC used "Planet Rock", a 1982 song by Afrika Bambaataa, for his release "Pyar Wich (Planet Rock Remix)", before the latter could record "Indian Planet Rock"; this version by British-born Indian DJs was included on the 1998 album Legalised. On Indian Timing, Panjabi MC used vocal samples from "Im Nin'alu", a 1984 song by Israeli singer Ofra Haza. On "Jatt Ho Giya Sharabee", a song released in 1998, Panjabi MC used the theme music from the television series Magnum, P.I.. In "Mundian To Bach Ke", along with the subsequent remix version featuring Jay-Z "Beware of the Boys", the Dj used the bassline from the television series Knight Rider. Both the last two songs were on the album Legalised, released in 1998.

=== Media use of Panjabi MC's songs ===
The 1998 single "Jatt Ho Giya Sharabee", included later on the 2003 album Beware, was featured on the television show Heroes (episode 2, Don't Look Back, aired on October 2, 2006). The 2001 song "Yaaran Kollon Sikh Kuriye" was featured in the television show Wildboyz as a music video. In the same year, Panjabi MC made his Canadian premiere at the Payal Banquet Hall in Mississauga, Ontario. Deejay Ra hosted a TV special covering the event entitled "The Bhangramentary", which aired on the Asian Television Network (ATN). The 1998/2002 single "Mundian To Bach Ke" was featured in an episode of Queer as Folk television series and in the 2002 movie Bend It Like Beckham; it also was featured, in the remix version of "Mundian To Bach Ke" with Jay-Z, on the soundtrack of the 2021 BAFTA-nominated Netflix film The White Tiger. Panjabi MC has also appeared on Top of the Pops, from which the "Mundian To Bach Ke" videoclip began to appear on music channels around the world in heavy rotation.

Together with Sukhwinder Singh and Sapna Awasthi, Panjabi MC remixed the popular song "Chaiyya Chaiyya" from the 1998 Bollywood film, Dil Se... This version played during opening and final credits for the 2006 Hollywood movie Inside Man. Their song "Land of Five Rivers" (the exact translation of Punjab) was used as a theme song for the WWE wrestler The Great Khali, and featured on Voices: WWE The Music, Vol. 9.

== Discography ==
=== Studio albums ===
- Souled Out (1993, Nachural Records)
- Another Sell Out (1994, Nachural Records)
- 100% Proof (1995, Nachural Records)
- Grass Roots (1996, Nachural Records)
- Magic Desi (1996)
- Legalised (1998, Nachural Records)
- Dhol Jageero Da (2001, Moviebox)
- Desi (2002, Moviebox)
- Indian Breaks (2003, Compagnia Nuove Indye)
- Mundian To Bach Ke (2003, Compagnia Nuove Indye)
- The Album (German version: Superstar/Warner; Germany) (French version: Scorpio; France) (UK Version: Instant Karma) (2003)
- Beware (American version of "The Album"; 2003, Sequence)
- Steel Bangle (2005, Moviebox)
- Indian Timing (2008, PMC Records)
- The Raj (2010, PMC Records)
- 56 Districts (2019, PMC Records)

=== Compilation albums ===
- Sentello II (2004, Korsan Cd)
- Illegal (2006, Nupur Audio)

=== EPs ===
- Jatt Ho Gya Sharabi (1996, Nachural Records)
- Mirza Part Two (1997, Nachural Records)
- Switchin' (2000, Moviebox)

=== Singles ===
List of singles as lead artist, with selected chart positions and certifications, showing year released and album name
Title	Year	Peak chart positions													Certifications	Album
Title	Year	US	US R&B	US Dance	AUS	BEL	CAN	DEN	GER	IRL	FRA	ITA	SWI	UK	Certifications	Album
"Ghariah Milan De"	1995	—	—	—	—	—	—	—	—	—	—	—	—	—		Non-album single
"Mundian To Bach Ke"	1998	—	—	—	—	—	—	—	—	—	—	—	—	—		Legalised
"Jatt Ho Giya Sharabee"	1998	—	—	—	—	—	—	—	—	—	—	—	—	—		Jatt Ho Gya Sharabi
"Yaaran Kollon Sikh Kuriye"	2001	—	—	—	—	—	—	—	—	—	—	—	—	—		The Album
"Mundian To Bach Ke" (featuring Jay-Z)	2003	33	21	3	12	3	10	5	2	14	15	1	4	5	BEA: Gold; BVMI: Gold; IFPI Greece: Gold; IFPI SWI: Gold	Legalised
"Jogi"	2003	—	—	—	92	55	—	—	12	47	75	30	8	25		Jogi EP
"Chaiyya Chaiyya (Bollywood Joint)"	2006	—	—	—	—	—	—	—	—	—	—	—	—	—		Non-album singles
"Snake Charmer"	2007	—	—	—	—	—	—	—	—	—	—	—	—	—		Non-album singles
"Land of Five Rivers"	2009	—	—	—	—	—	—	—	—	—	—	—	—	—		Non-album singles
"Moorni (Balle Balle)"	2010	—	—	—	—	—	—	—	—	—	—	—	—	—		Non-album singles
"—" denotes a recording that did not chart or was not released in that territory.

== Awards ==
- 2003: MTV Europe Music Awards – Best Dance Act – "Panjabi MC"
- 2003: MOBO Awards – Best UK Act
- 2003: UK Asian Music Awards – Best Single Bhangra – "Mundian To Bach Ke"
- 2003: World Music Awards – World's Best Indian Artist
- 2011: Punjabi Music Awards – Best Sound Recording – "Moorni"
- 2011: Brit Asia TV Music Awards – Best Single – "Moorni" and Best Asian Music Producer
- 2018: Brit Asia TV Music Awards – Outstanding Achievement
